= Marquand Collection =

Art collection owned by Henry Gurdon Marquand

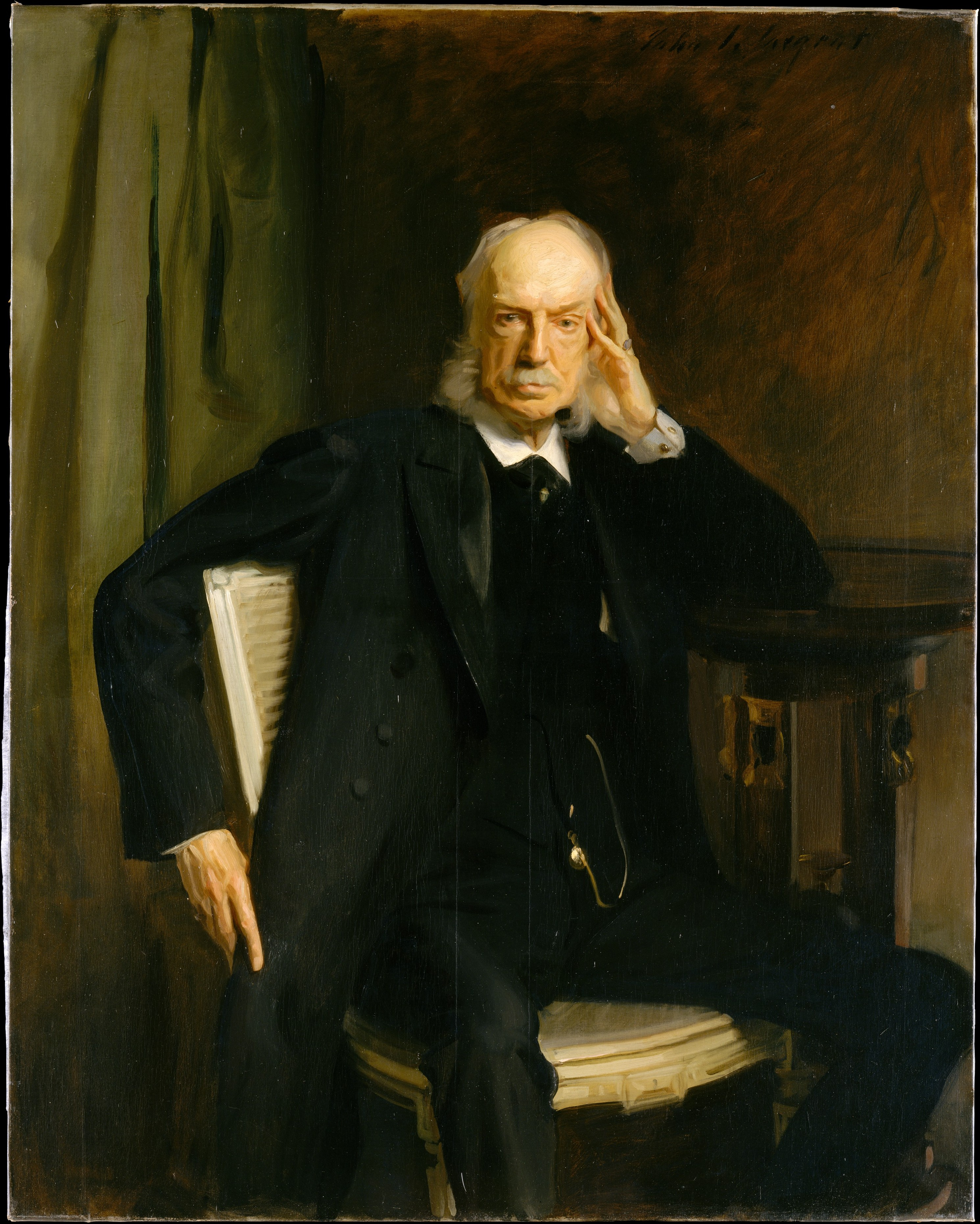
Portrait of Marquand, by John Singer Sargent, 1897.

The Art Collection of Henry Gurdon Marquand was a collection of antiques and paintings owned by Henry Gurdon Marquand, the second president of the Metropolitan Museum of Art, until his death in 1902.

== History ==
In the late 1840s, after the sale of his family's jewelry business and store (which was renamed to Ball, Tompkins & Black), Marquand traveled to Europe where he met Henry Kirke Brown and other expatriate American sculptors in Rome. While there, he "began to 'frequent studios' and "to understand the artists' 'hopes, aims, and aspirations.' There Marquand fell under the spell of what Henry James called 'the old and complex civilization.'" He returned in 1852 with his new wife and spent a year in Rome, where the first of their six children was born. In 1889, he became the second president of the Metropolitan Museum of Art, and made many significant gifts to the Metropolitan Museum, including works by Filippo Lippi, Lucas van Leyden, Frans Hals, Anthony van Dyck, Rembrandt, Diego Velázquez, Thomas Gainsborough, John Trumbull and John Singer Sargent.

Following his 1902 death, his collection exhibited at the American Art Galleries in New York before it was put up for auction. In conjunction with the January and February 1903 auction, The American Art Association put out the Illustrated Catalogue of the Art and Literary Property Collected by the late Henry G. Marquand, edited by Thomas E. Kirby. In the foreword by art critic Russell Sturgis, he wrote:

"He bought like an Italian price of the Renaissance. He collected for his own delight and for the enjoyment and instruction of his many friends. A noble Van Dyck portrait appealed to him, and so did a Persian vase. He was the most eager purchaser of a single newly found gem of antique art; he would chase the elusive thing with more energy than another, and therefore he secured the price. He felt also the impossibility of understanding a branch of art, or a special manufacture, or mode of design, without having many pieces to represent and explain it, and so he bought largely along some chosen lines."

The sale of his collection brought $197,070 for 93 paintings (including A Reading from Homer by Sir Lawrence Alma-Tadema which sold for $30,300 (Note: The painting was commissioned by Marquand in 1882 after he had acquired a small Alma-Tadema painting, Amo Te, Ama Me (1881). The commission was for a larger work which was originally intended to depict Plato teaching philosophy to a small group of followers arranged around the marble courtyard of a temple precinct overlooking the sea, with Plato seated on a marble chair between the columns of the temple. After working on the painting of Plato for a considerable time, Alma-Tadema was still dissatisfied with the result and he repainted the work afresh in early 1885, ultimately producing a similar painting which became A Reading from Homer. Pentimenti show that the composition continued to evolve: for example, Alma-Tadema changed the speaker's arm, which had been thrown out in a dramatic declamatory gesture.)), $22,637 for "255 vases, jars, dishes, bowls, beakers, incense burners, water-vases, wine cups, and writer's water jars", and $234,564 for rugs and tapestries, including a 15th or early 16th-century Persian rug that brought $38,000. Another $117,000 was received for enamels, pottery, bronzes, tiles and intaglios. A single retable (altar piece) brought $26,000. (Note: The painted enamel plaques in gilt screen by Léonard Limosin were purchased by Marquand in April 1883 during the Beurdeley sale. During the 1903 Marquand sale, it was purchased by Henry Walters for $26,000. Upon Walters' death, he bequeathed the piece to the Walters Art Museum in 1931.)

== Collection ==
=== Paintings ===
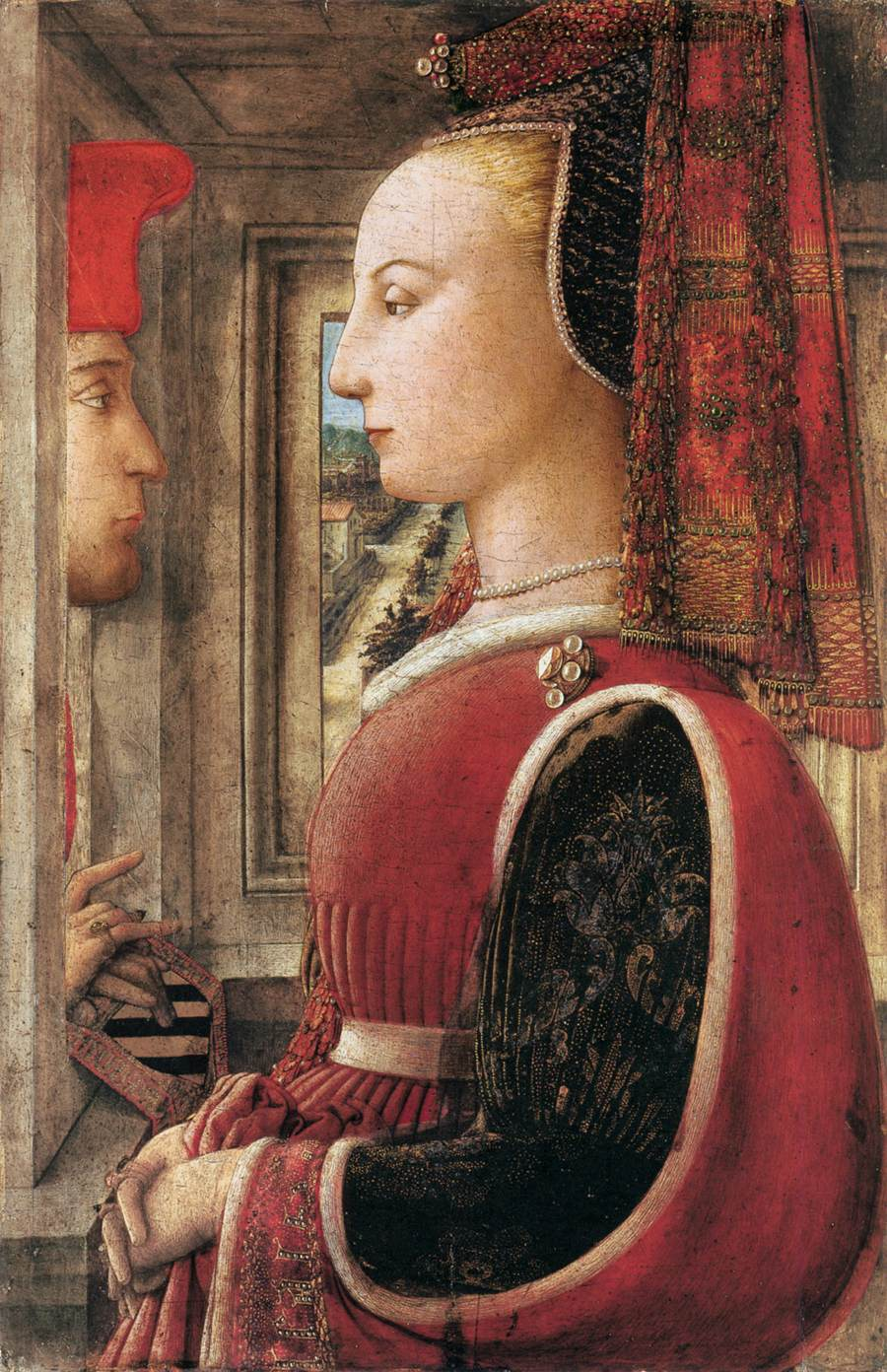
Portrait of a Man and a Woman by Filippo Lippi (c. 1440)

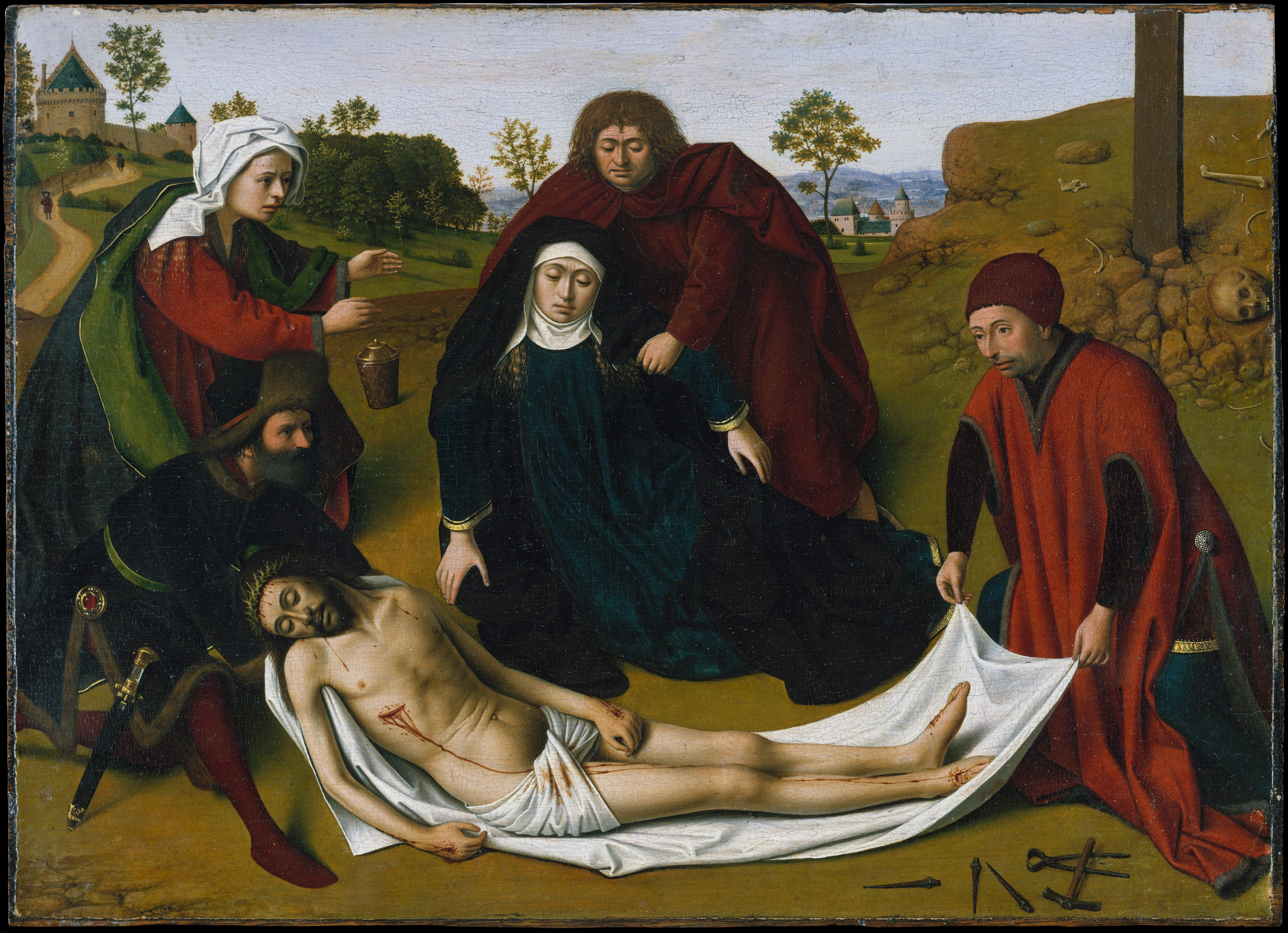
The Lamentation by Petrus Christus (c. 1450)

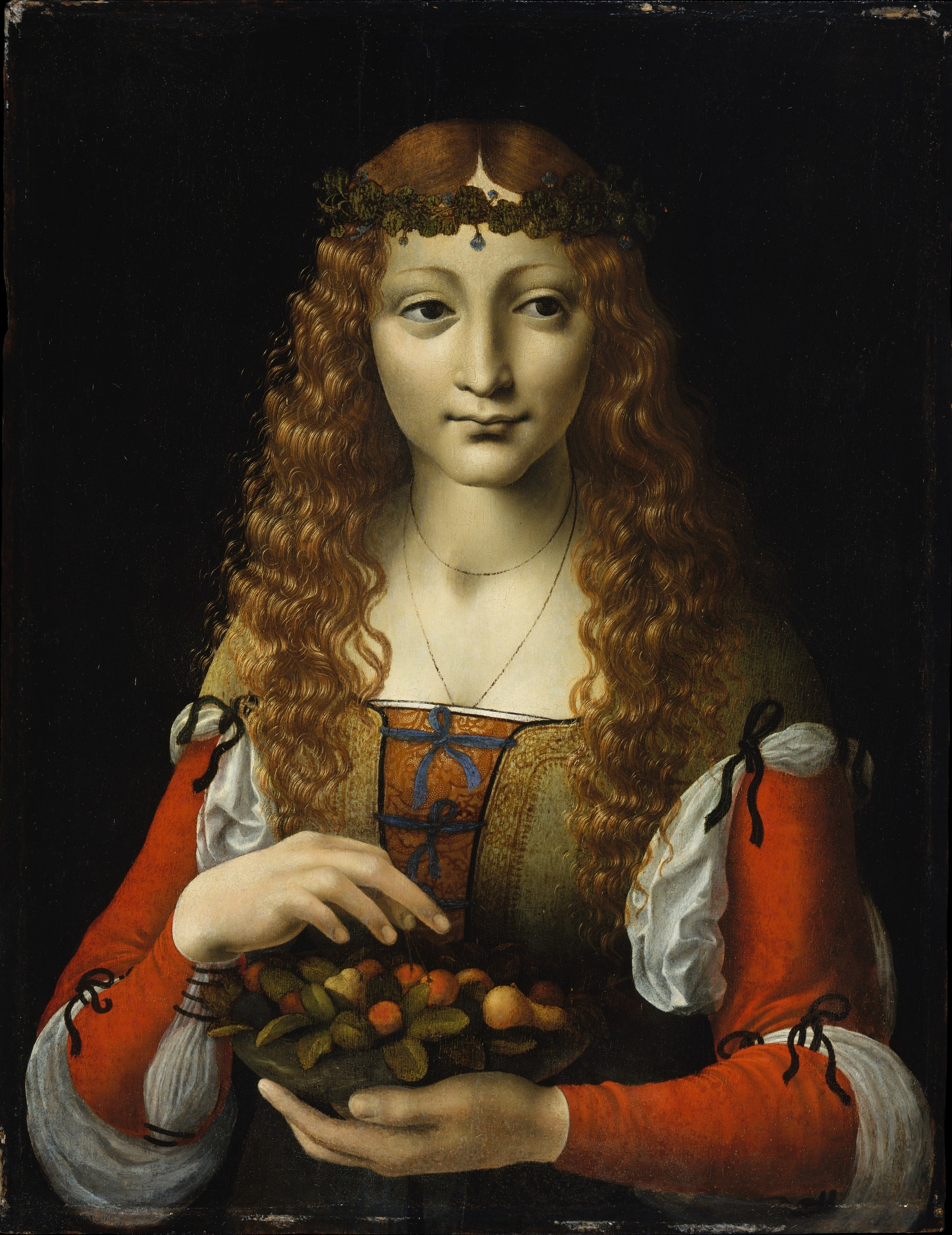
Girl with Cherries, attributed to Marco da Oggiono (c. 1491–95)

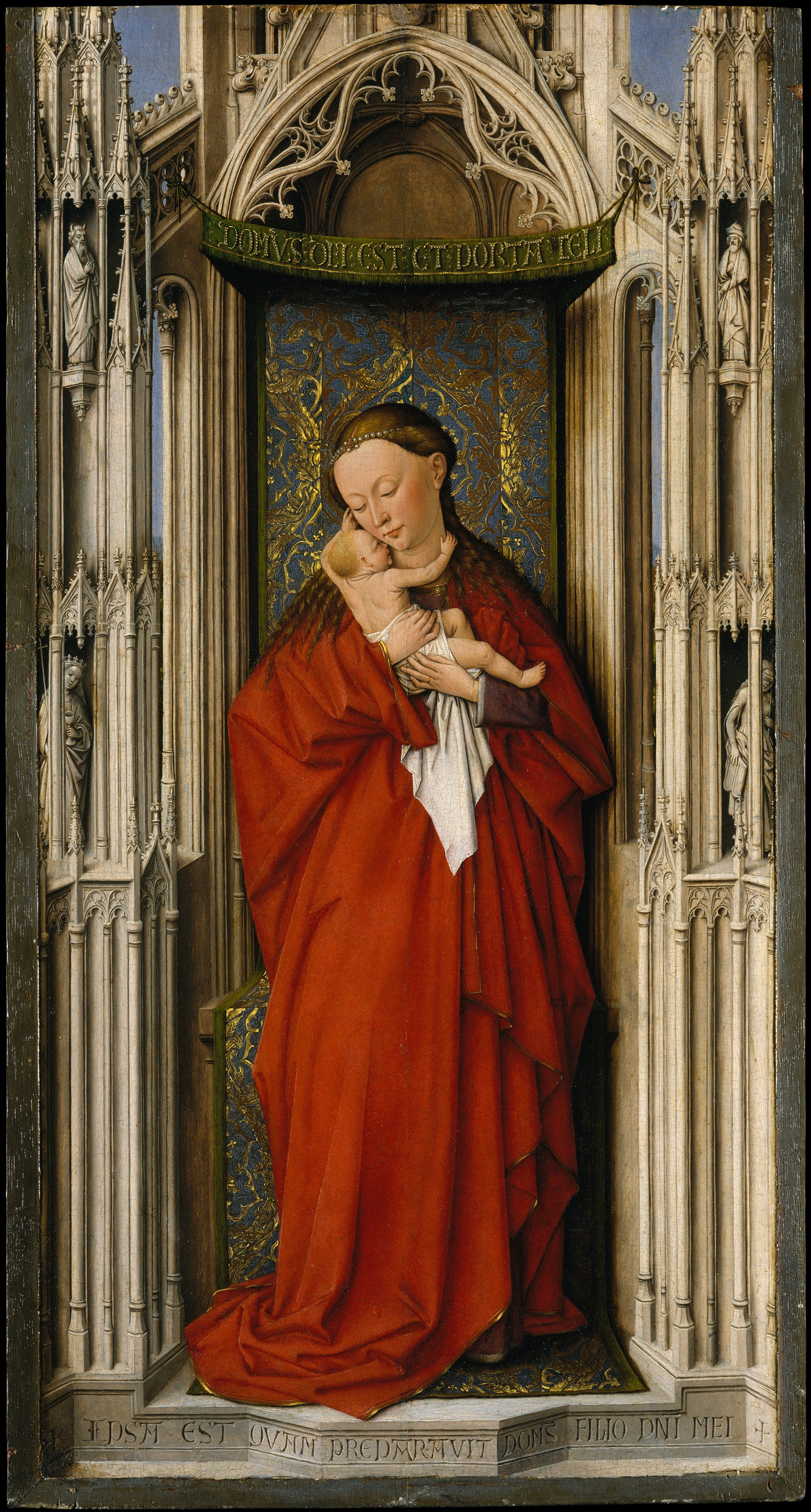
Virgin and Child in a Niche (c. 1500)

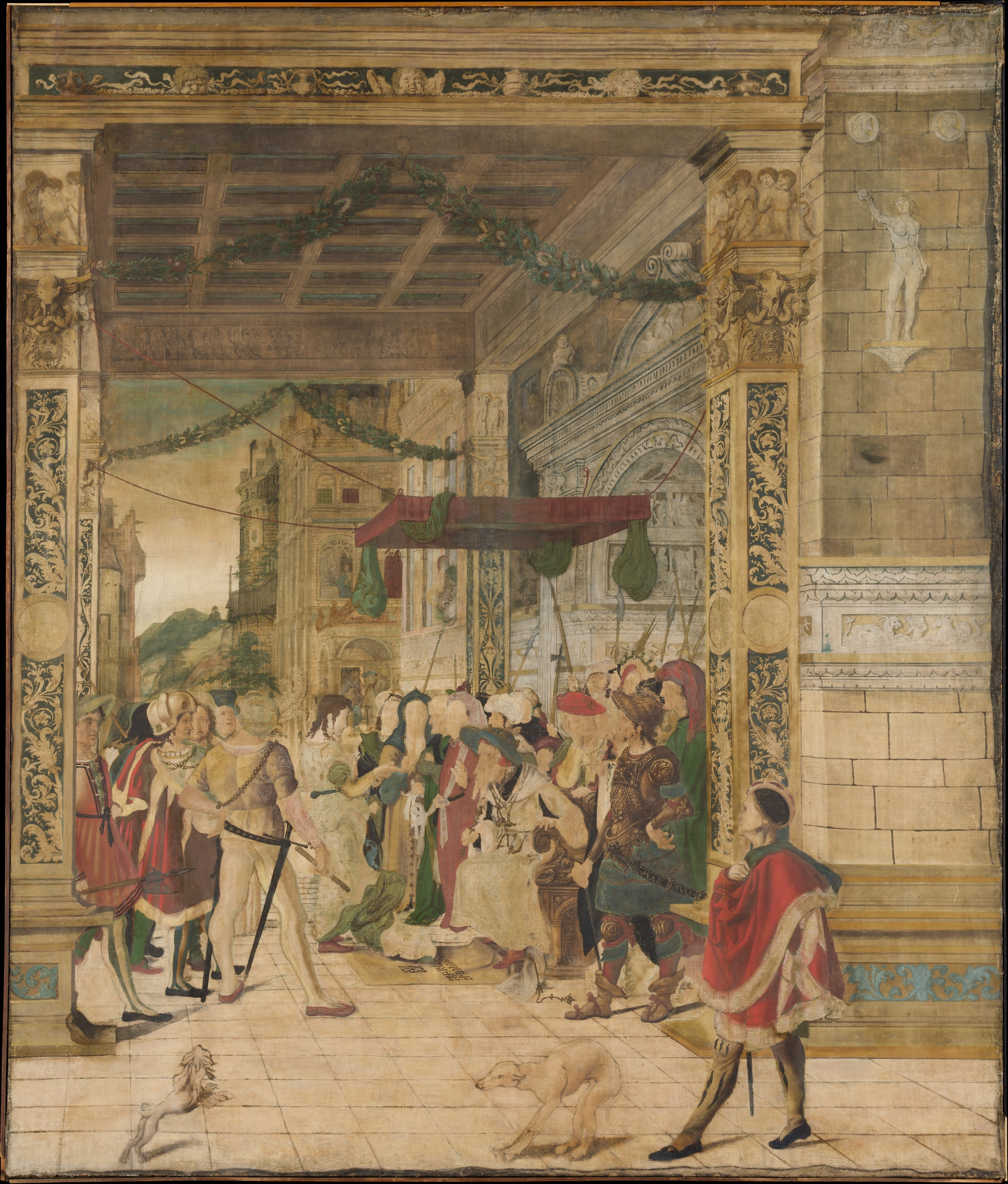
Joseph Interpreting the Dreams of Pharaoh (c. 1534–47)

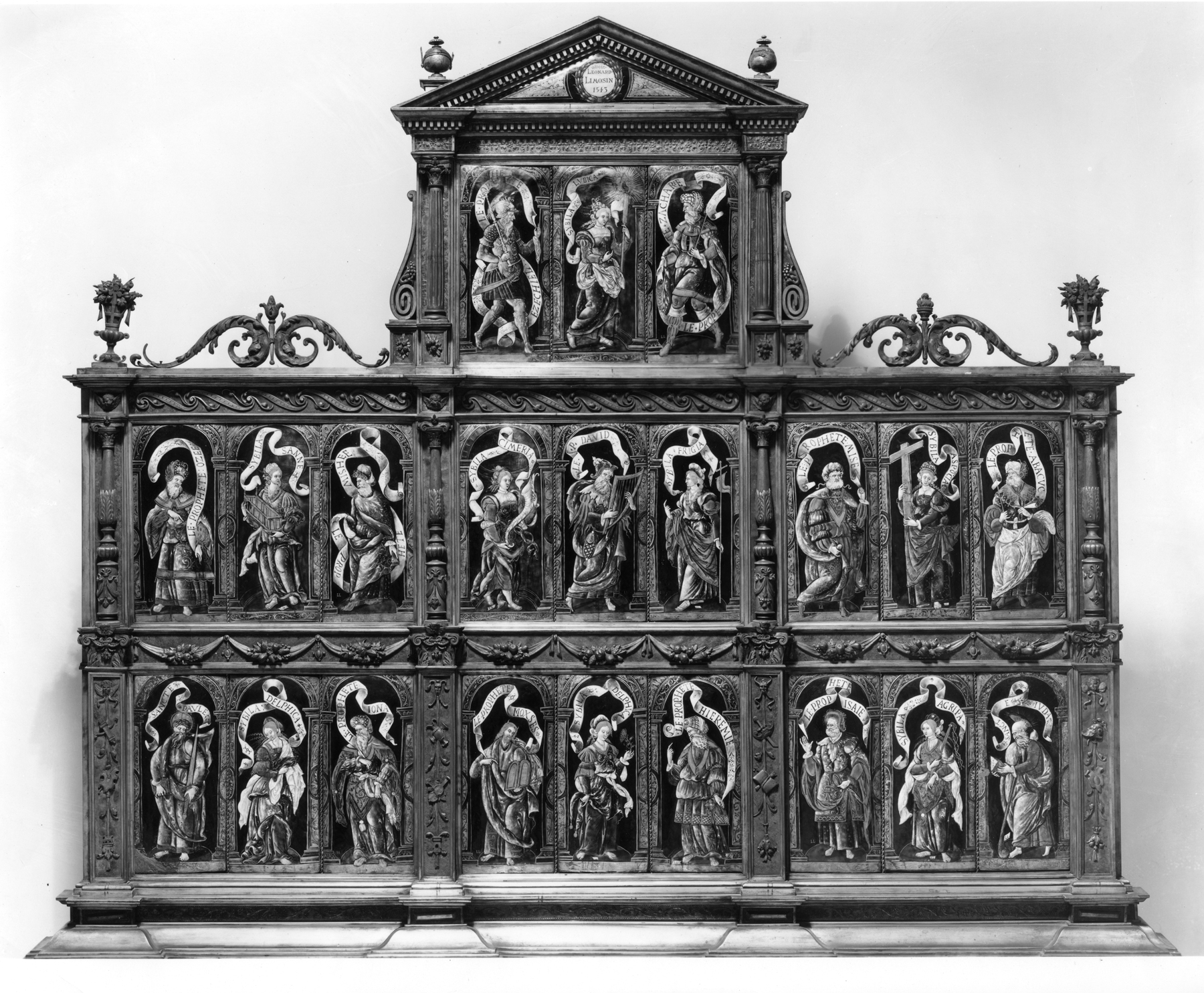
Twenty-one Plaques Depicting Prophets, Apostles and Sibyls by Léonard Limousin (between c. 1535 and c. 1540)

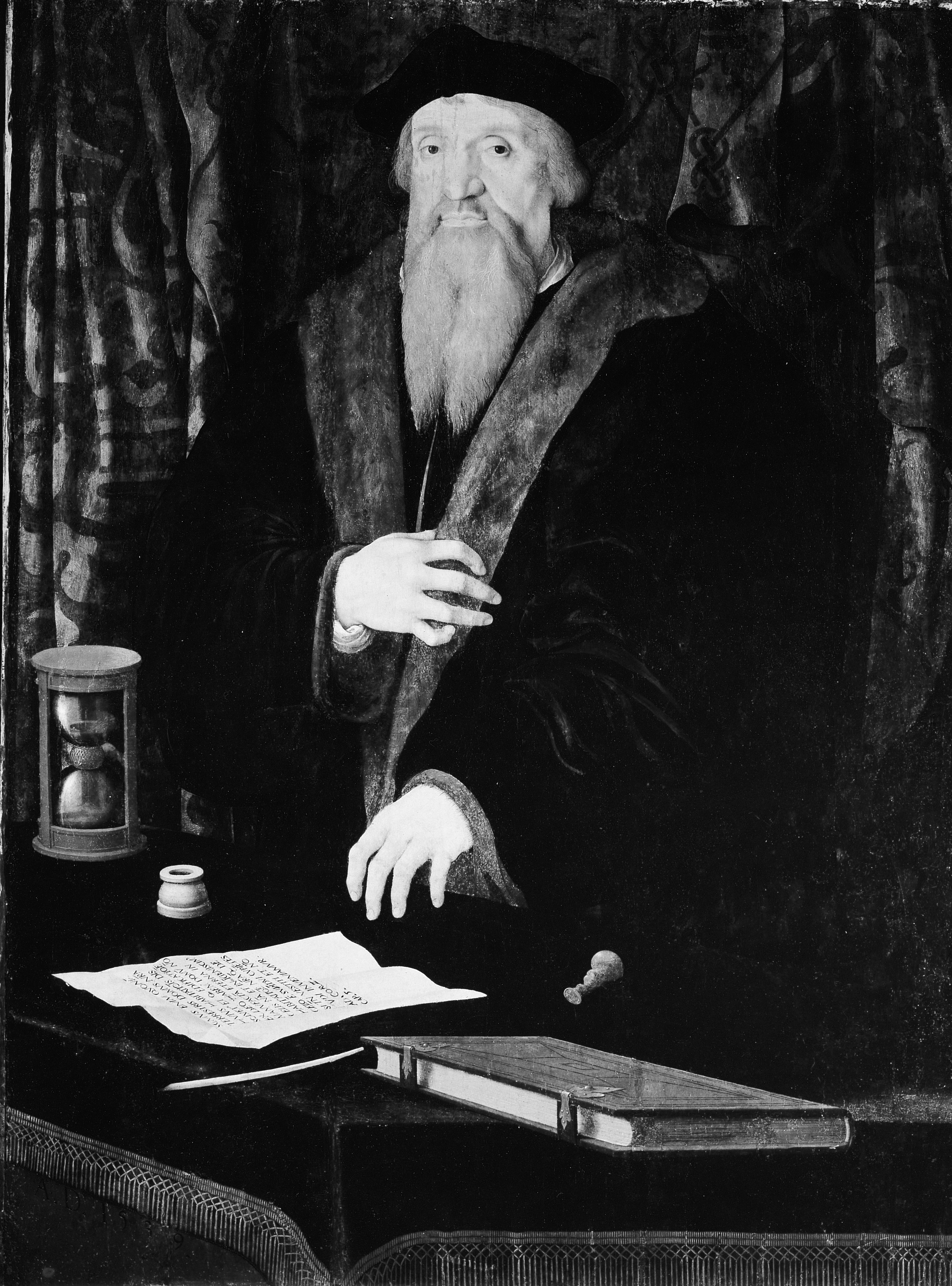
Portrait of a Man, Possibly Jean de Langeac, Bishop of Limoges (1539)

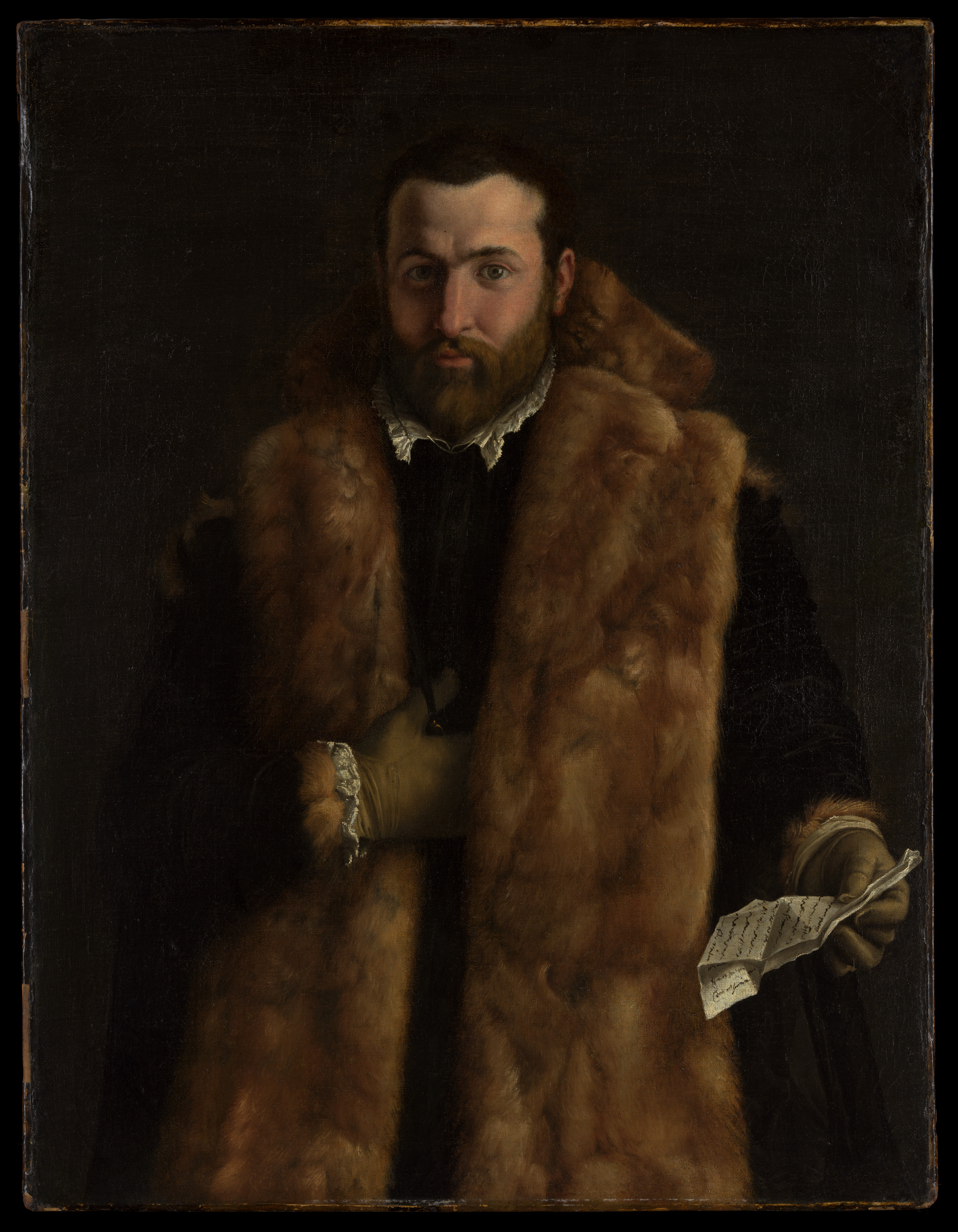
Portrait of a Man in a Fur-Trimmed Coat (c. 1540)

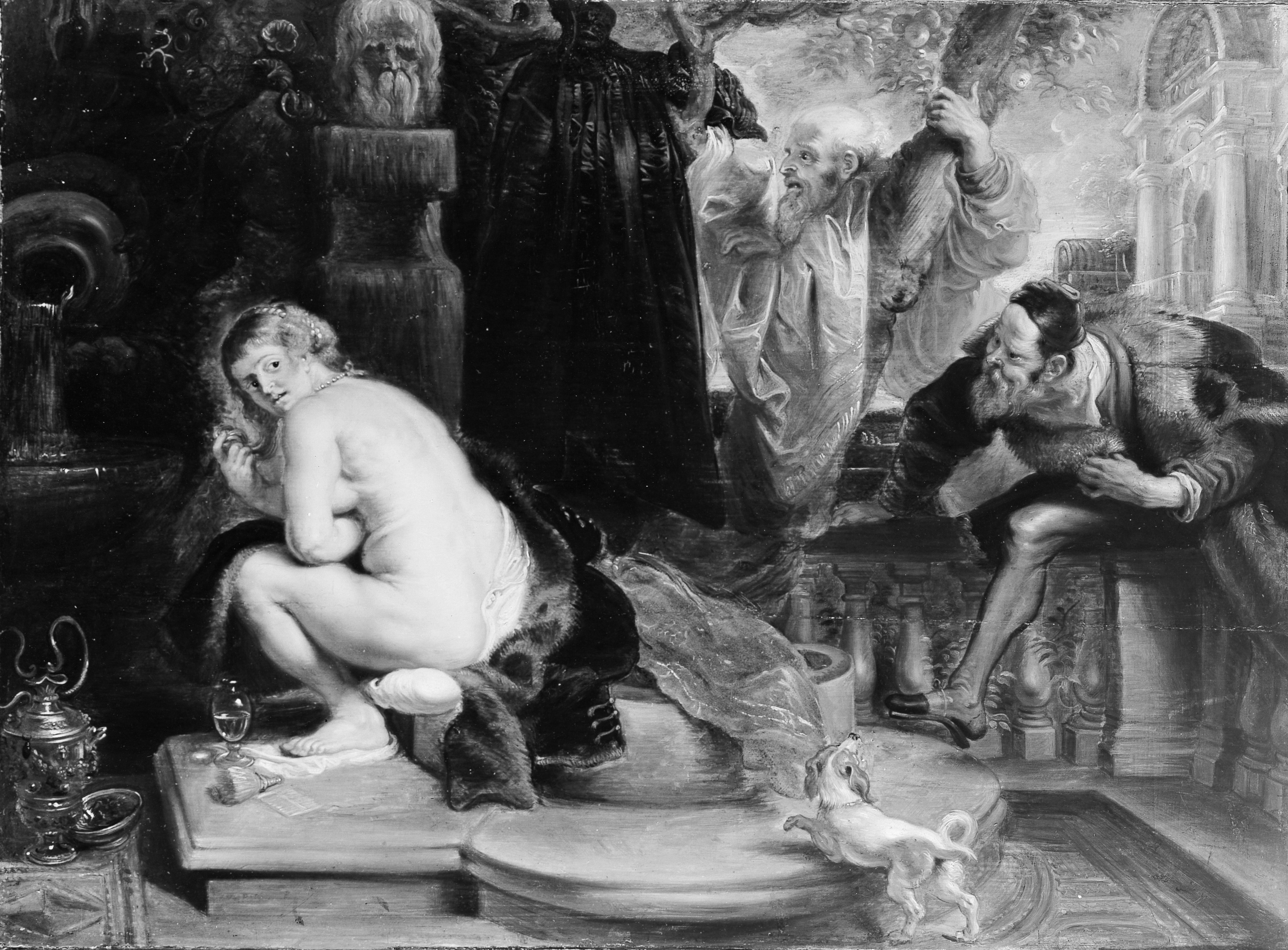
Susanna and the Elders by Peter Paul Rubens (between 1597 and 1640)

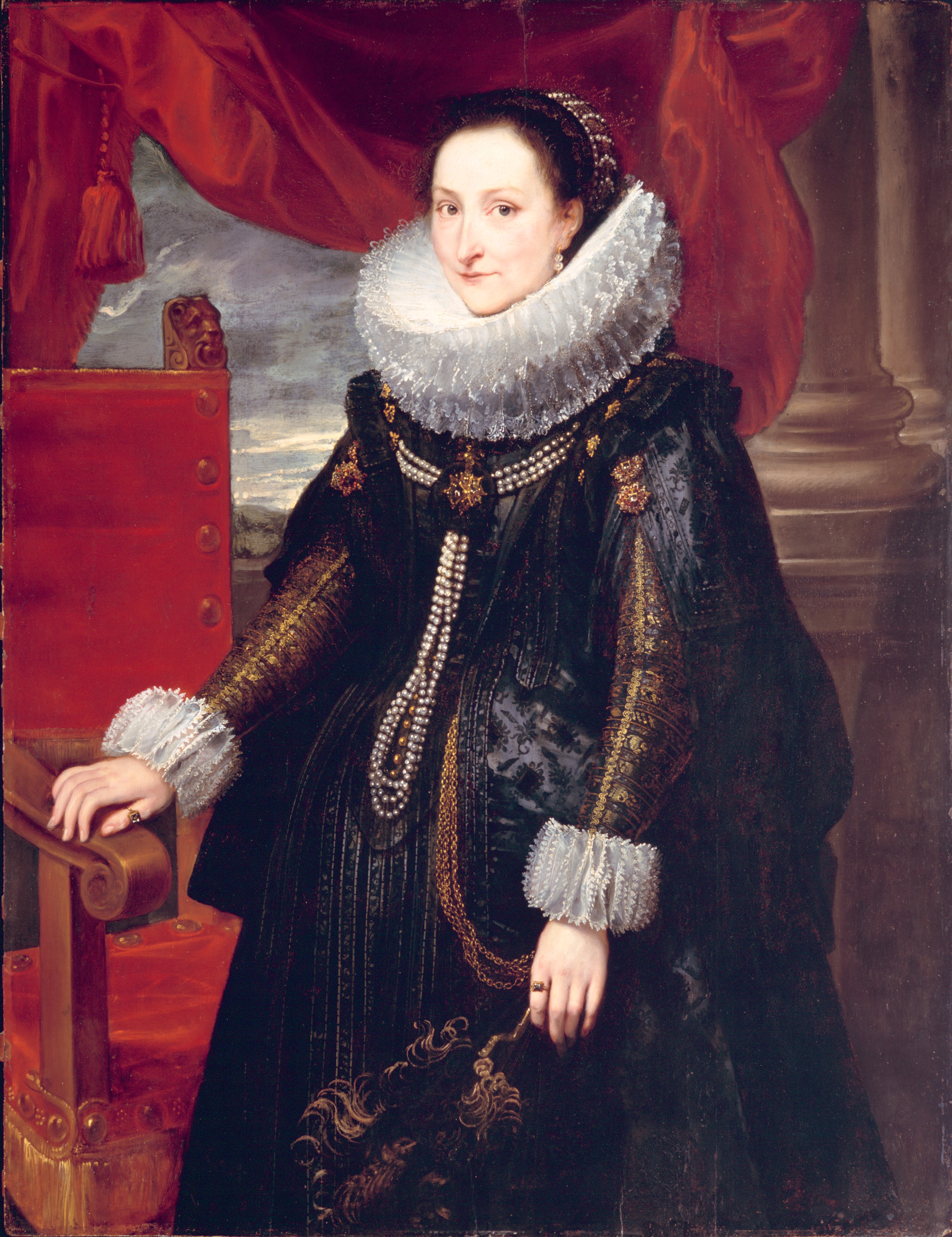
Portrait of a Woman by Cornelis de Vos (between 1599 and 1651)

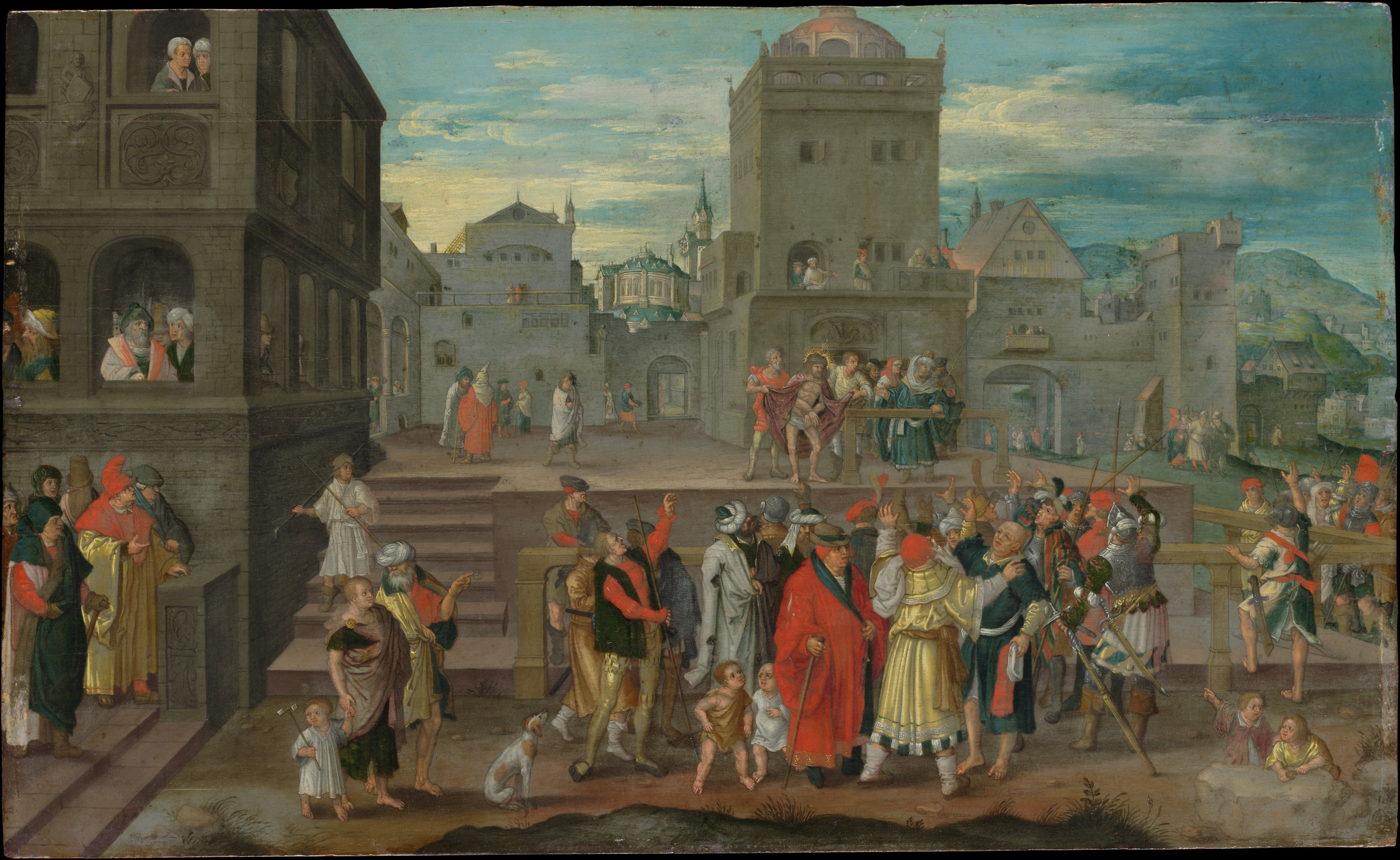
Christ Presented to the People by Lucas van Leyden (16th century)

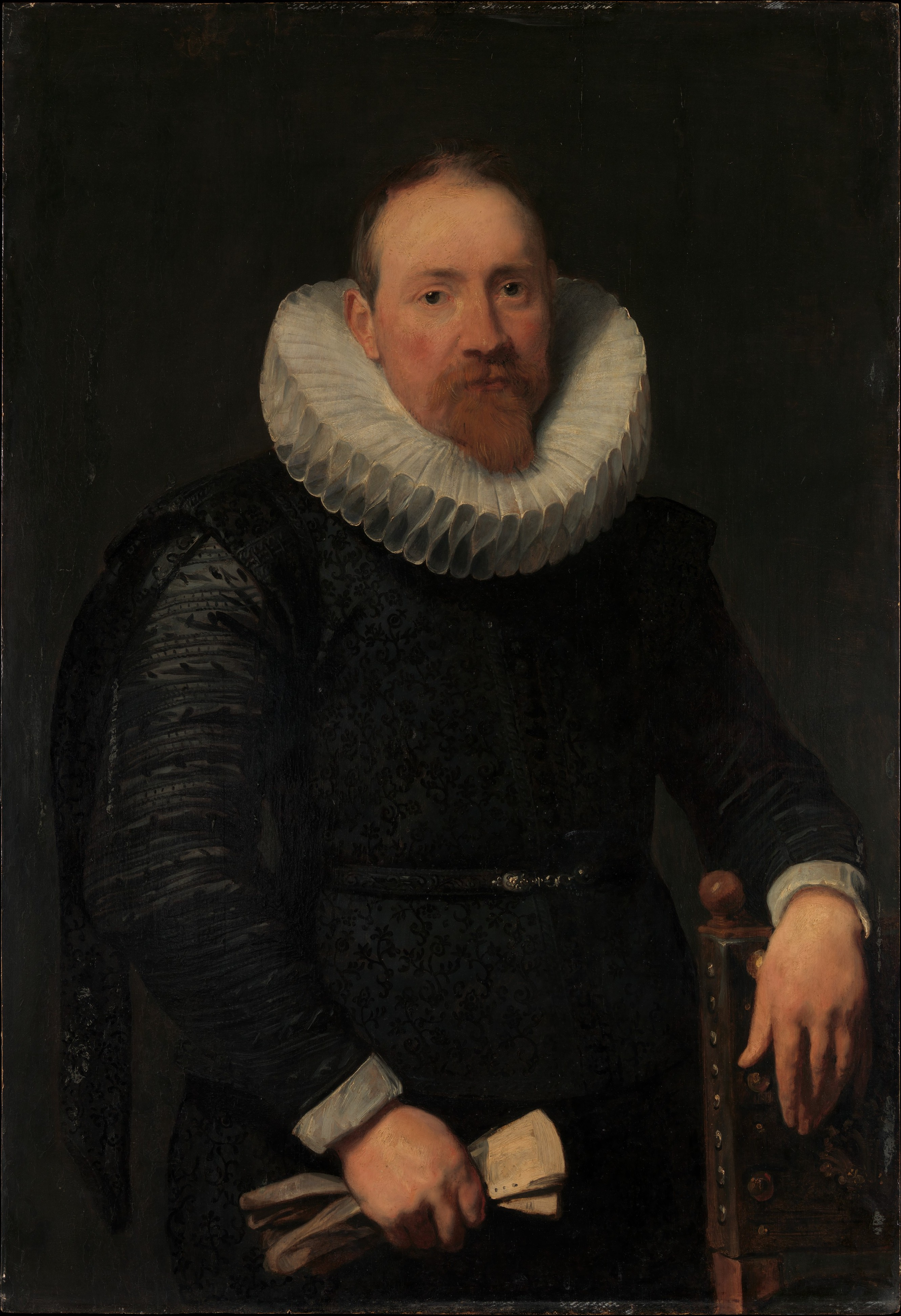
Portrait of a Man by Anthony van Dyck (c. 1618)

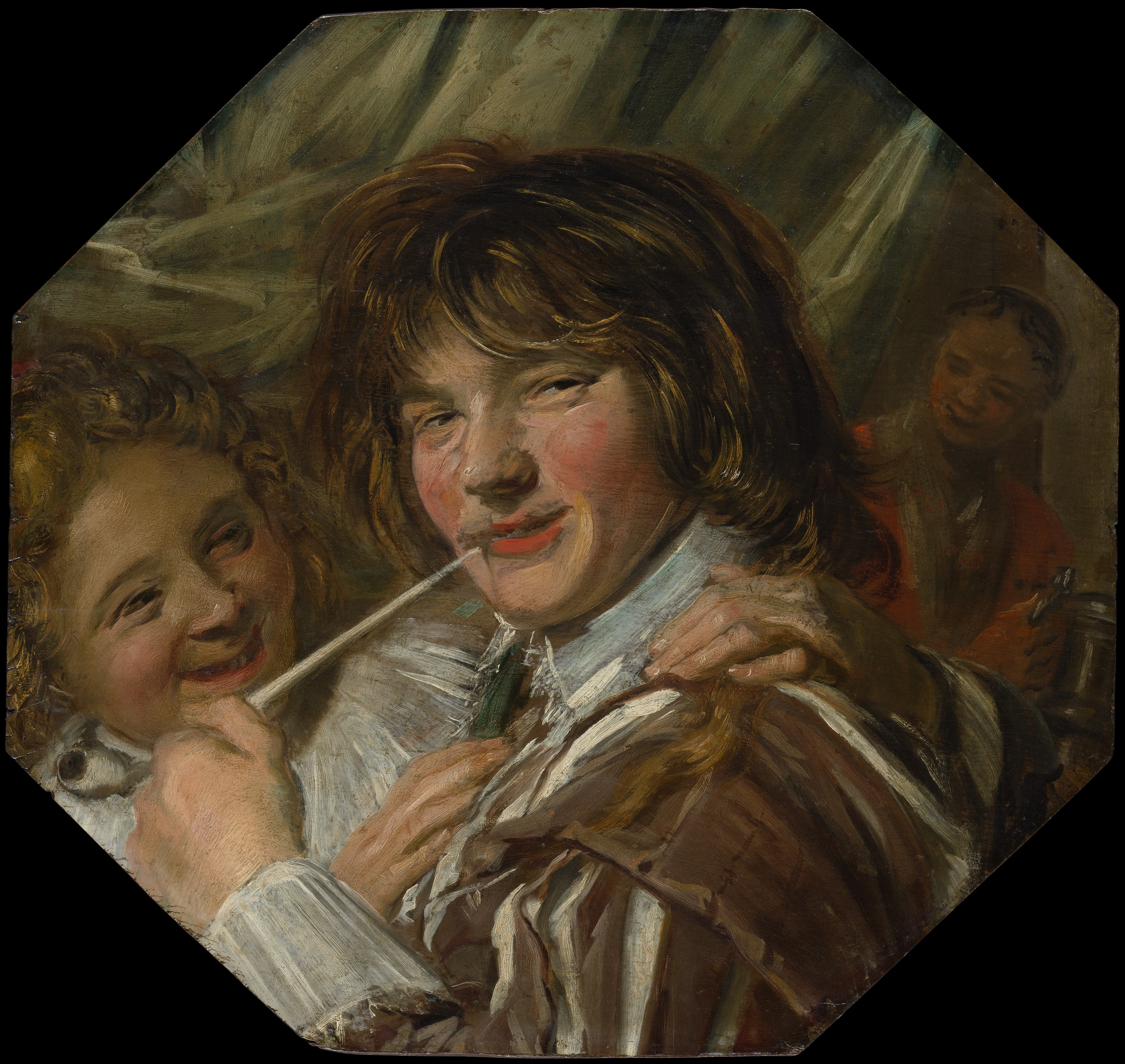
The Smoker, or Three Heads by Frans Hals (c. 1623–25)

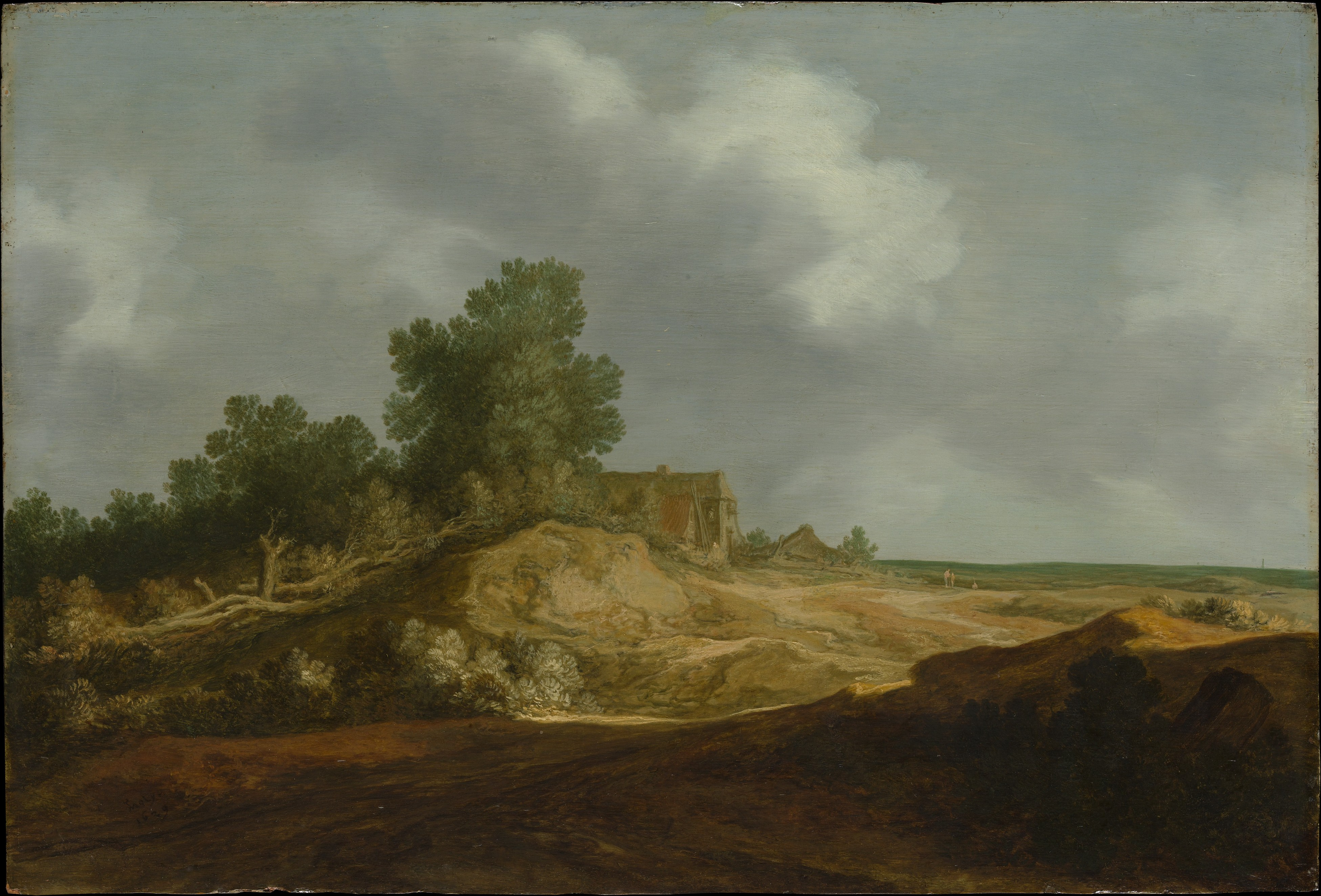
Landscape with a Cottage by Pieter de Molijn (1629)

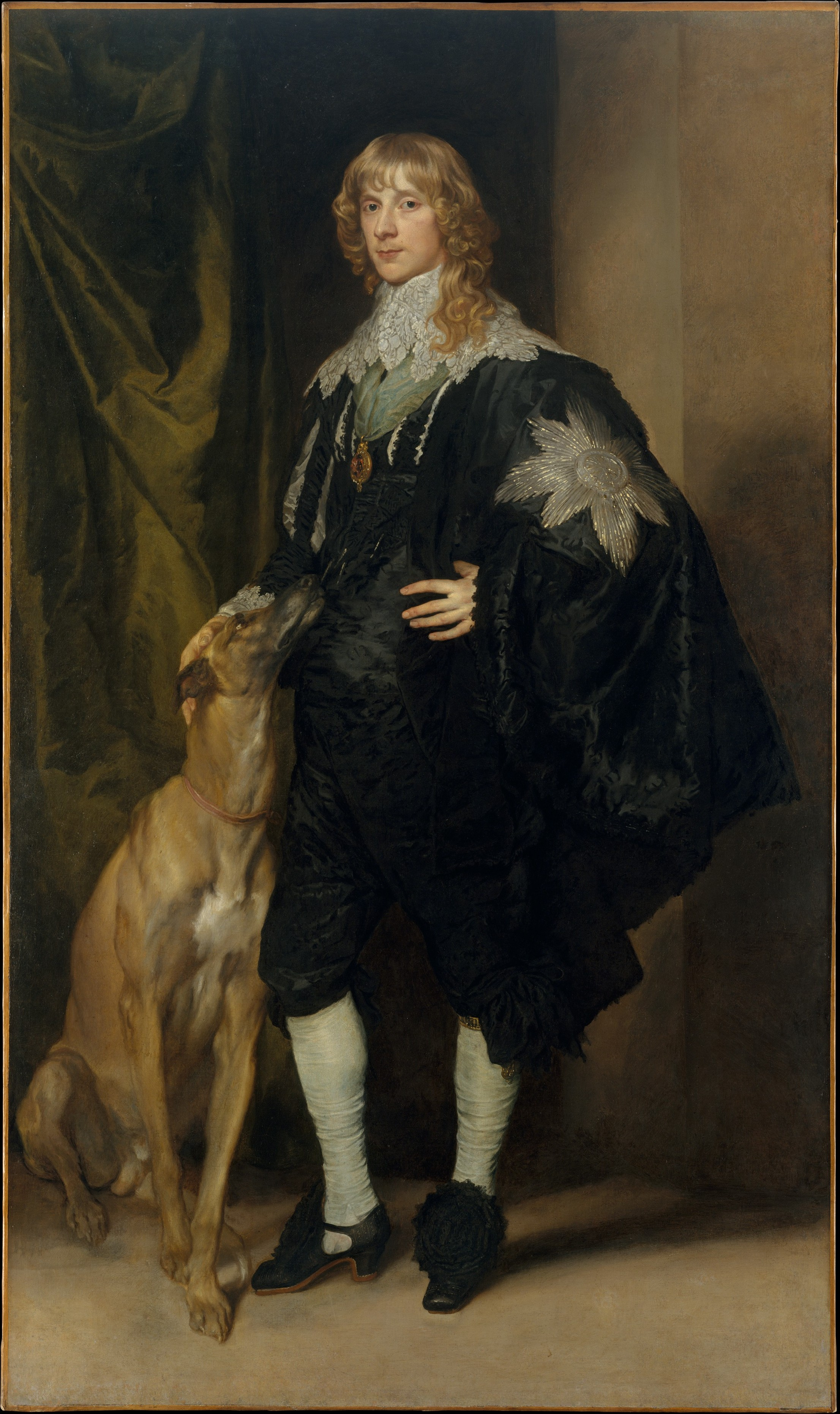
James Stuart, Duke of Richmond and Lennox by Anthony van Dyck (c. 1633–35)

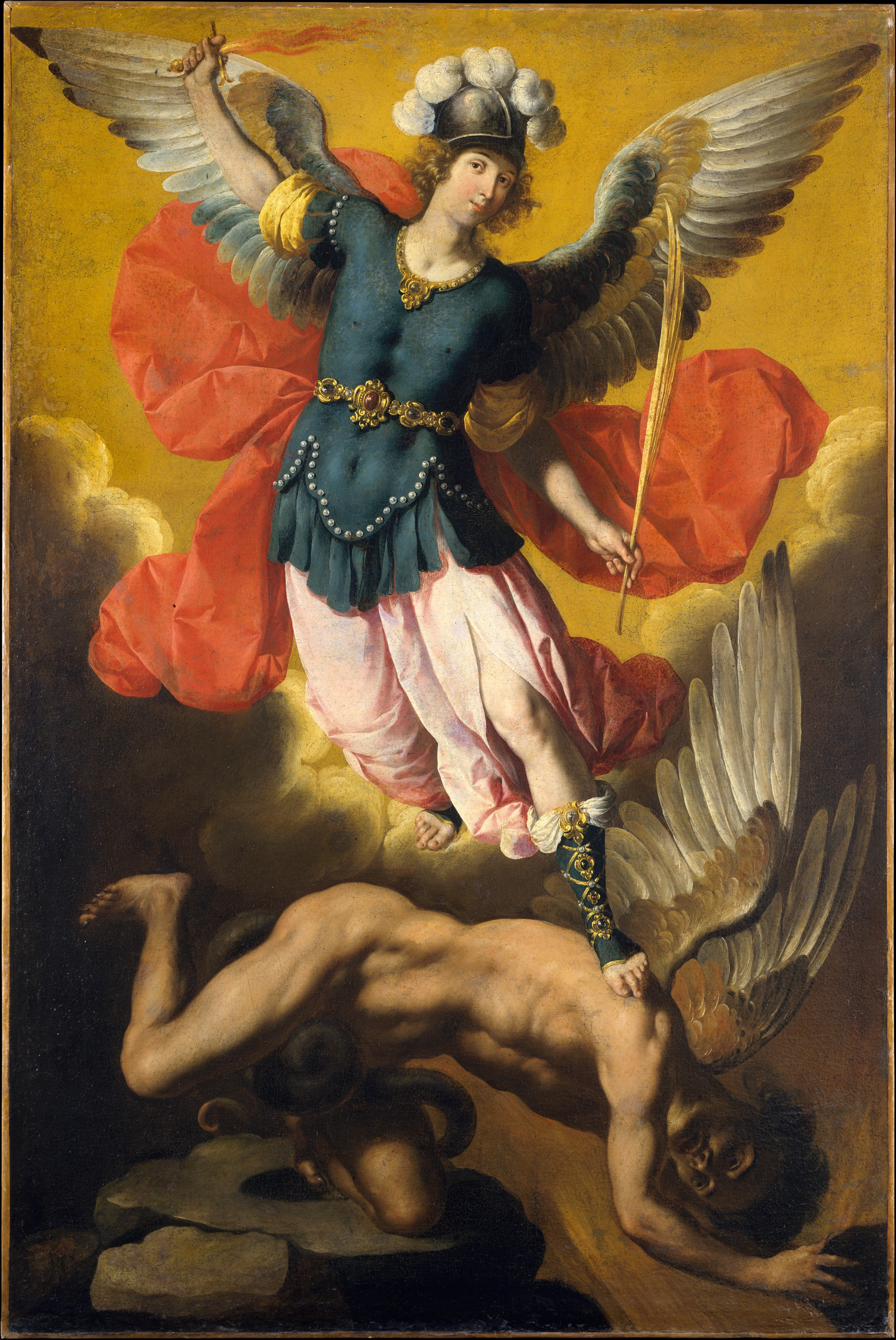
Saint Michael the Archangel by Ignacio de Ries (1640s)

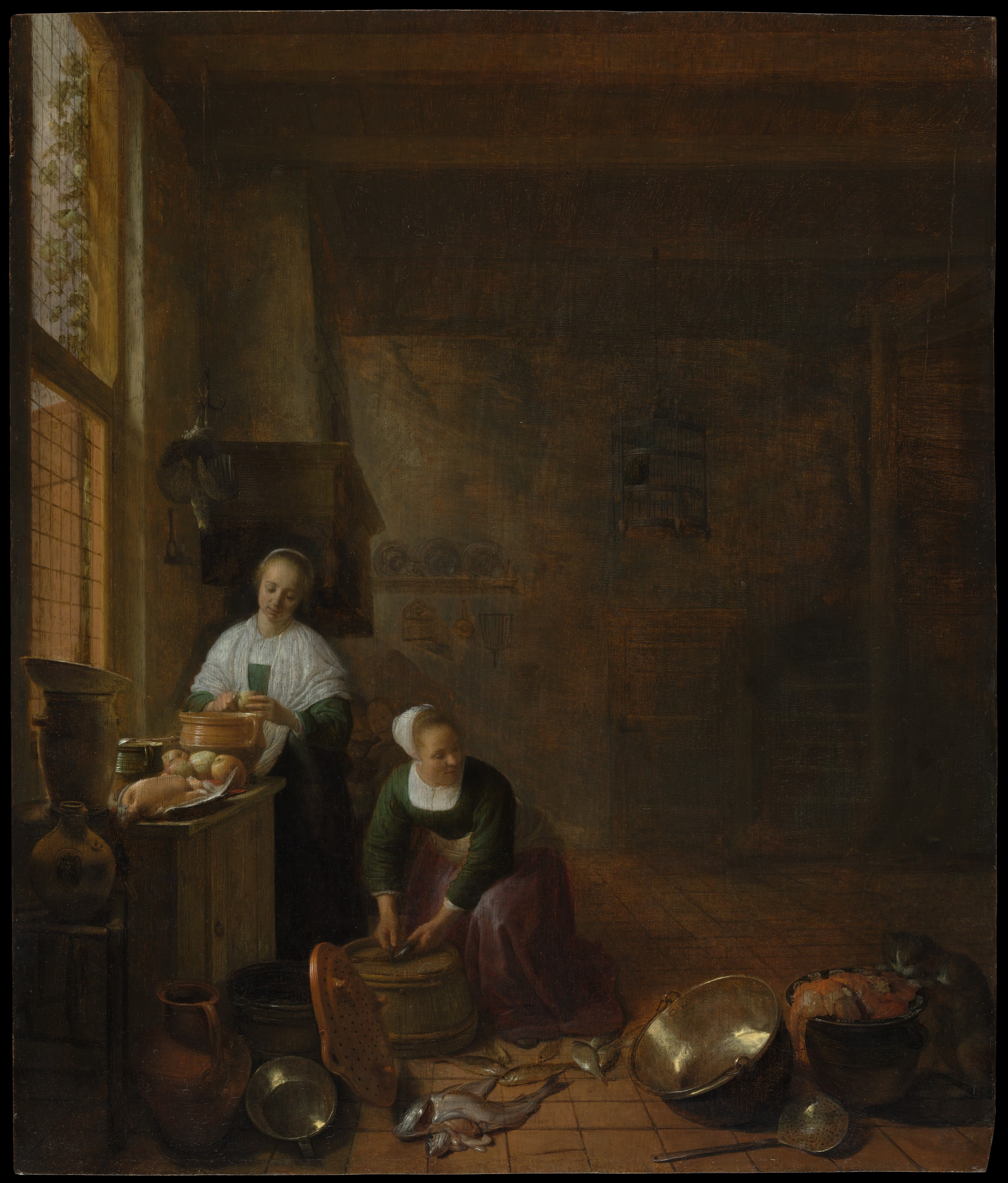
A Kitchen by Hendrik Martenszoon Sorgh (c. 1643)

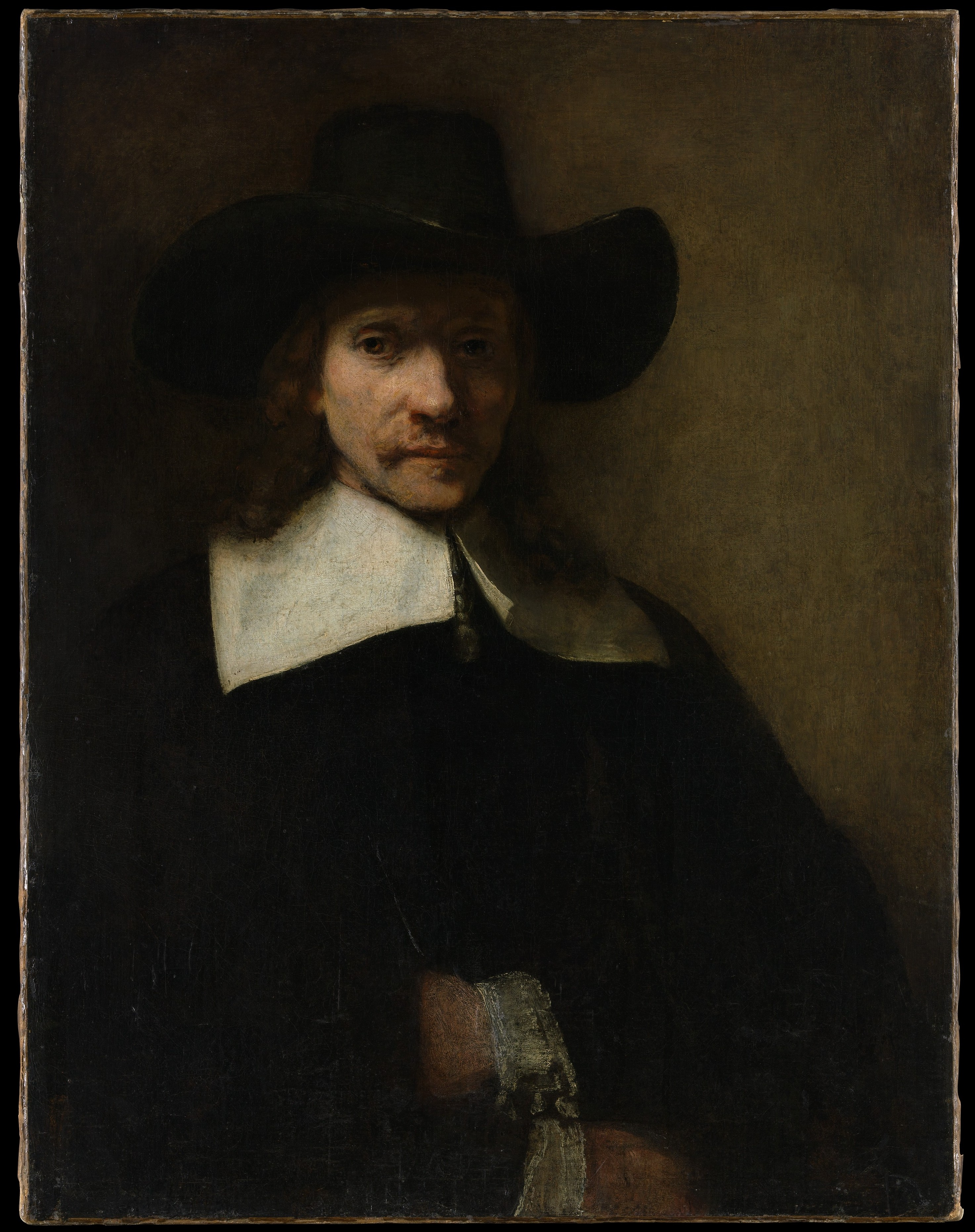
Portrait of a Man by Rembrandt (c. 1655–60)

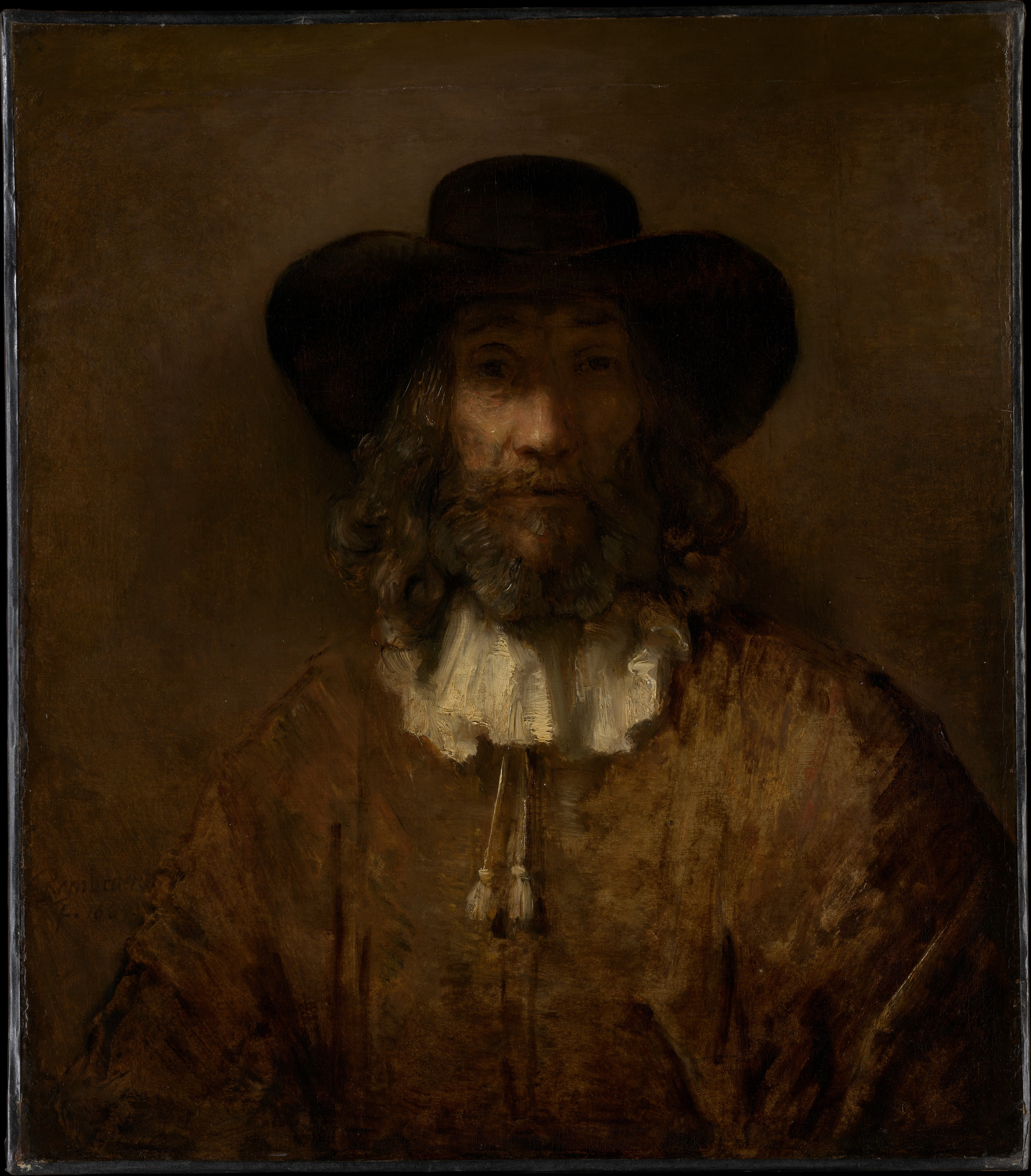
Man with a Beard by Rembrandt (17th century)

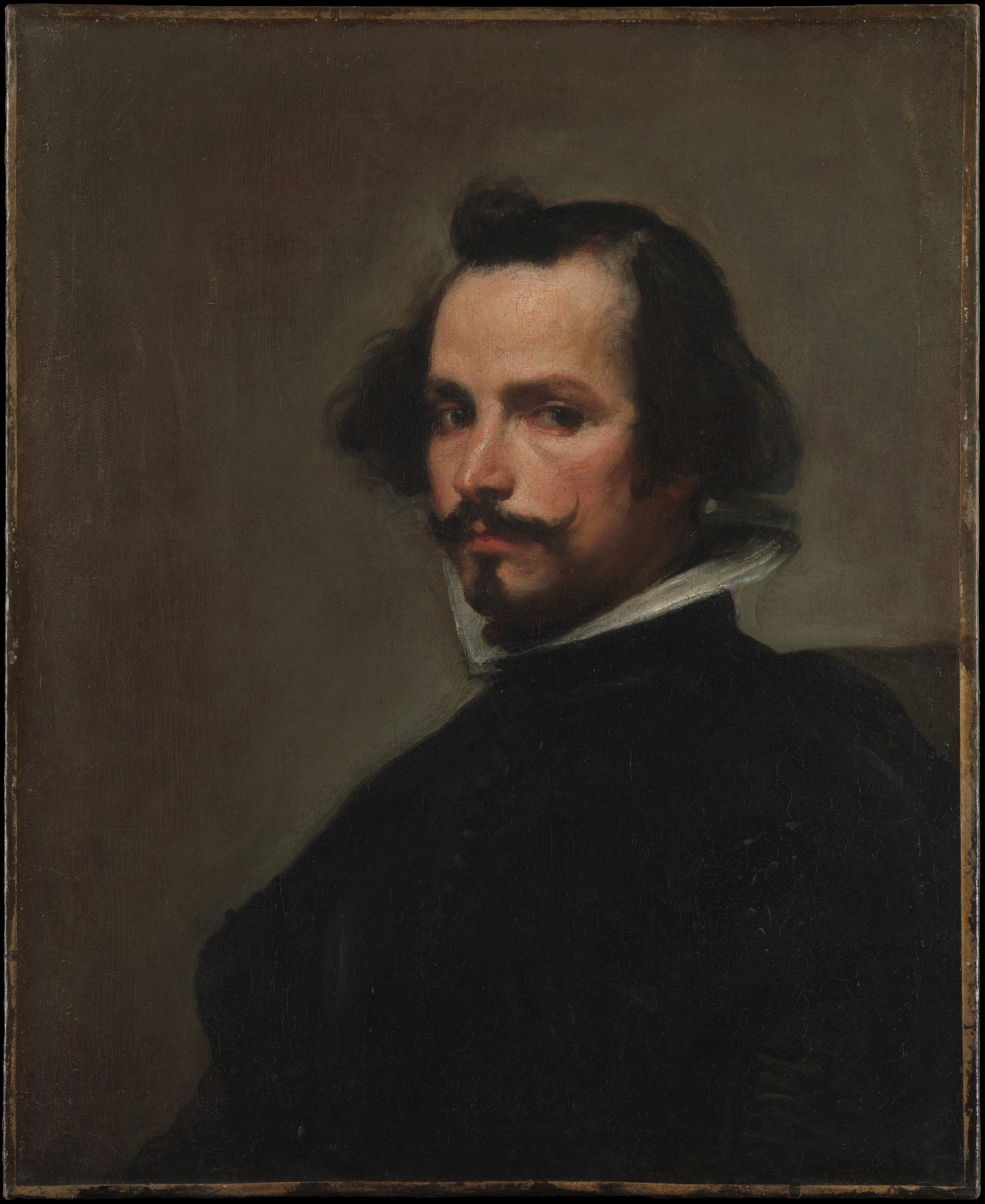
Portrait of a Man by Diego Velázquez (c. 1650)

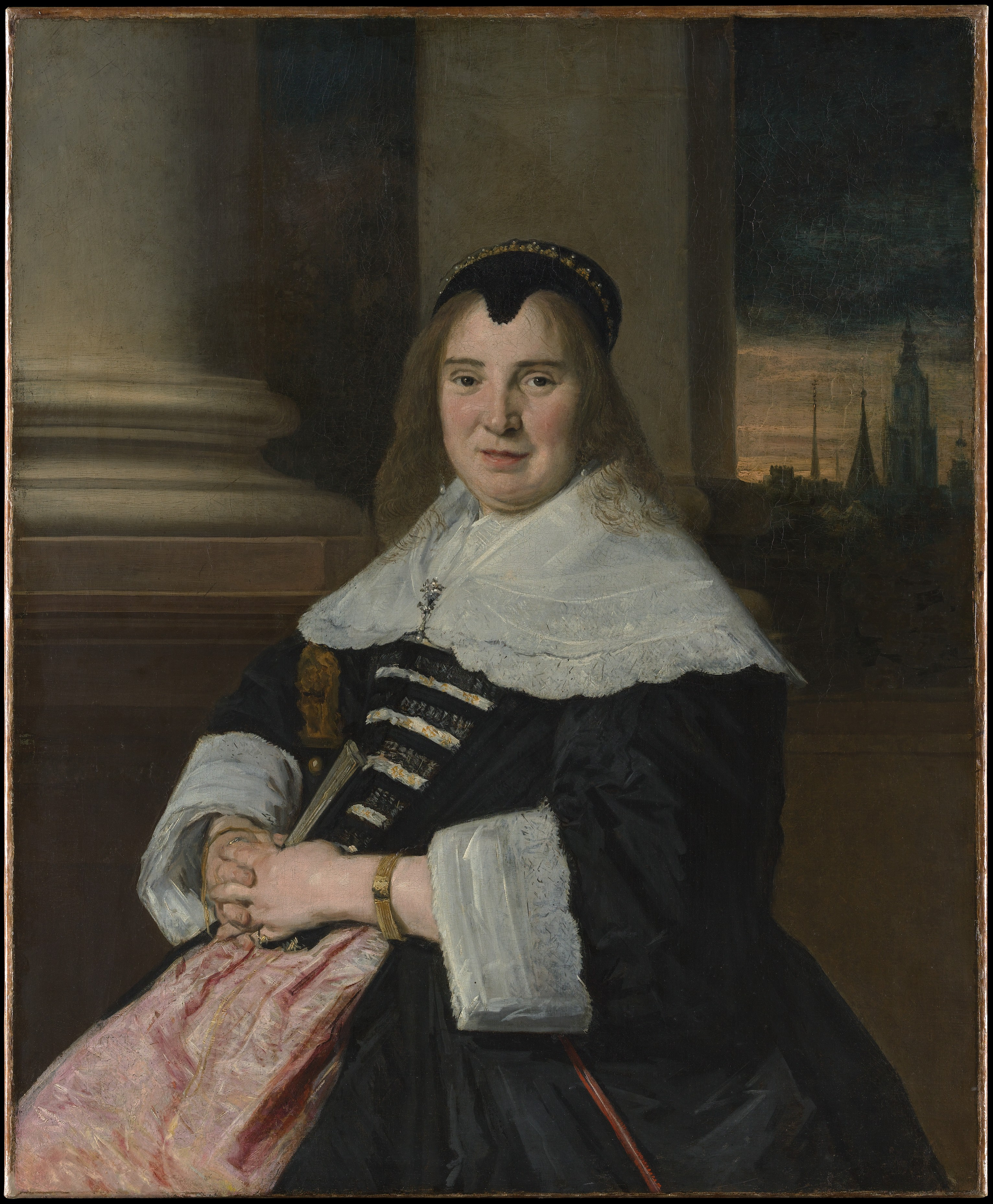
Portrait of a Woman by Frans Hals (c. 1650)

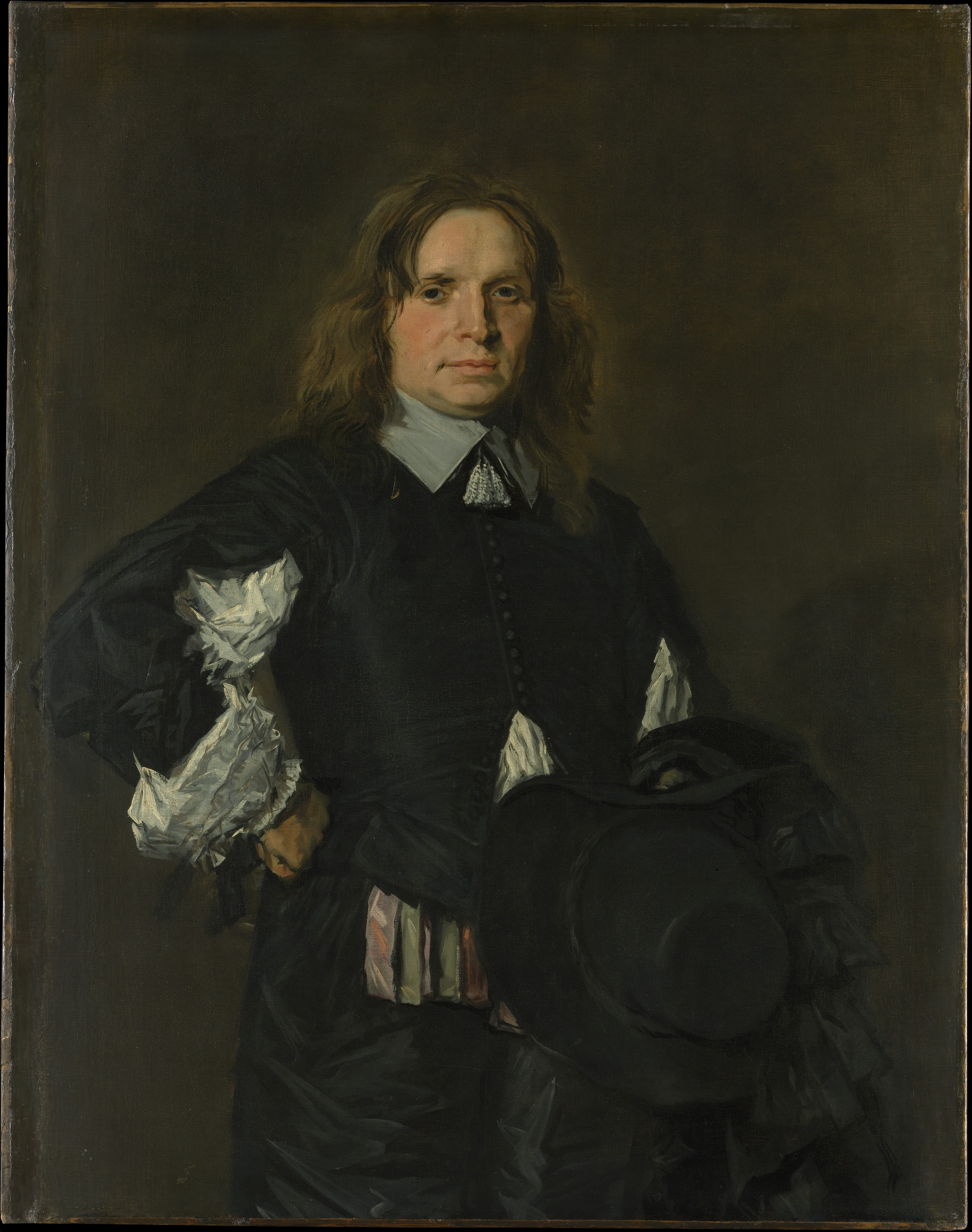
Portrait of a Man by Frans Hals (early 1650s)

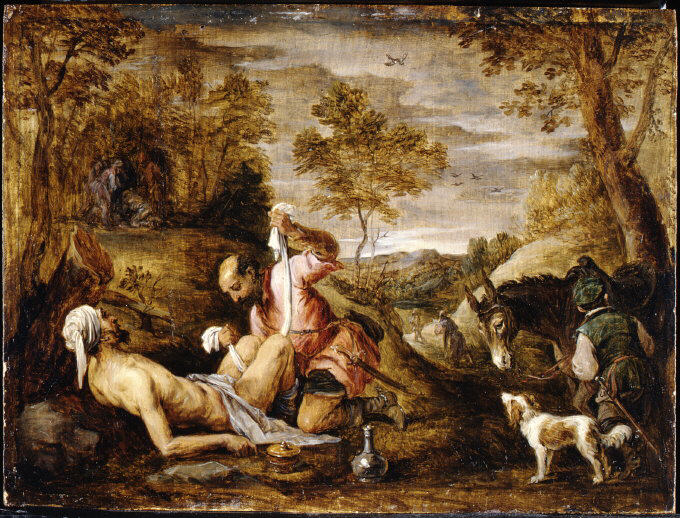
The Good Samaritan by David Teniers the Younger (between 1651 and 1656)

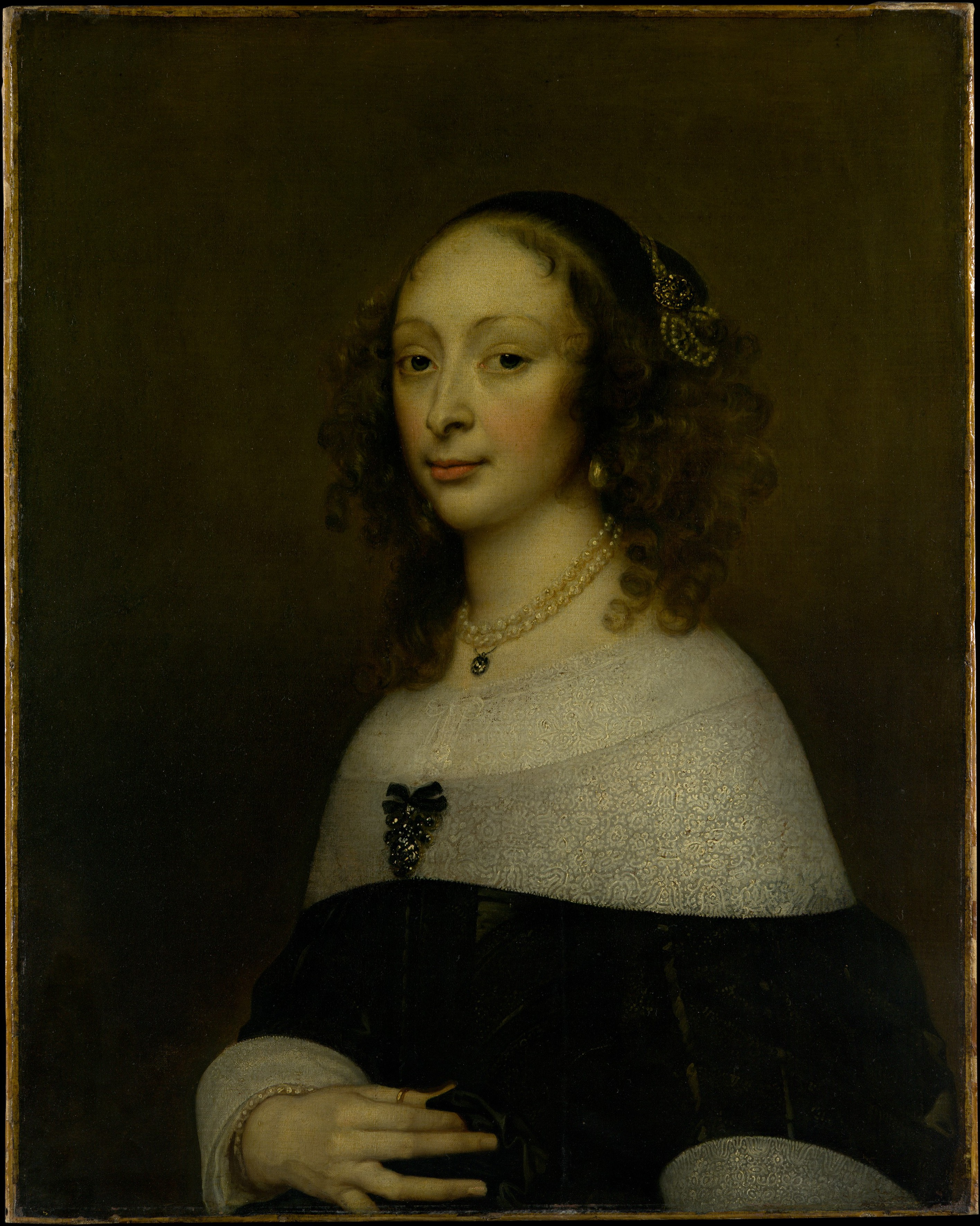
Portrait of a Woman by Adriaen Hanneman (c. 1653)

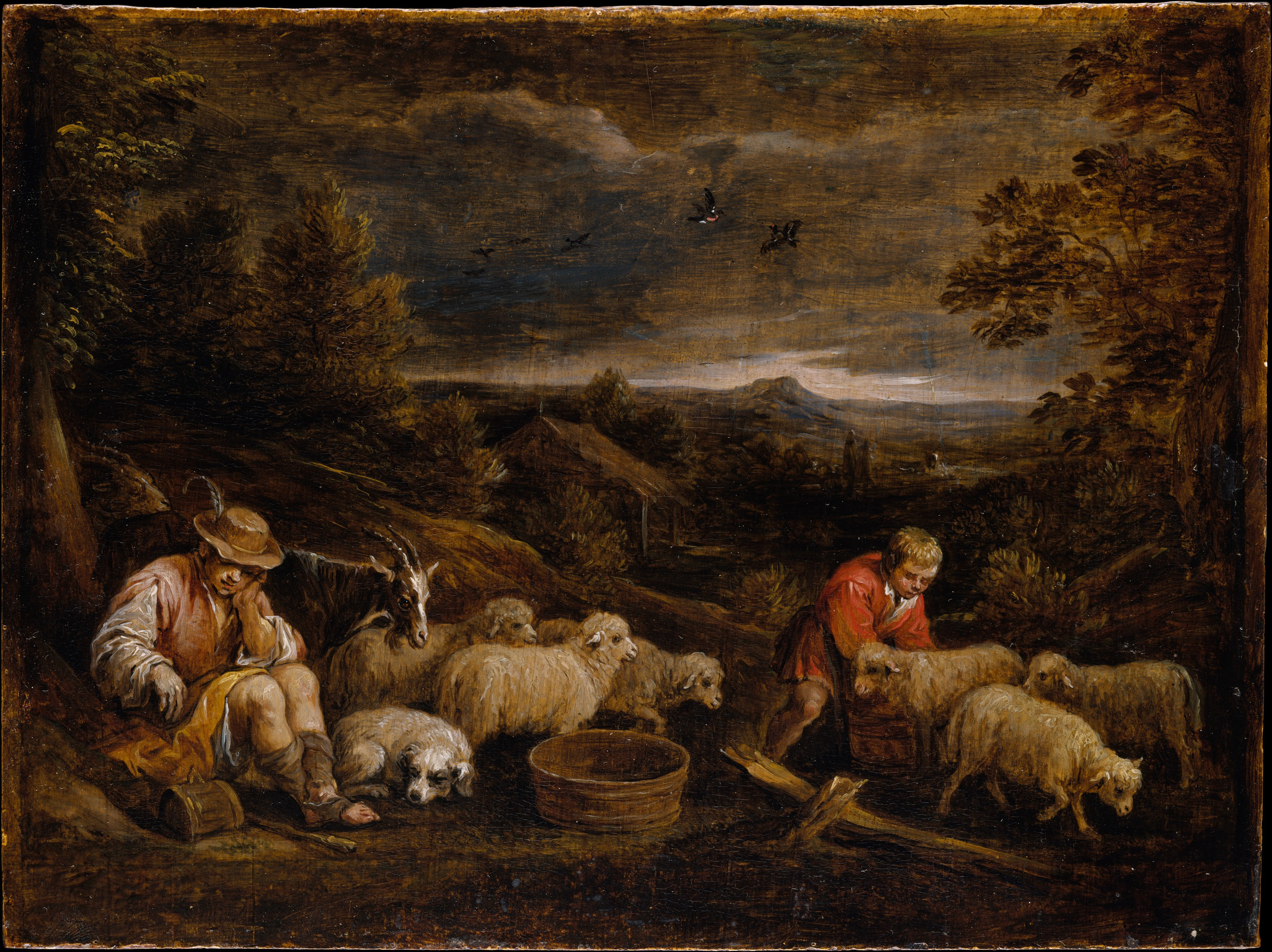
Shepherds and Sheep by David Teniers the Younger (1650s)

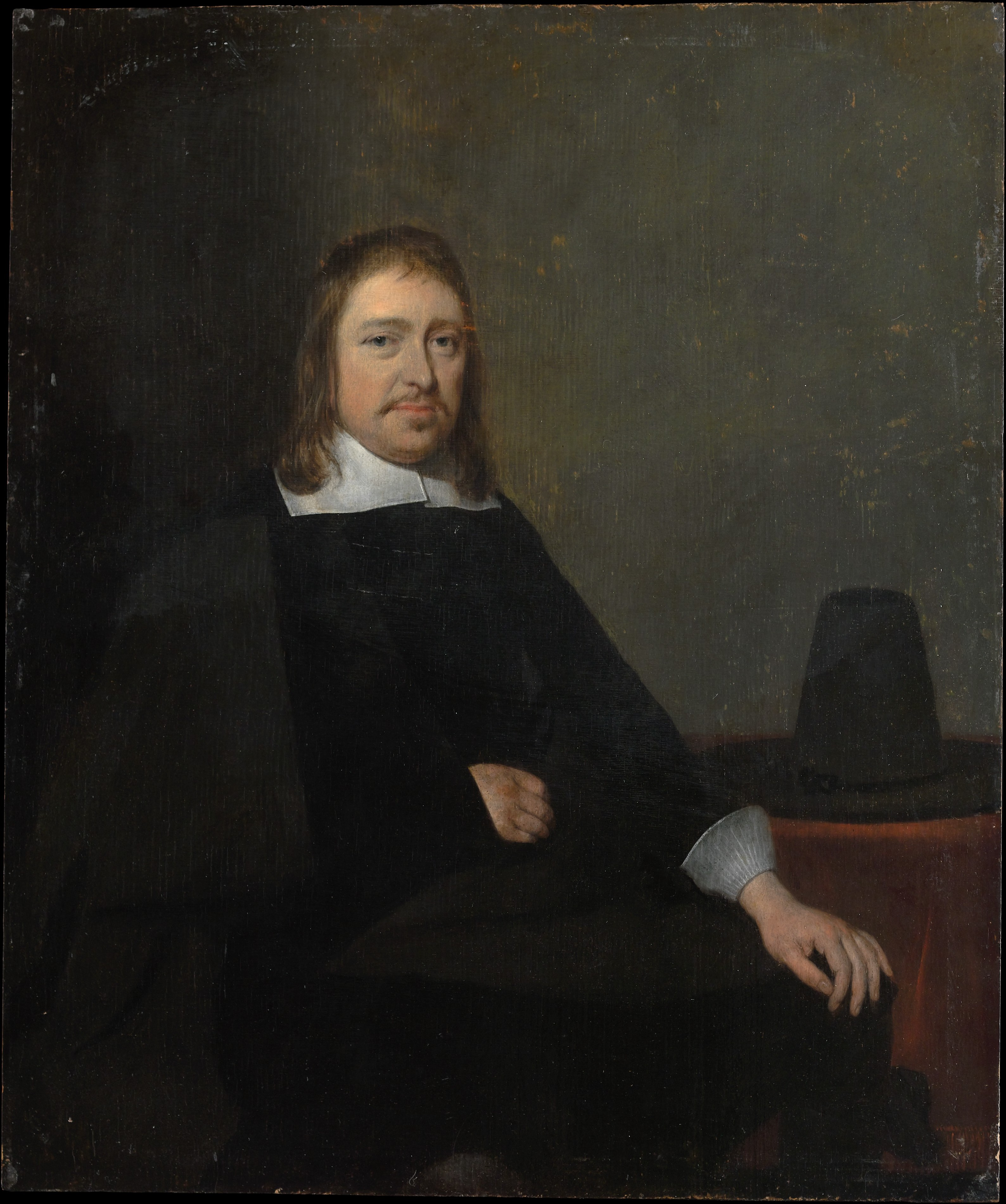
Portrait of a Seated Man by Gerard ter Borch (late 1650s or early 1660s)

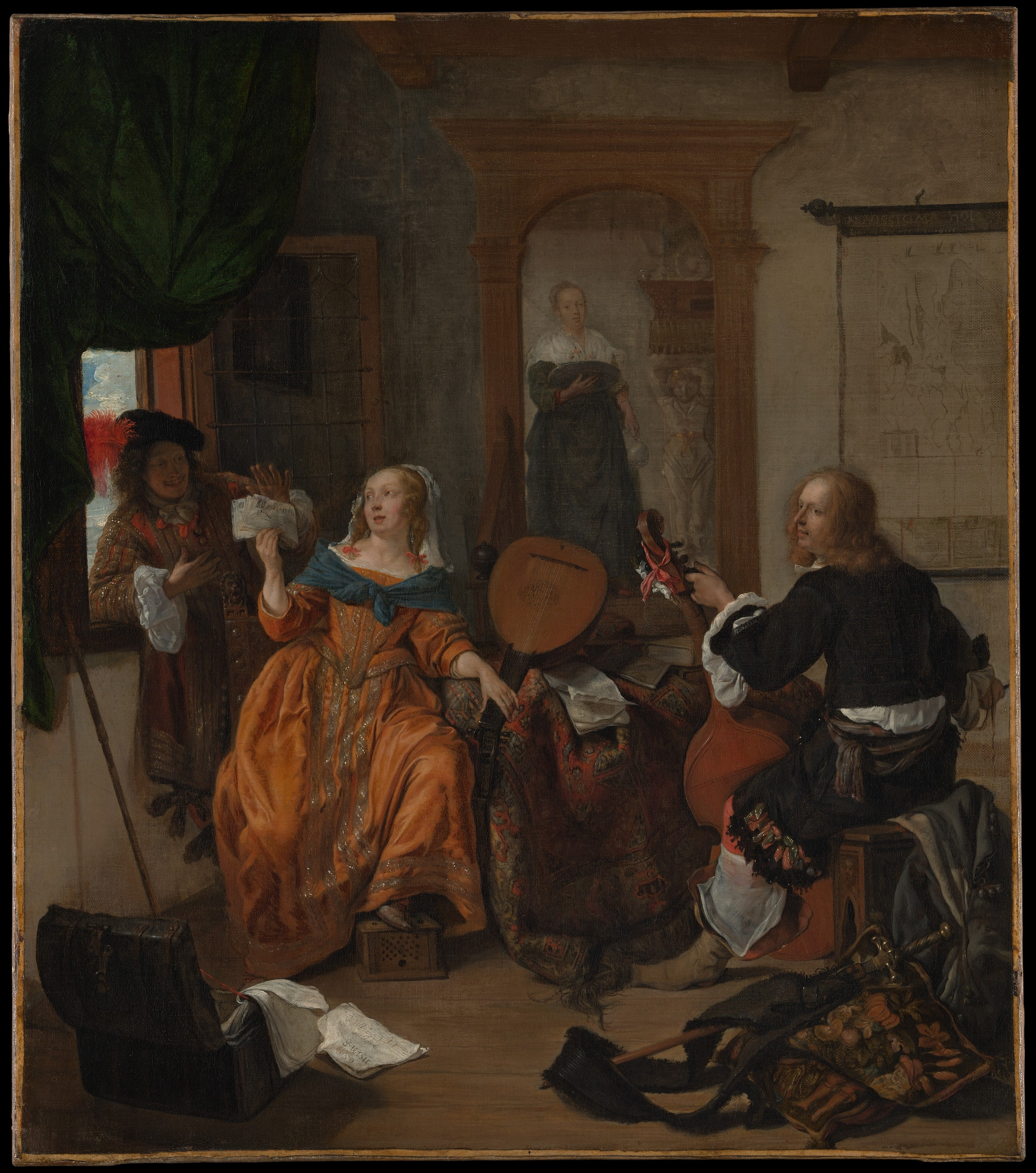
A Musical Party by Gabriel Metsu (1659)

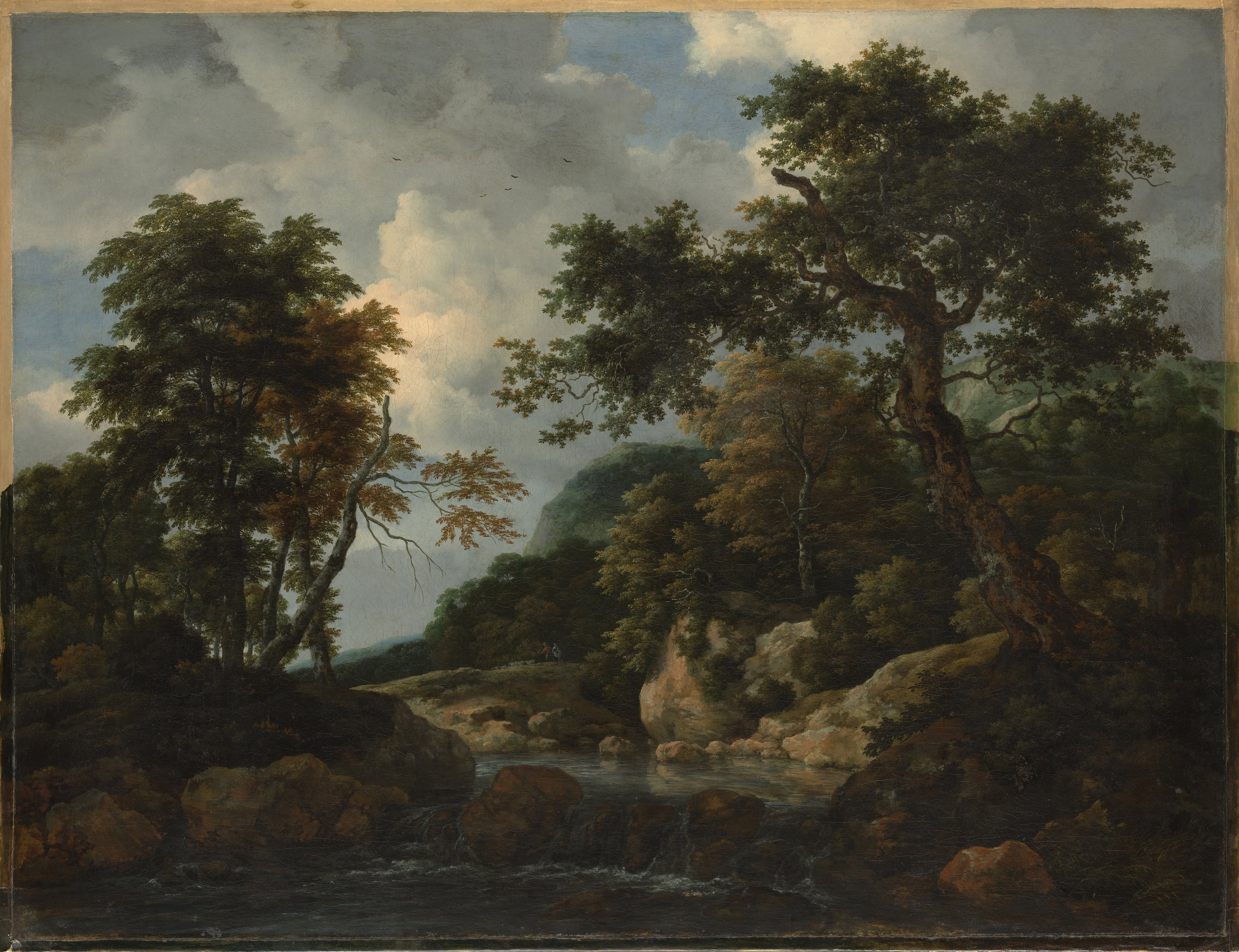
The Forest Stream by Jacob van Ruisdael (c. 1660)

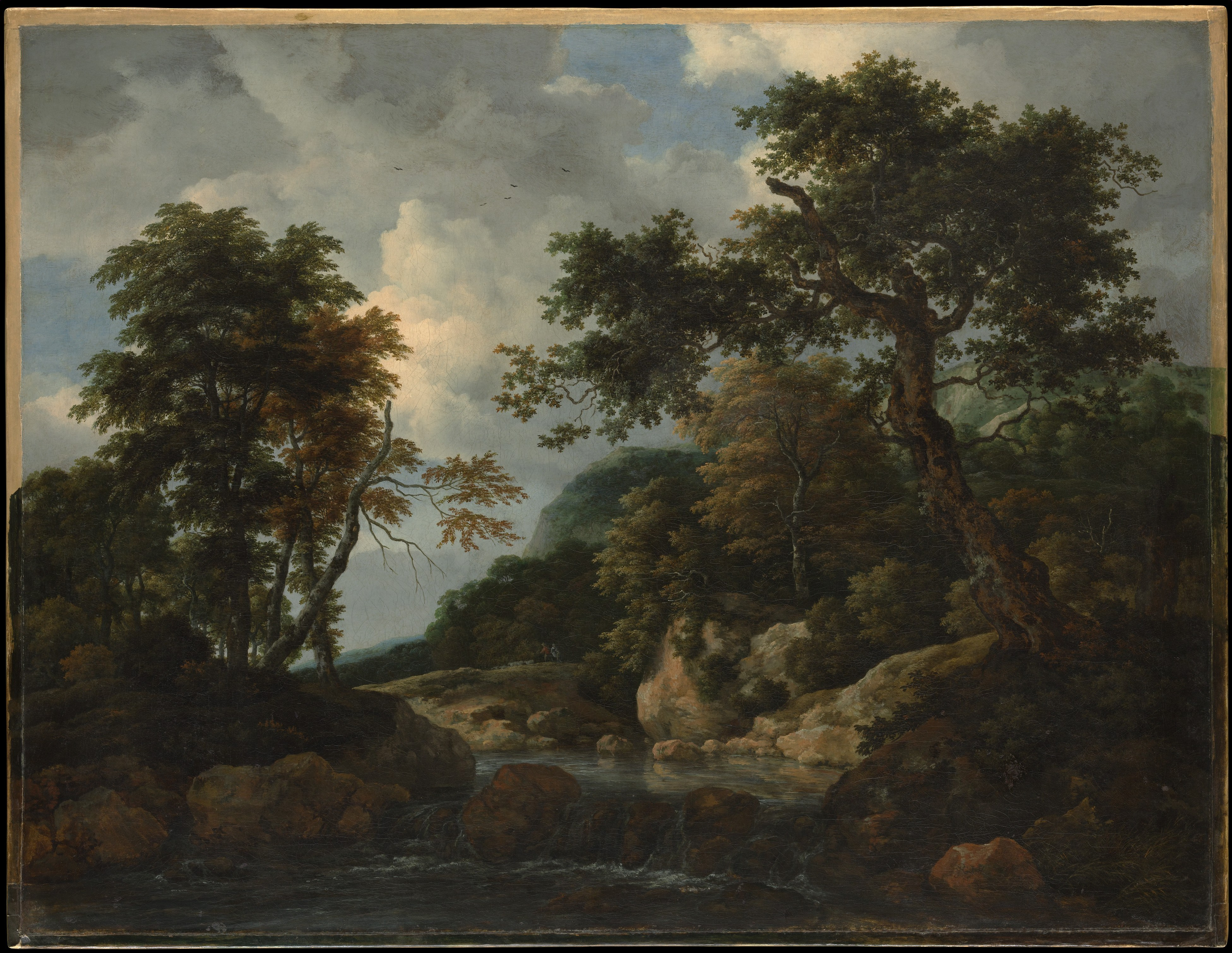
The Forest Stream by Jacob van Ruisdael (c. 1660)

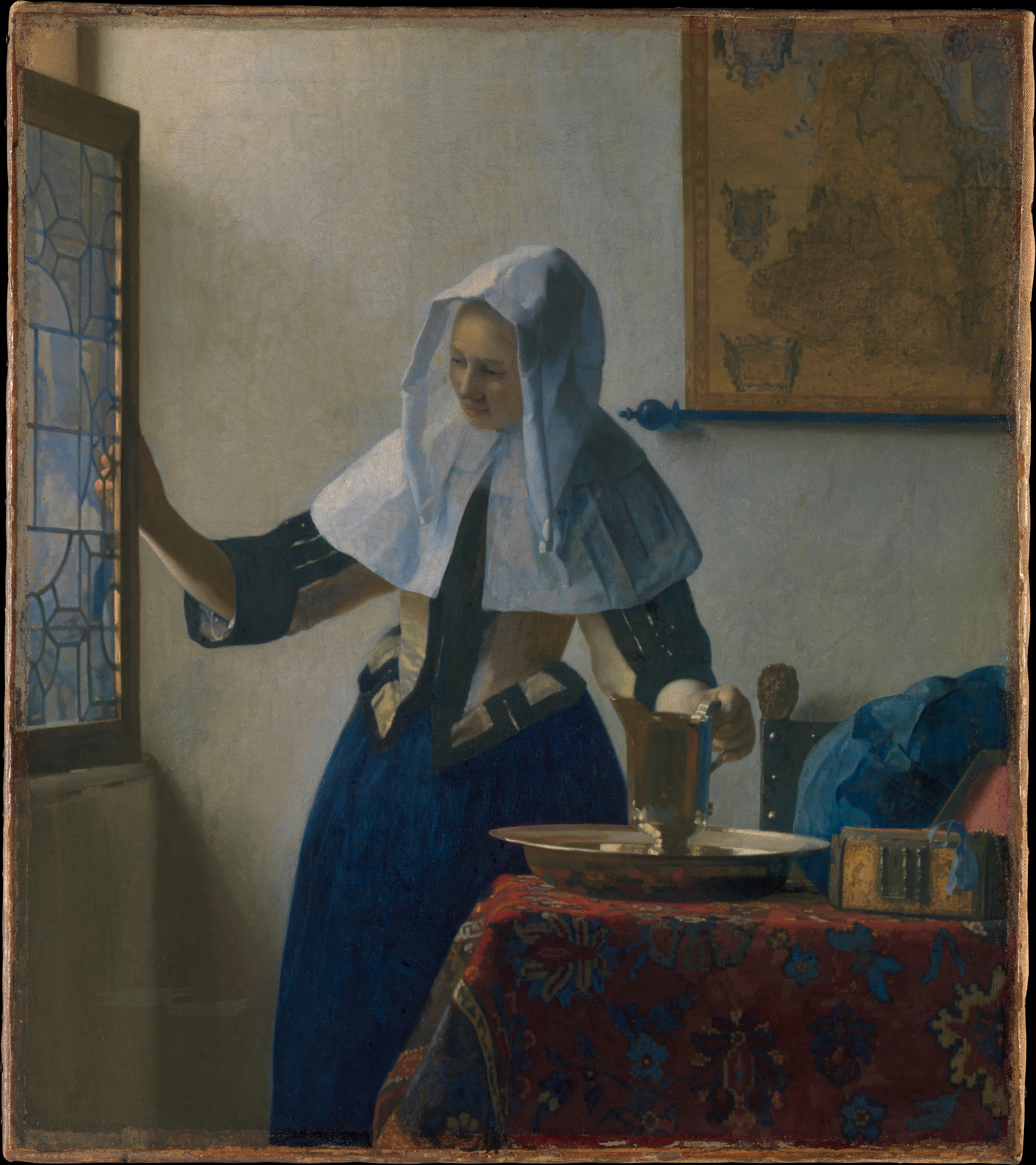
Woman with a Water Jug by Johannes Vermeer (c. 1662)

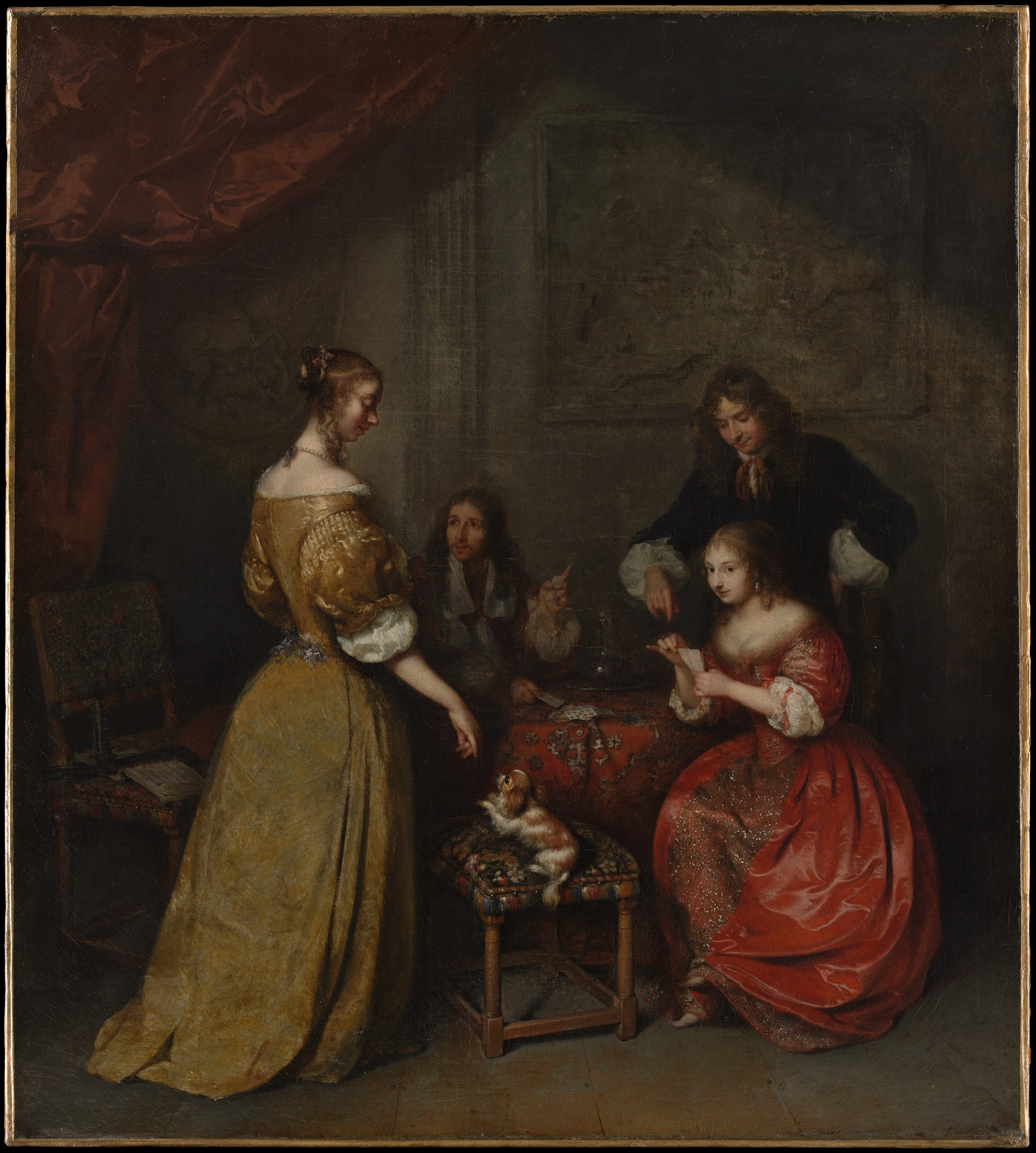
The Card Party by Caspar Netscher (c. 1665)

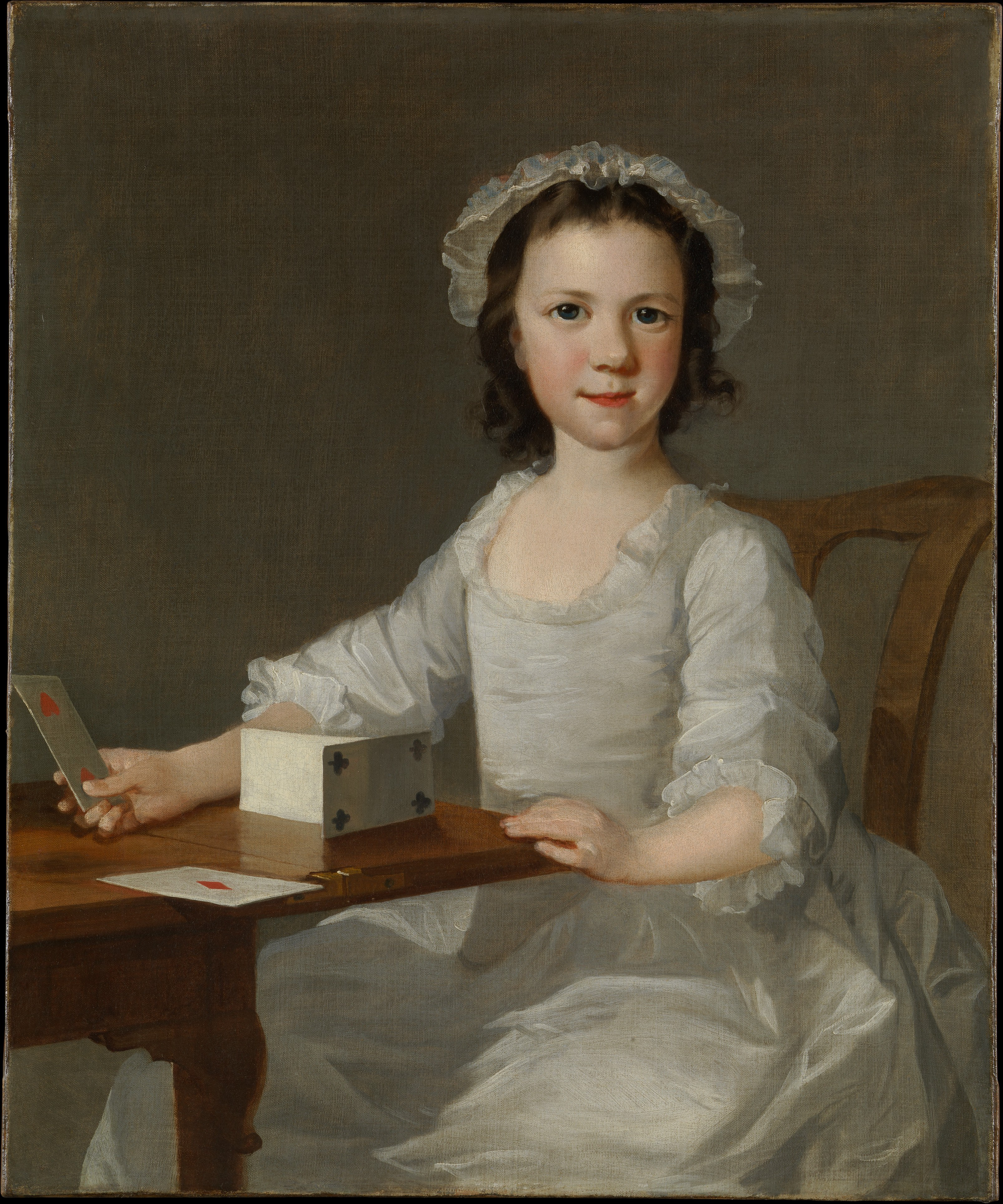
Girl Building a House of Cards by Thomas Frye (mid-18th century)

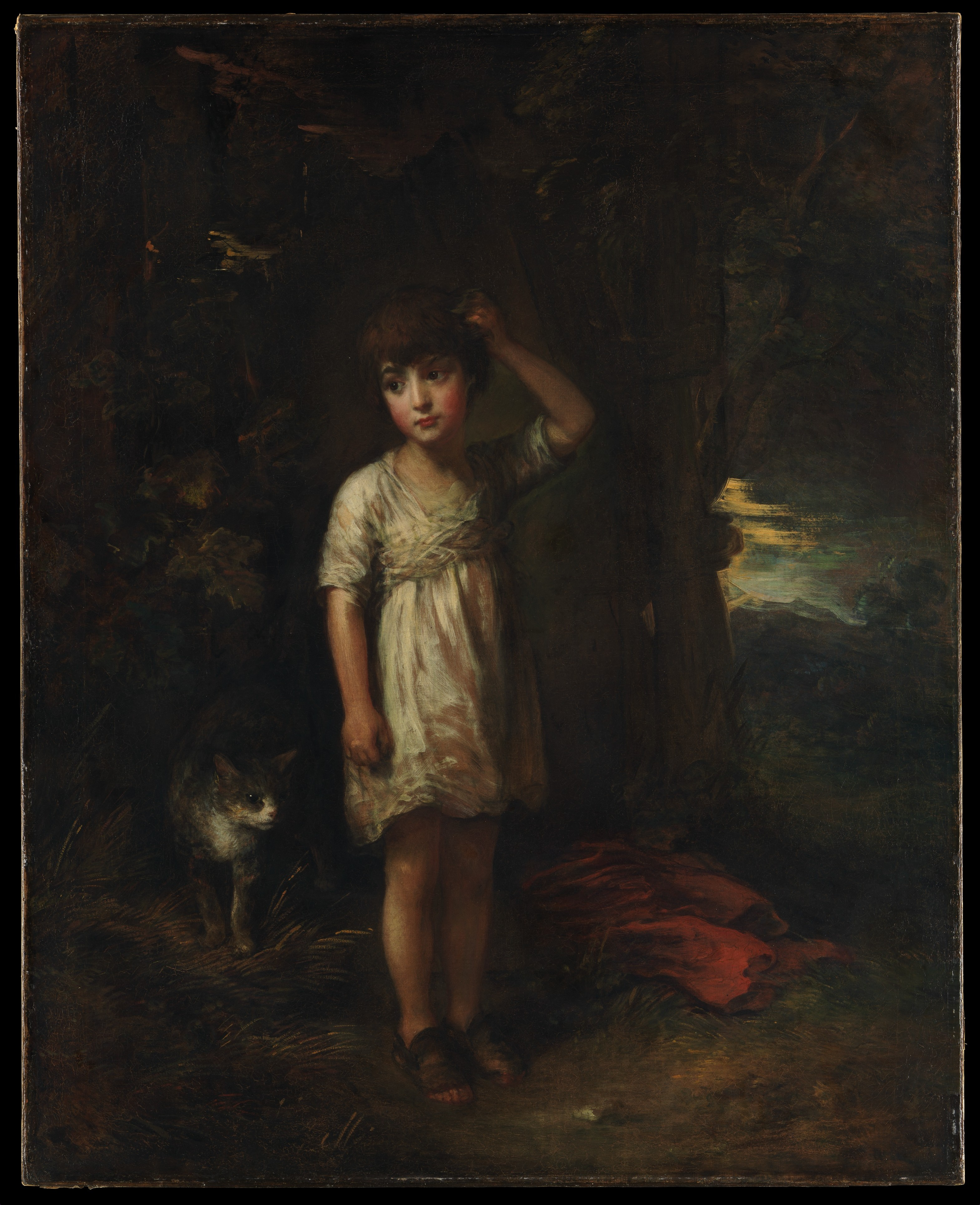
A Boy with a Cat—Morning by Thomas Gainsborough (1787)

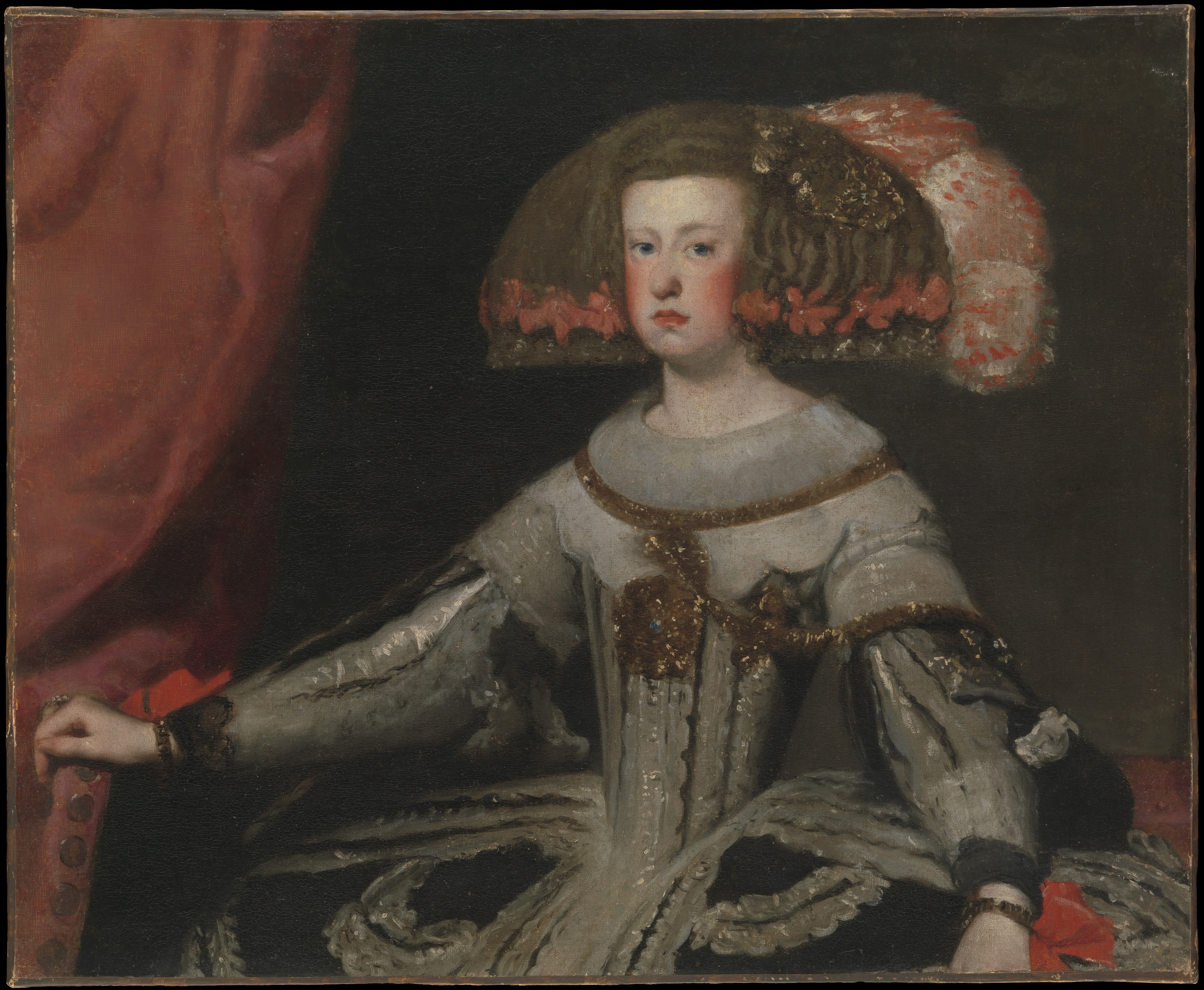
Mariana of Austria, Queen of Spain by Diego Velázquez (17th century)

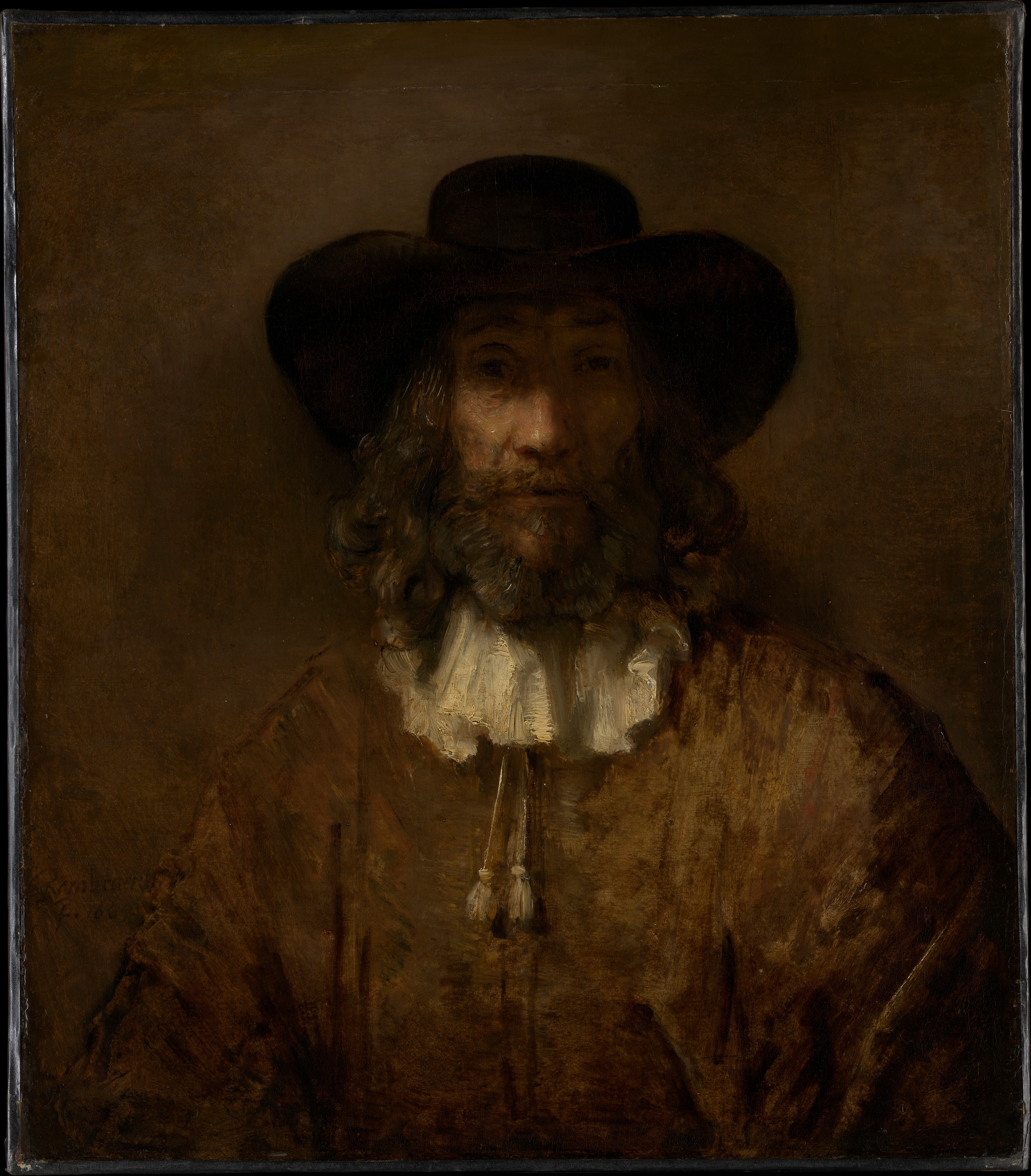
Man with a Beard by School of Rembrandt (17th century)

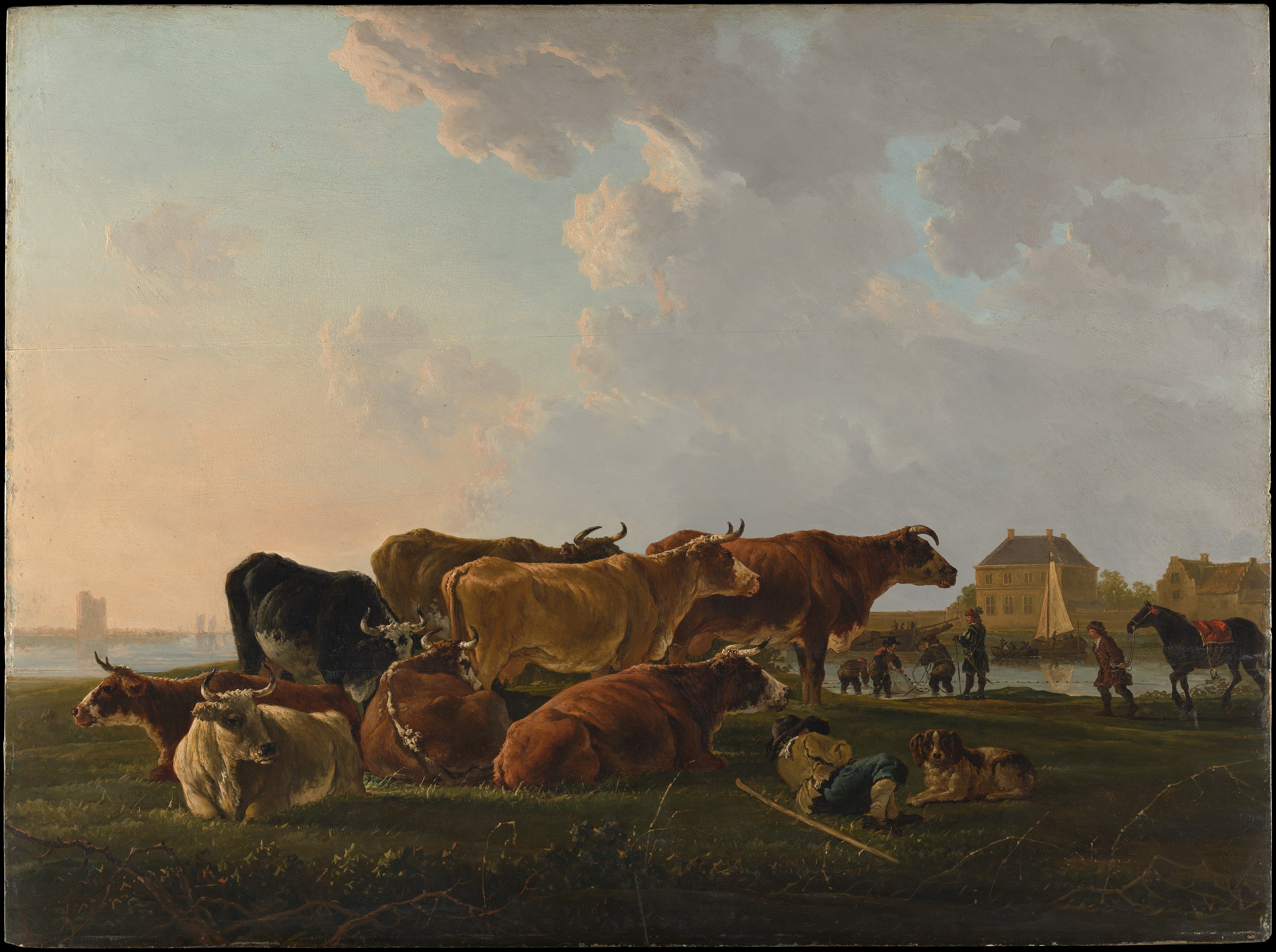
Landscape with Cattle by Jacob van Strij (c. 1800)

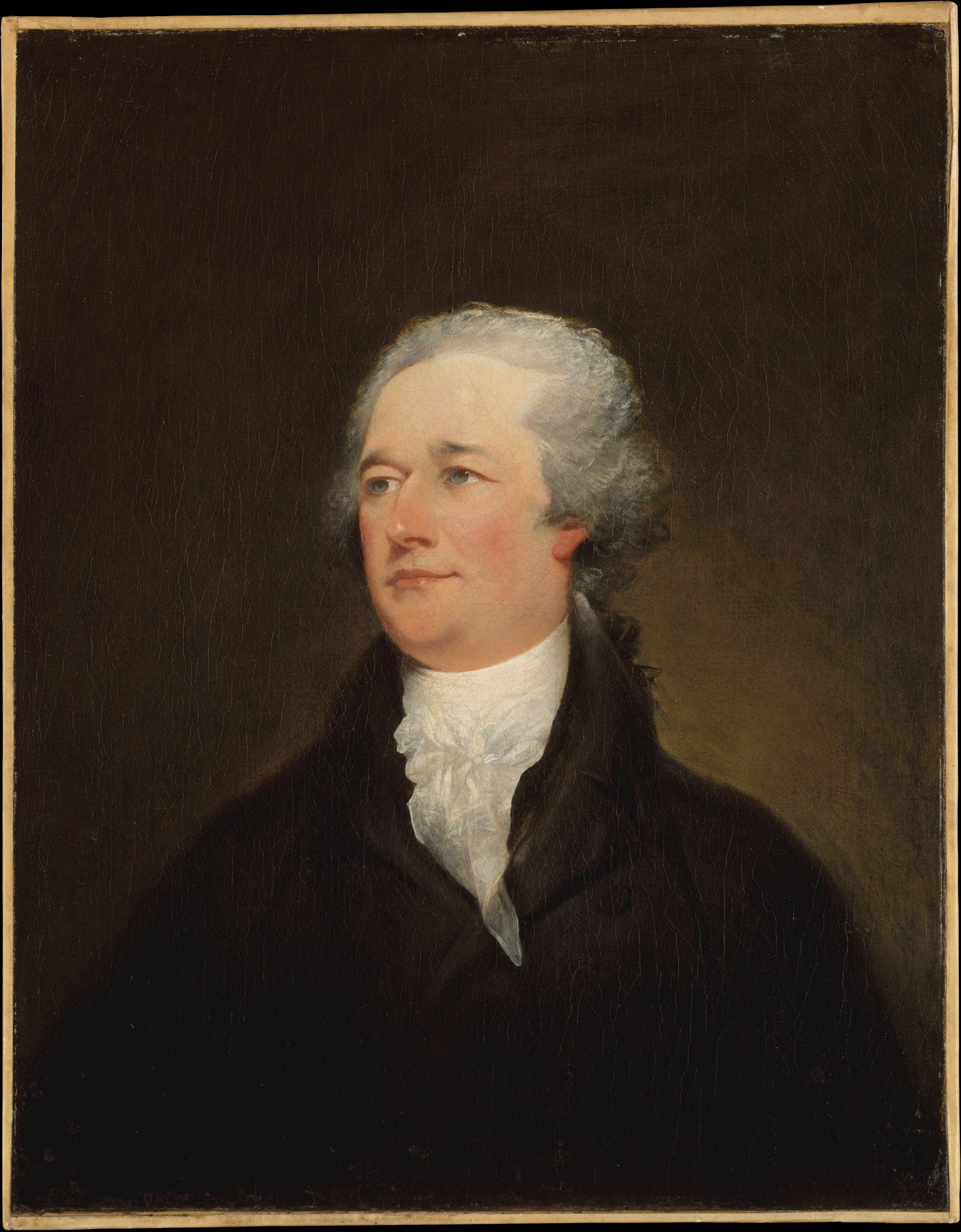
Portrait of Alexander Hamilton by John Trumbull (1804–6)

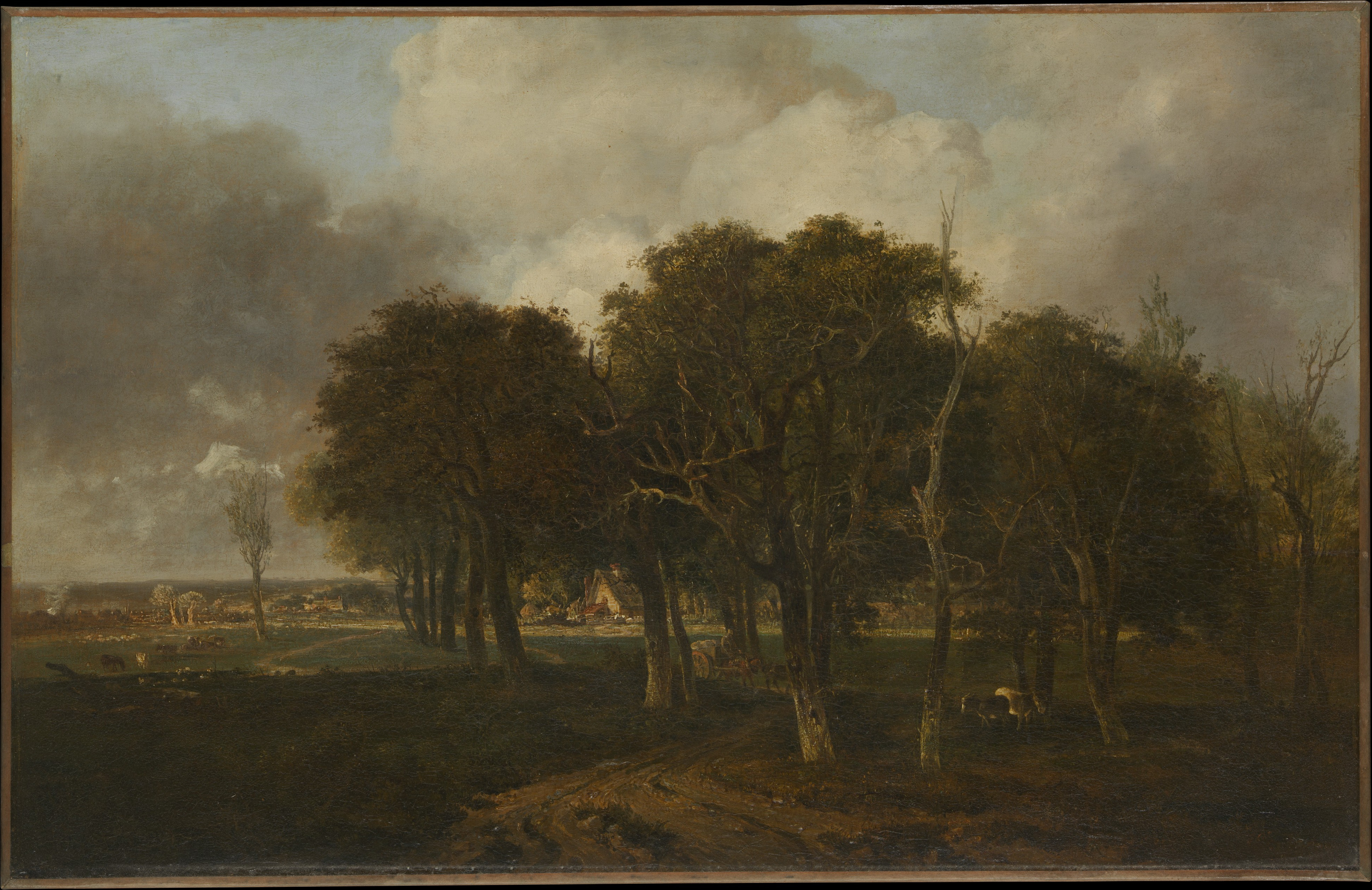
Hautbois Common, Norfolk by John Crome (c. 1810)

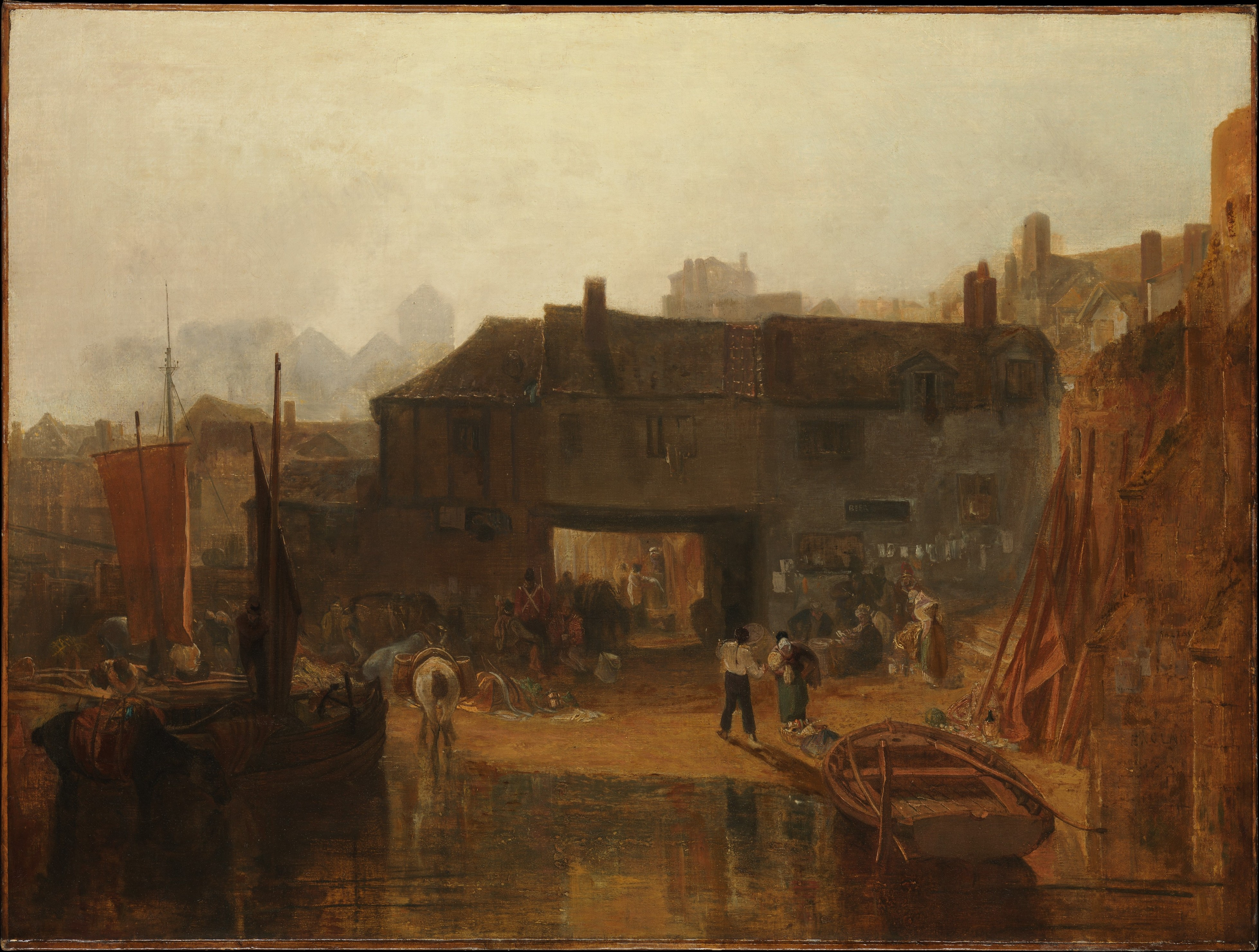
Saltash with the Water Ferry, Cornwall by J. M. W. Turner (1811)

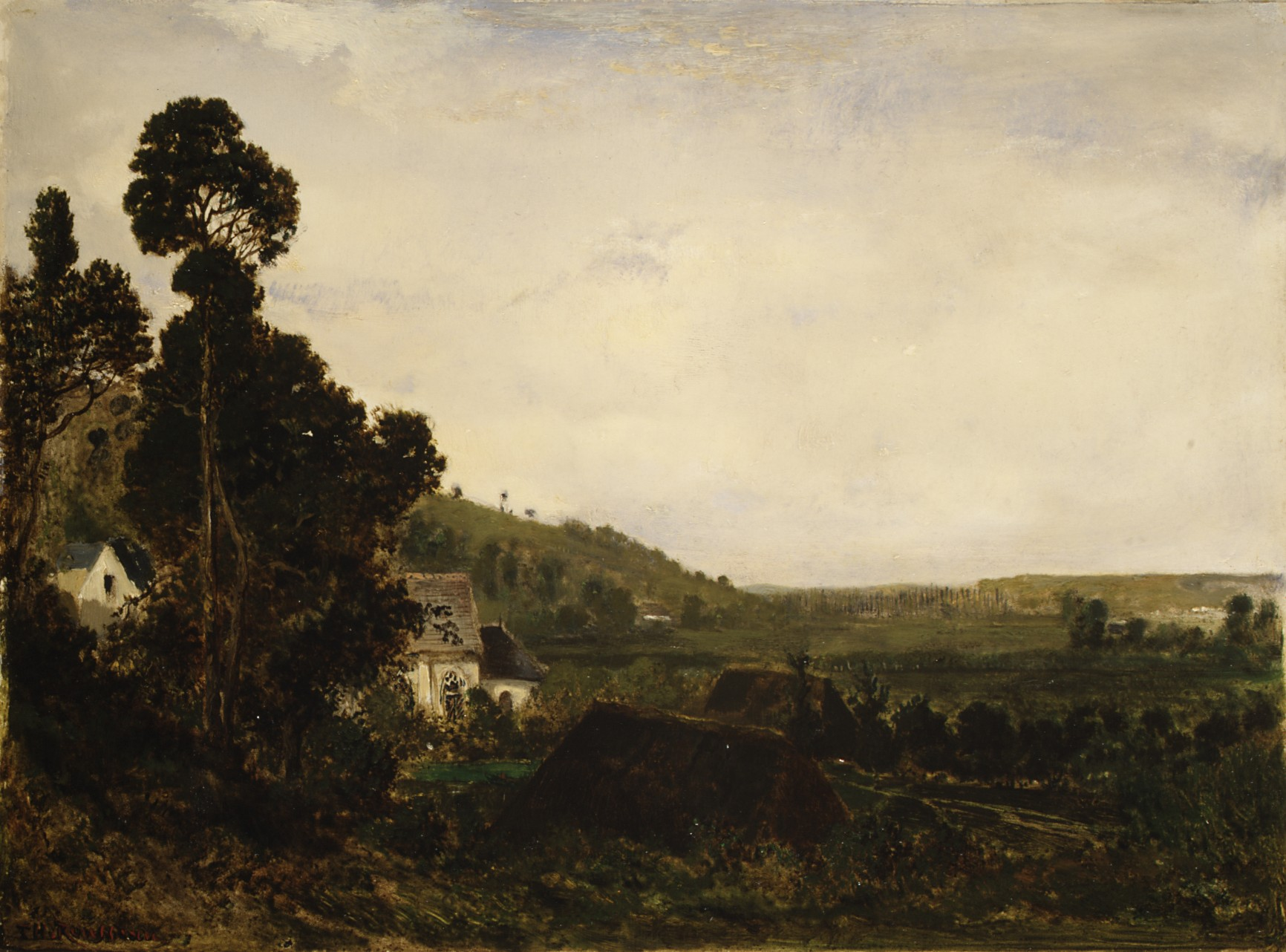
An Old Chapel in a Valley by Théodore Rousseau (c. 1835)

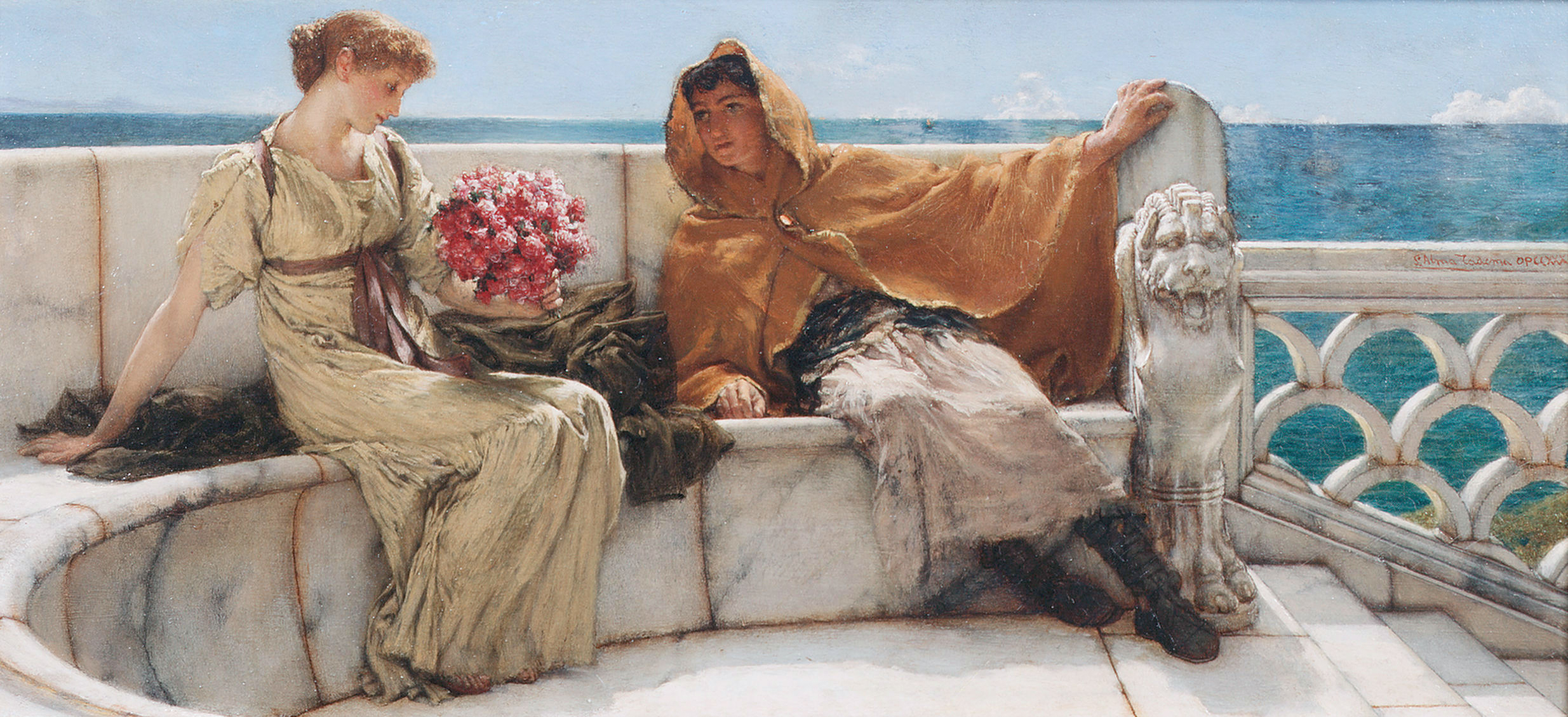
Amo Te, Ama Me by Sir Lawrence Alma-Tadema (1881)

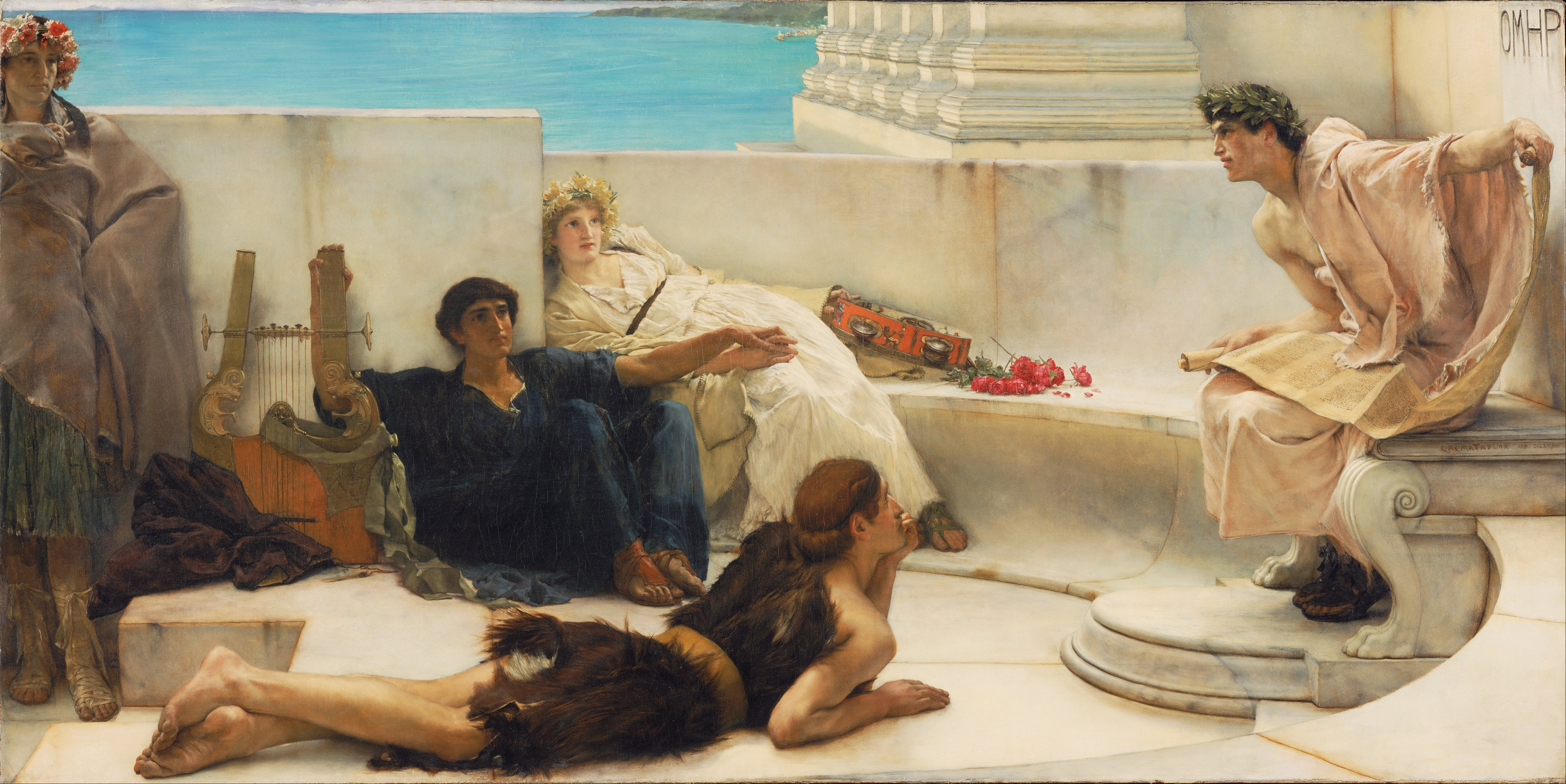
A Reading from Homer Sir Lawrence Alma-Tadema (1885)

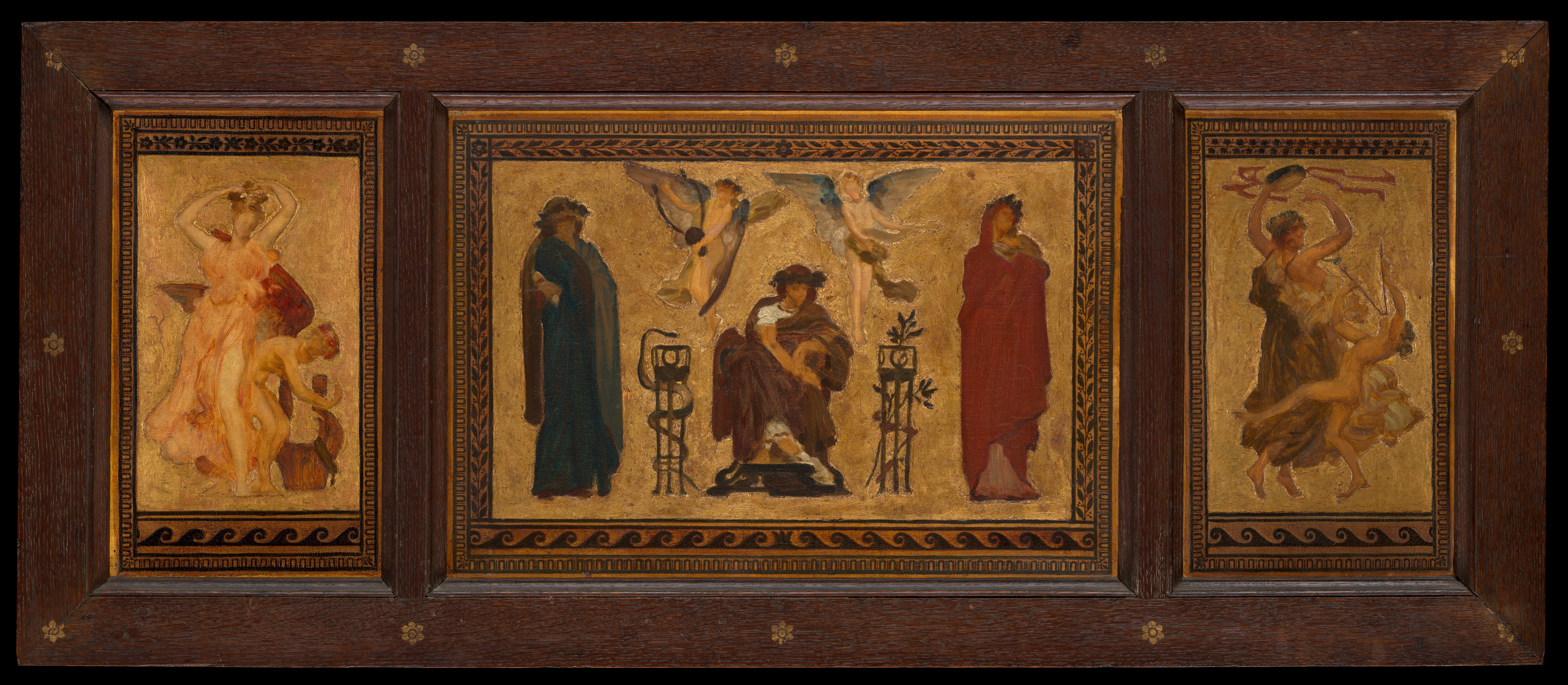
Study for the Ceiling of the Marquand Music Room by Frederic Leighton (c. 1886)

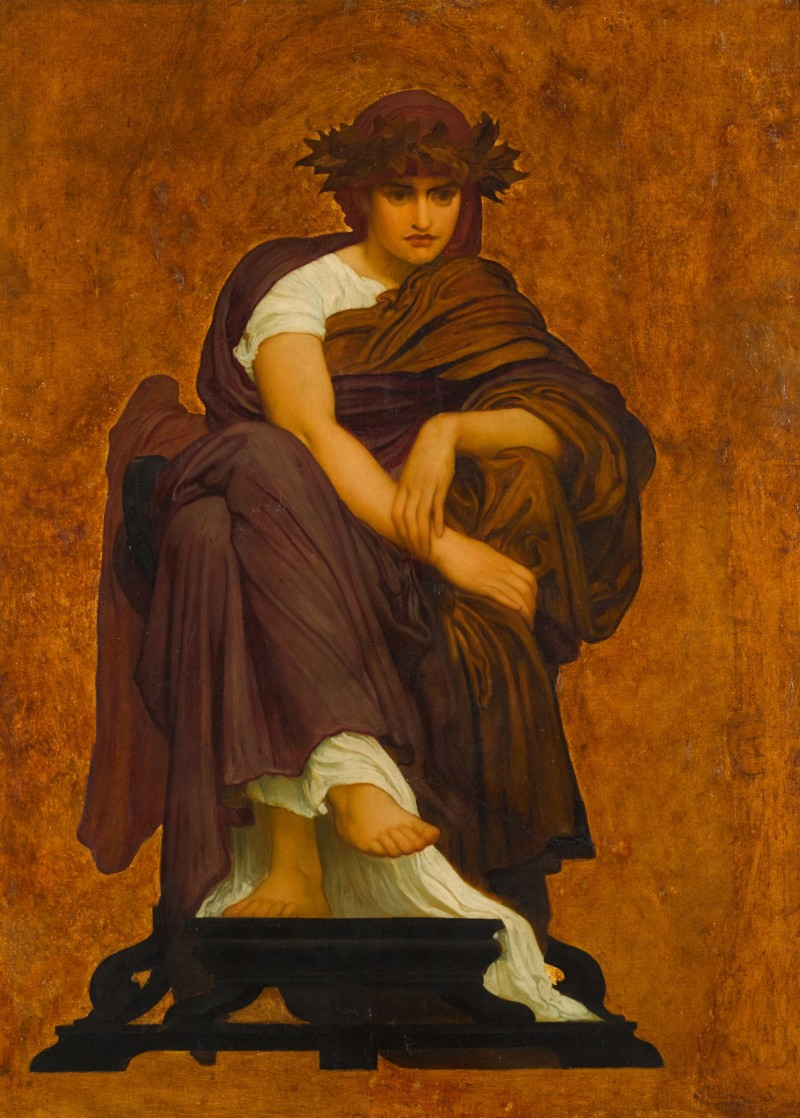
Mnemosyne, Mother of the Muses by Frederic Leighton (c. 1886)

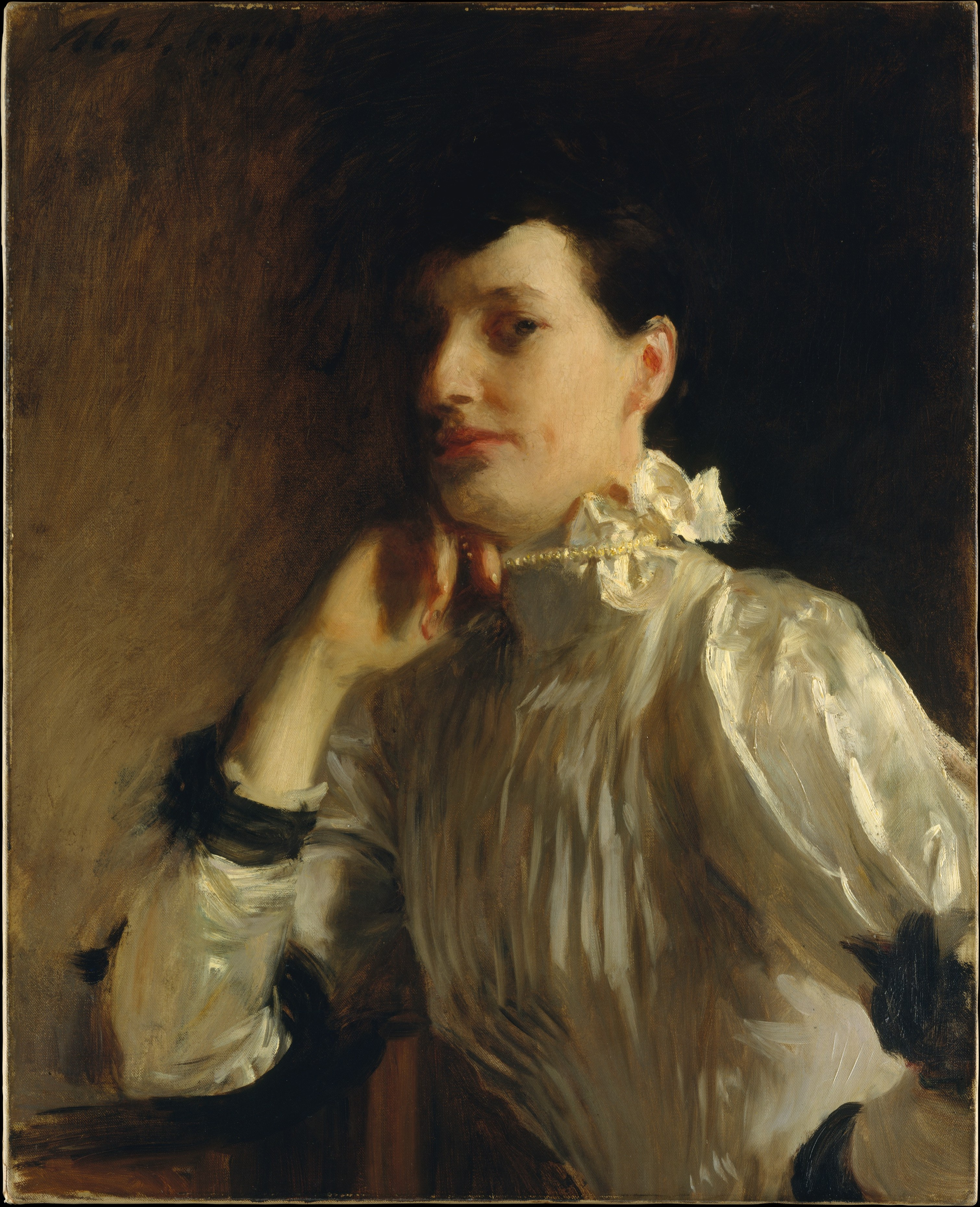
Portrait of Mabel Marquand Ward, by John Singer Sargent (c. 1891–94)

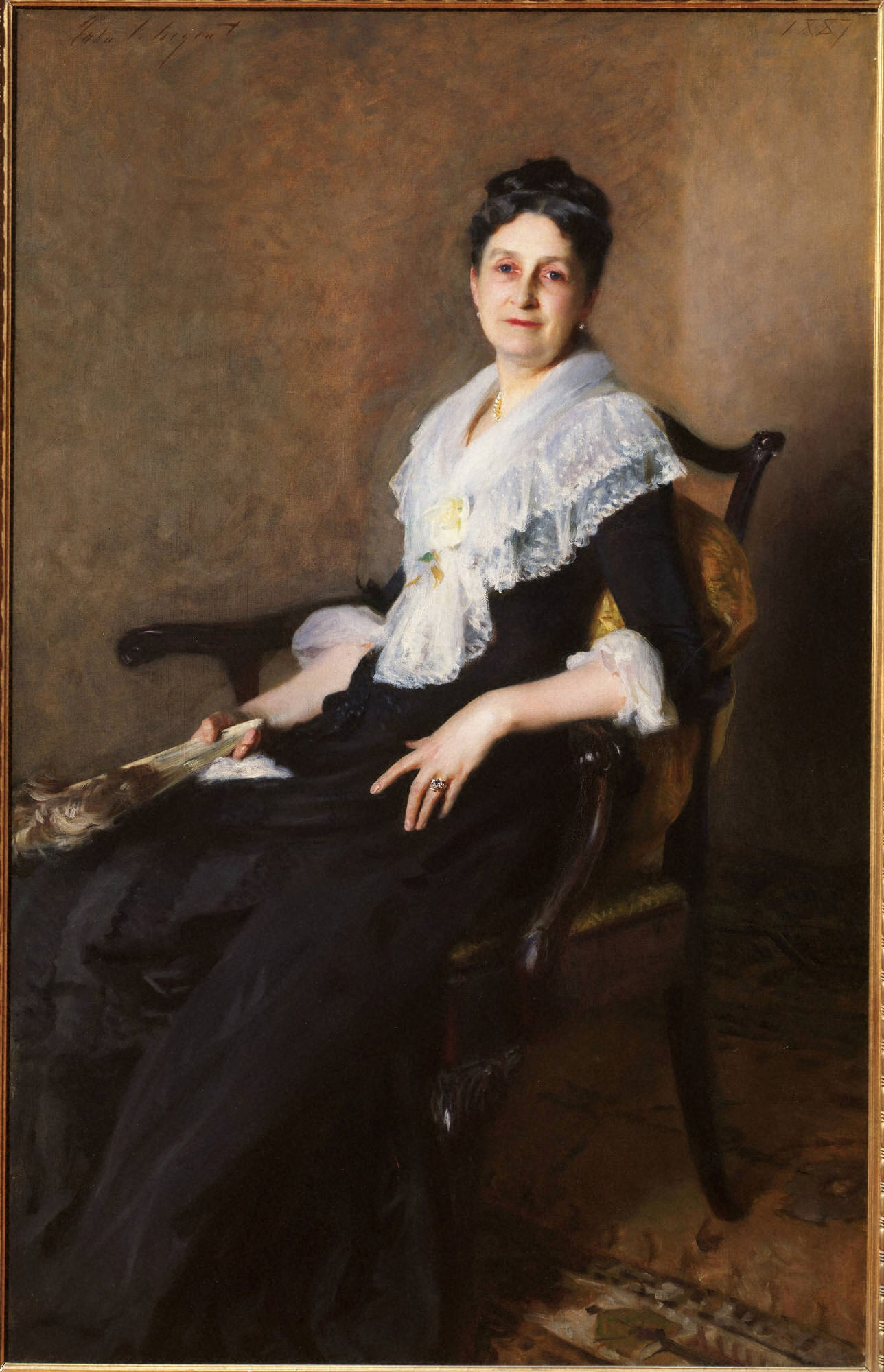
Portrait of Elizabeth Allen Marquand by John Singer Sargent (1887)

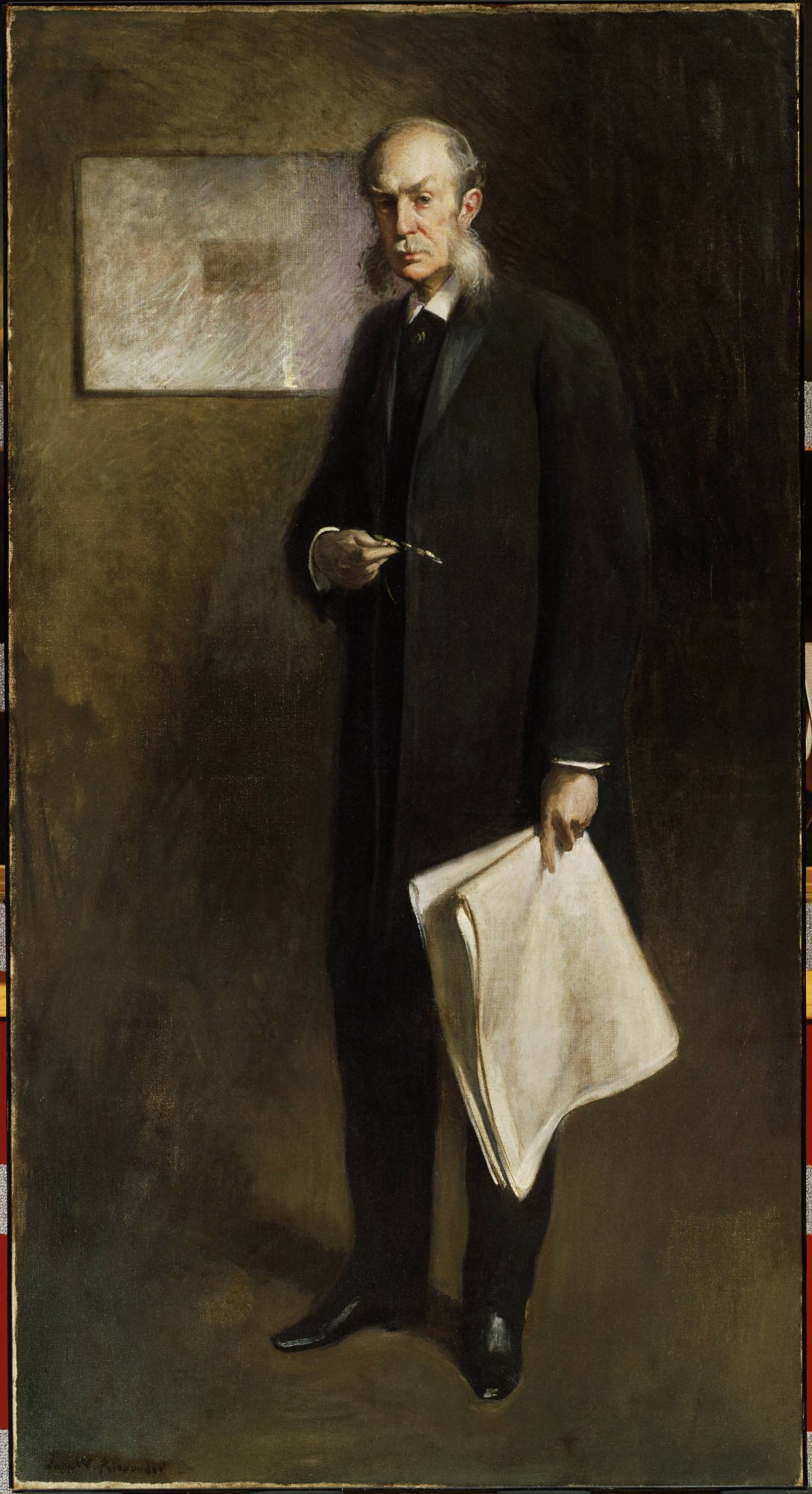
Portrait of Henry G. Marquand by John White Alexander (1896)

=== Furniture and stained glass ===
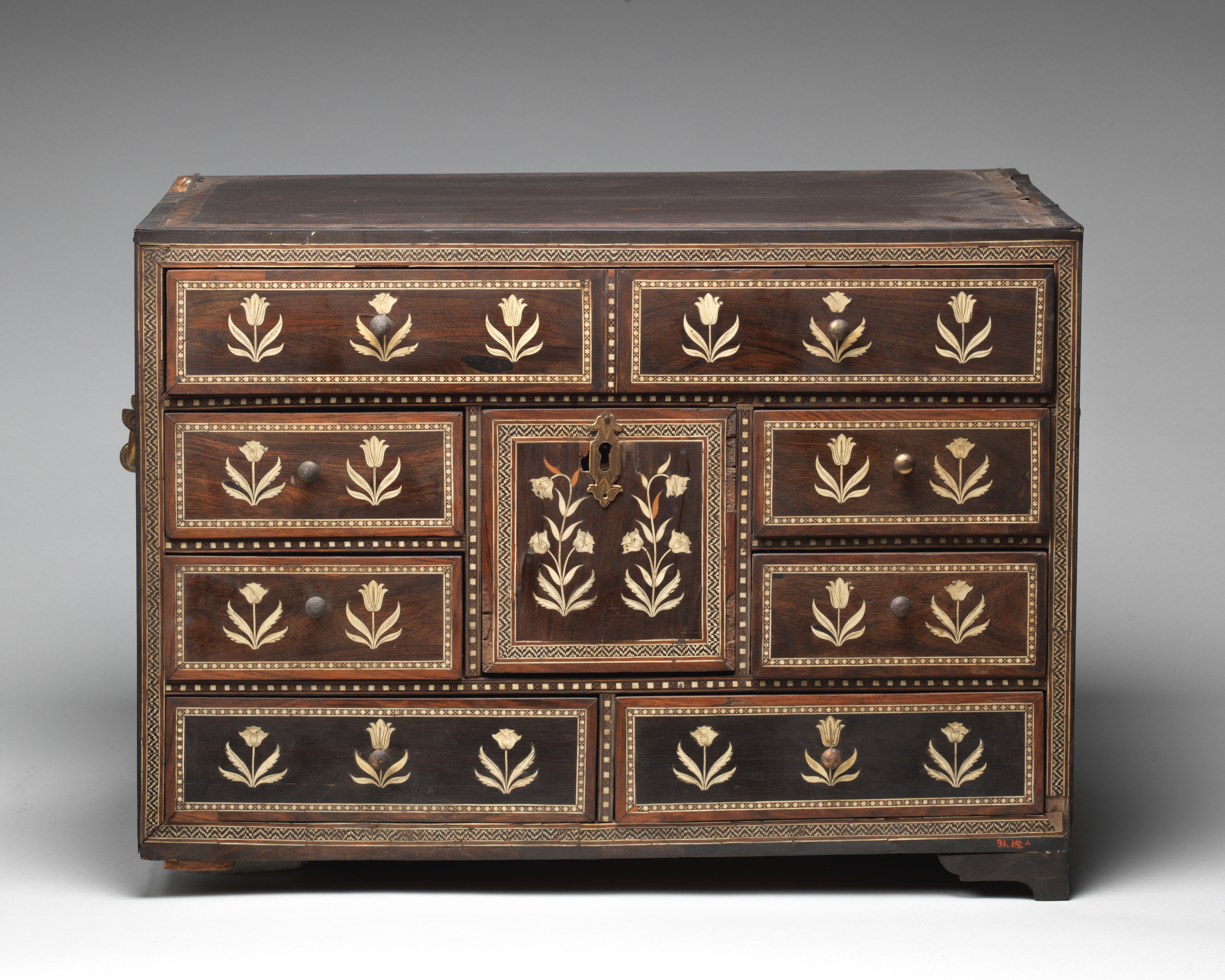
Wood and ivory cabinet (late 17th–early 18th century)

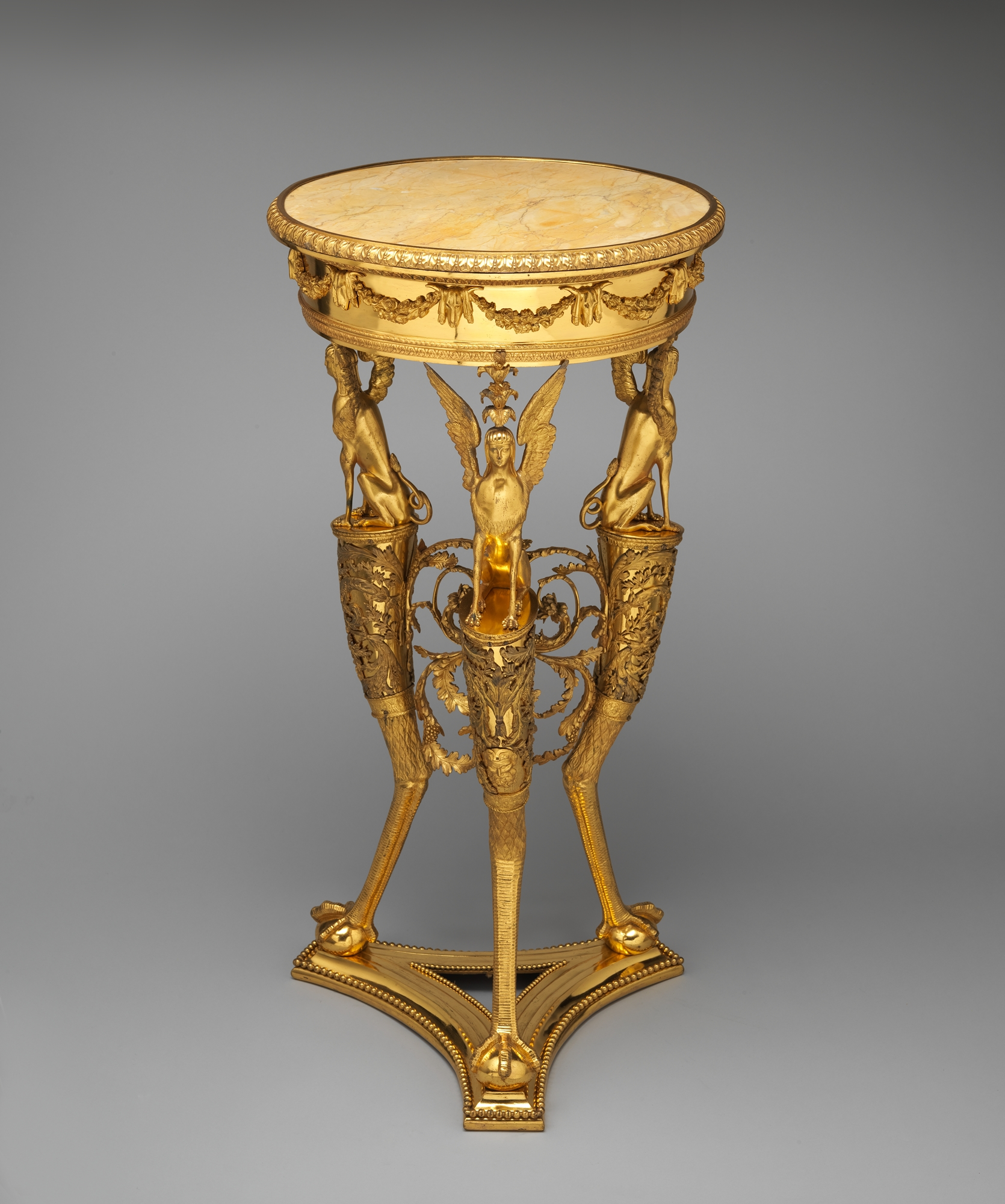
Table by Elkington & Co. (19th century, after 18th century original)

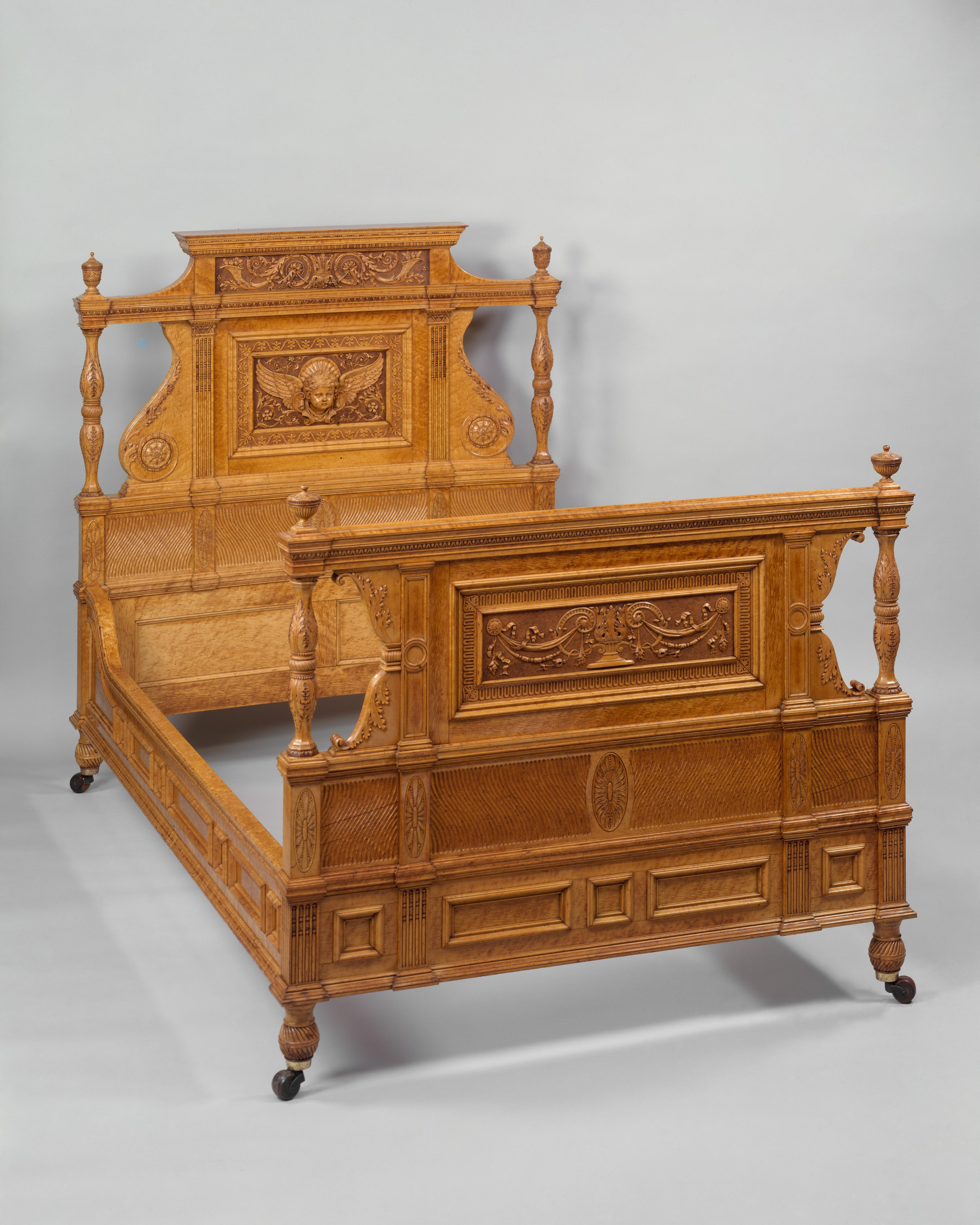
Bed from the Henry G. Marquand House in New York City (c. 1881–84)

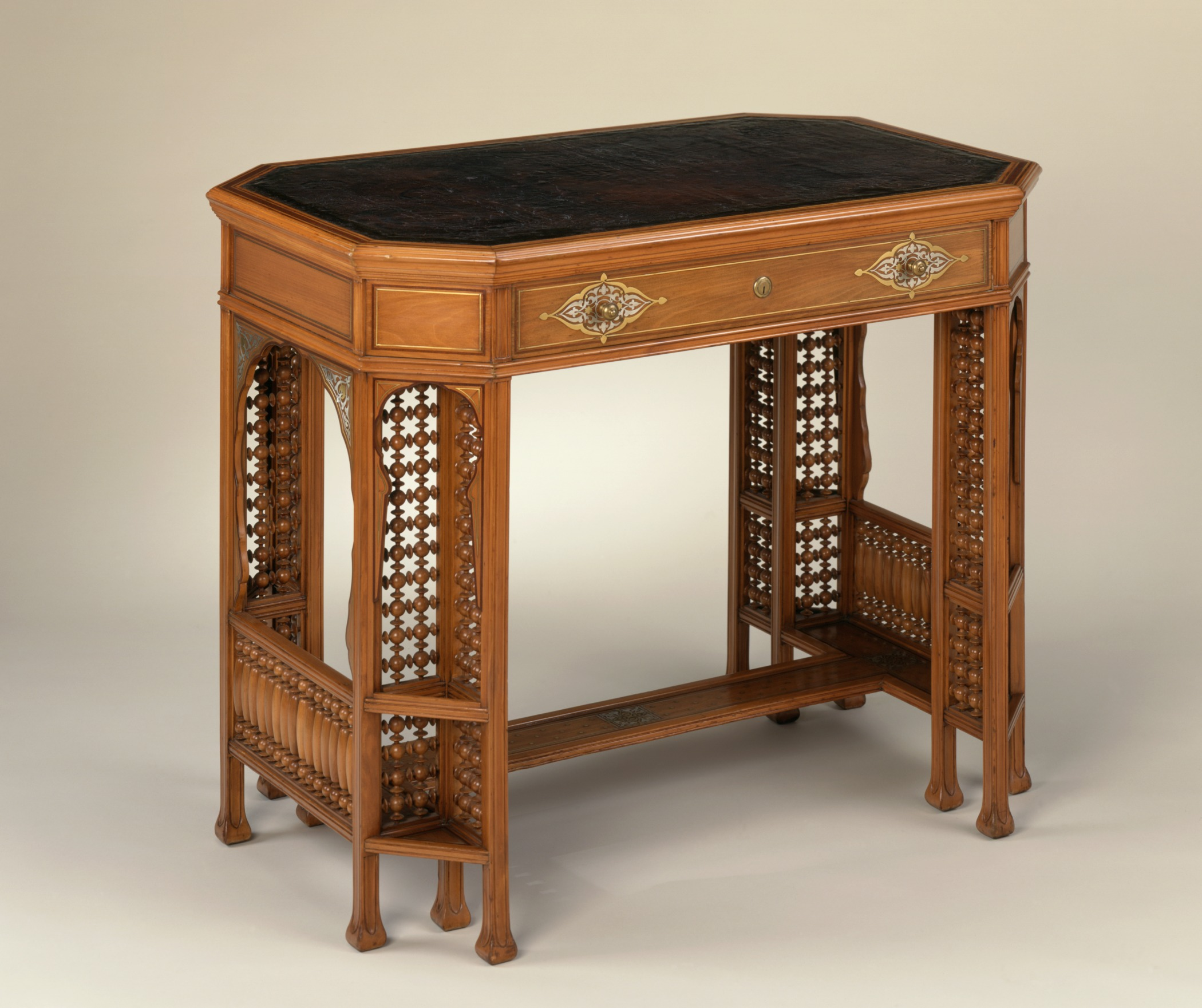
Writing table from the Marquand House by Louis Comfort Tiffany (c. 1885)

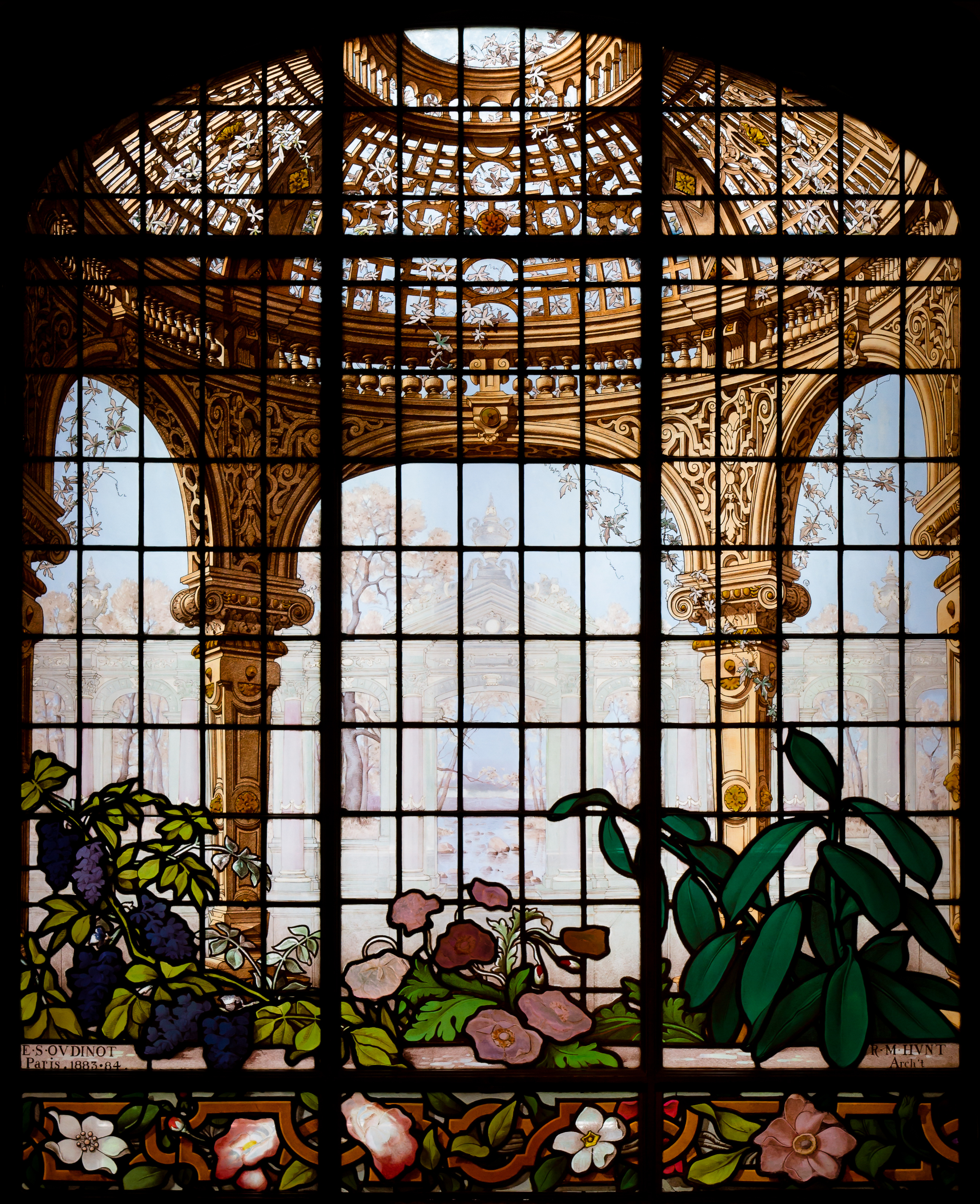
Stained glass window from the conservatory of the Marquand House, designed by Hunt and made by Eugène Stanislas Oudinot (1883-1884)

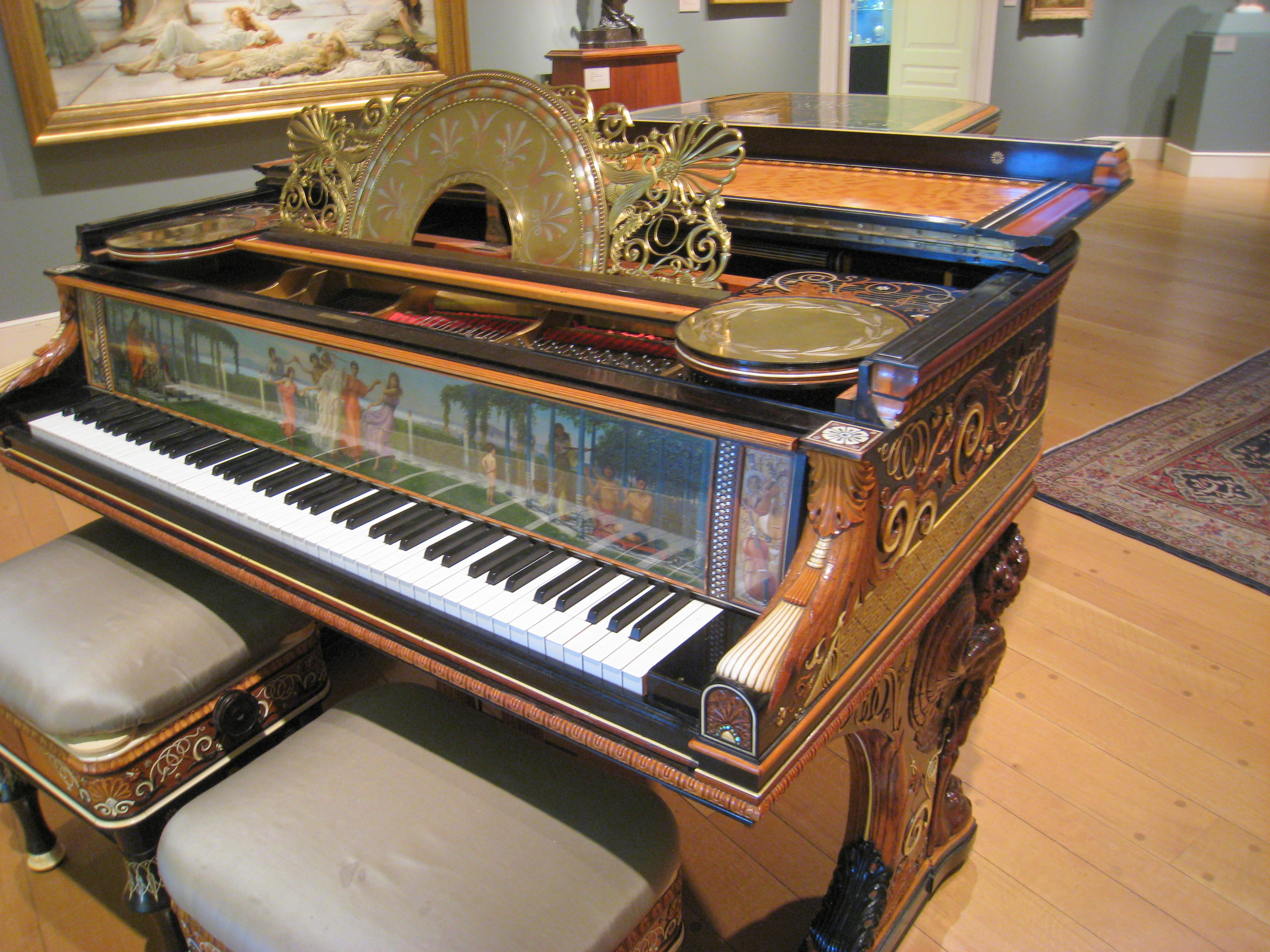
1884 Steinway grand piano designed by Sir Lawrence Alma-Tadema with painted panel by Sir Edward Poynter (Note: The original Steinway grand piano cost $1,200 when sold it to Marquand. Then it was shipped to London and decorated by Sir Lawrence Alma-Tadema with painted panel by Sir Edward Poynter, all at a cost of $40,000. In 1888, it was referred to as the "highest-priced piano in America." During the 1903 auction of the collection, it was sold for $8,000 and, later, acquired by vaudeville theatre owner and manager Martin Beck. Later, the Beck's moved the piano from their East Side residence to the Martin Beck Theatre (today the Al Hirschfeld Theatre) on West 45th Street. In 1980, after fifty years in the upstairs lounge, the piano was sold at auction for $390,000 which, at the time, was "the highest price ever paid for a musical instrument or for any piece of 19th century furniture.")

=== Sculptures ===
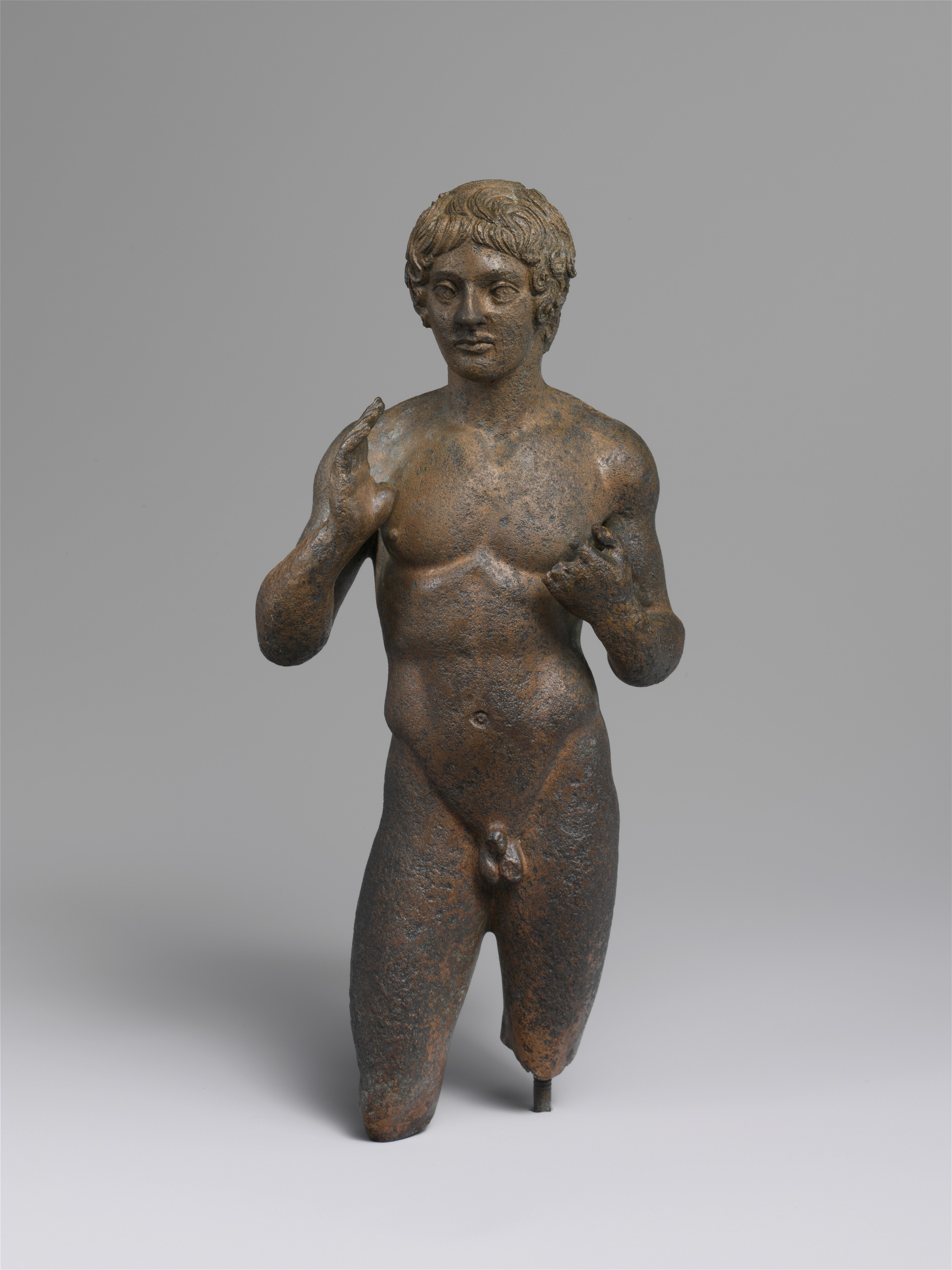
Bronze statuette of a youth (late 5th century B.C.)

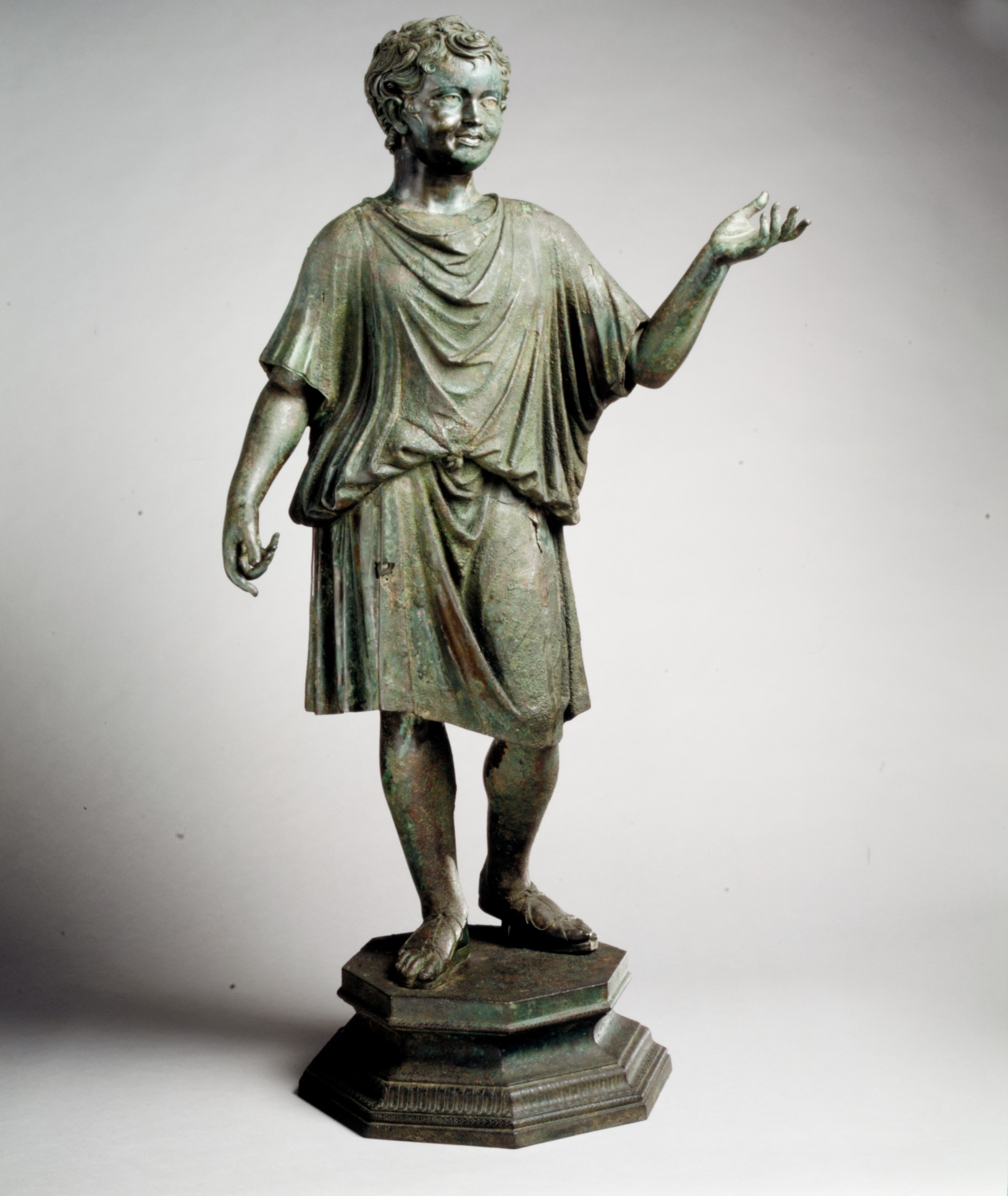
Bronze statue of a camillus (acolyte) (ca. A.D. 14–54)

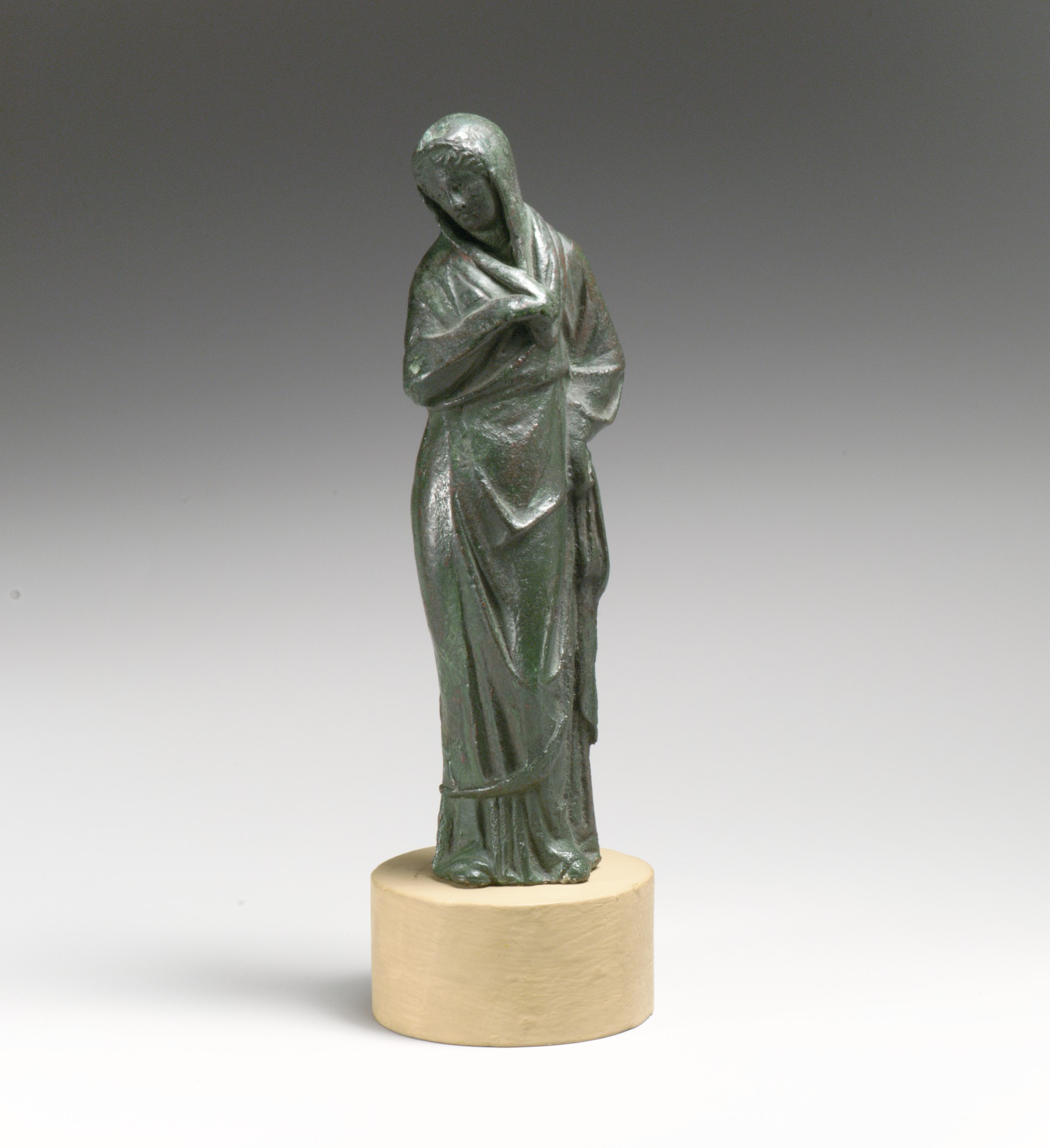
Statuette of a woman

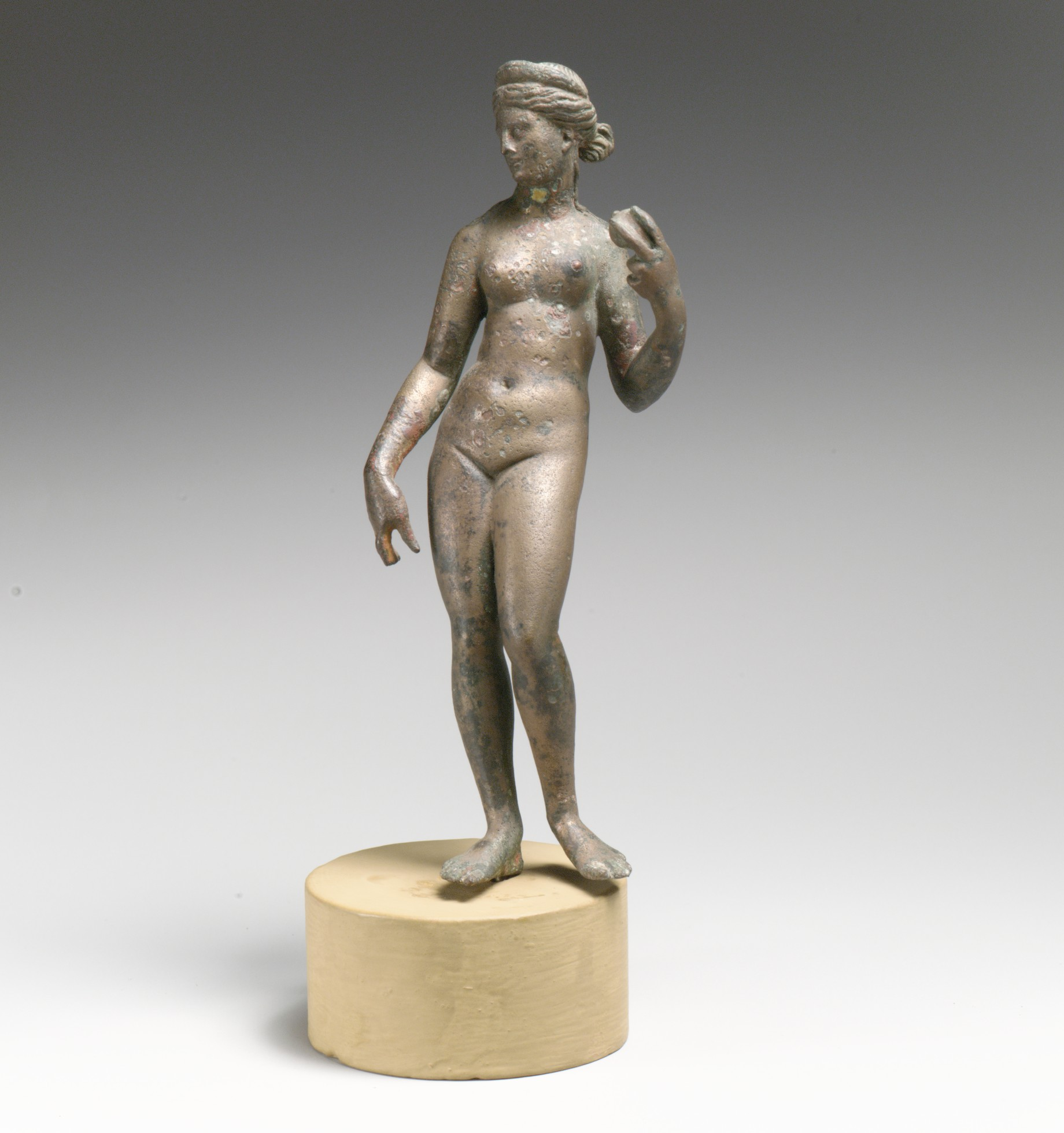
Statuette of Aphrodite with apple

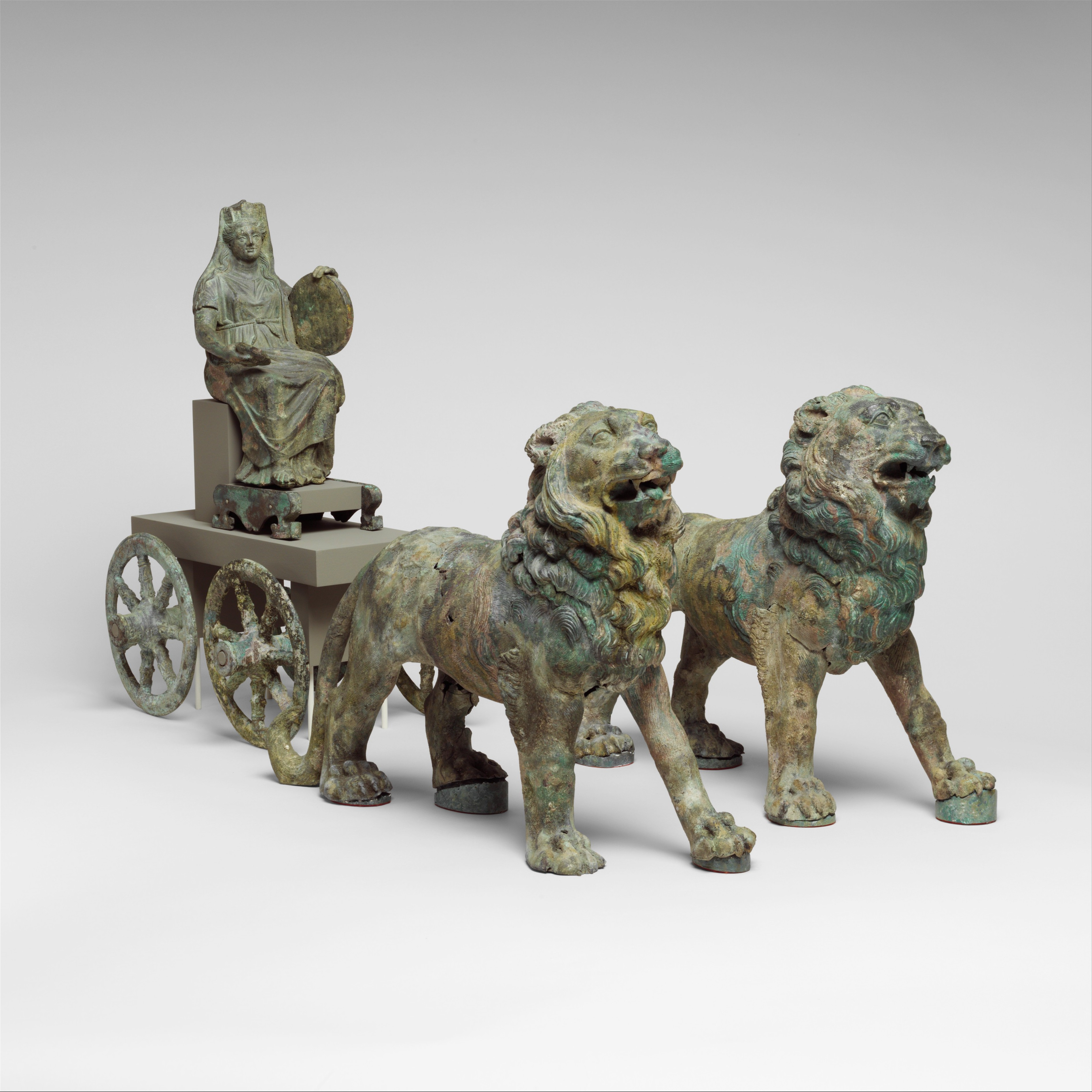
Bronze statuette of Cybele on a cart drawn by lions (2nd half of 2nd century A.D.)

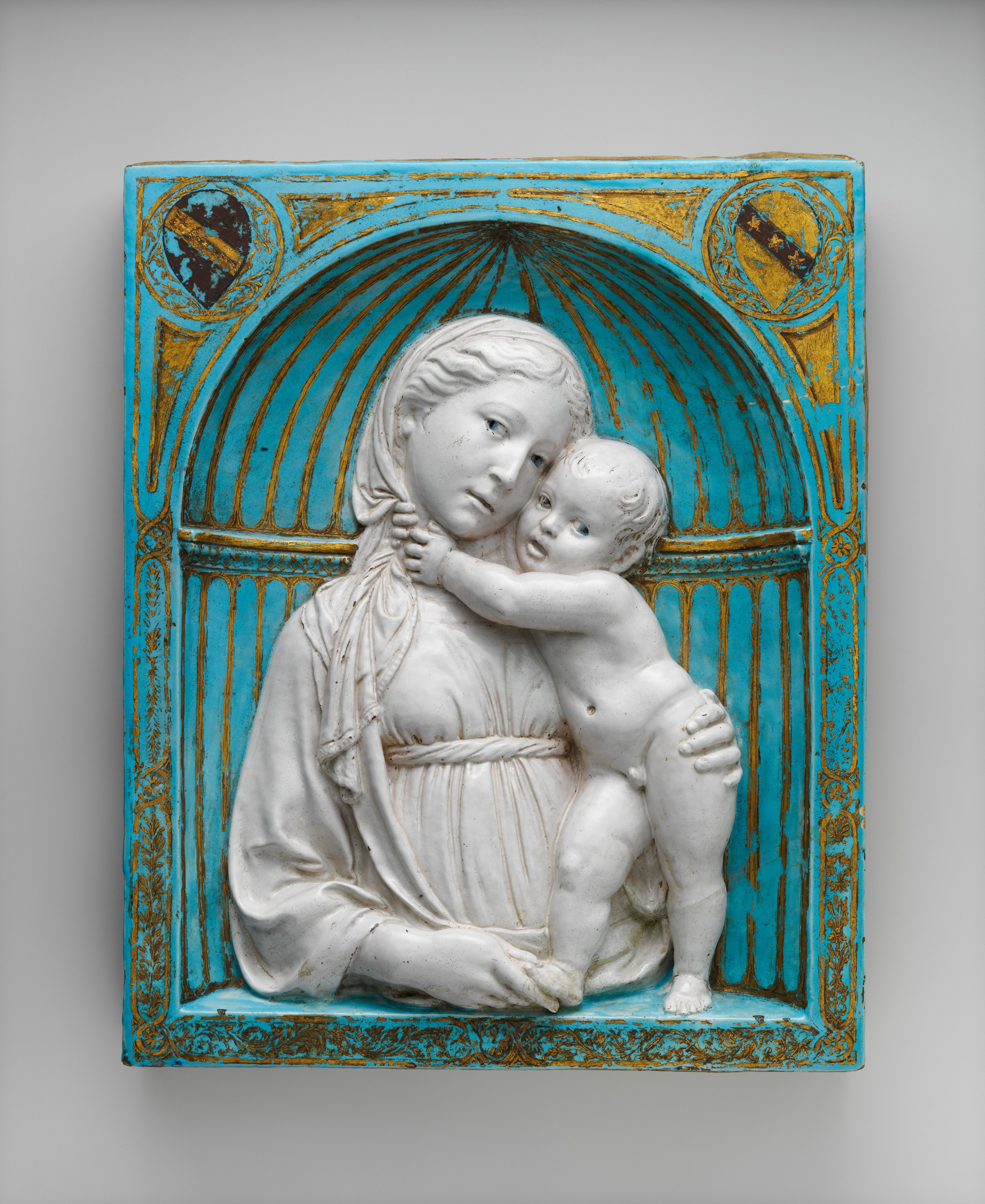
Virgin and Child in a niche by Luca della Robbia (c. 1460)

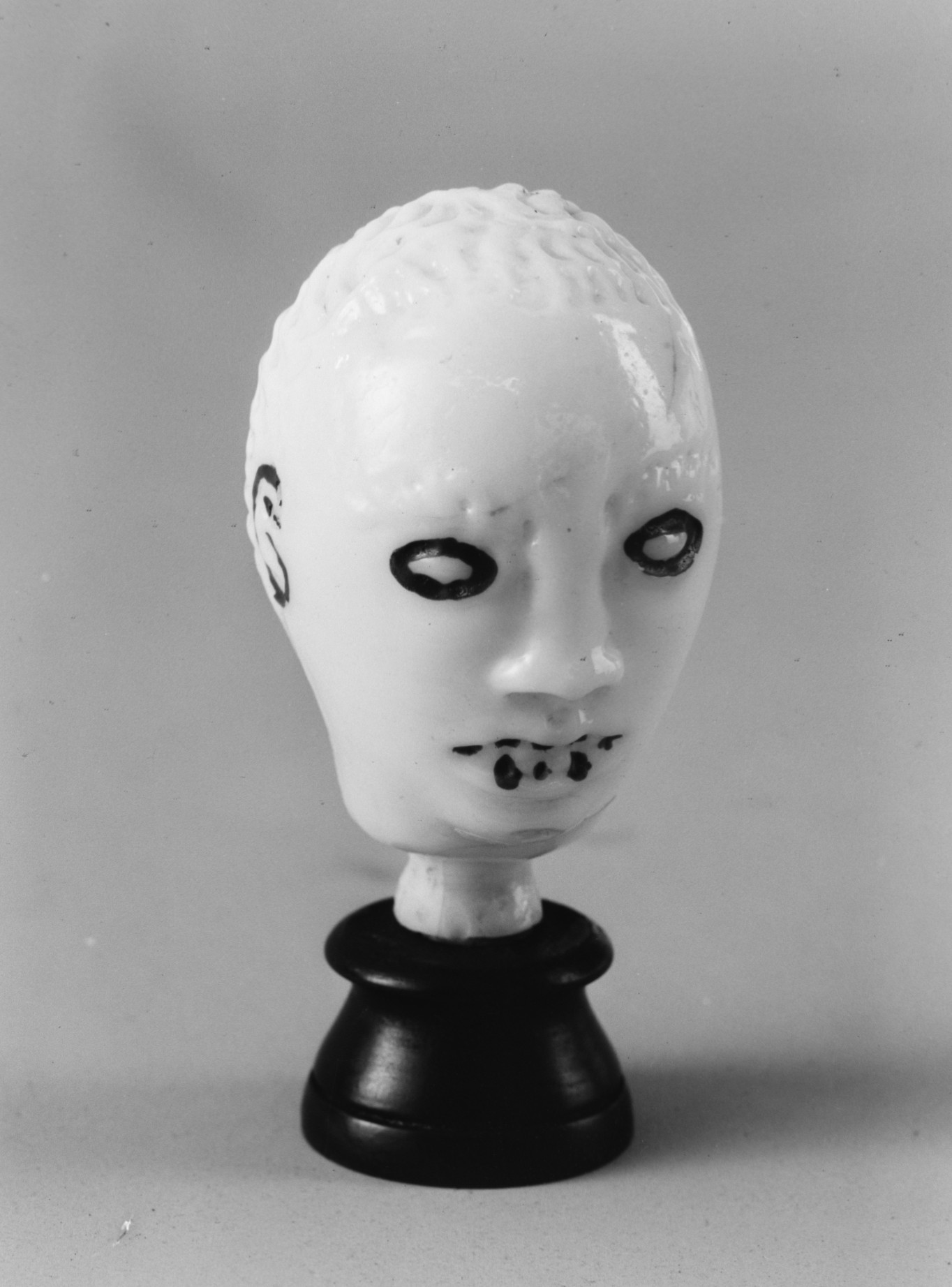
Head-shaped flacon Glasshouse of Bernard Perrot, Verrerie Royale d'Orléans (c. 1700)

=== Decorative arts ===
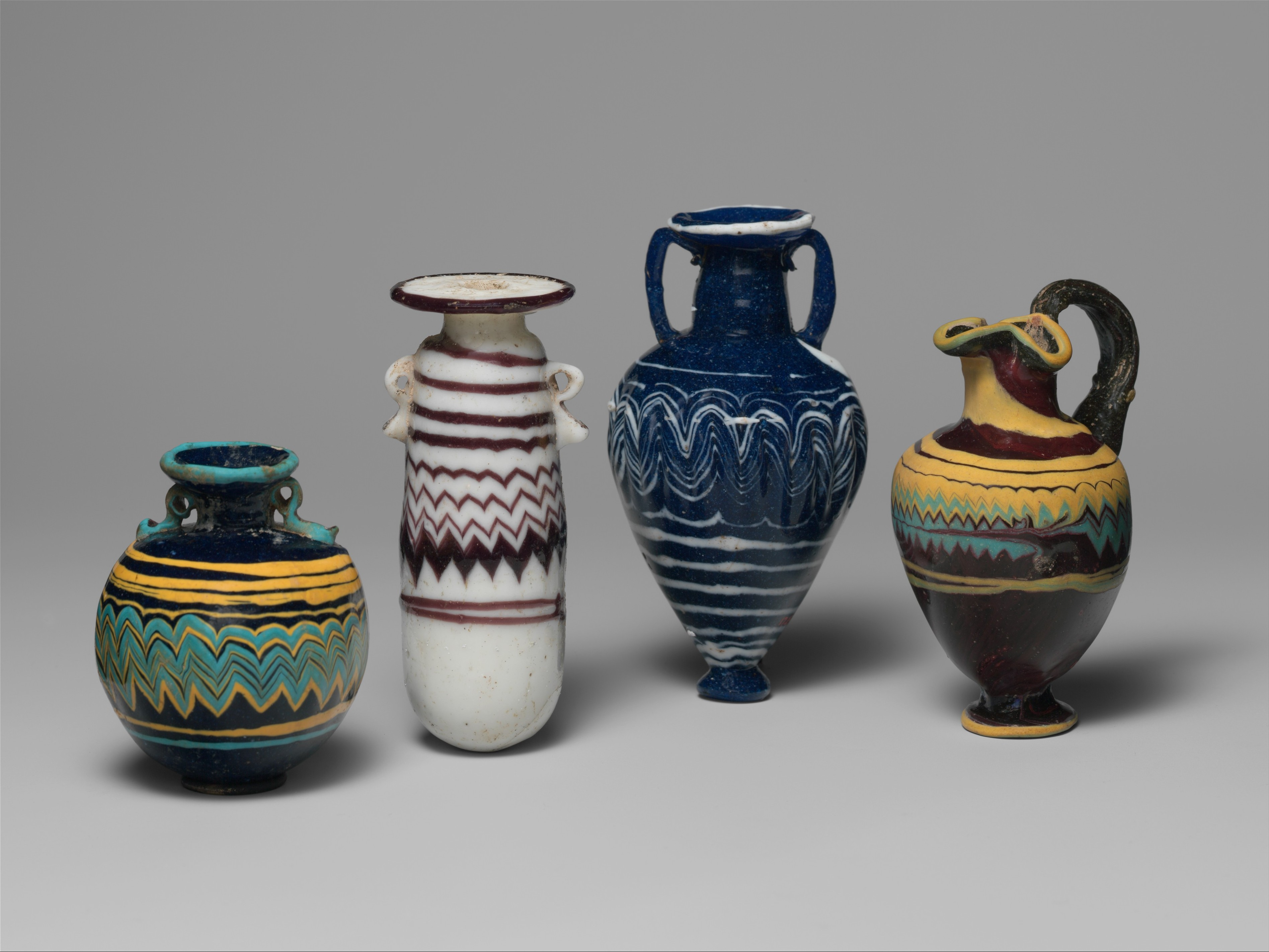
Glass alabastron (perfume bottle) (late 6th–5th century B.C.)

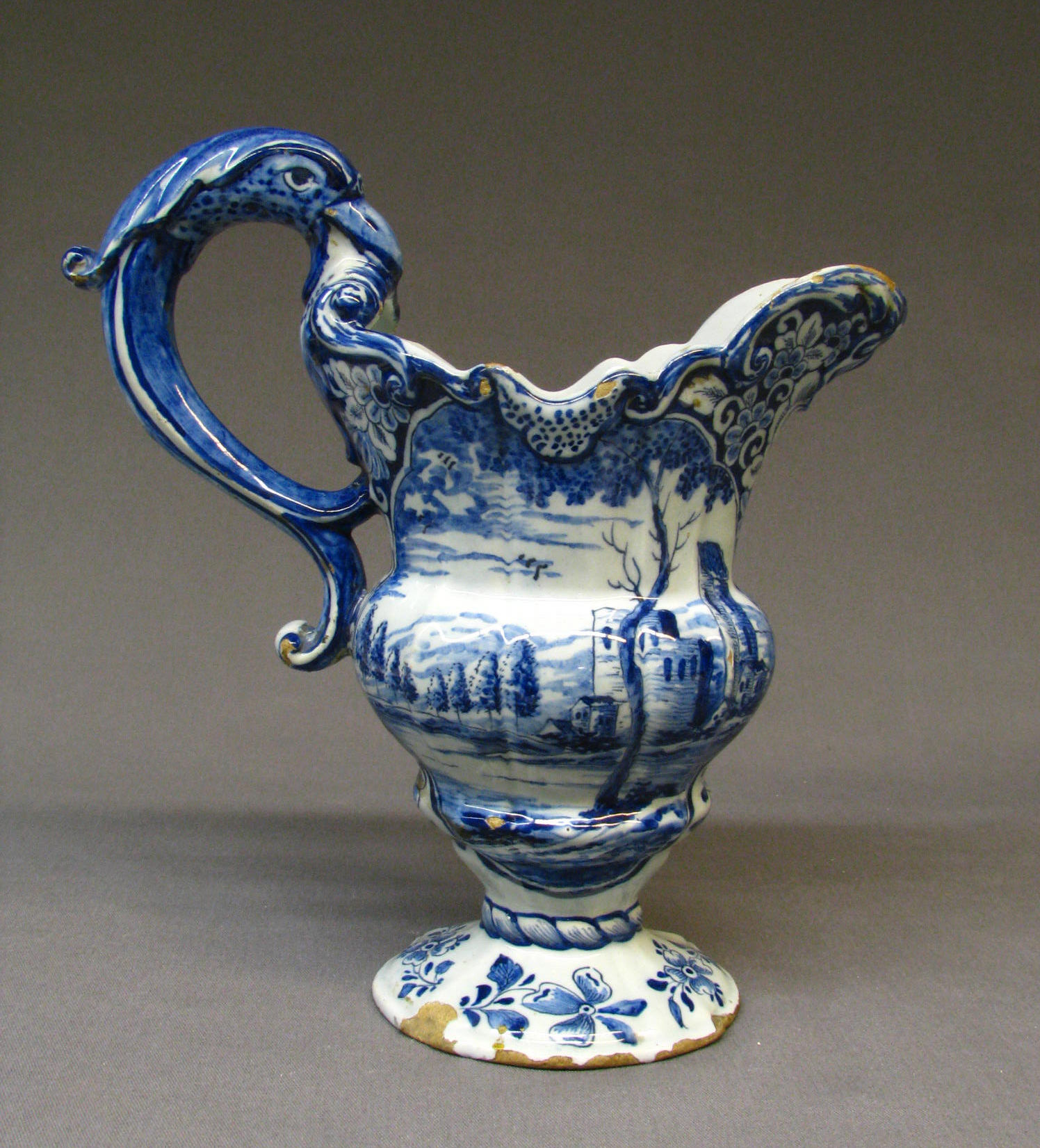
Ewer, Delft (c. 1710–60)

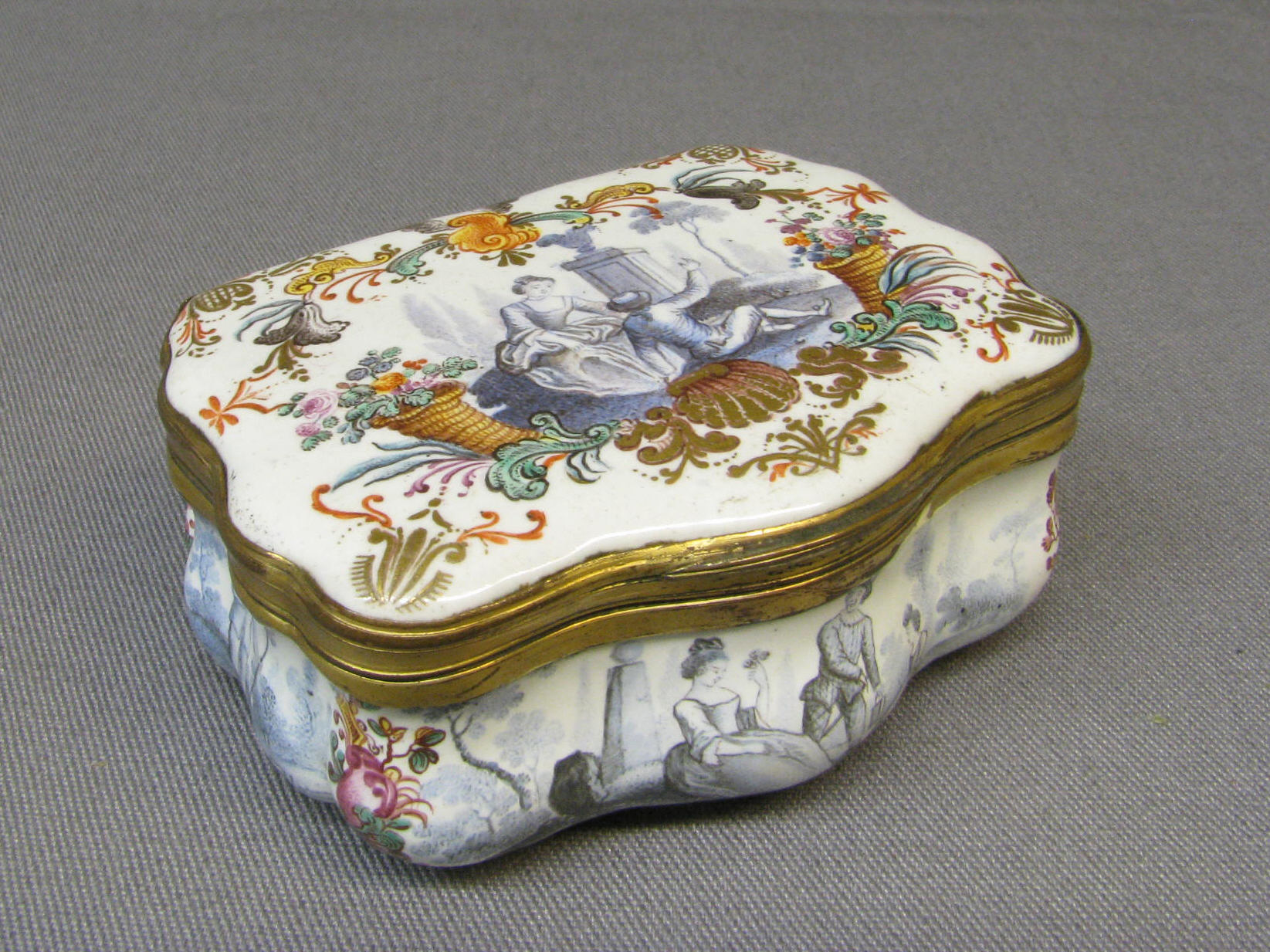
Snuffbox (mid-18th century)

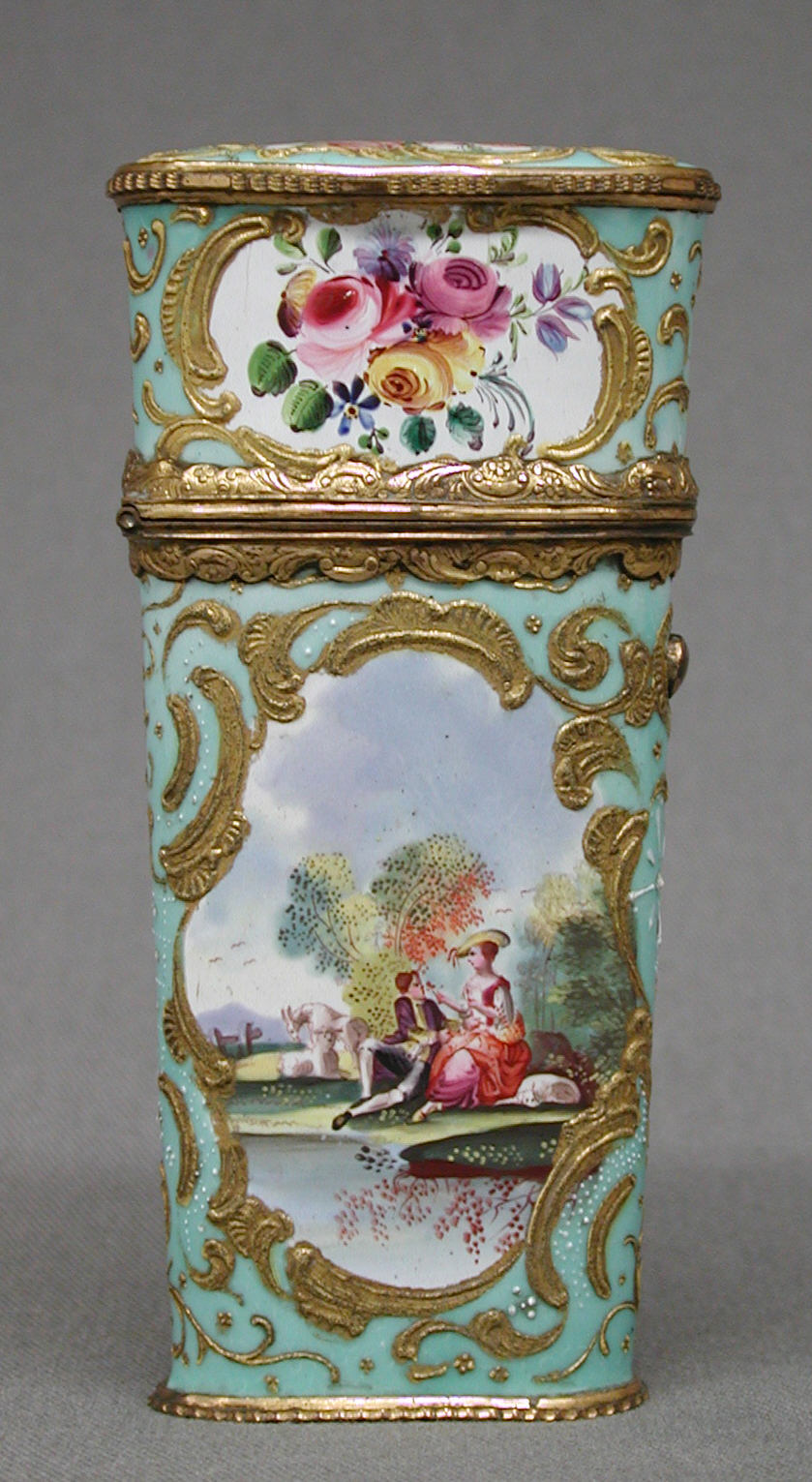
Nécessaire (c. 1760–80)

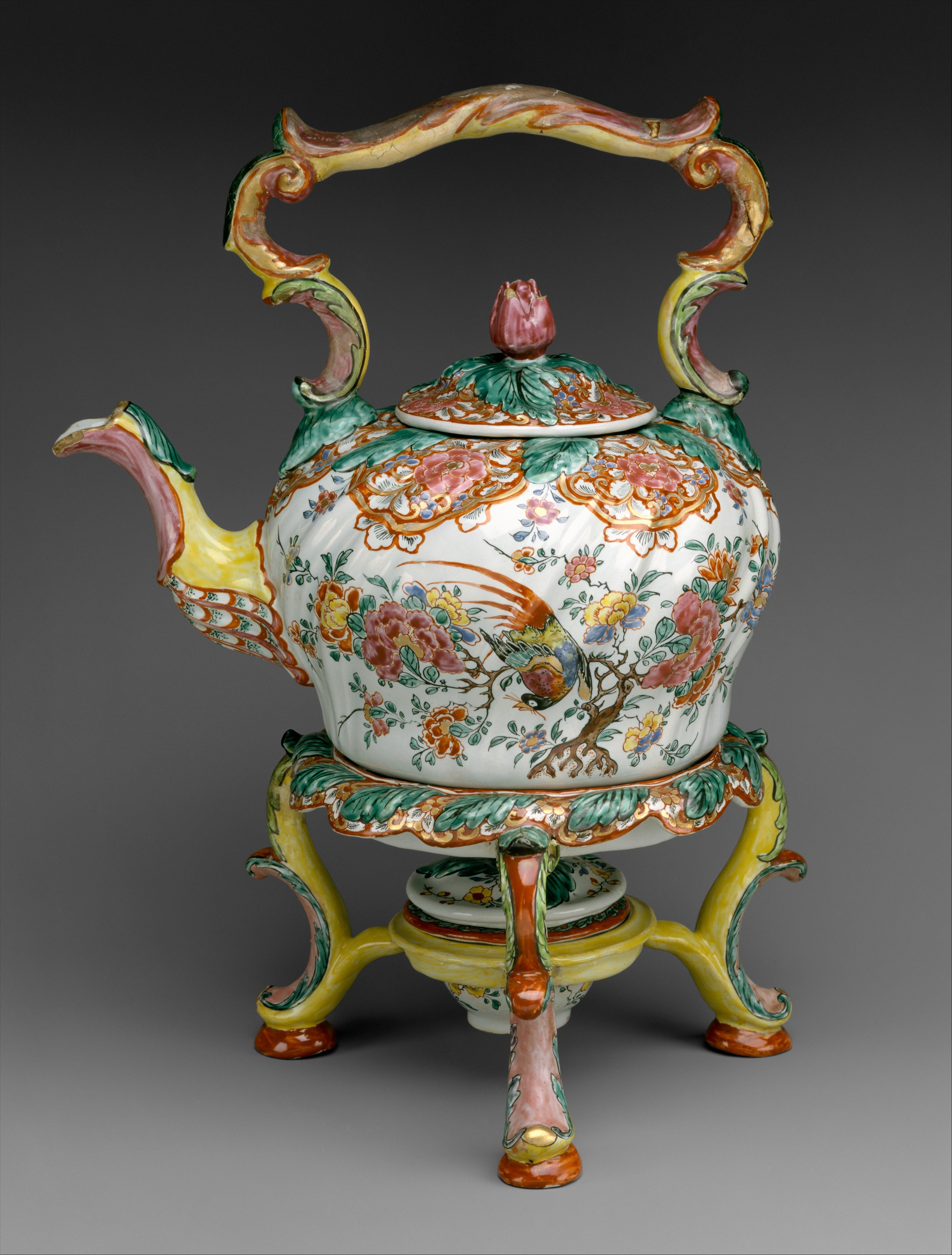
Chocolate pot with cover, Delft (1761–69)

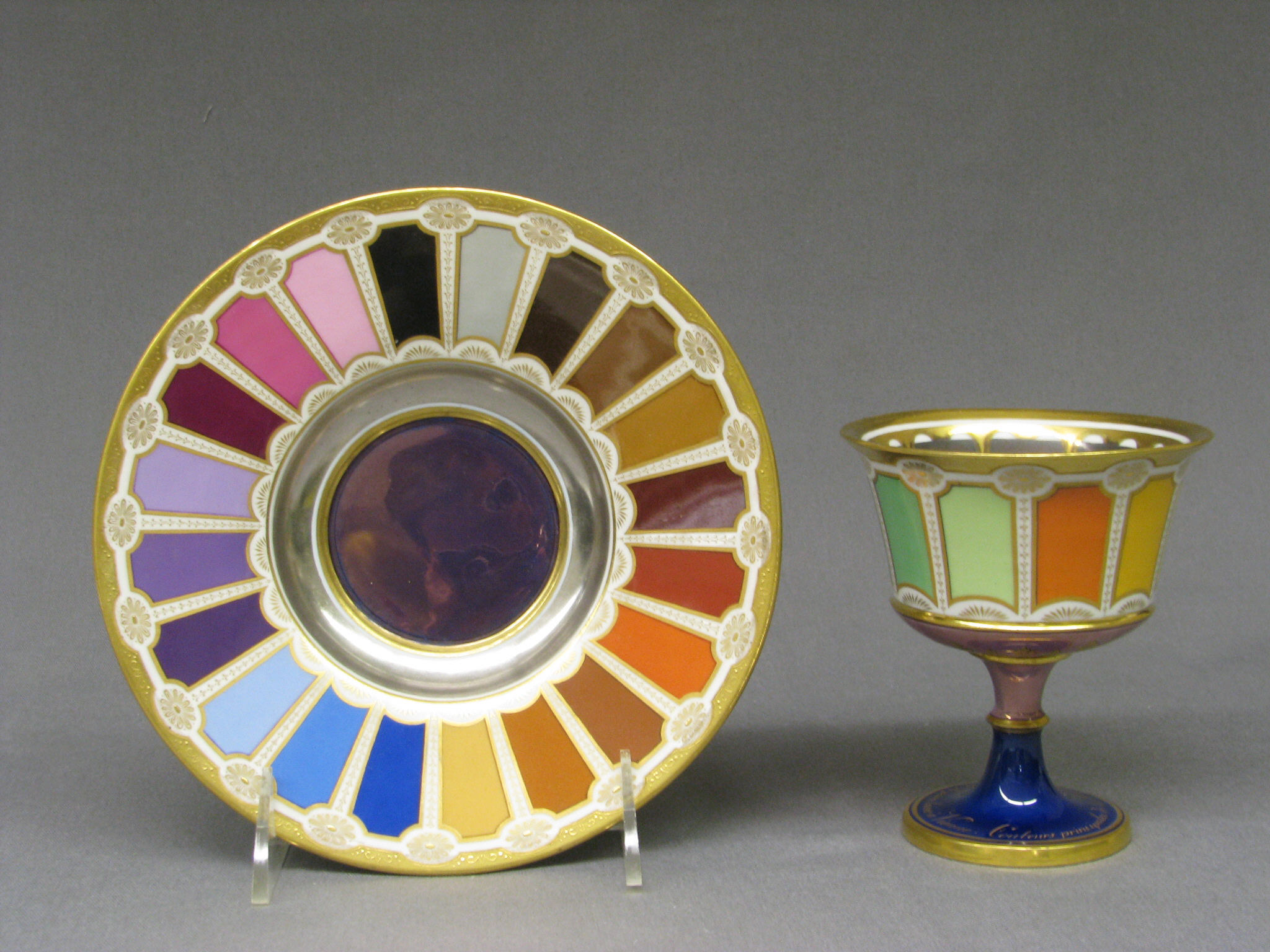
Goblet and saucer Imperial Porcelain Manufactory (1804)

=== Illustrated Catalogue (1903) ===
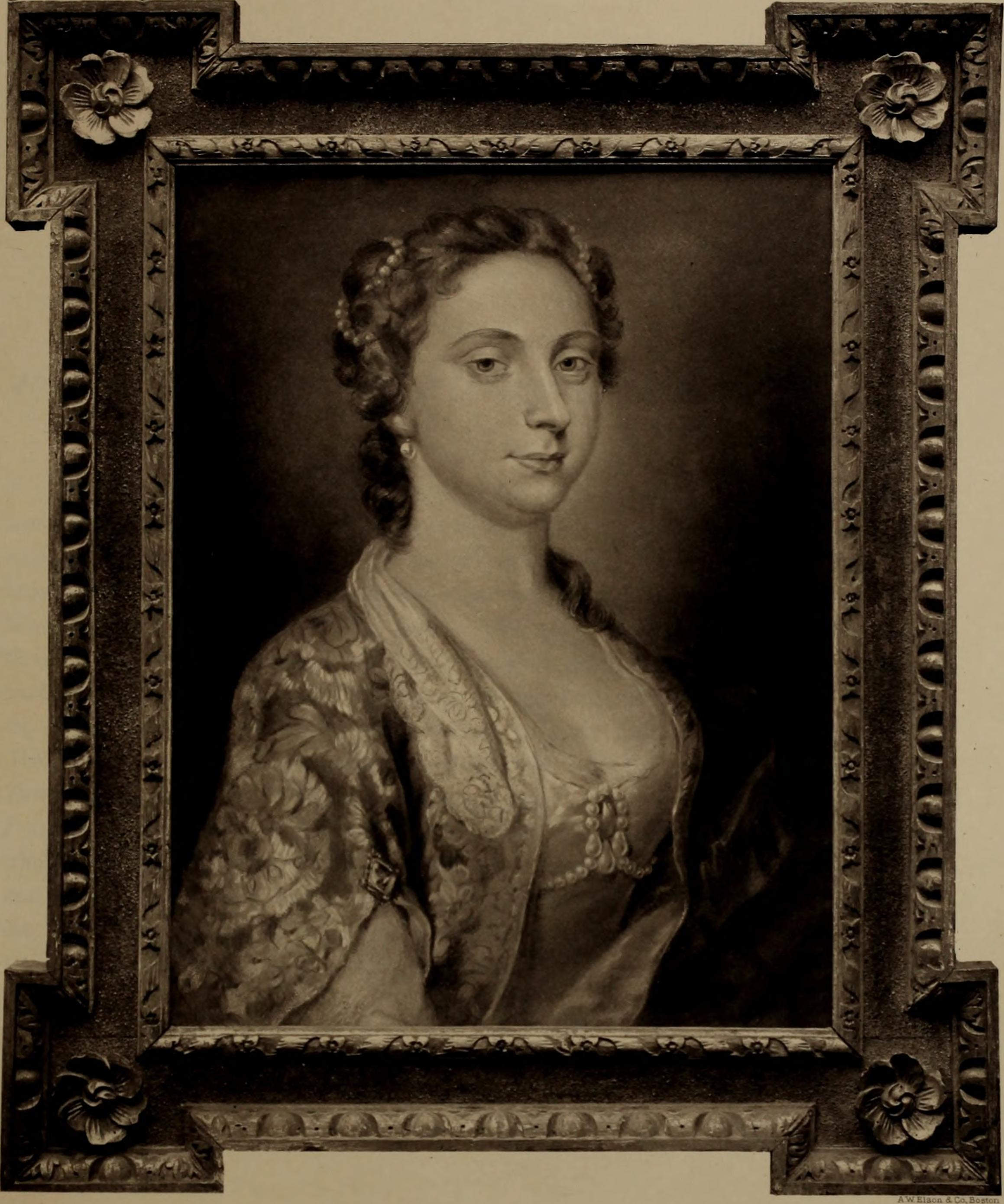
Portrait of Peg Woffington by John Russell

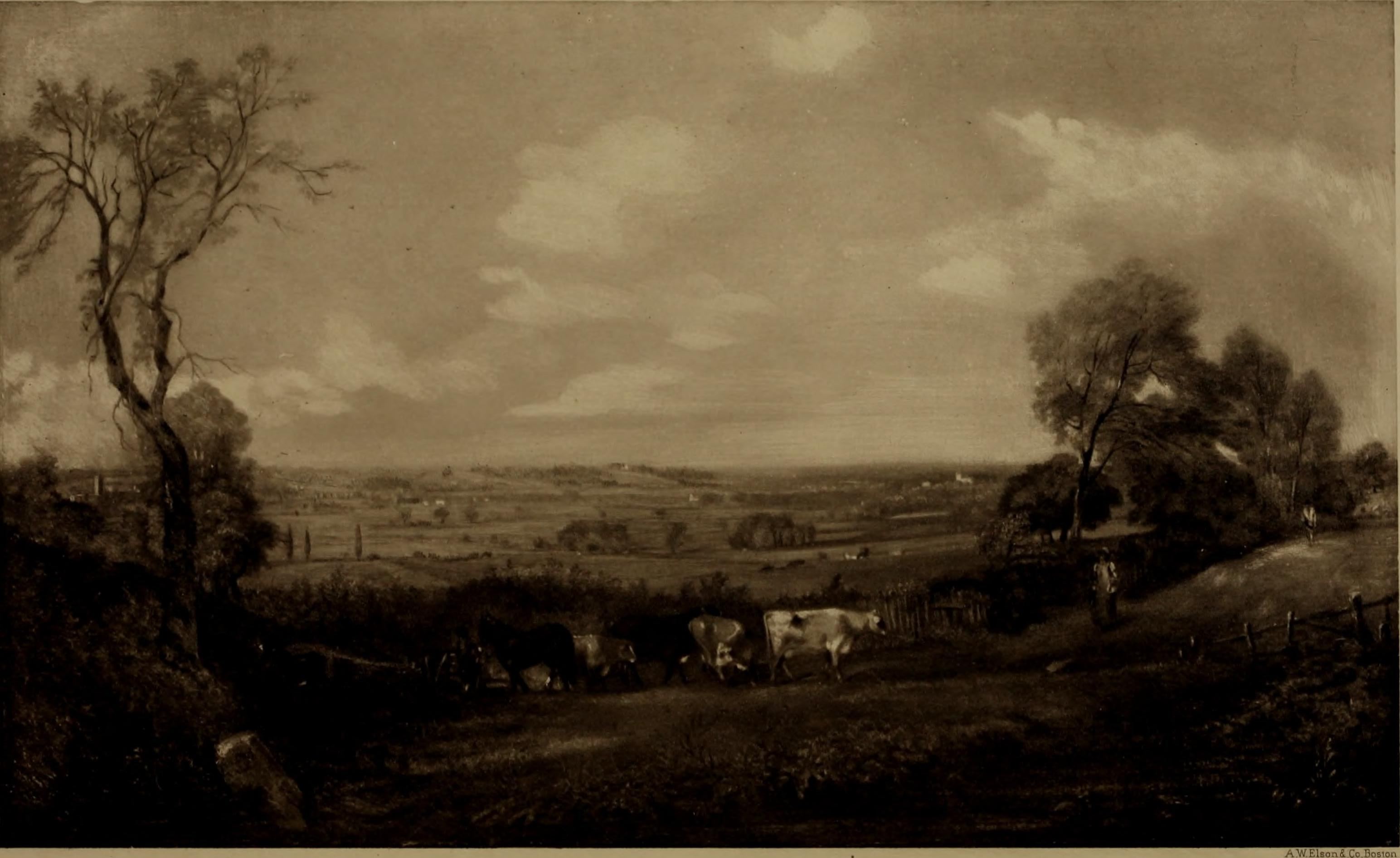
Painting of Dedham Vale by John Constable (1811)

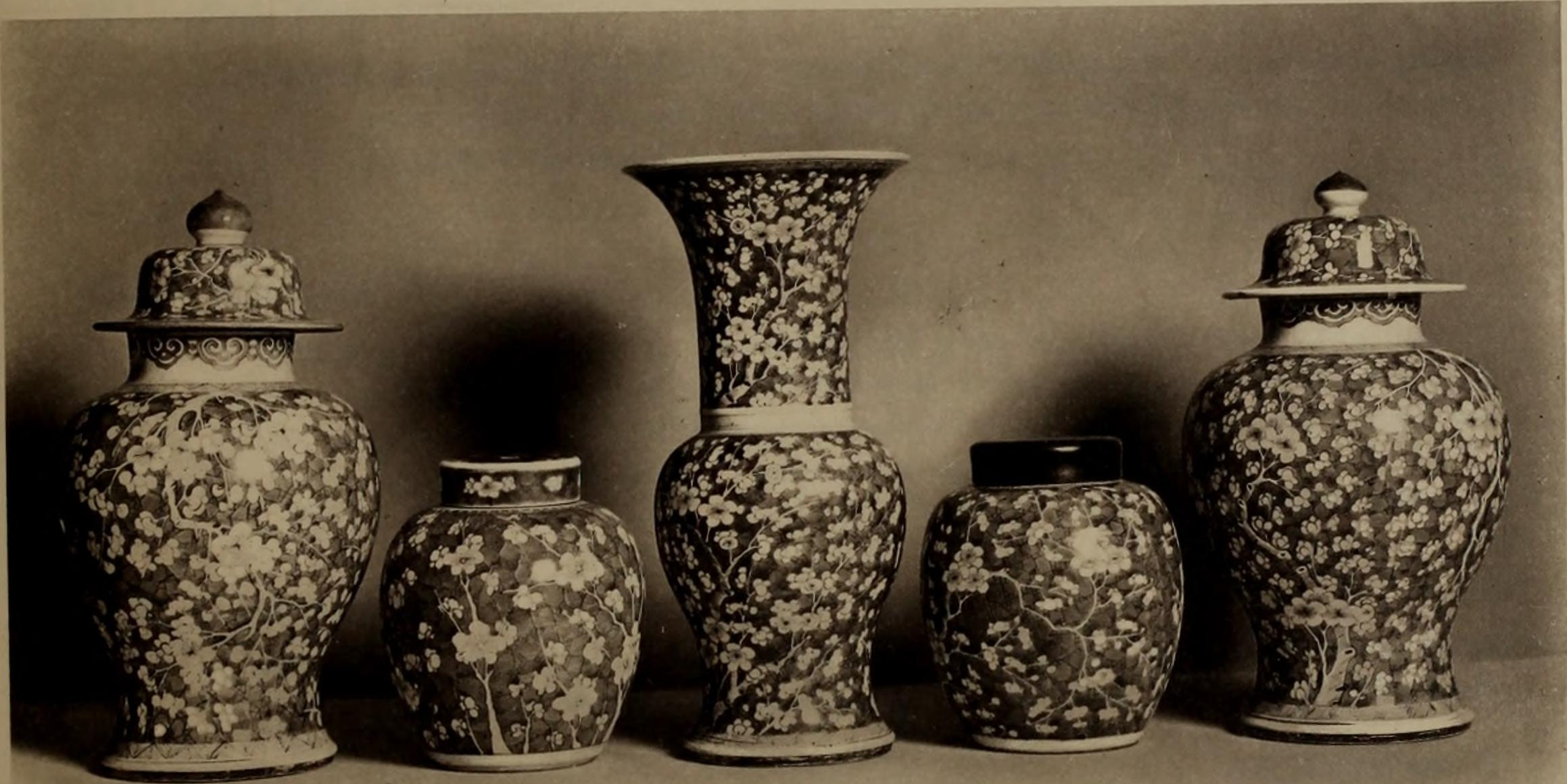

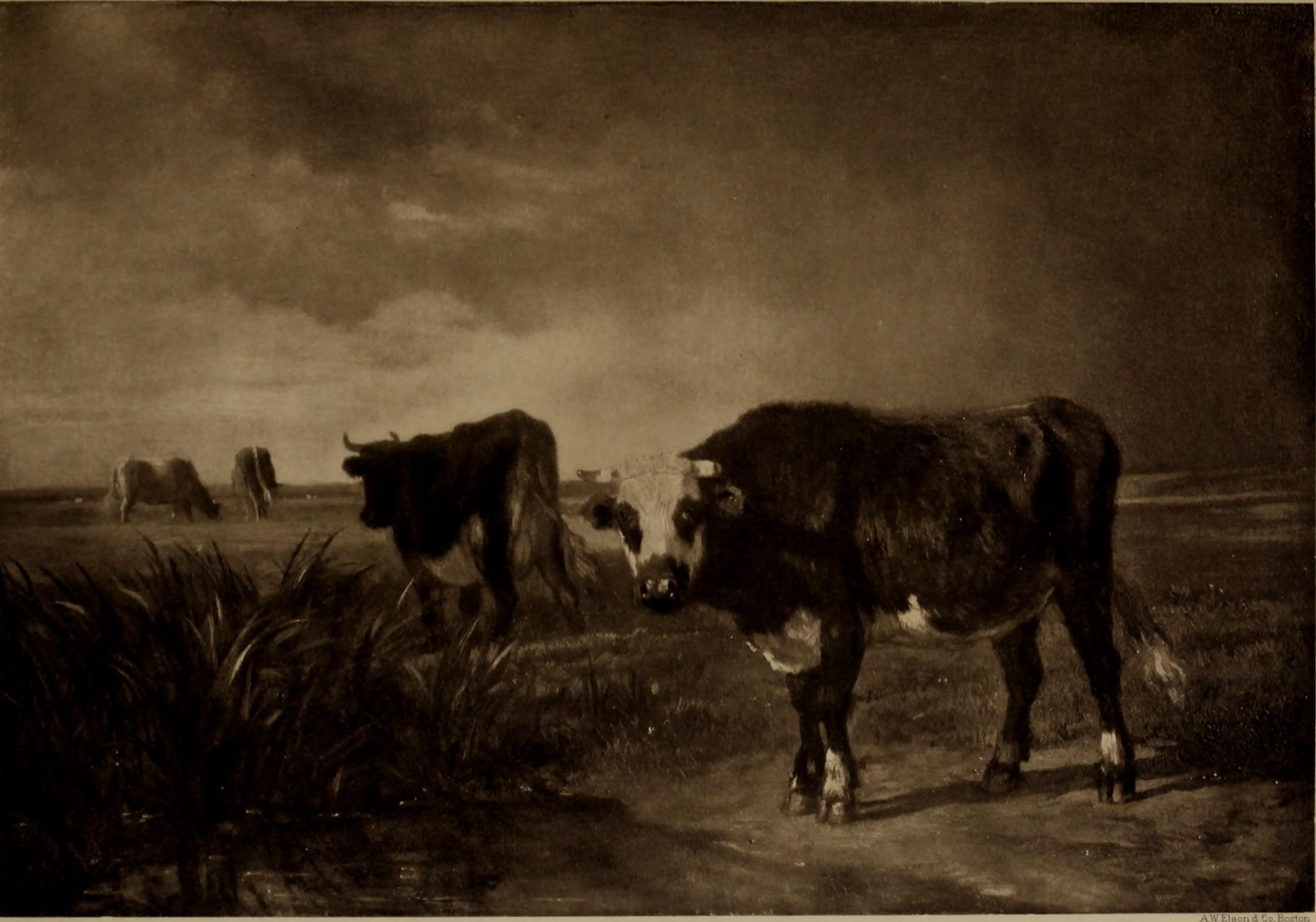
Landscape and cattle by Constant Troyon

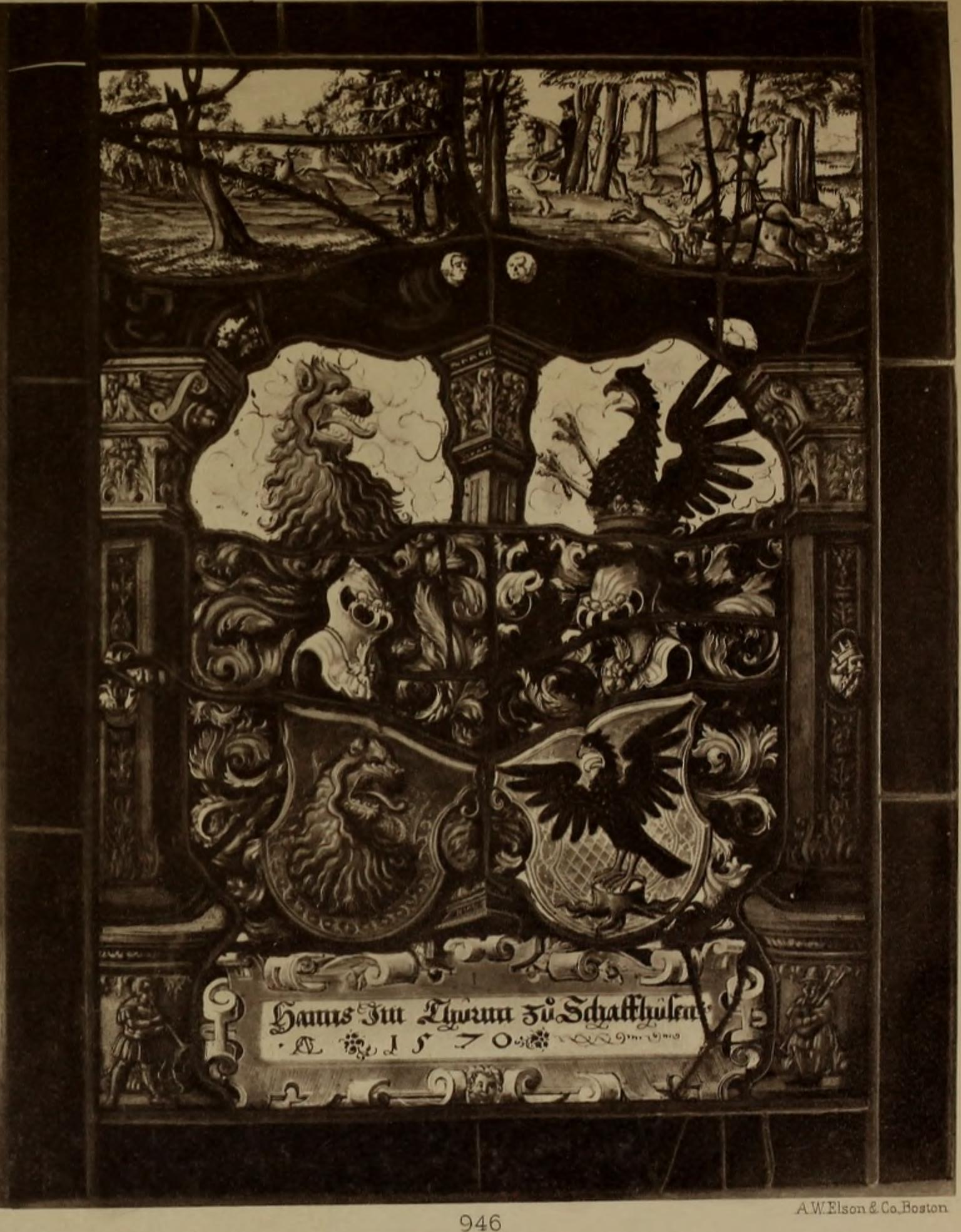
Panel of painted and leaded glass (1570)

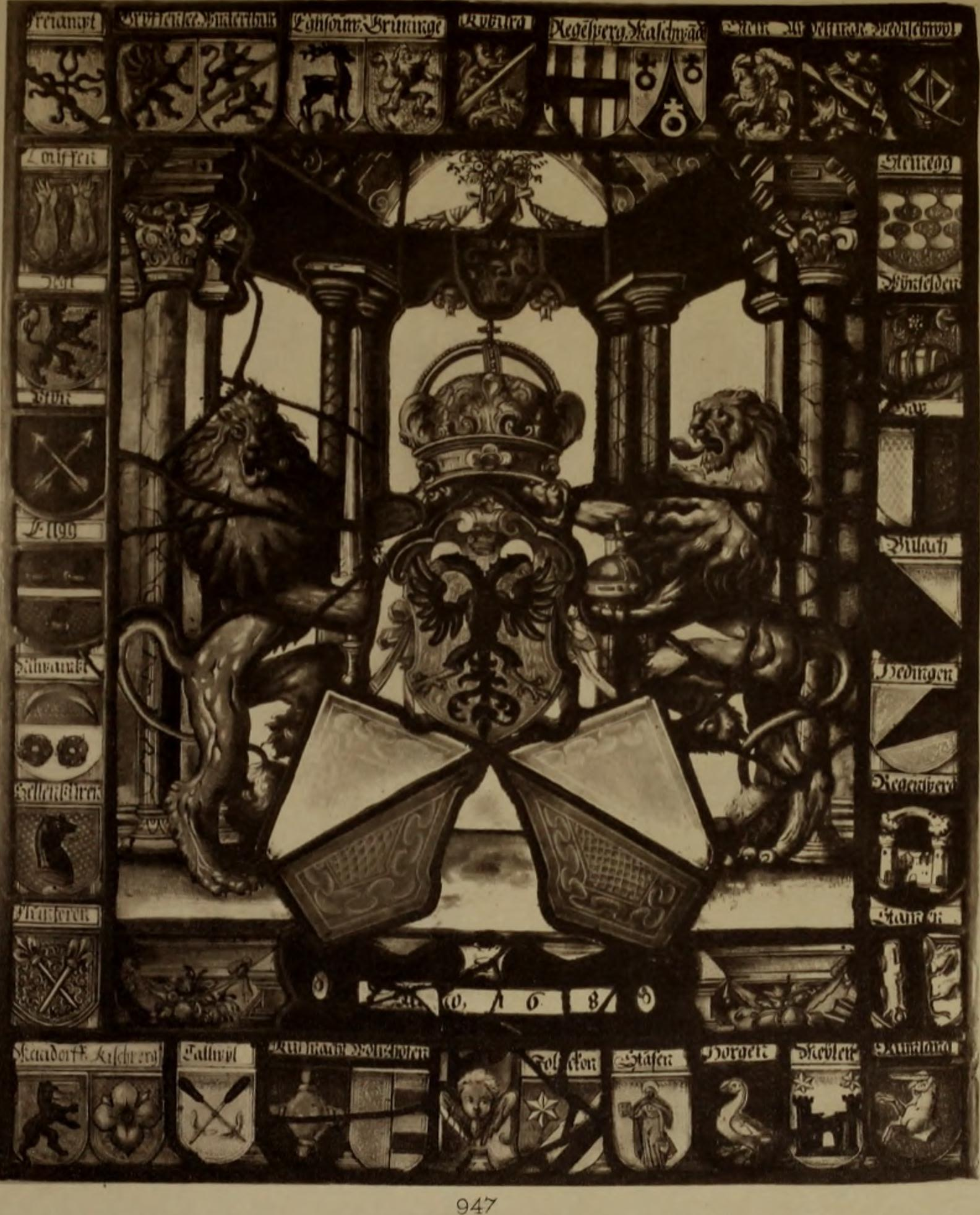
Panel of painted and leaded glass (1680)

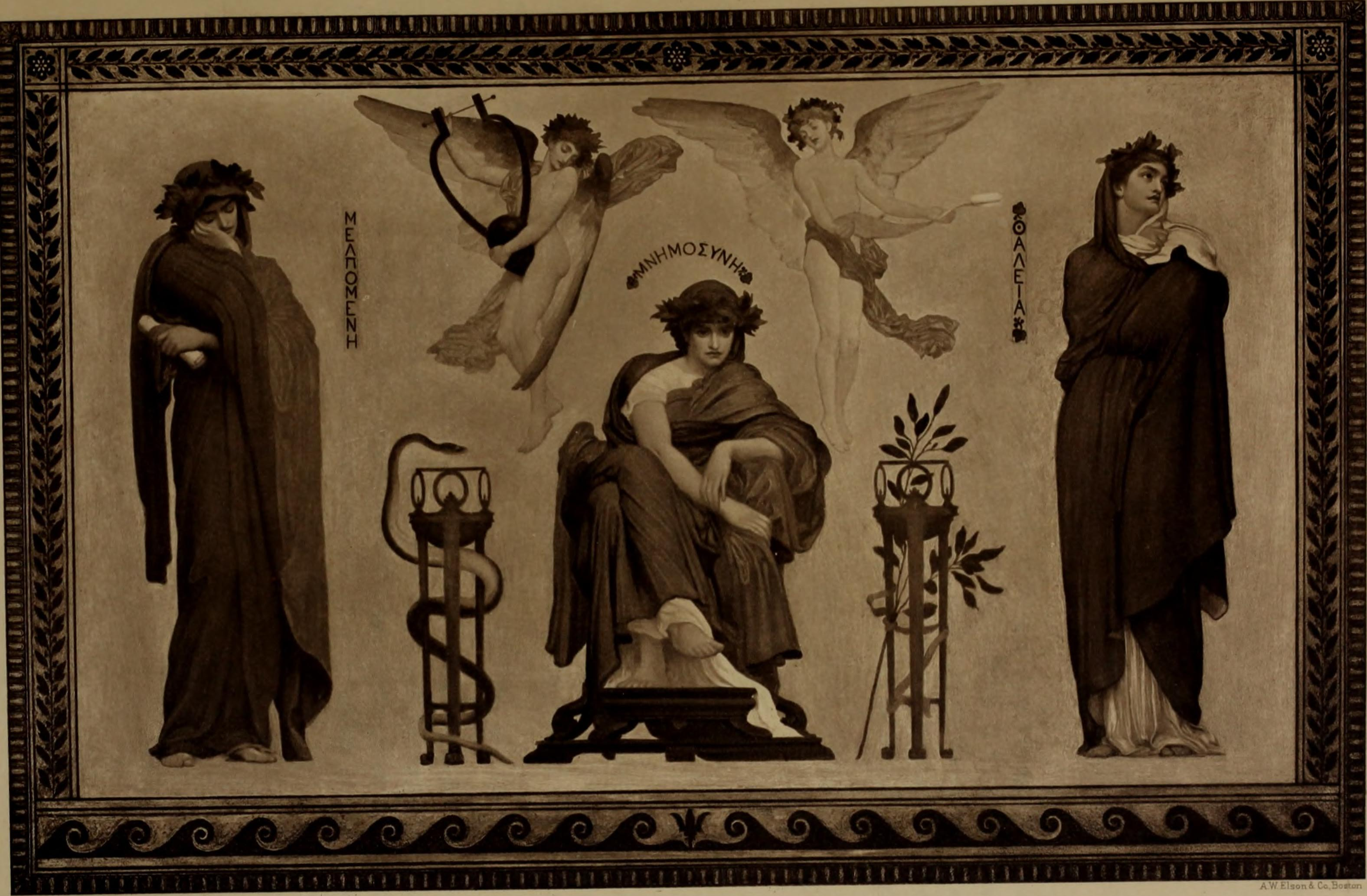
Study for the Ceiling of the Marquand Music Room by Frederic Leighton (c. 1886)

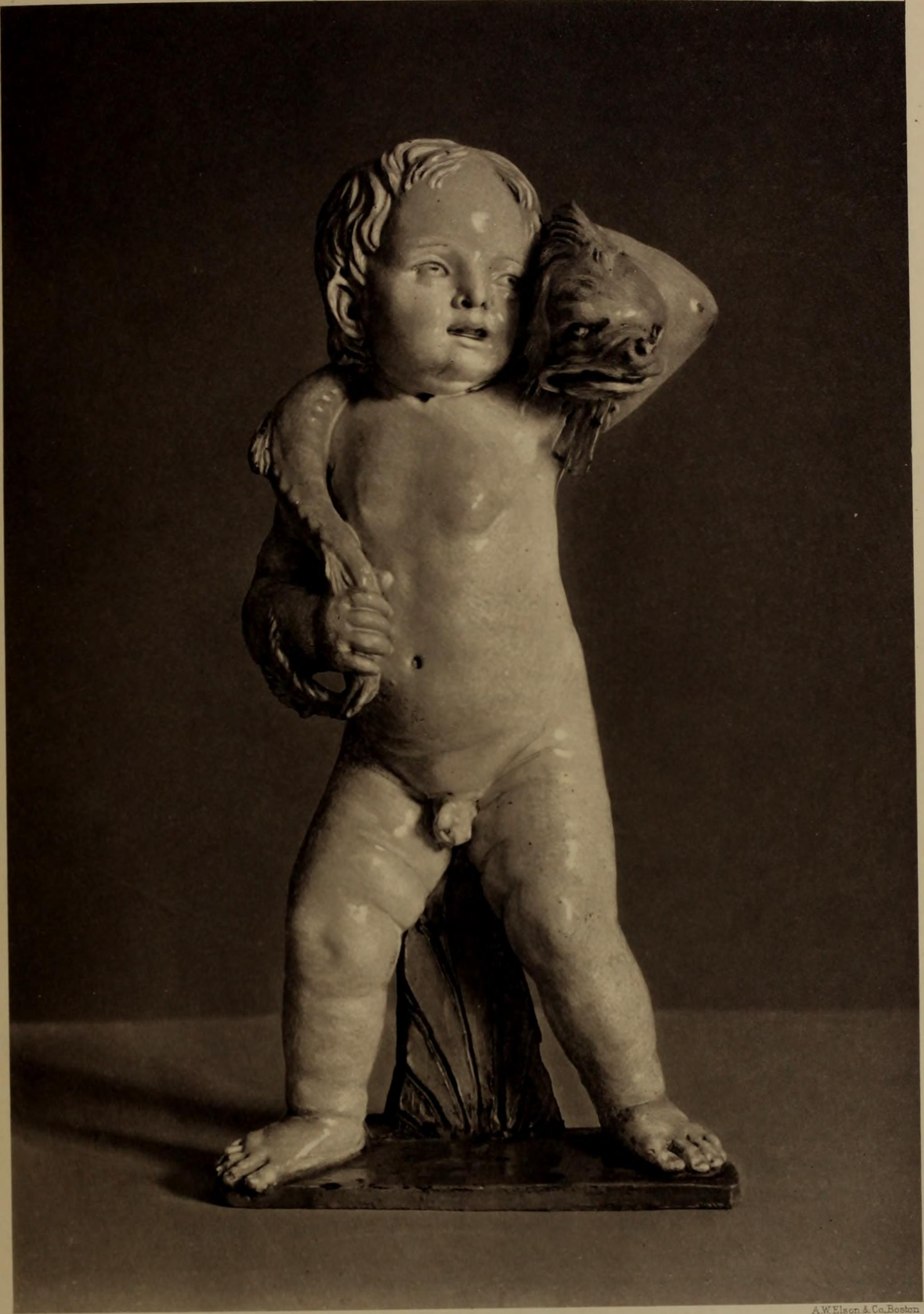
Sculpture by François Duquesnoy

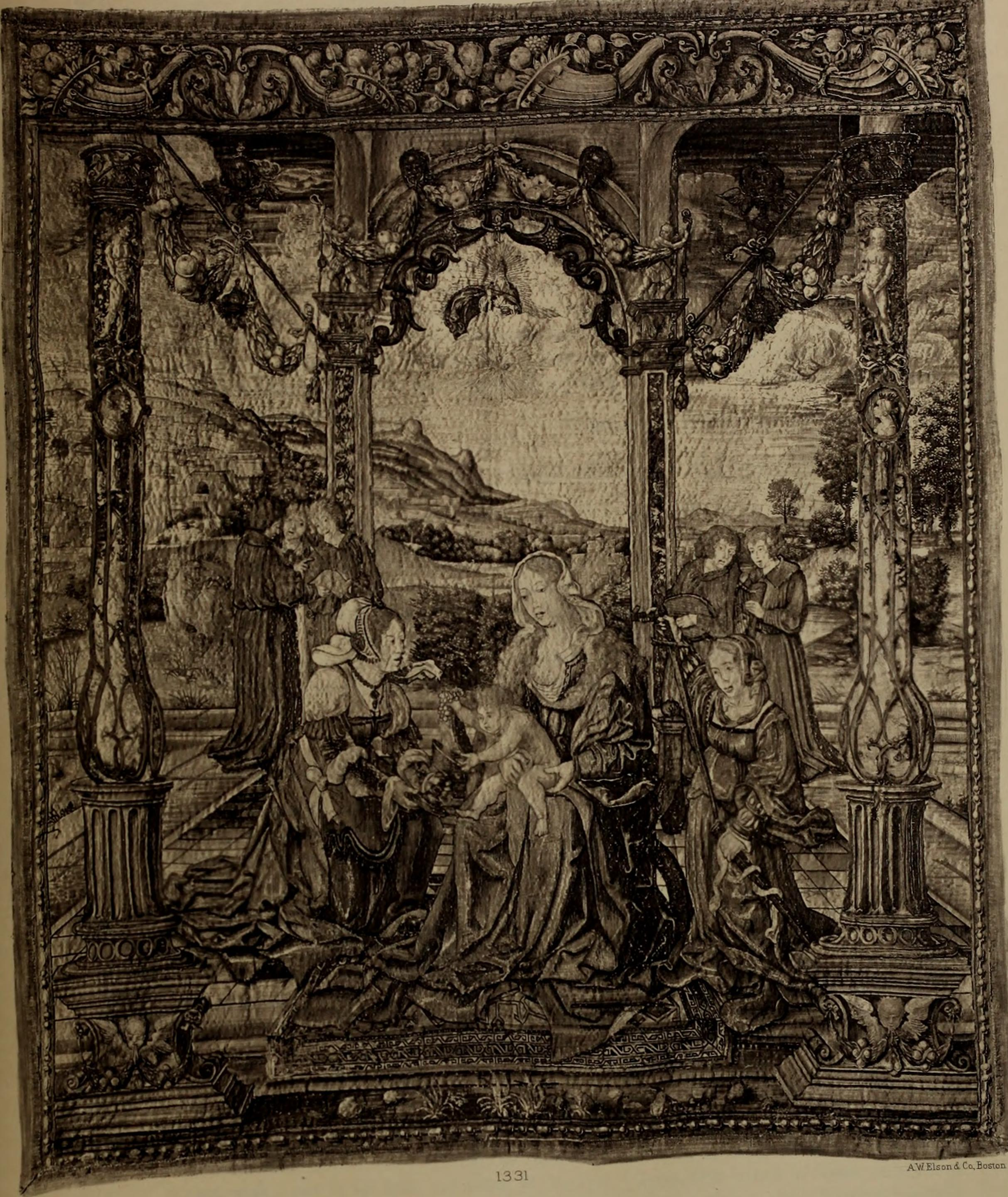
Rare cloth of gold tapestry

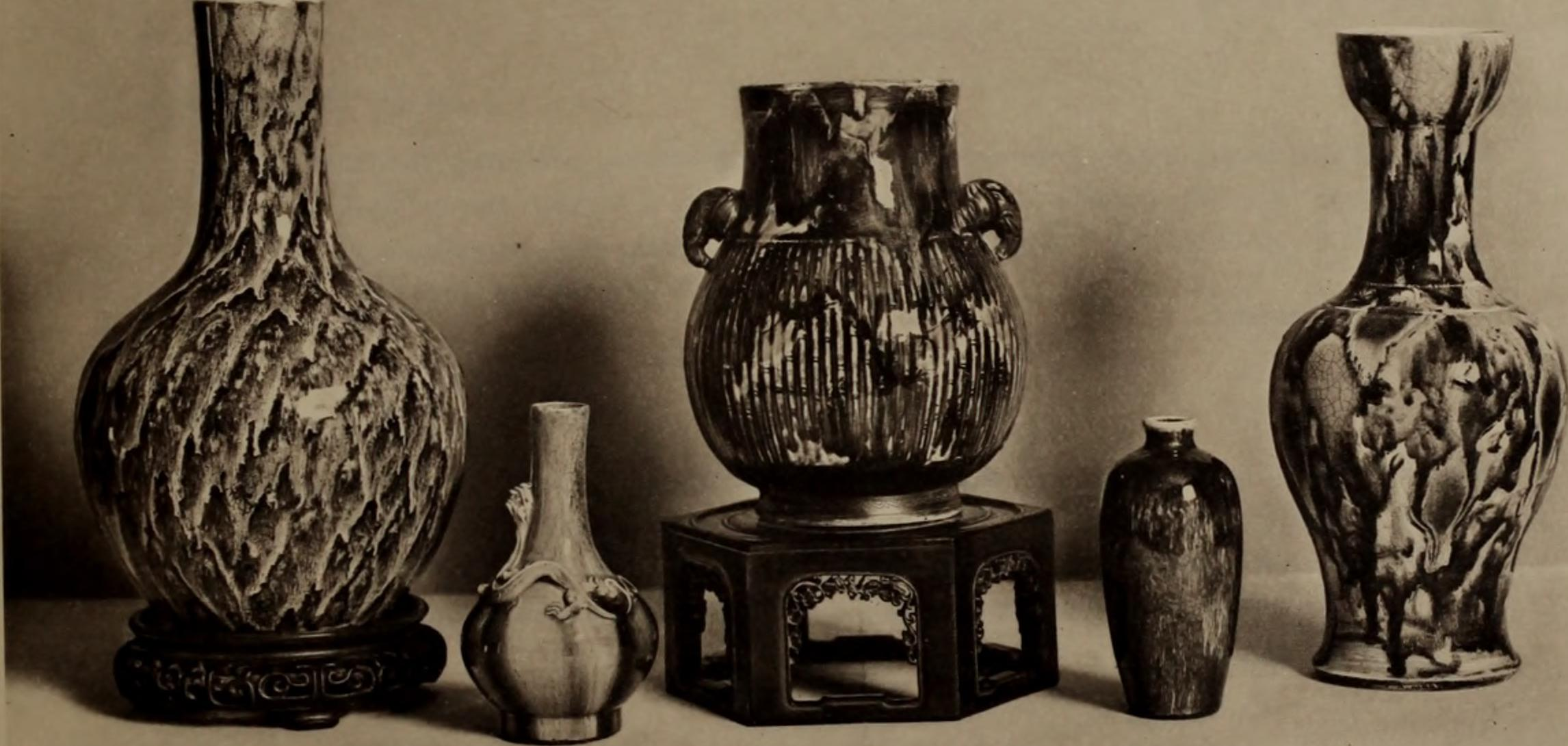

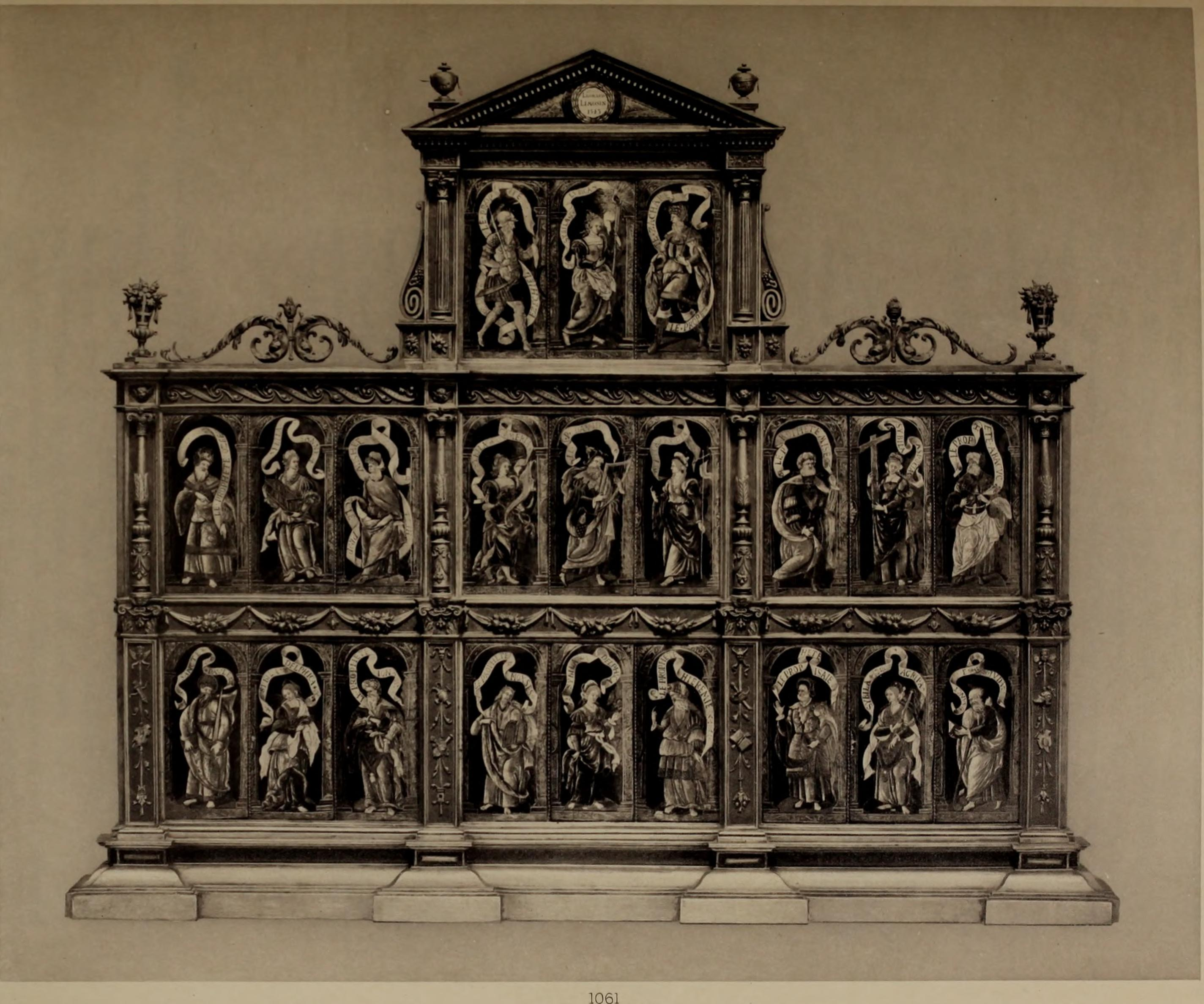
Screen or Retable for an altar signed by Léonard Limousin (1543)

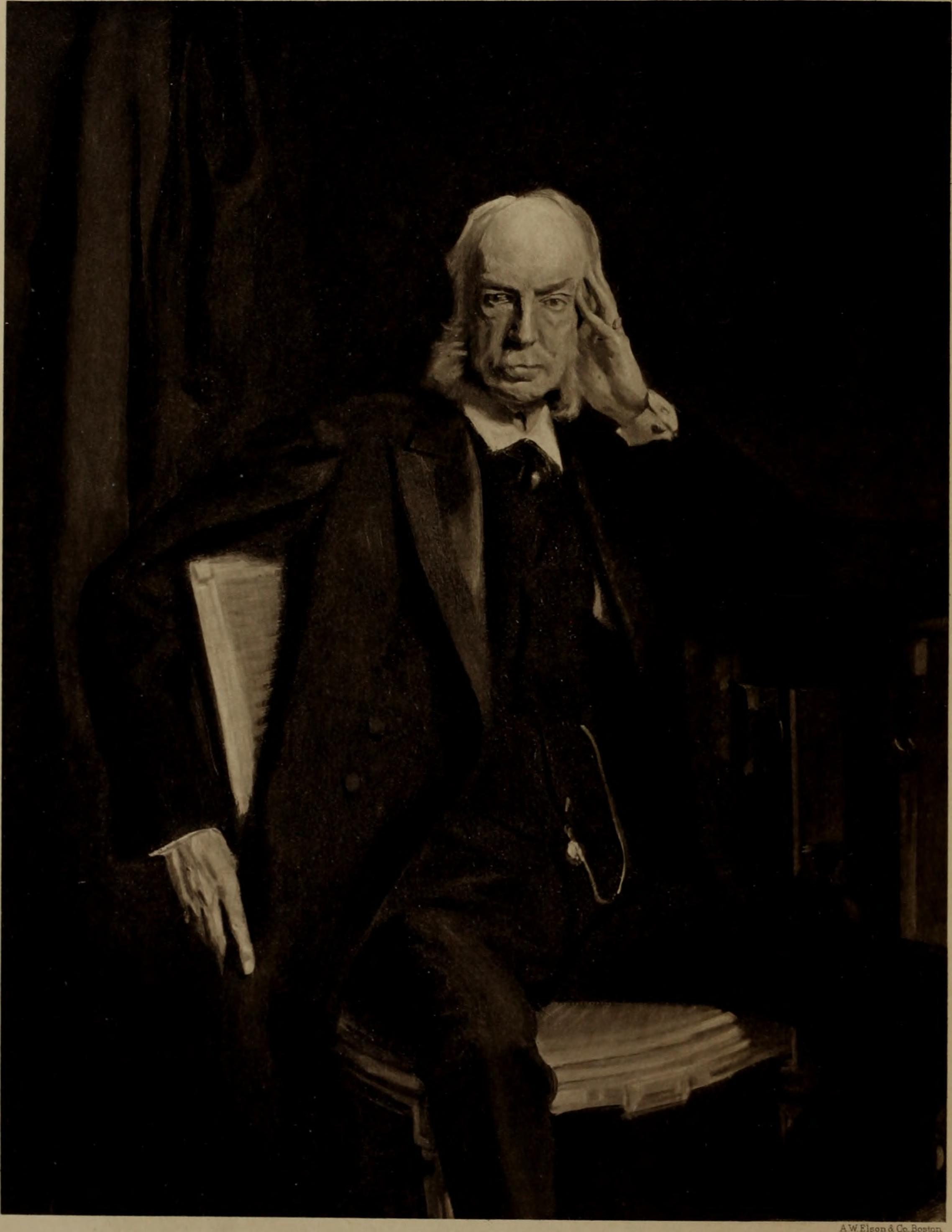
Portrait of Marquand, by John Singer Sargent, 1897.

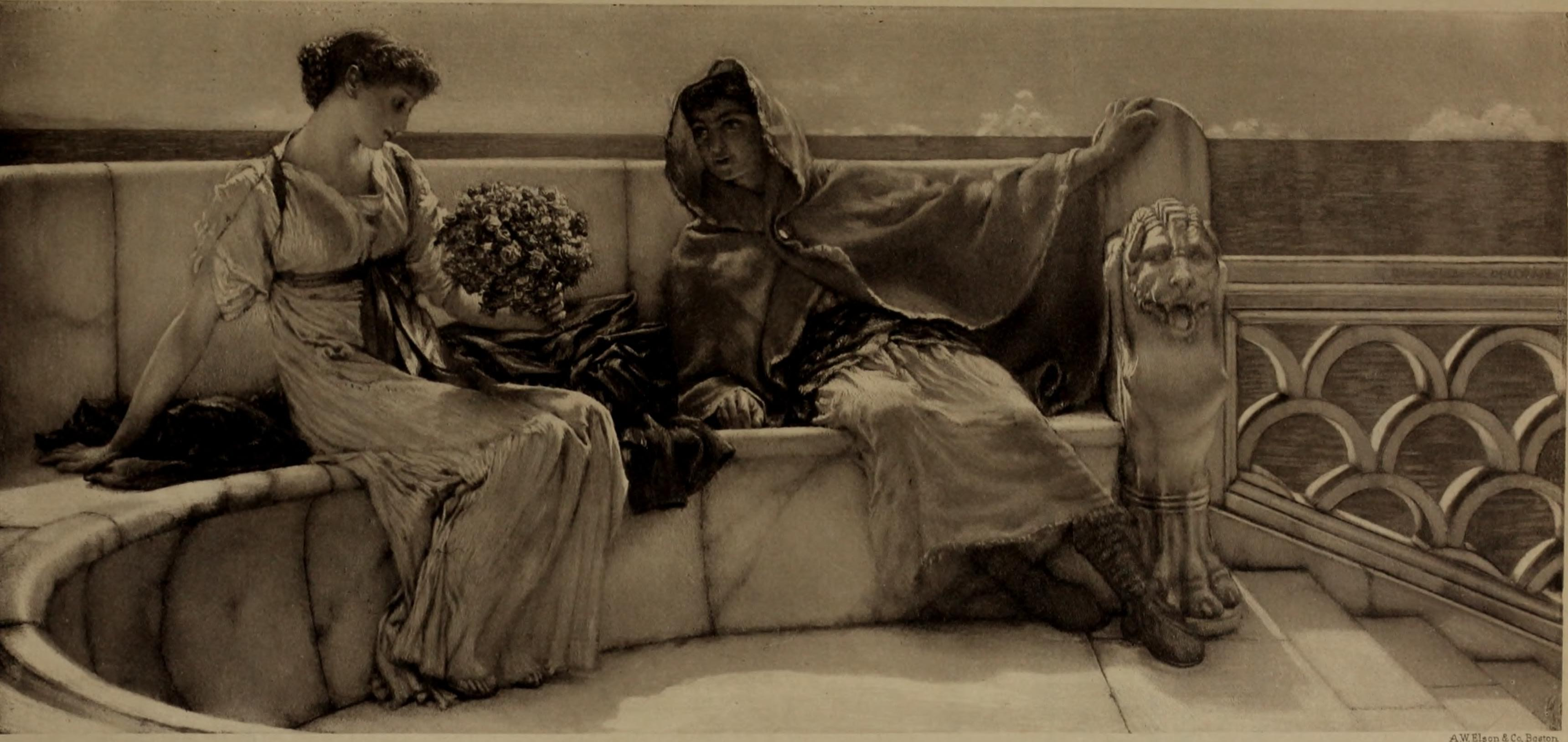
Amo Te, Ama Me by Sir Lawrence Alma-Tadema (1881)

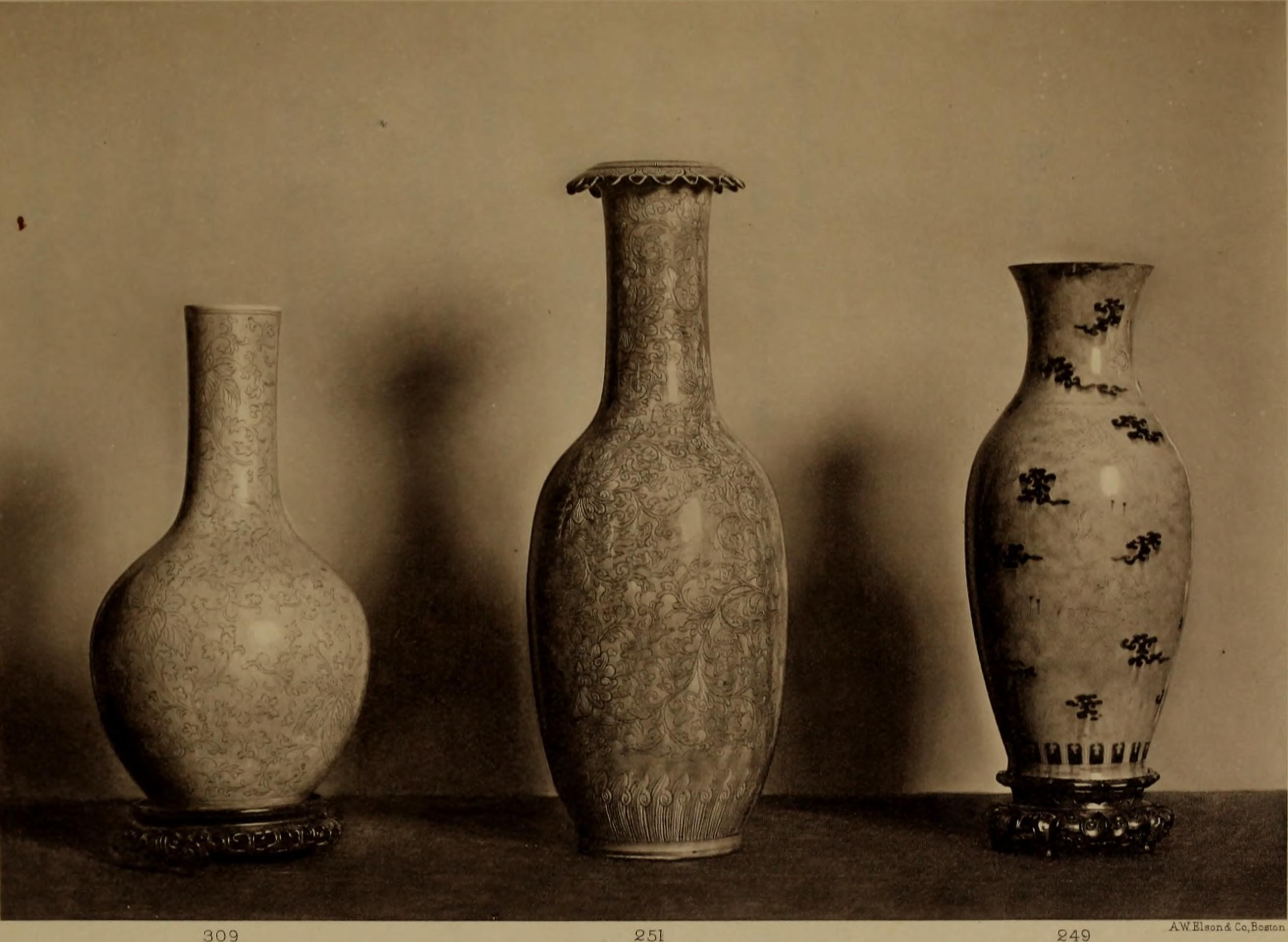

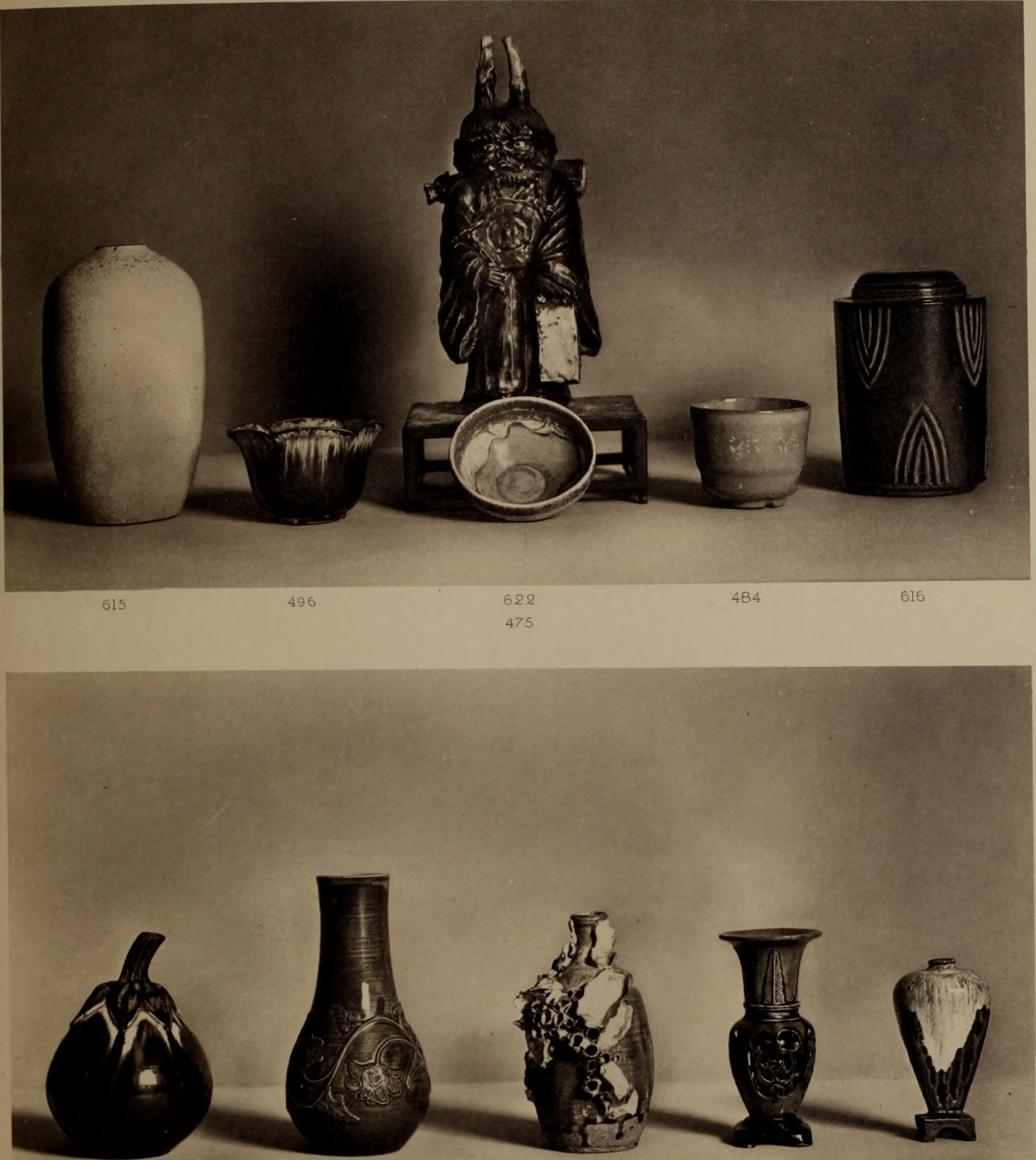

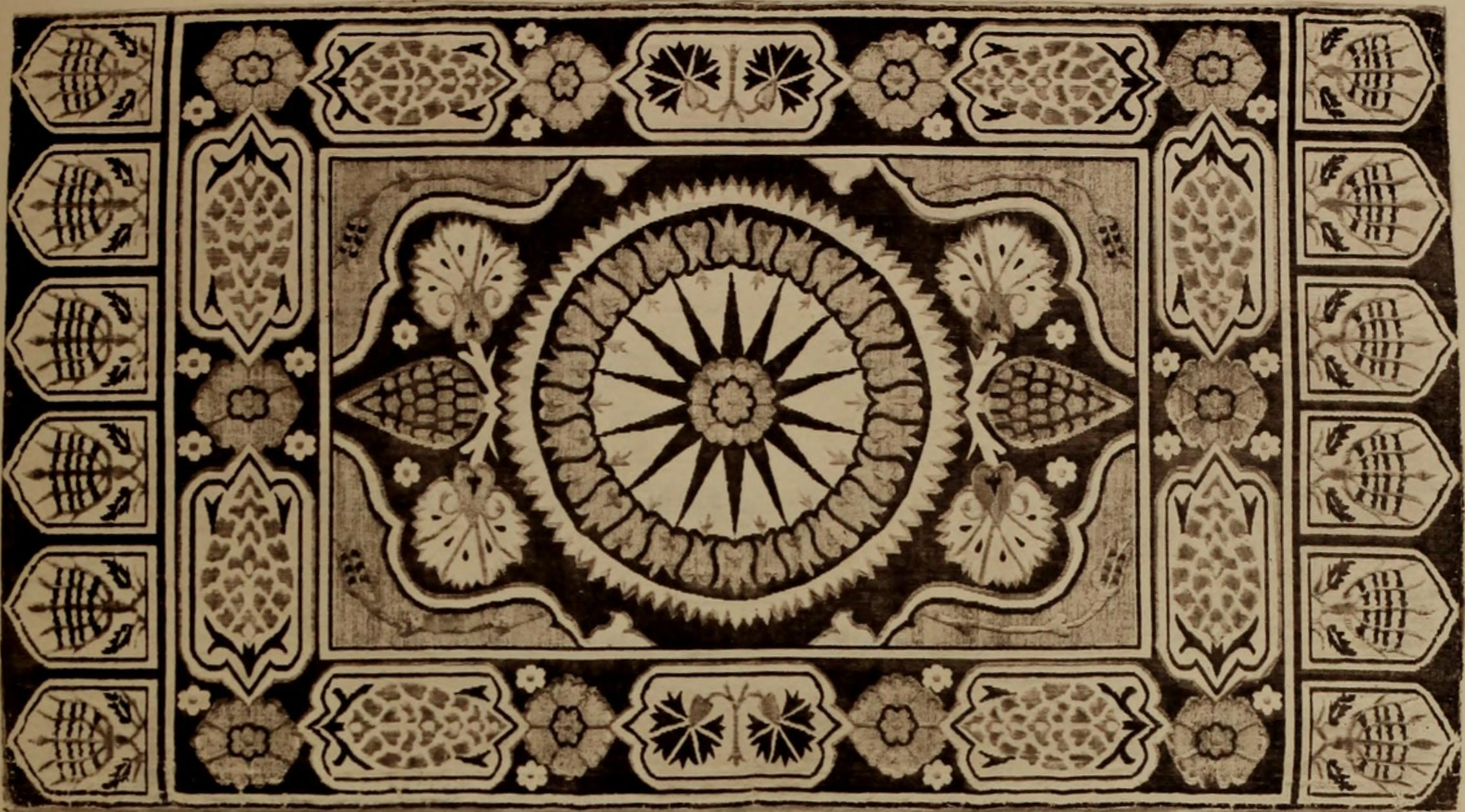
Rich Venetian Velvet Panel (16th century)

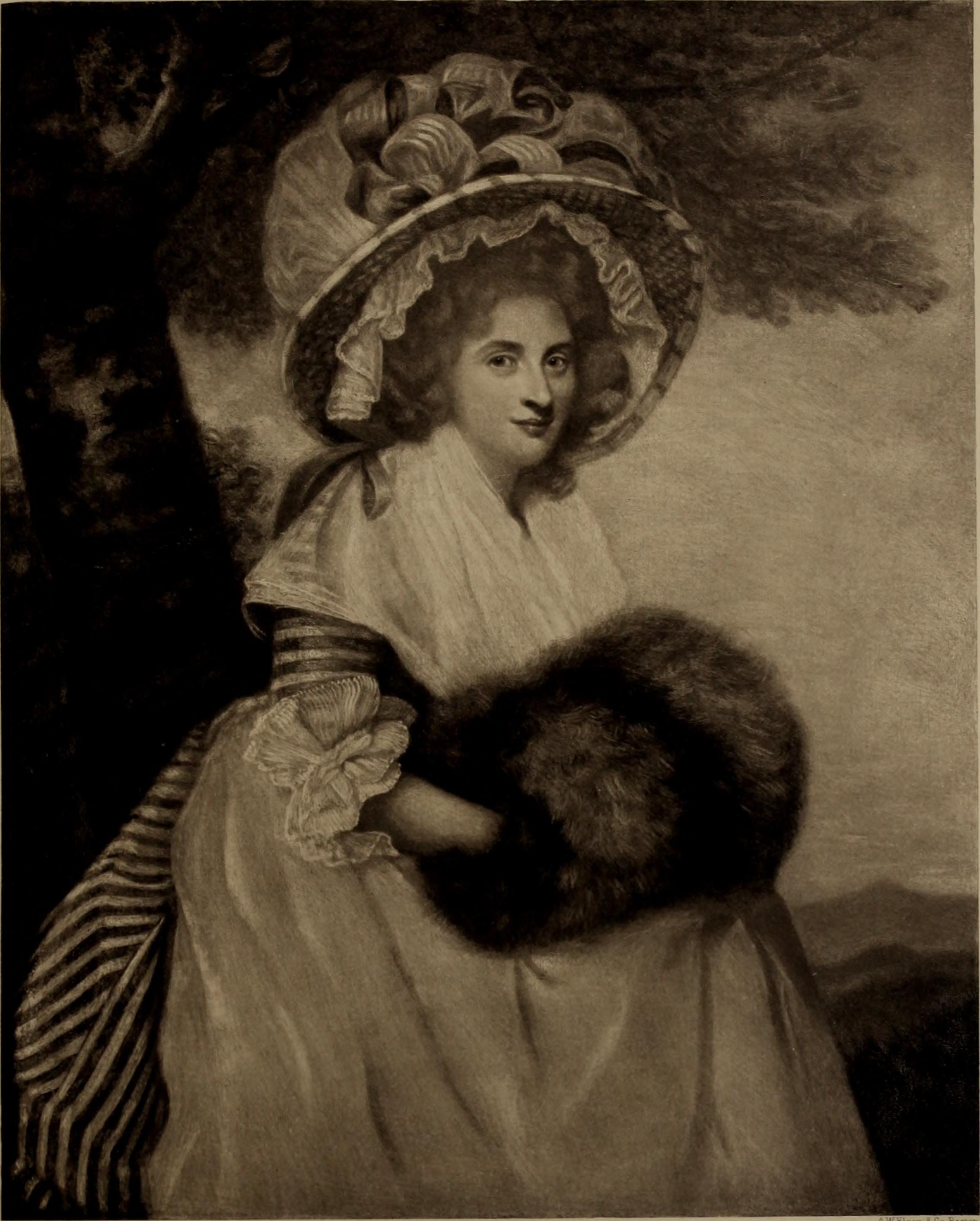
Portrait of Mrs Wells by Sir Joshua Reynolds (Note: Marquand acquired the painting from the collection of The Rt. Hon. Edward Pleydell-Bouverie. In the 1903 sale, the painting was incorrectly listed as by George Romney and was acquired by Sir [R?] Cooper. In 2008, it was sold by Christie's for £49,250.)

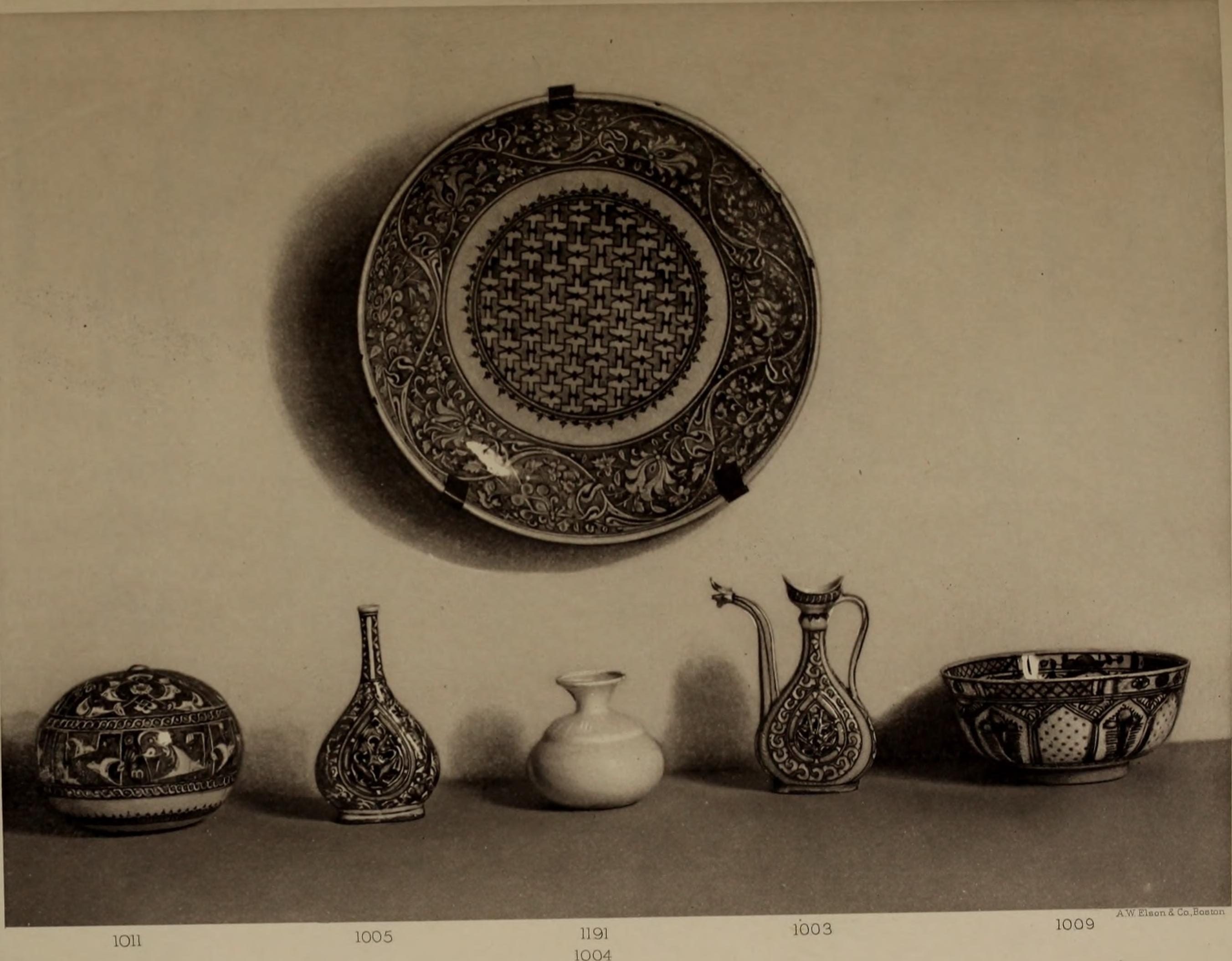

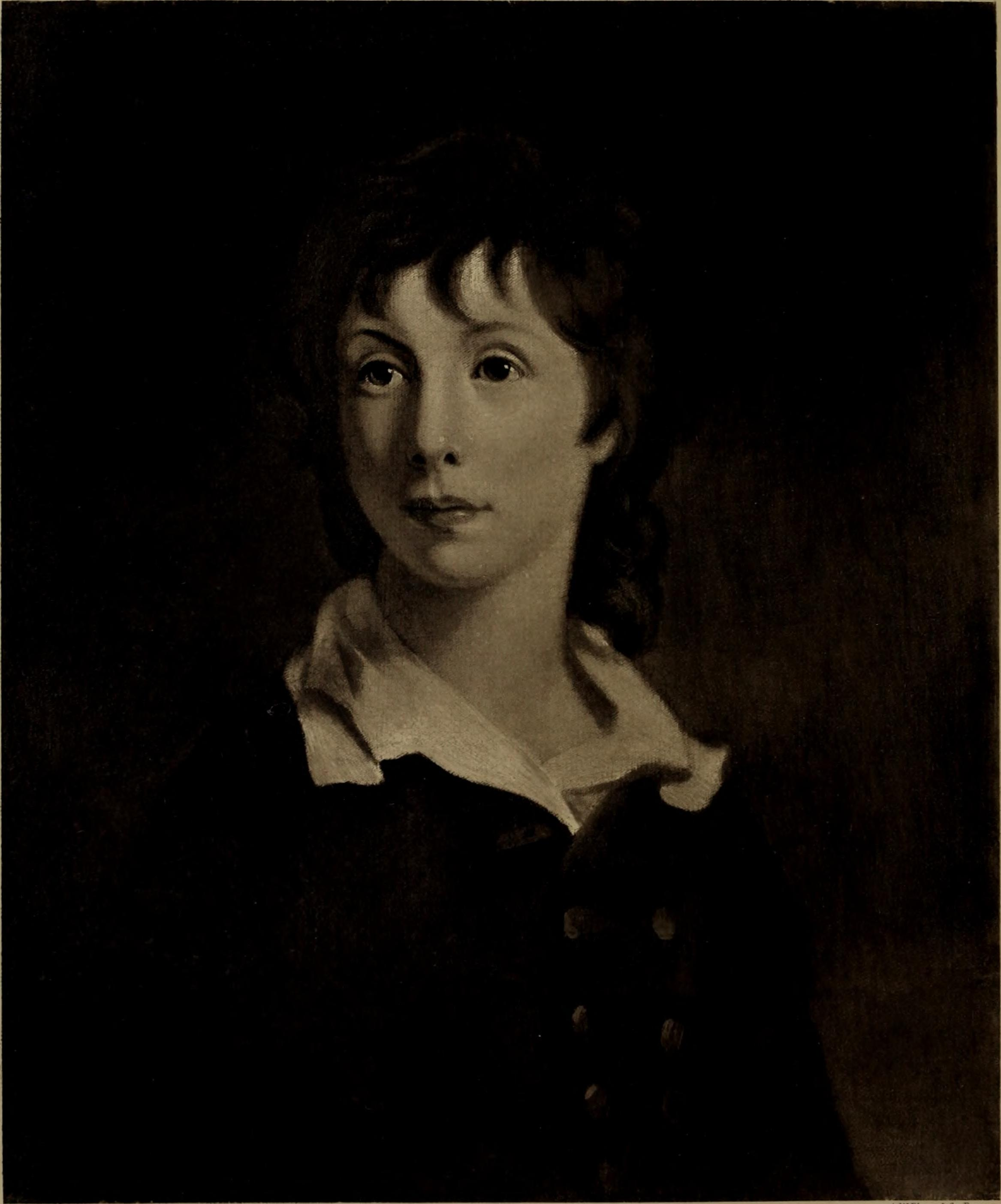
Portrait of young Shelley by John Hoppner (1805)

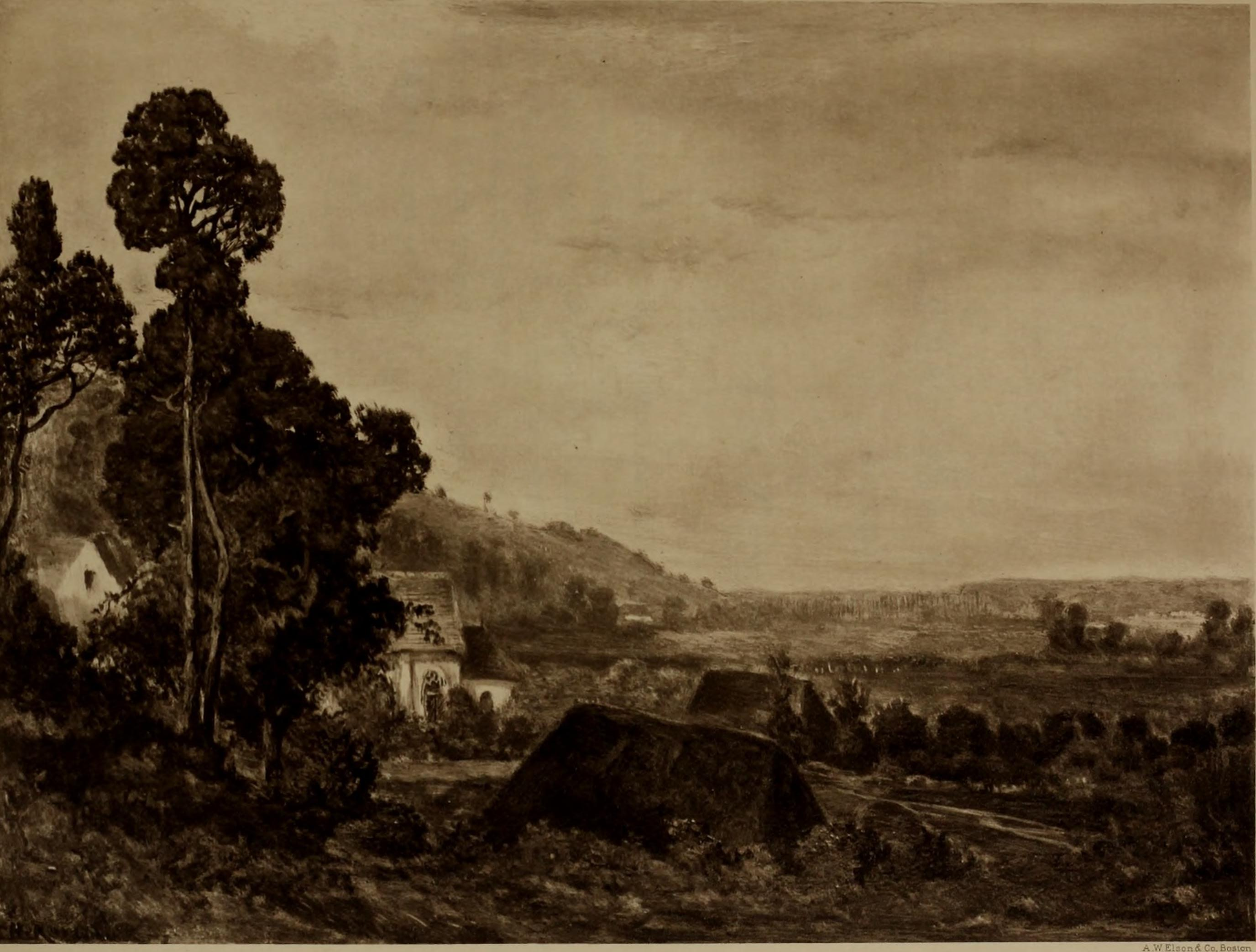
An Old Chapel in a Valley by Théodore Rousseau (c. 1835)

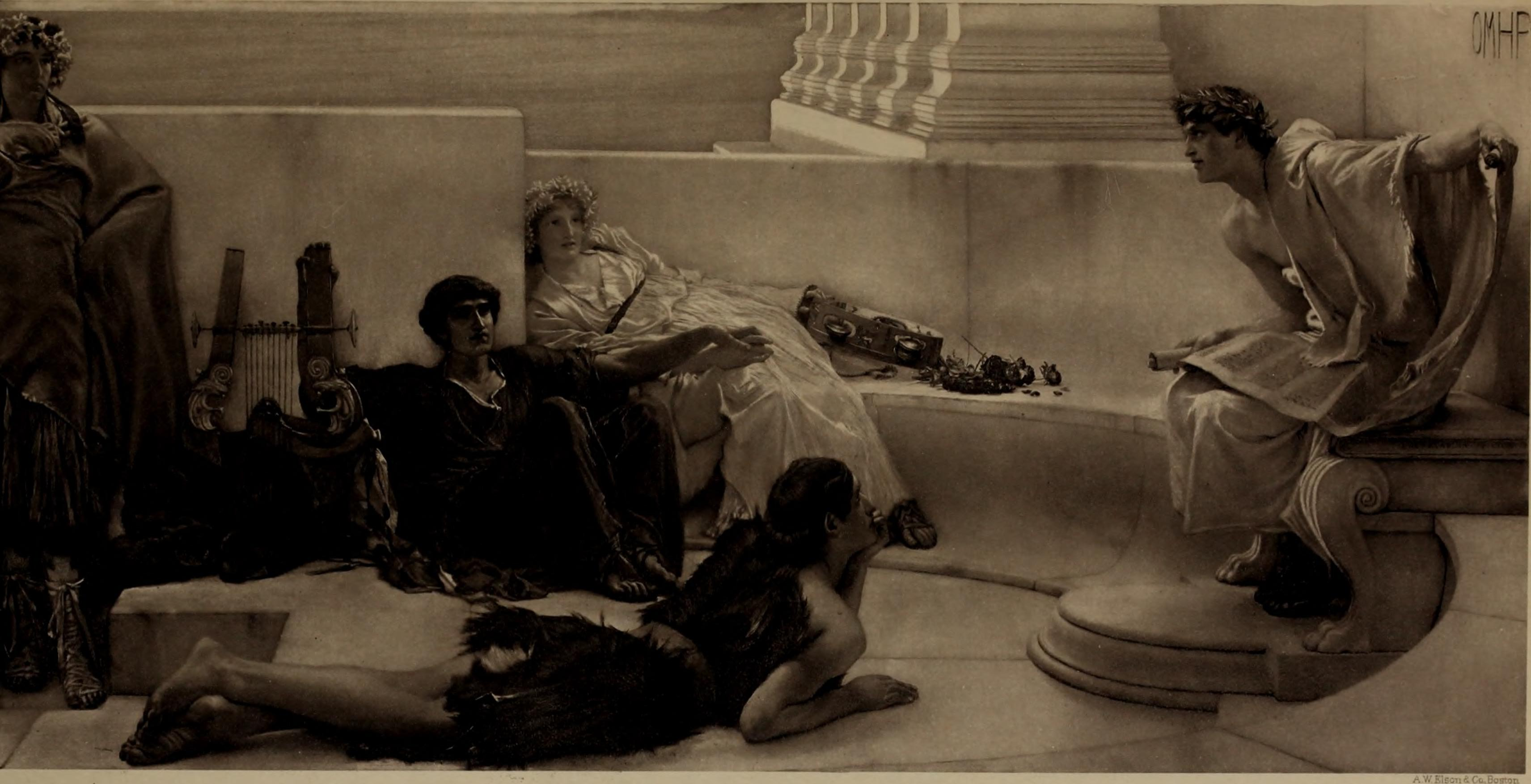
A Reading from Homer Sir Lawrence Alma-Tadema (1885)

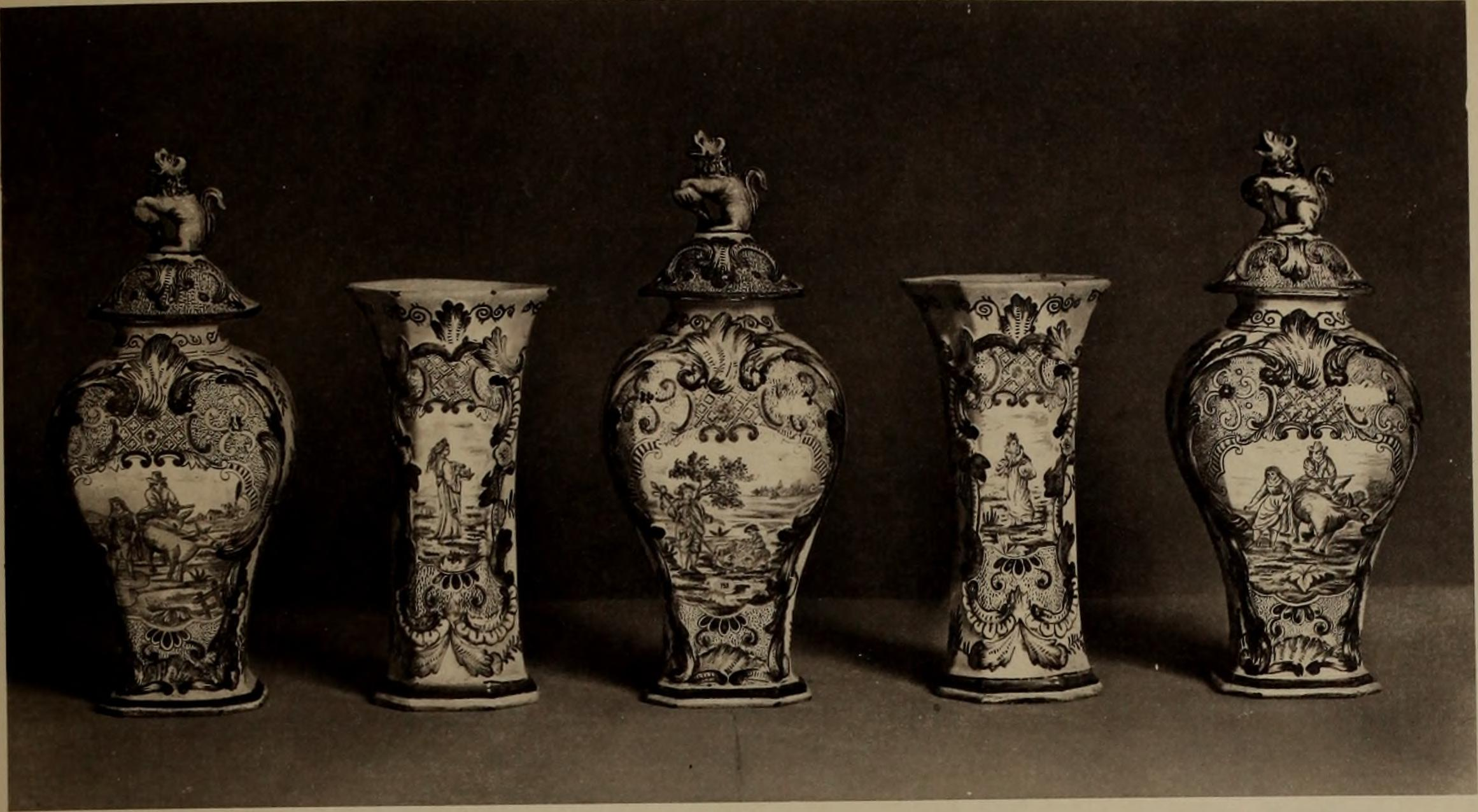

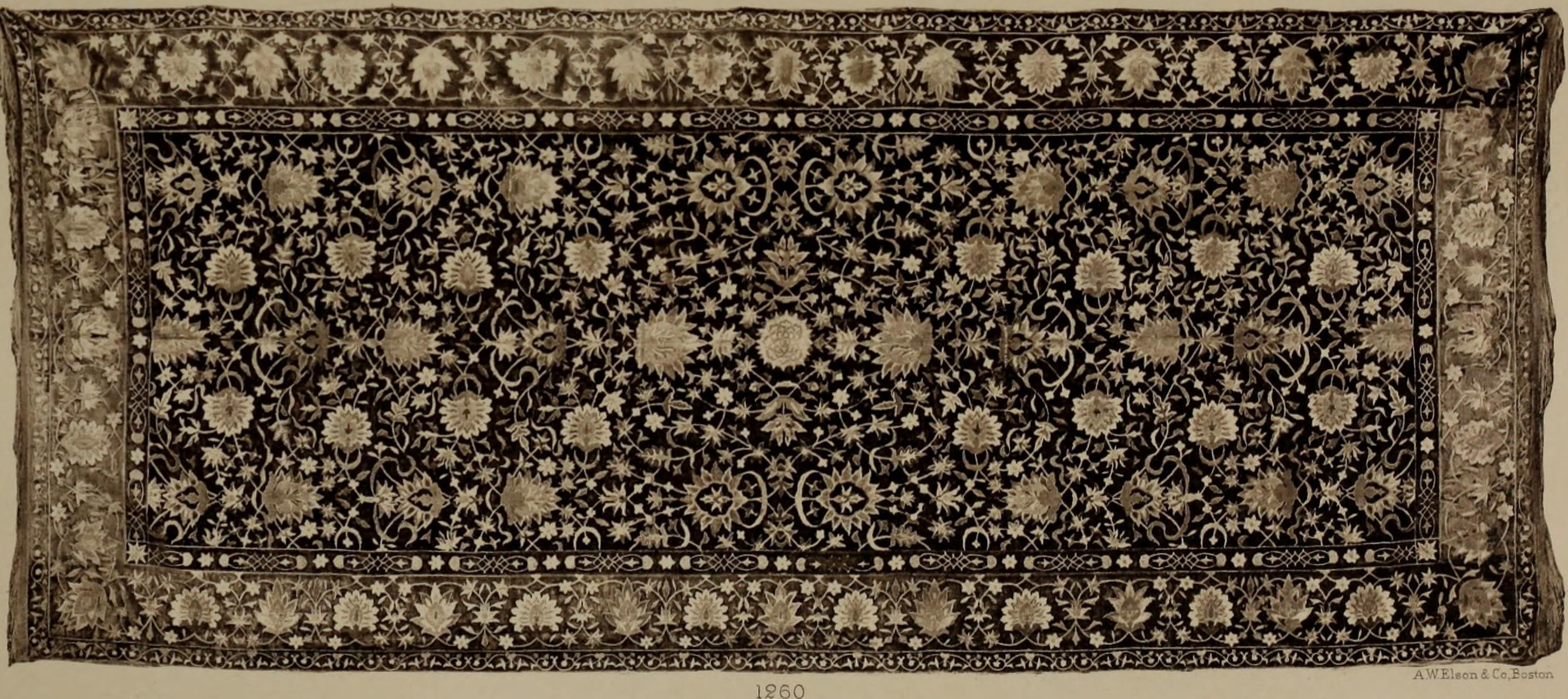

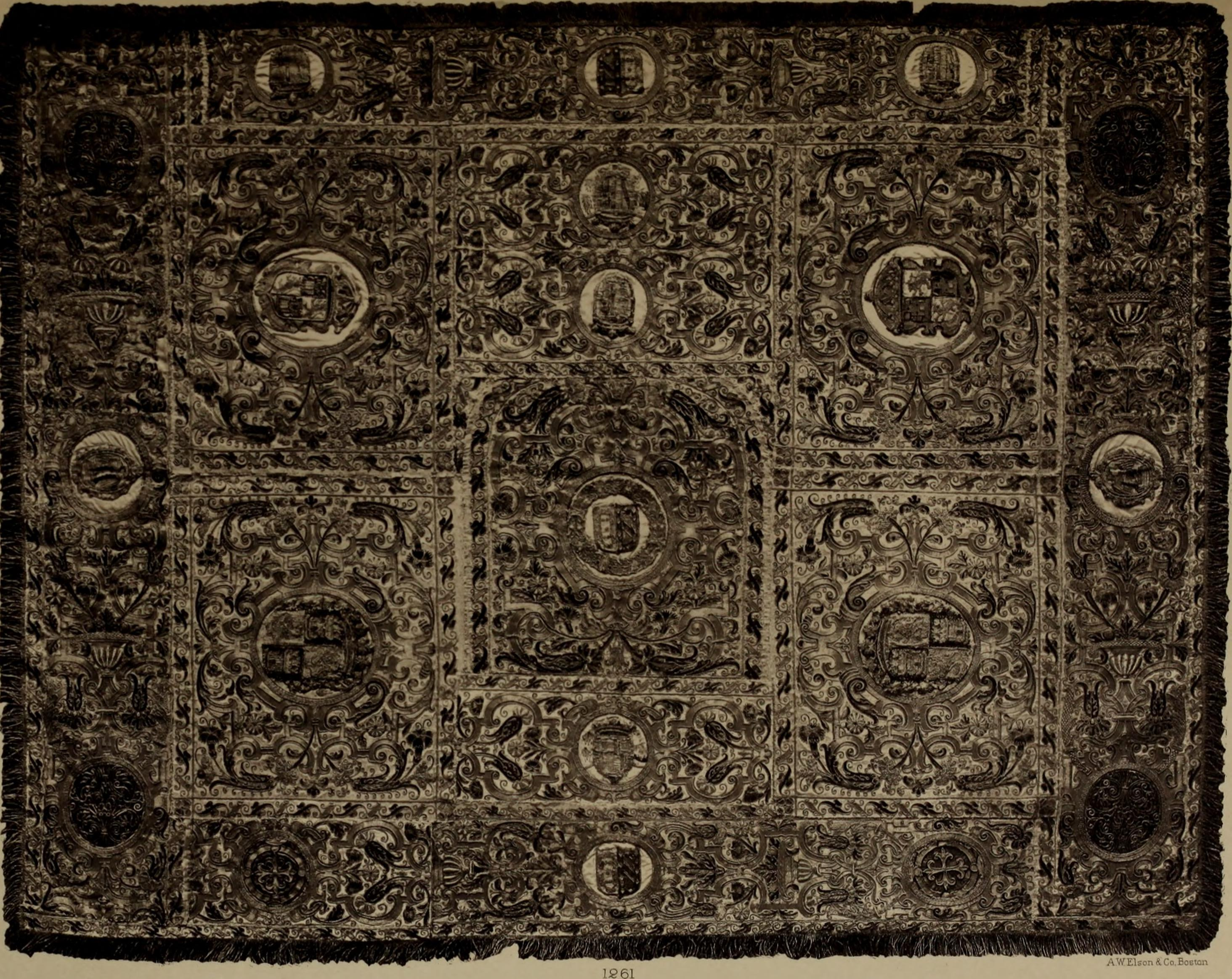

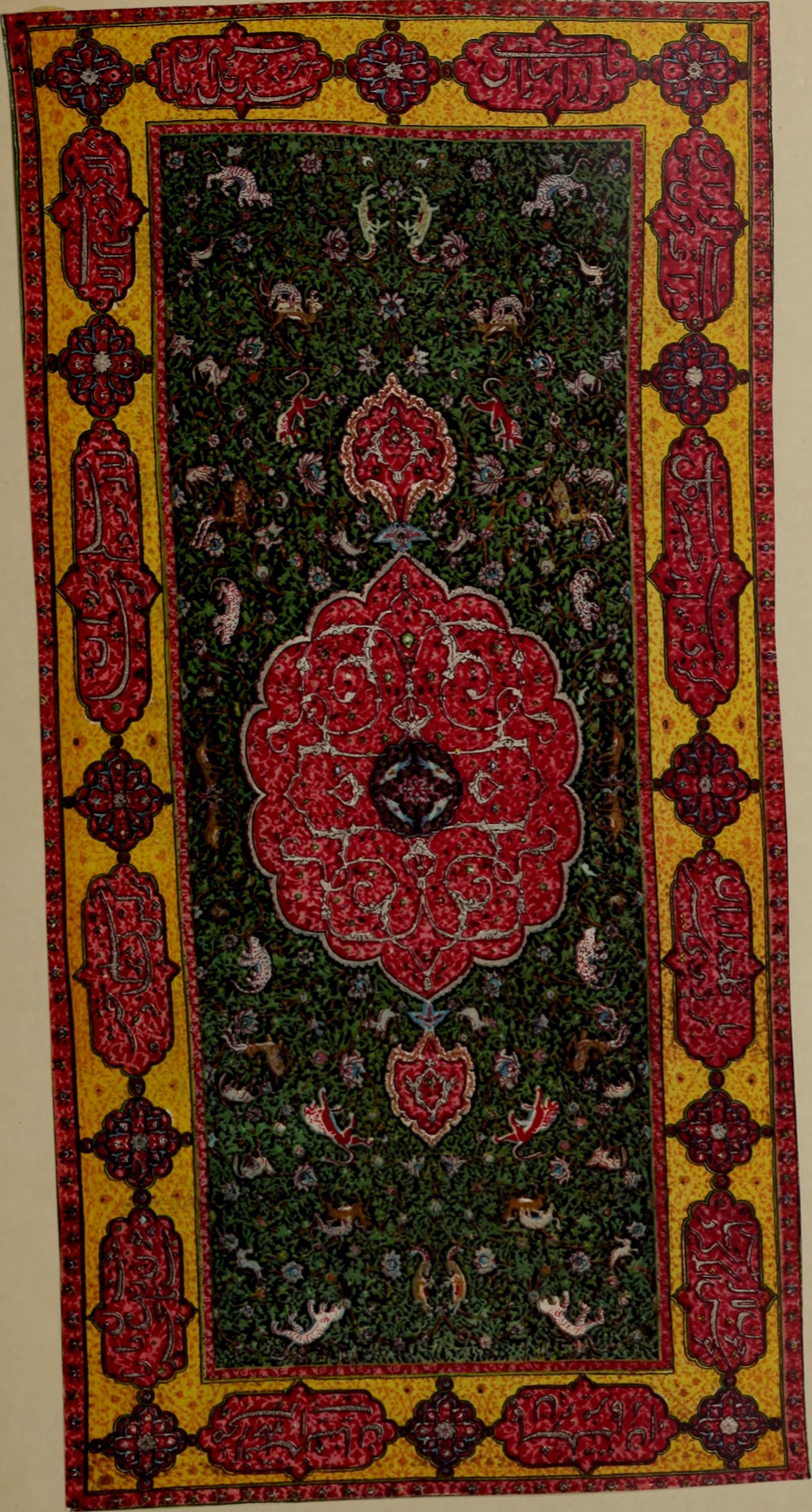

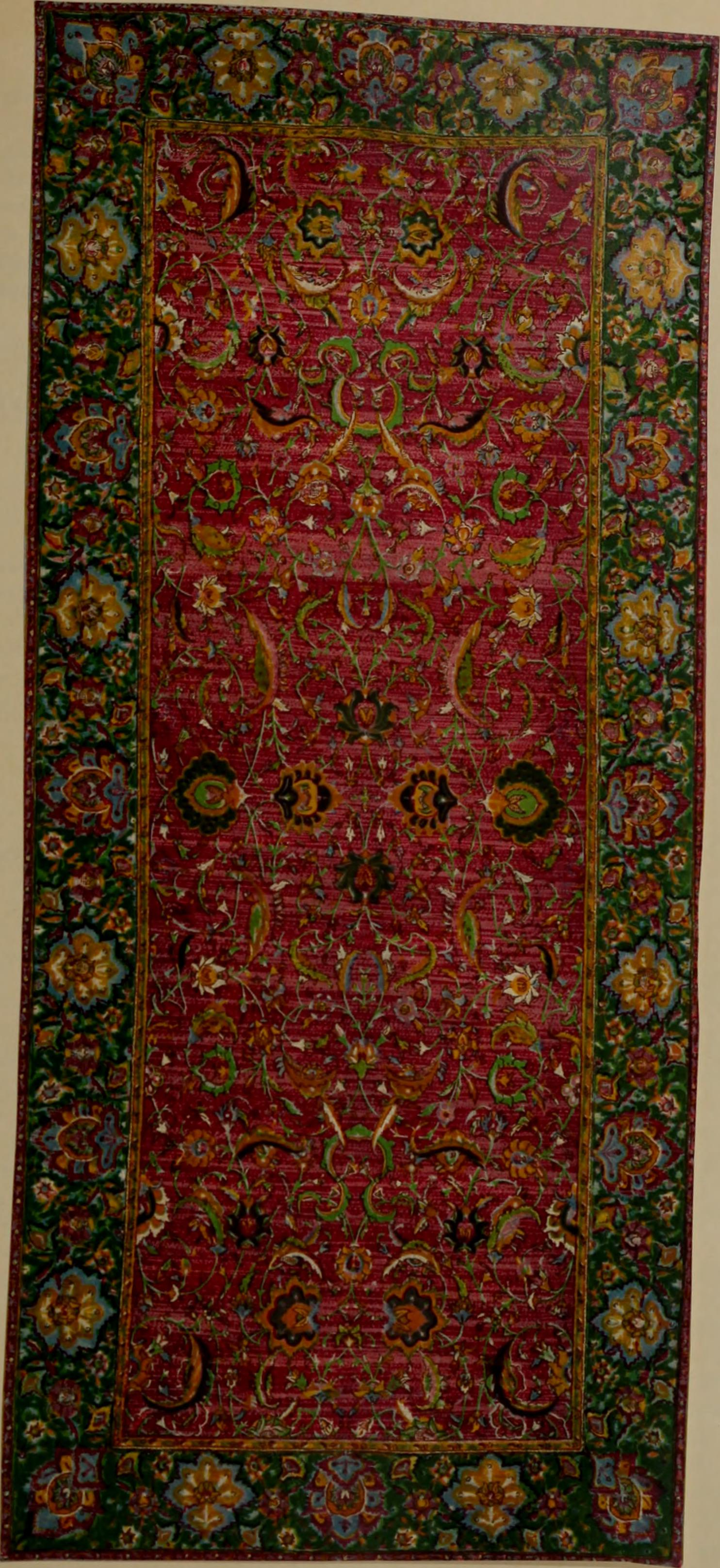

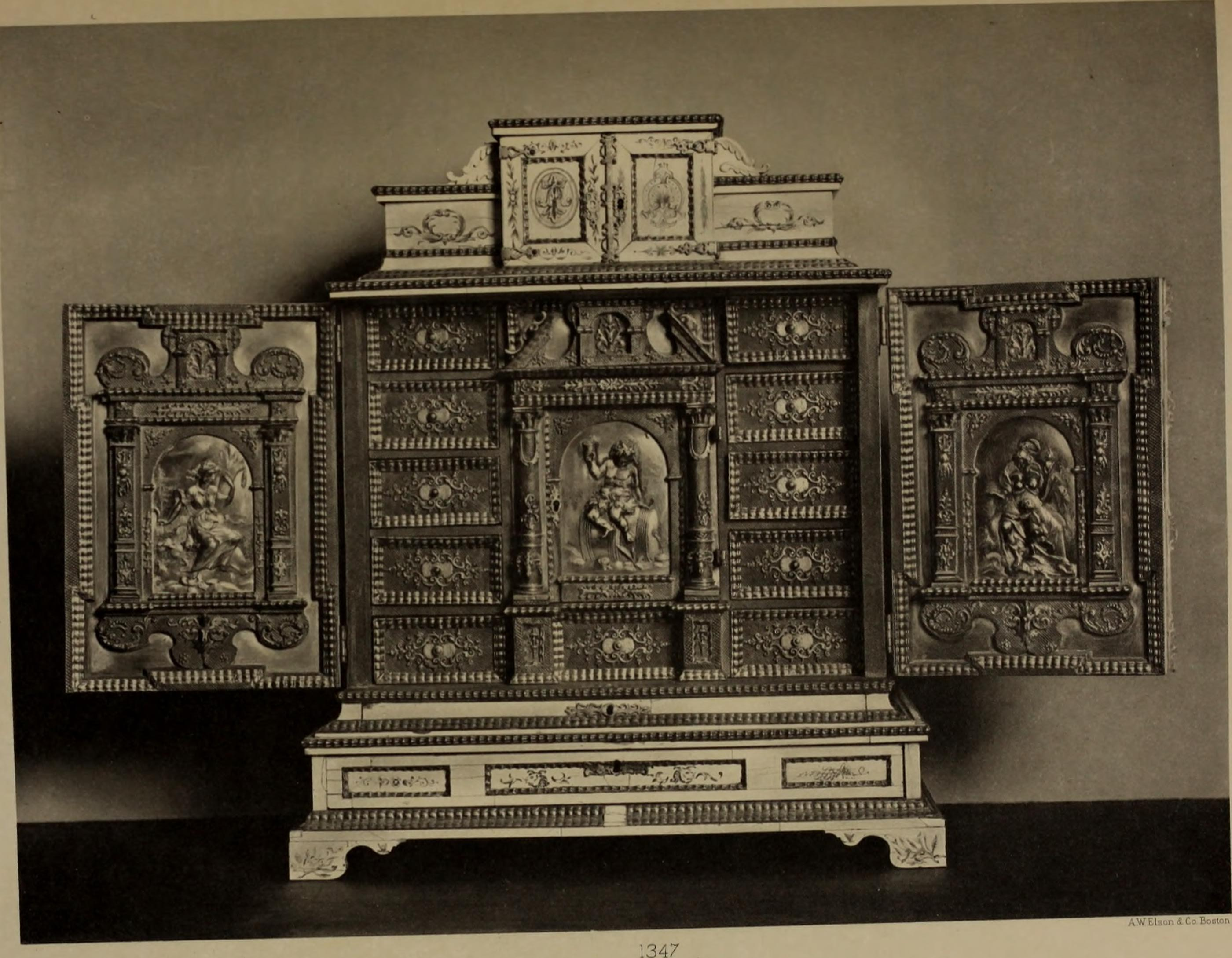
Antique Ivory Cabinet

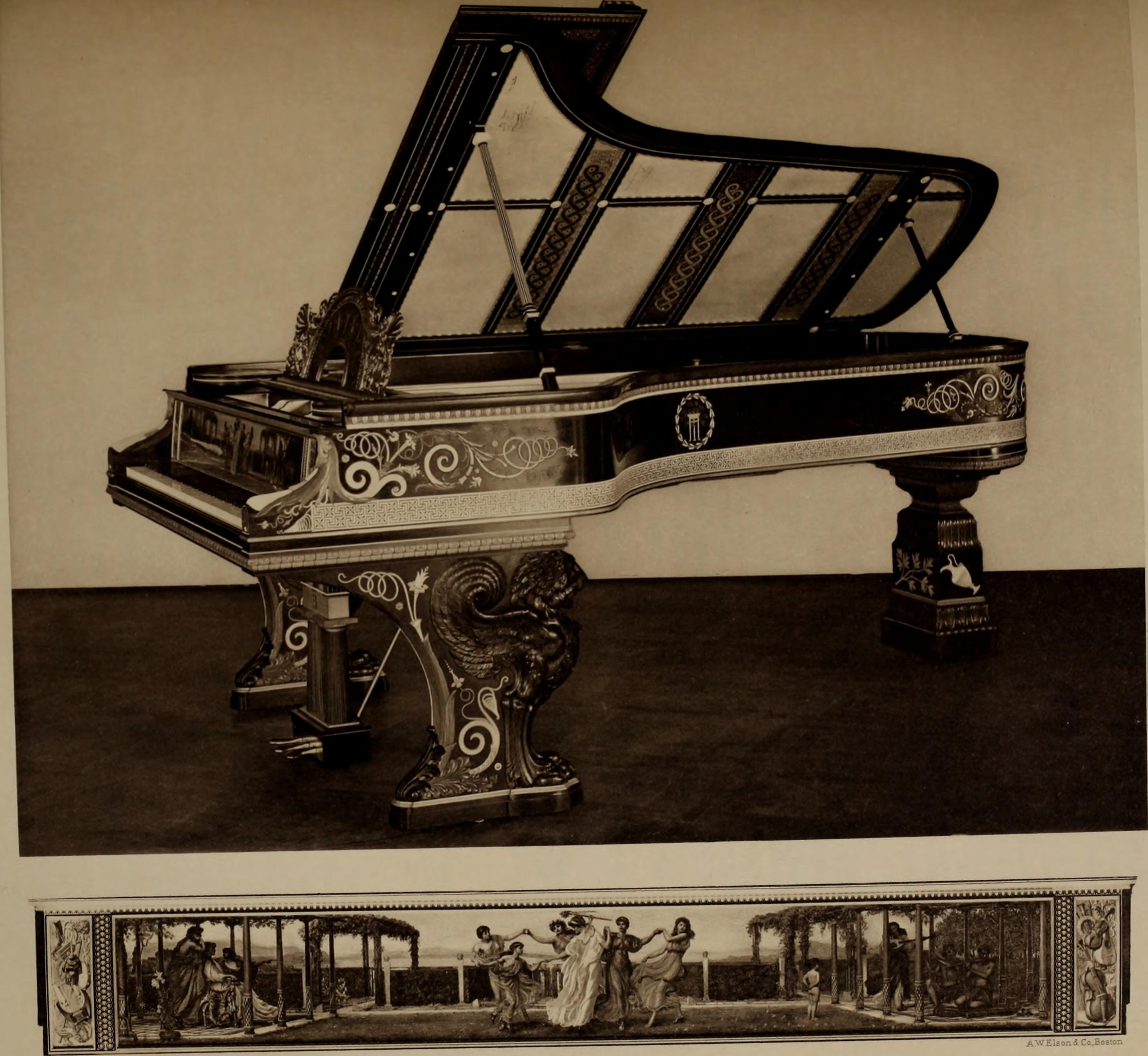
1884 Steinway grand piano designed by Sir Lawrence Alma-Tadema

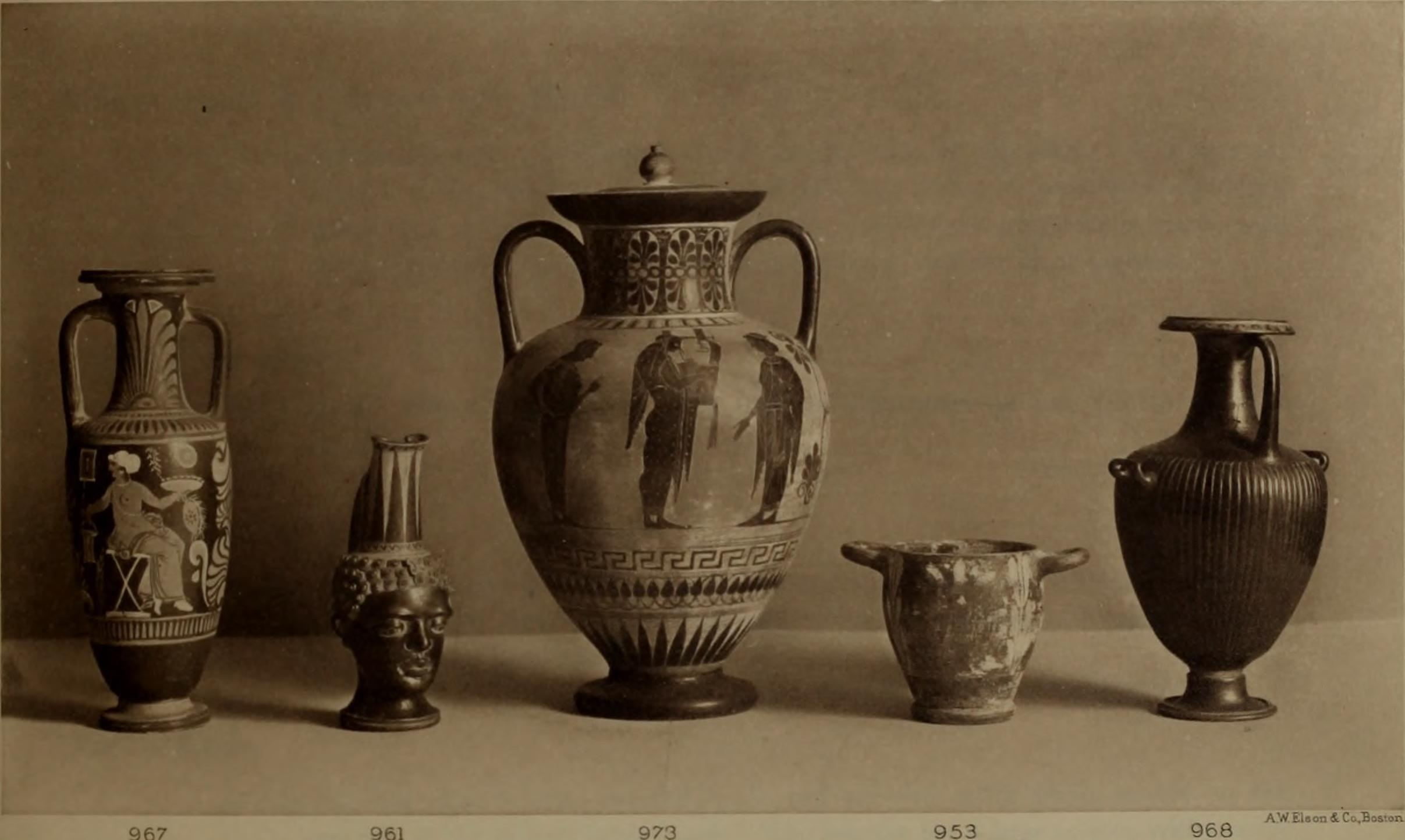

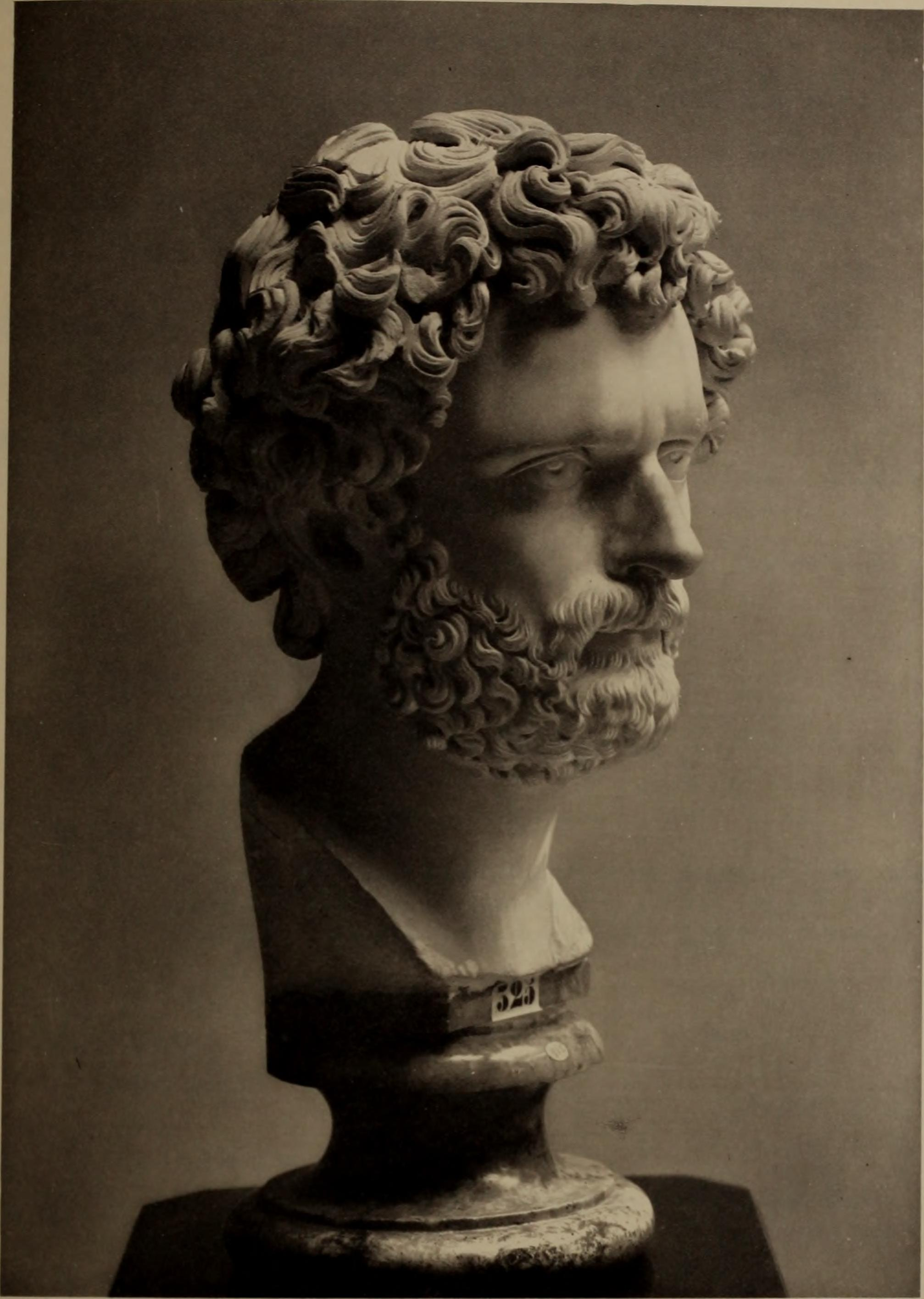
Greek and Roman Marble Sculpture

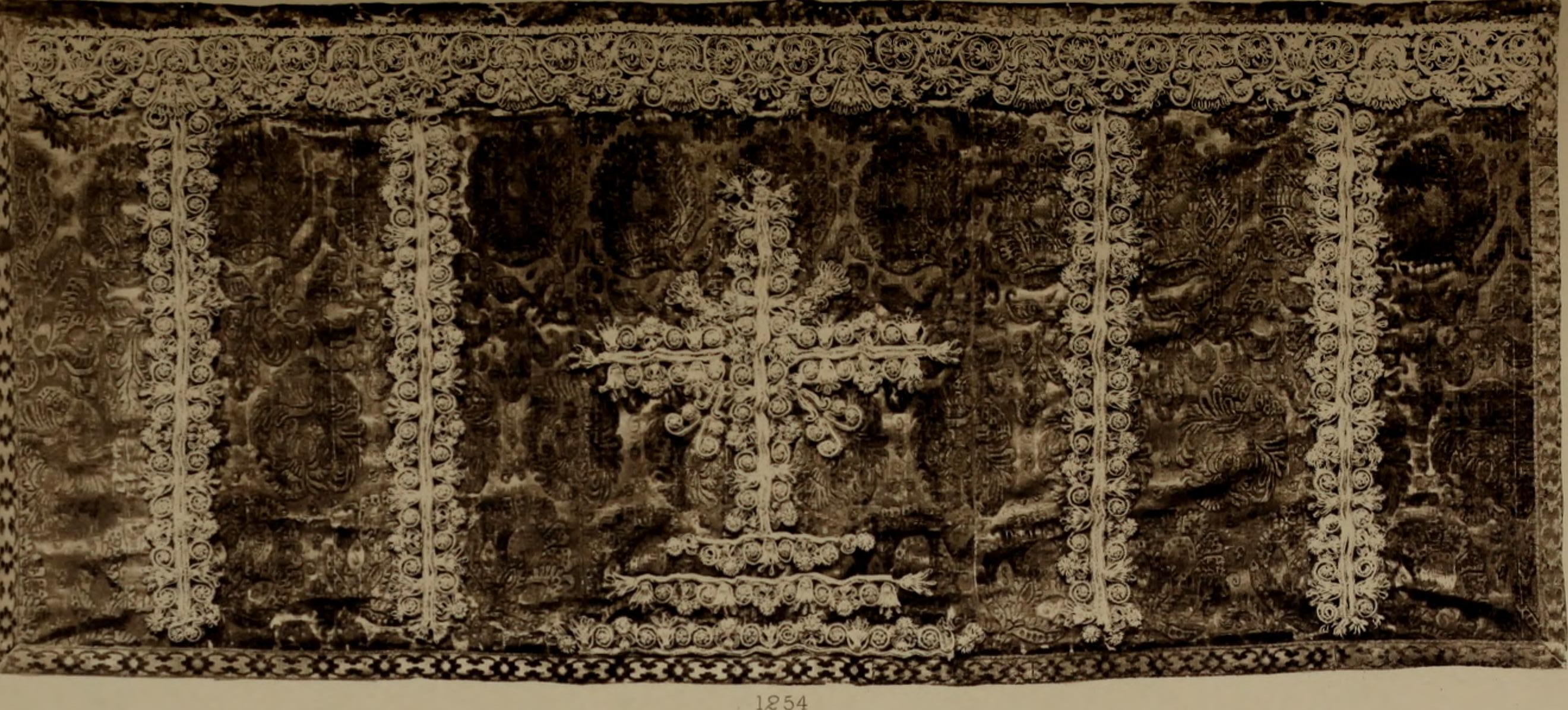

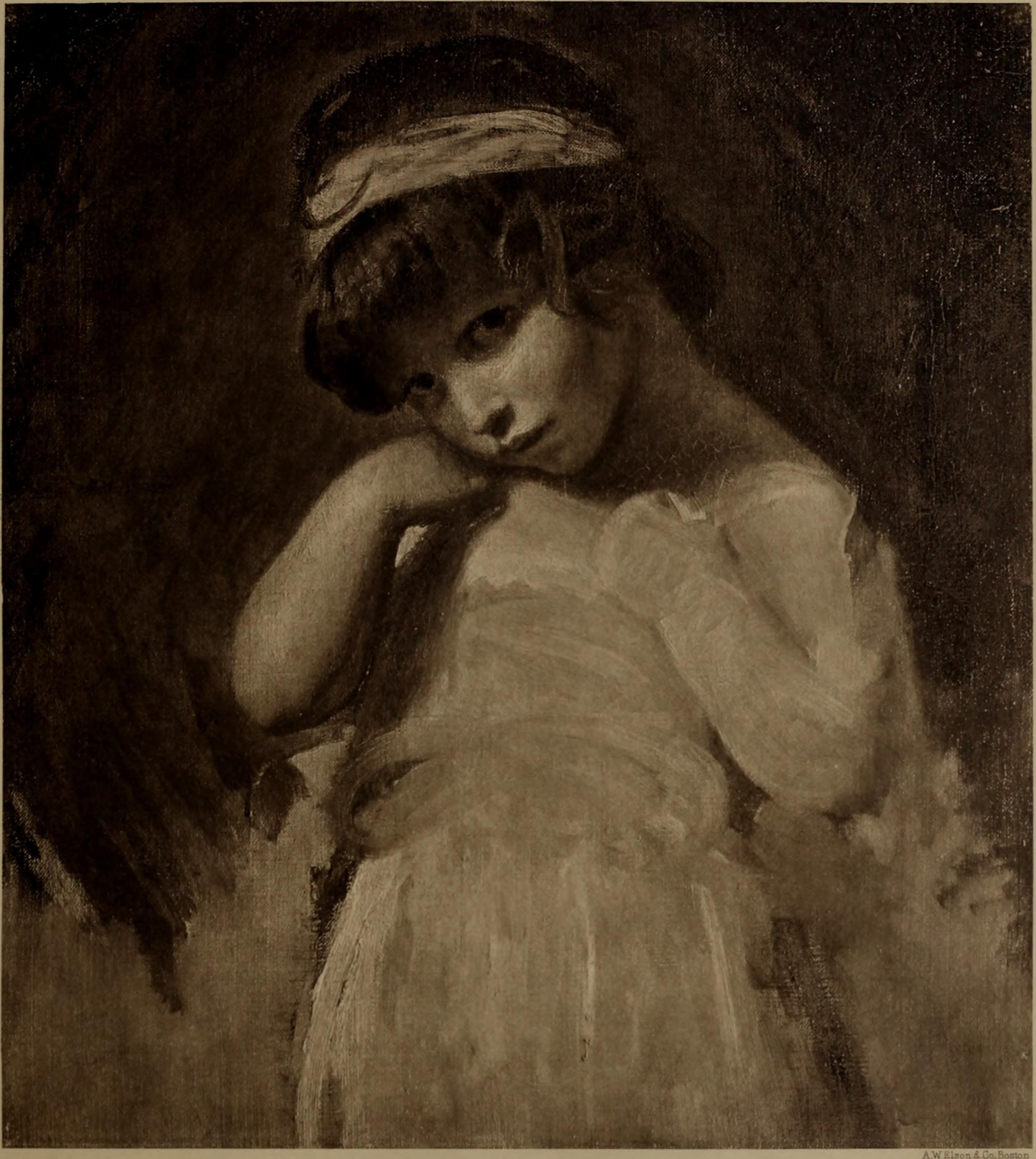
The Shy Child by George Romney (1790)

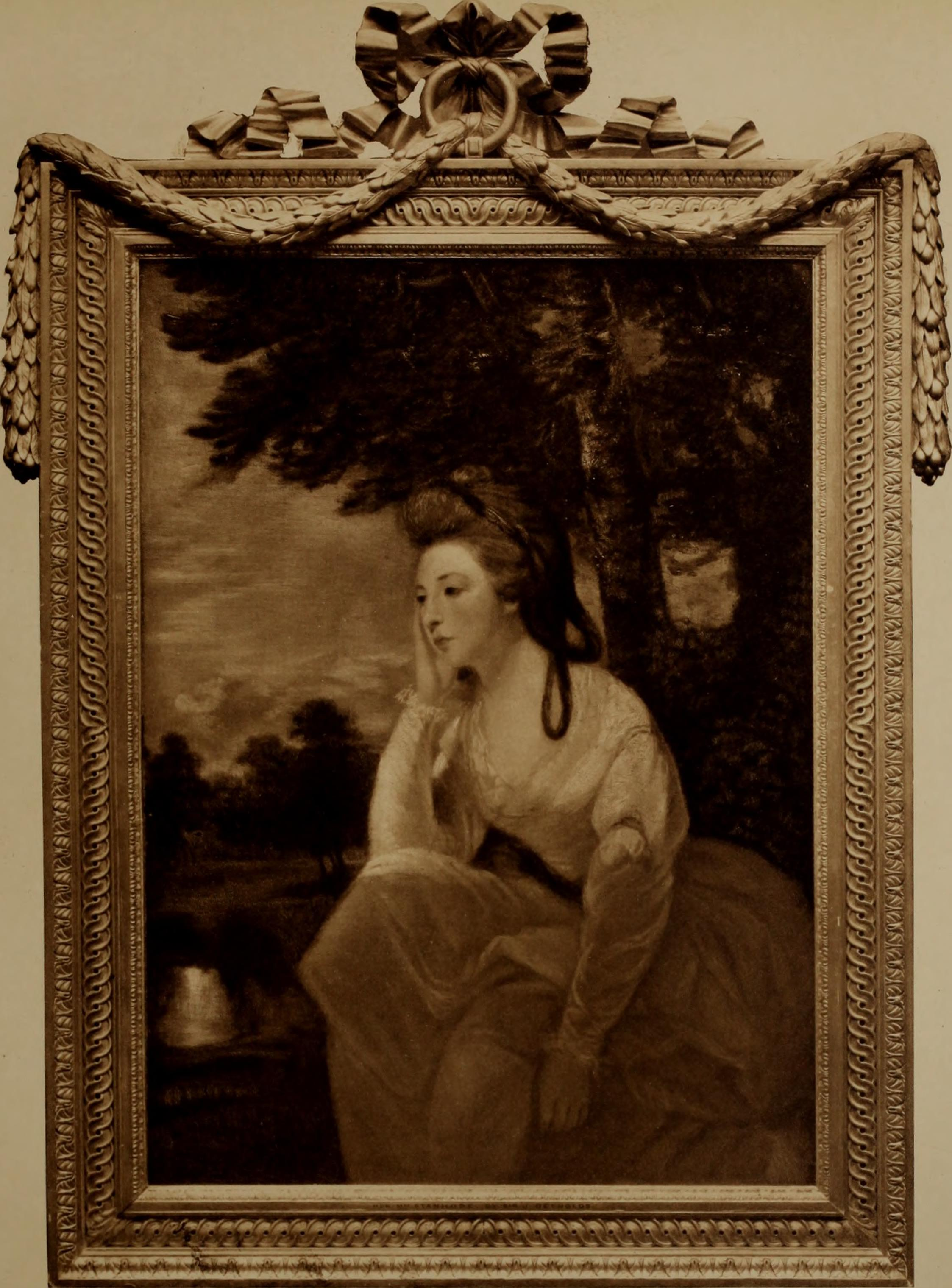
Hon. Mrs. Stanhope, print made by John Raphael Smith after Sir Joshua Reynolds

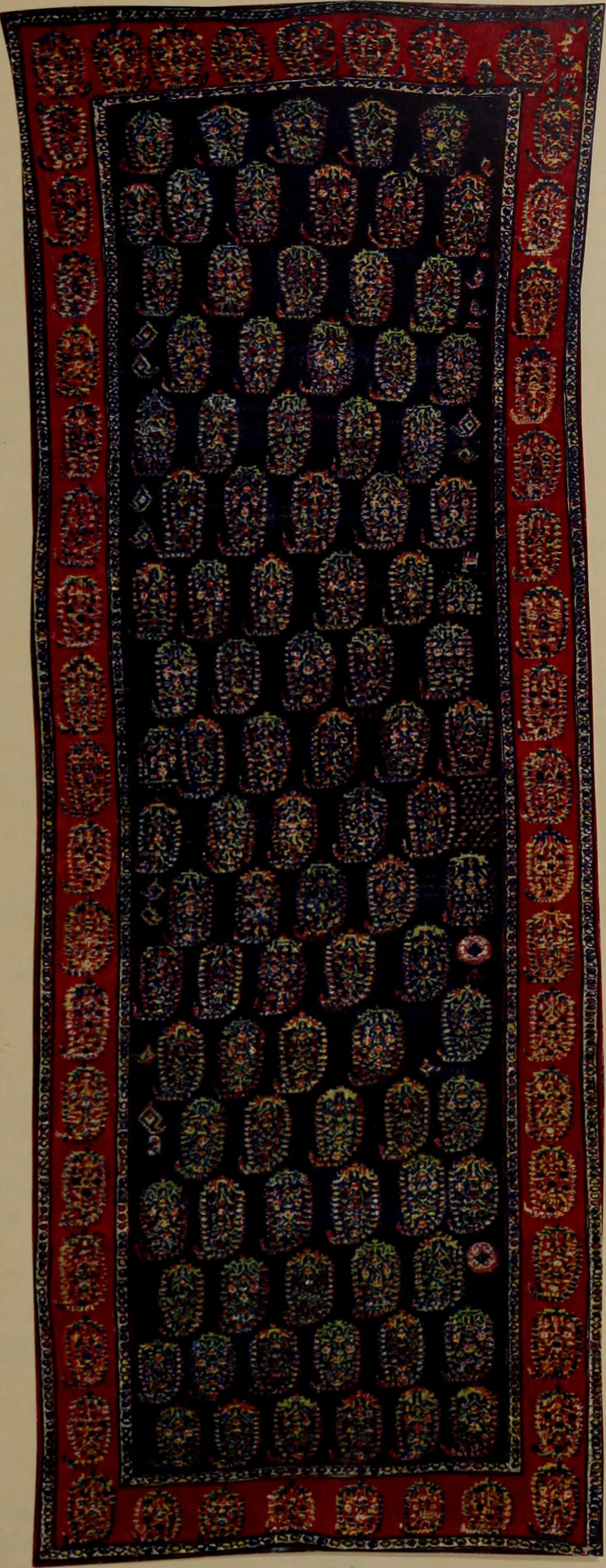

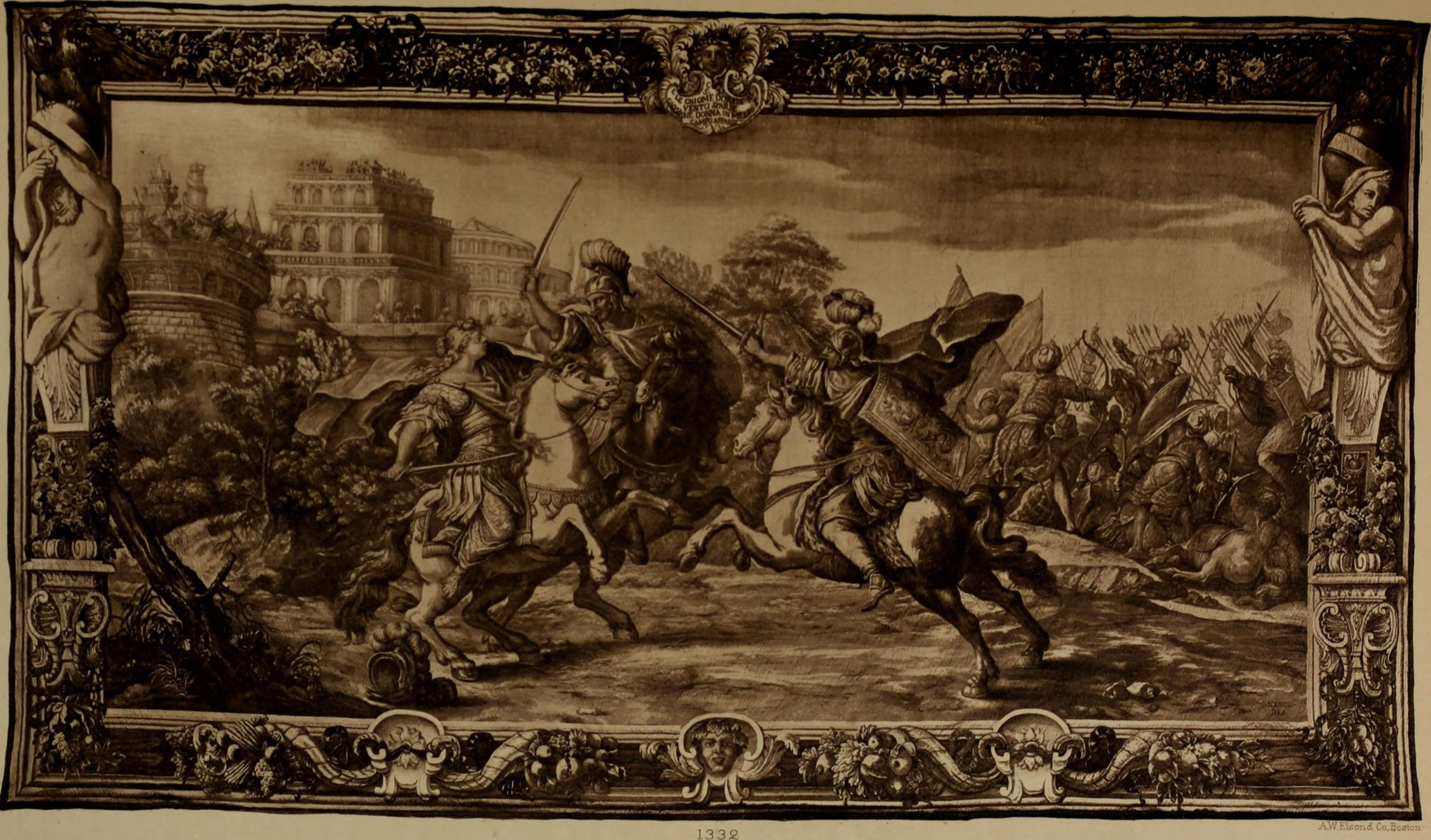
Gobelins tapestry (Louis XV period) (1735)

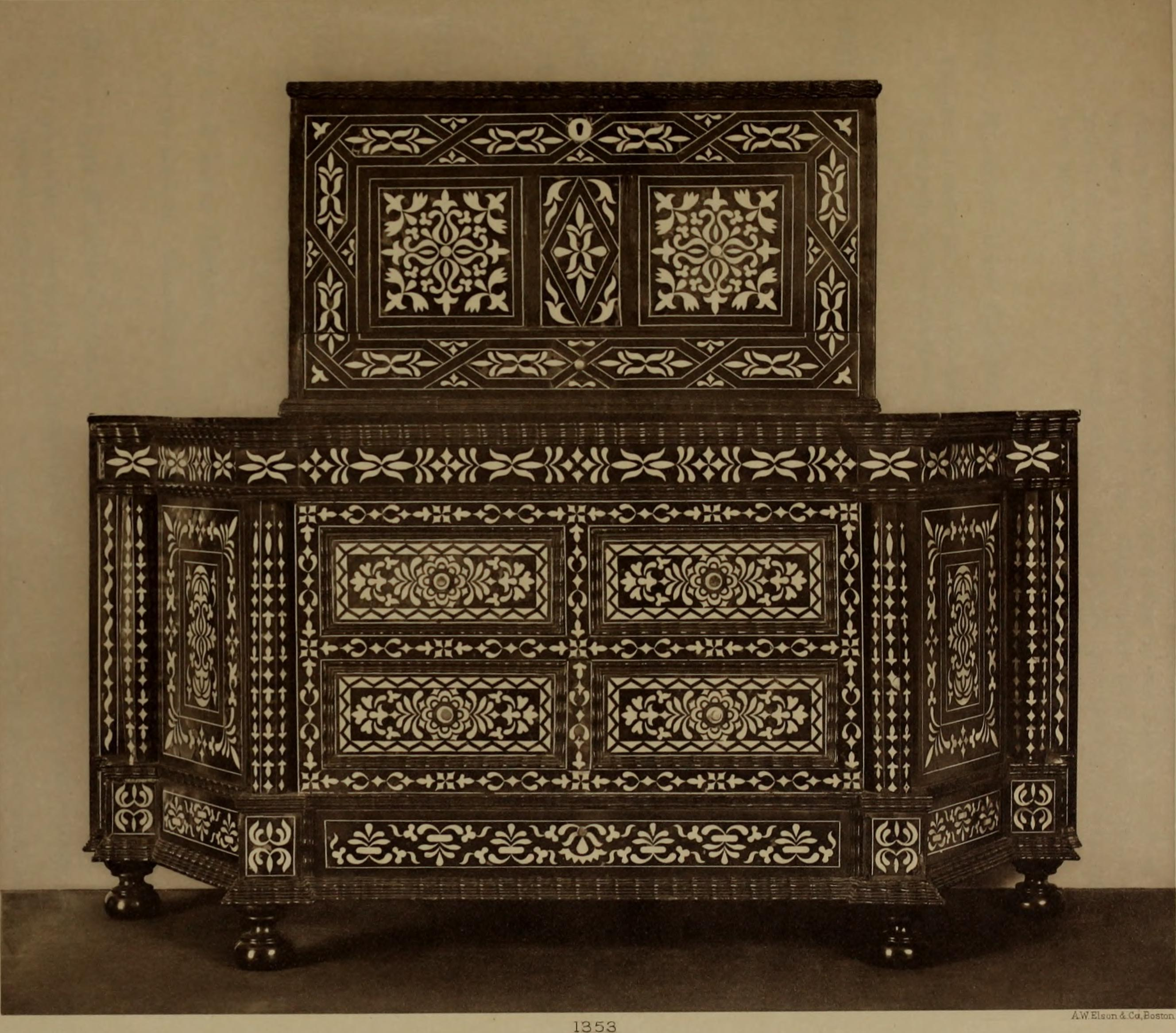
Wood and ivory corner cabinet

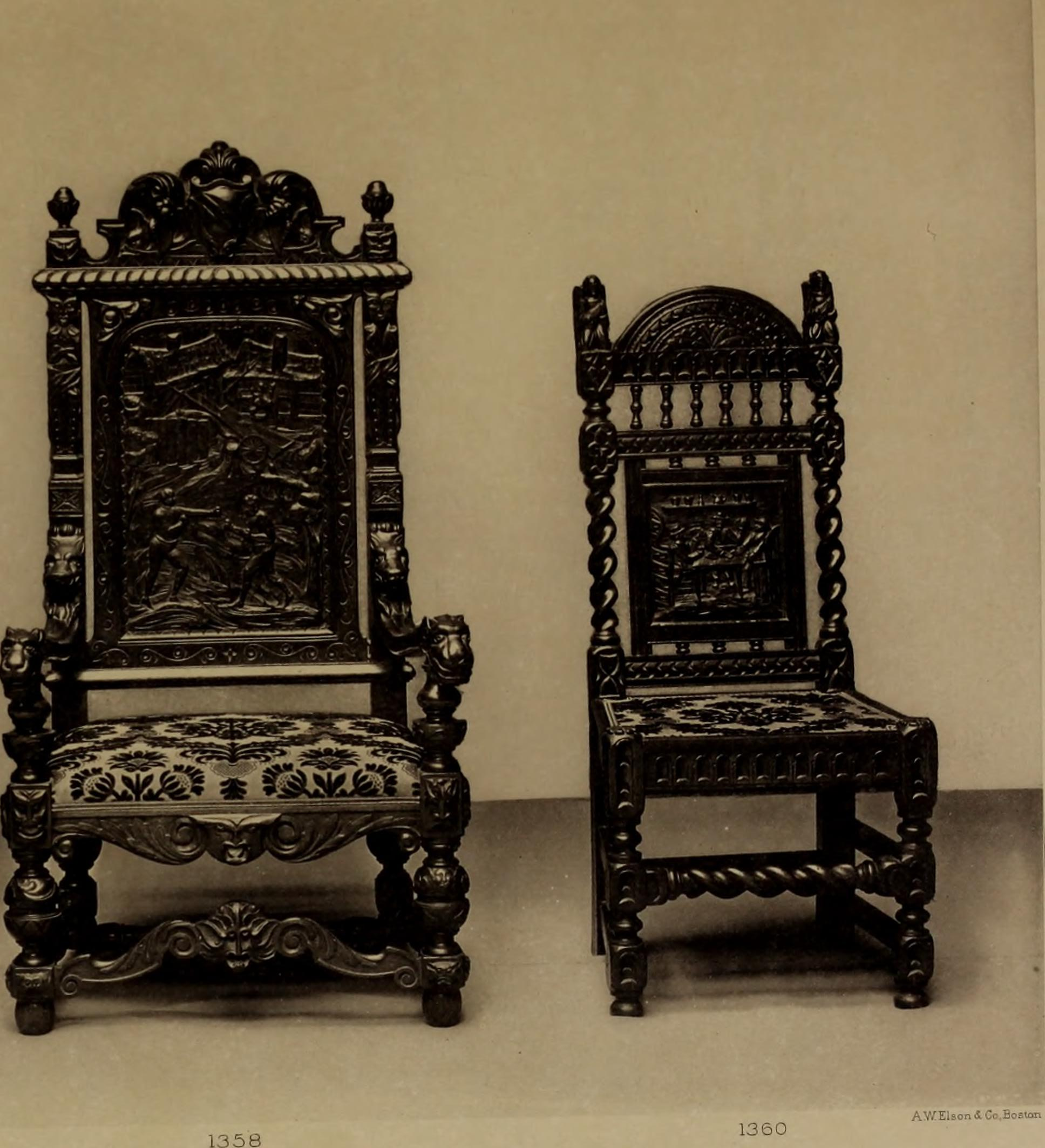
Large old English Hall armchair (one of two) and Old English high-backed char (one of four)

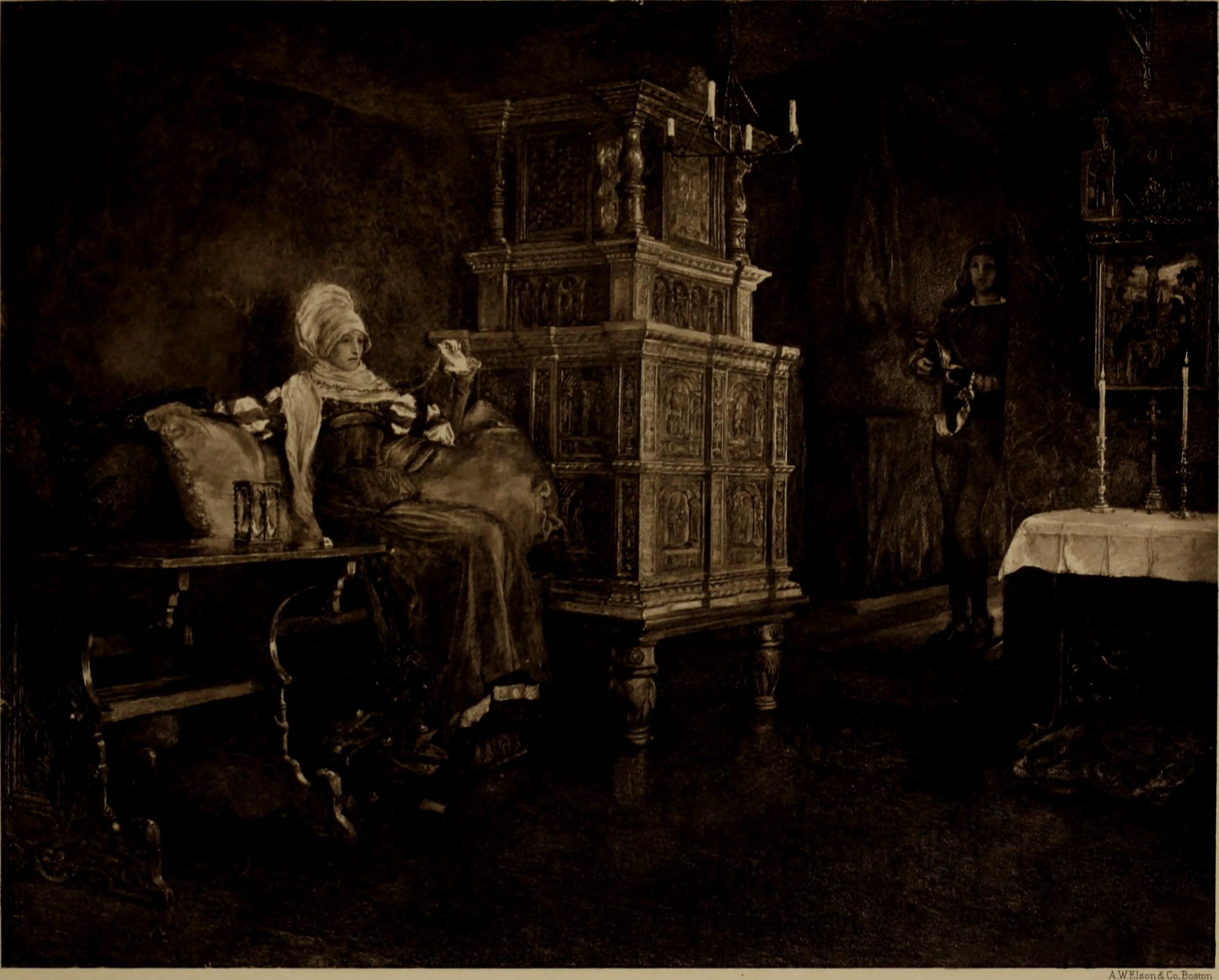
Mariana: Measure for Measure by Edwin Austin Abbey

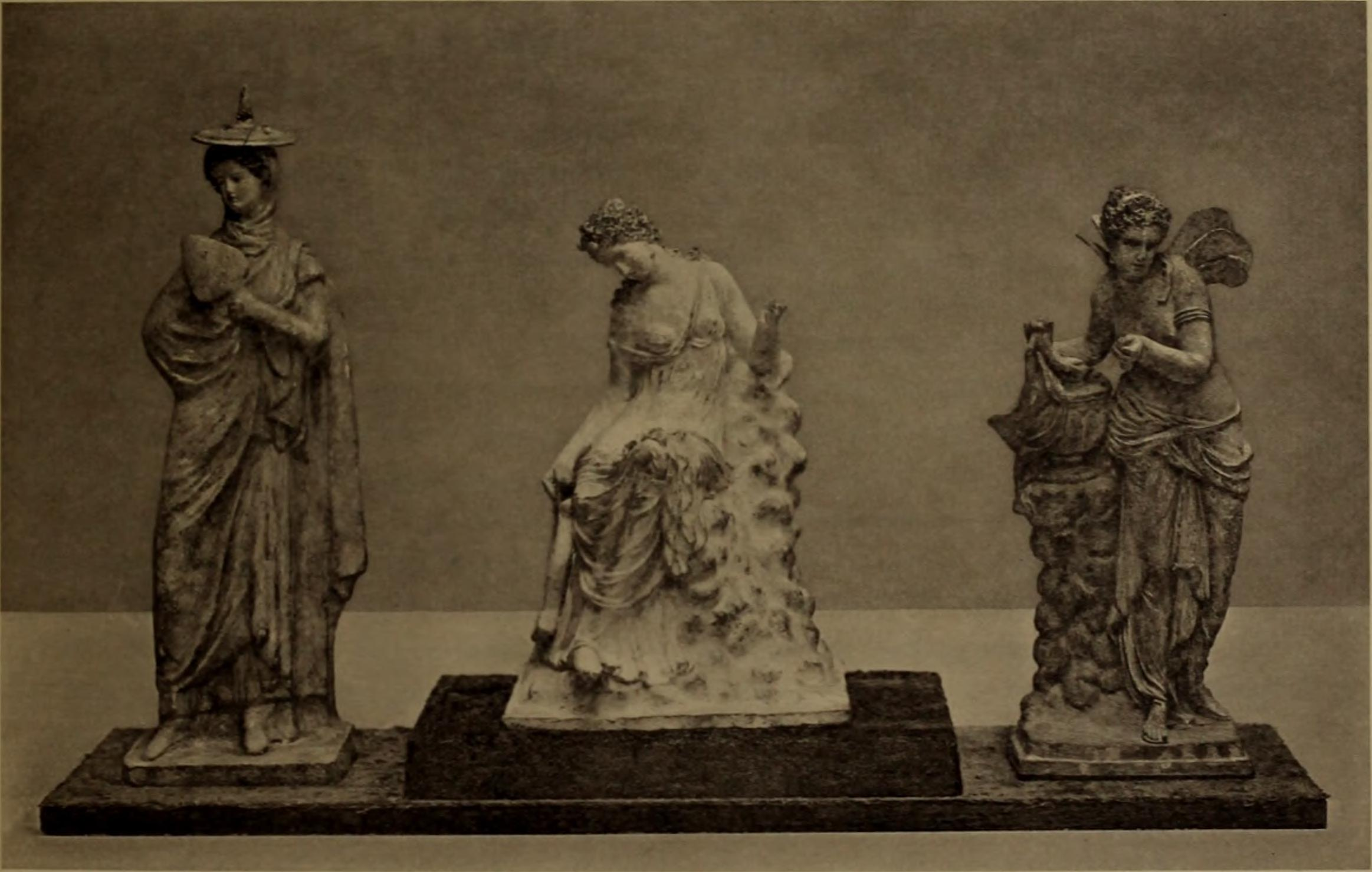

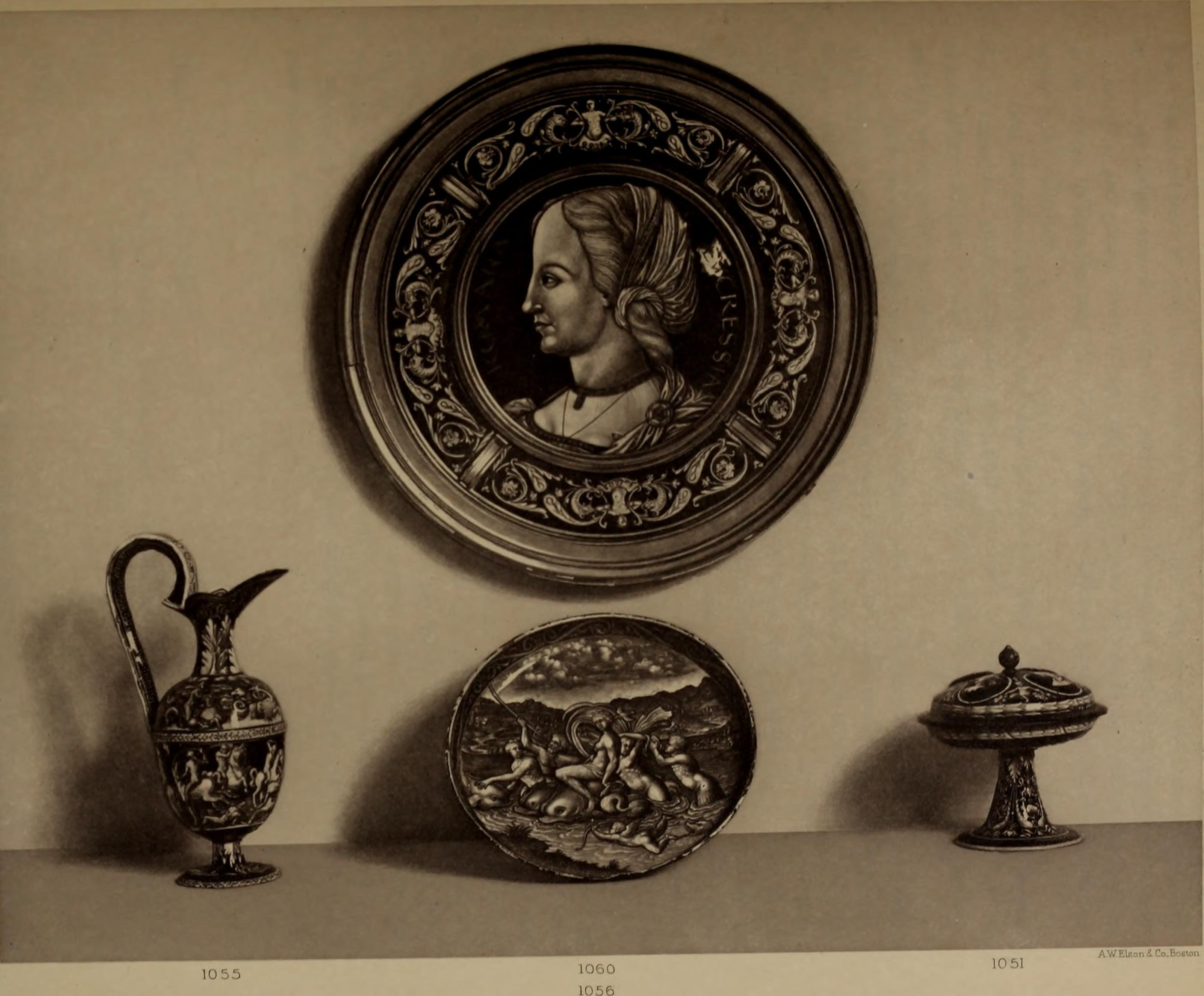

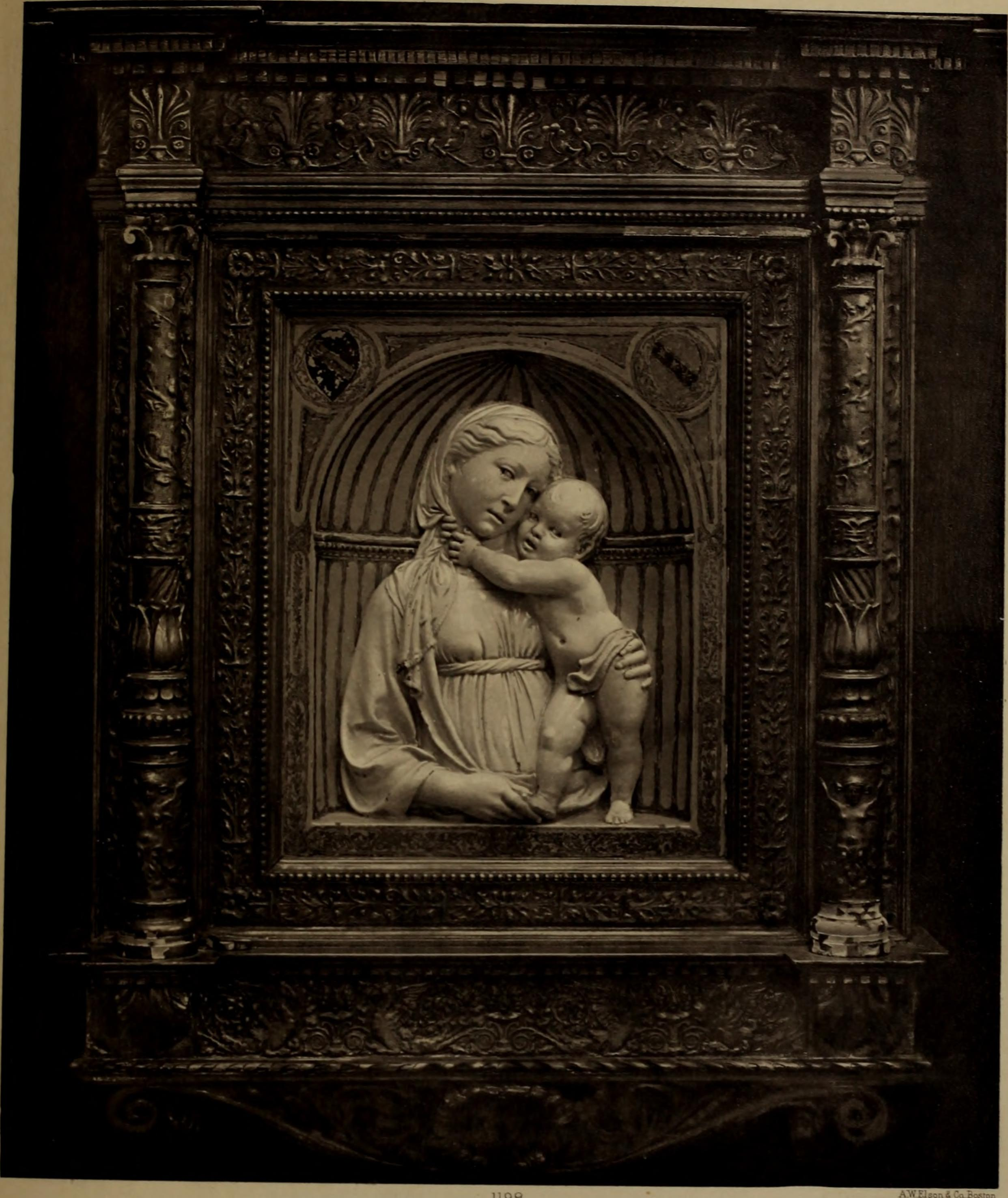
Madonna and child Luca della Robbia (15th century)

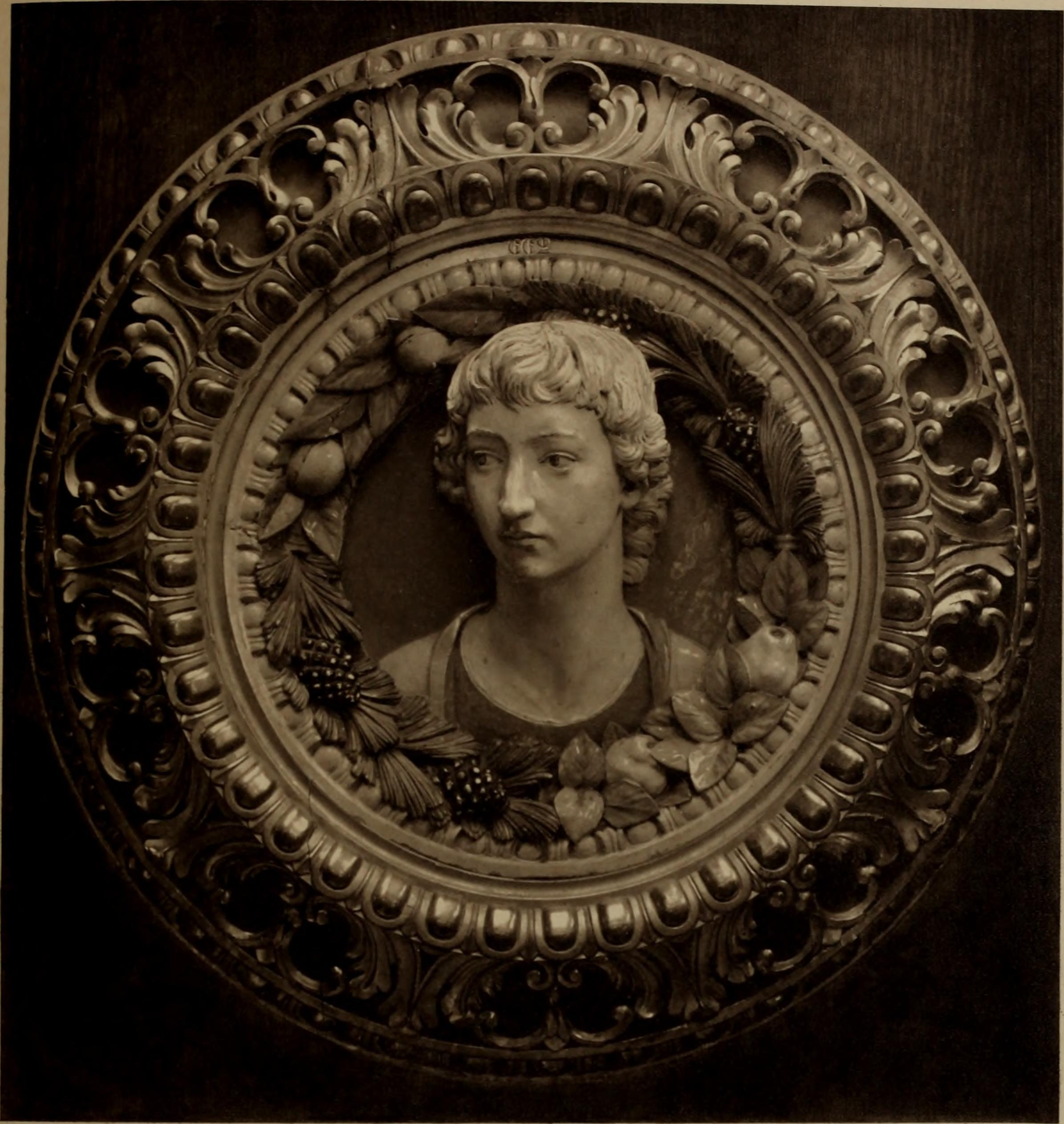

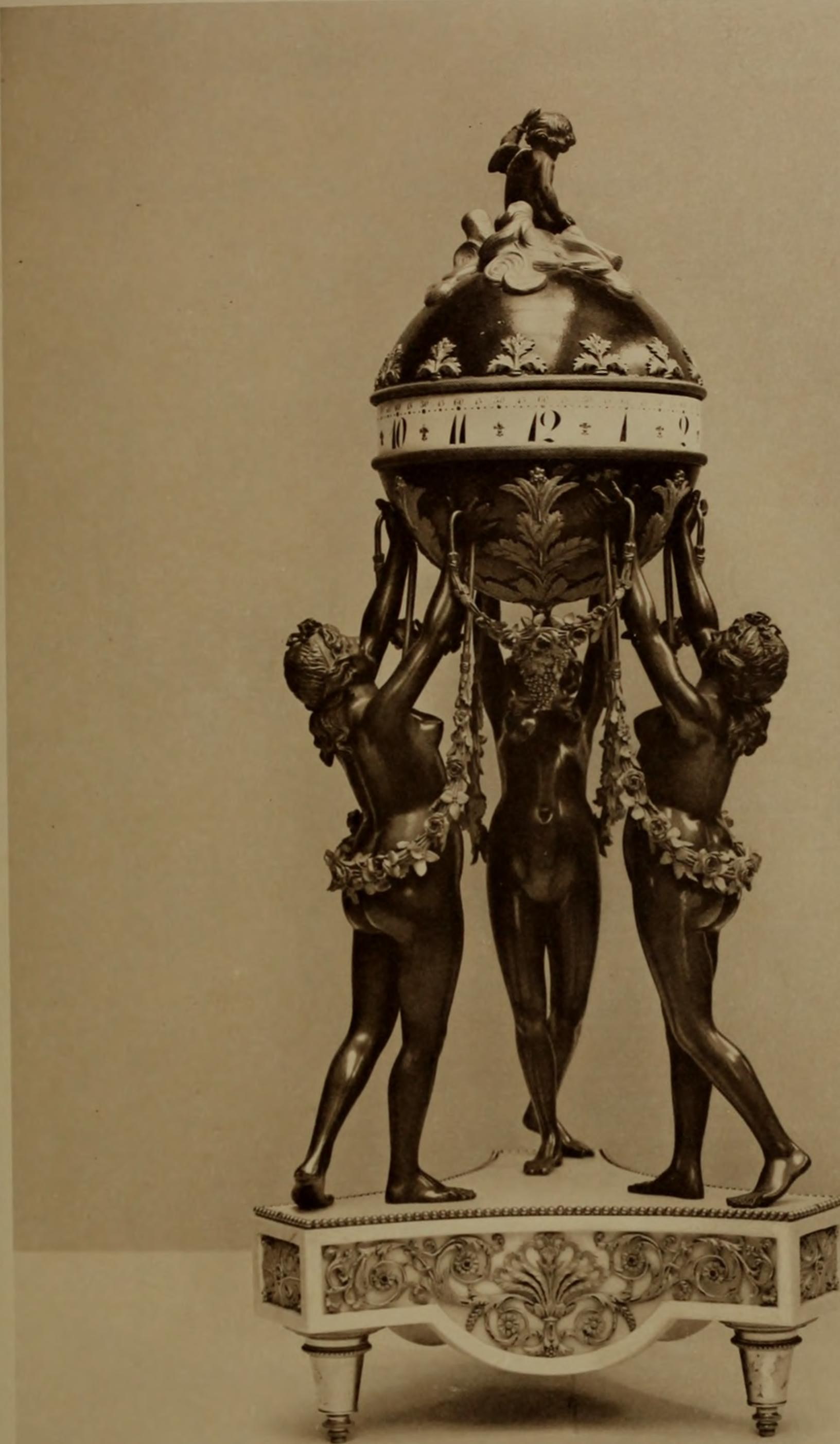

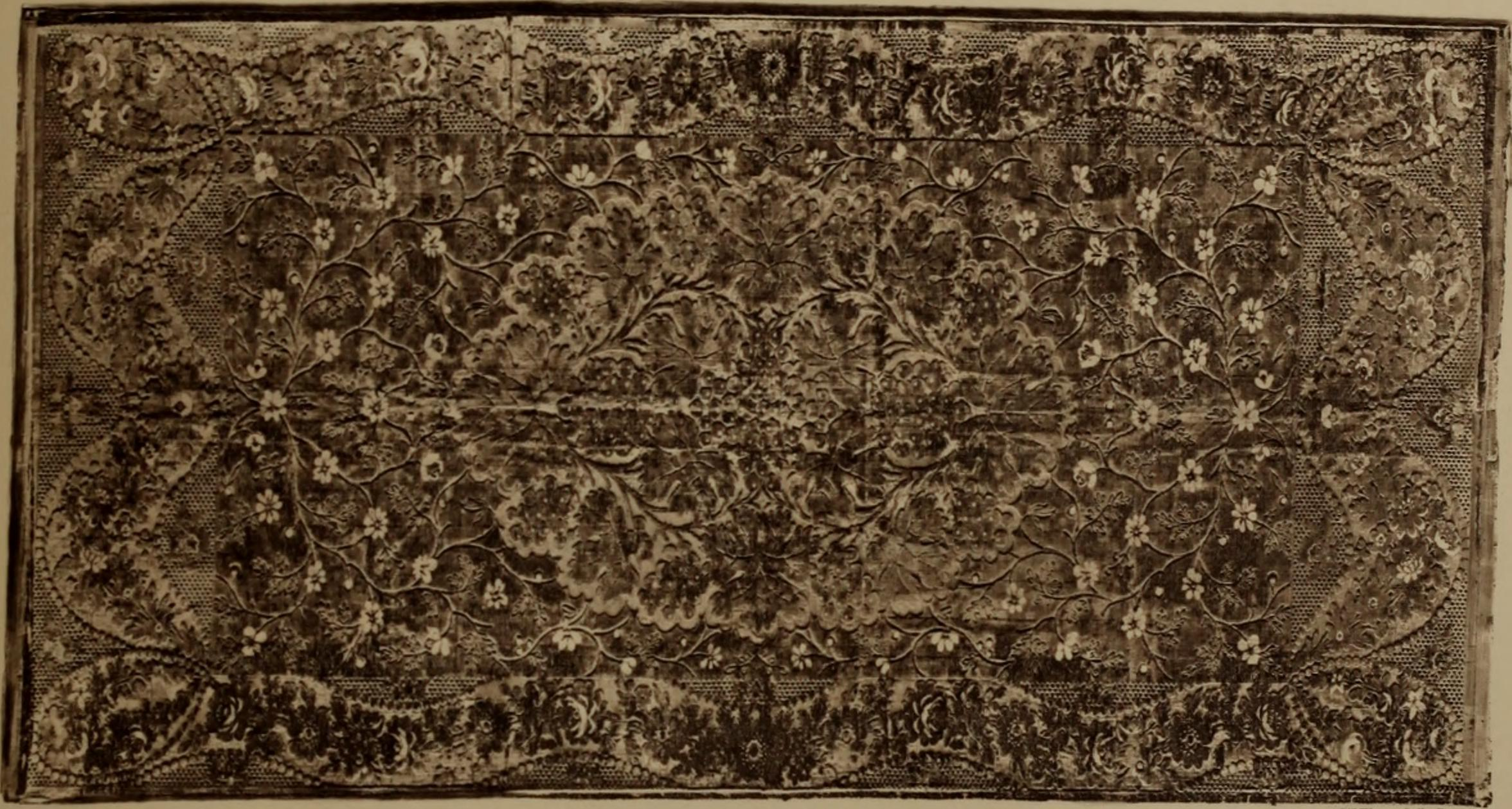

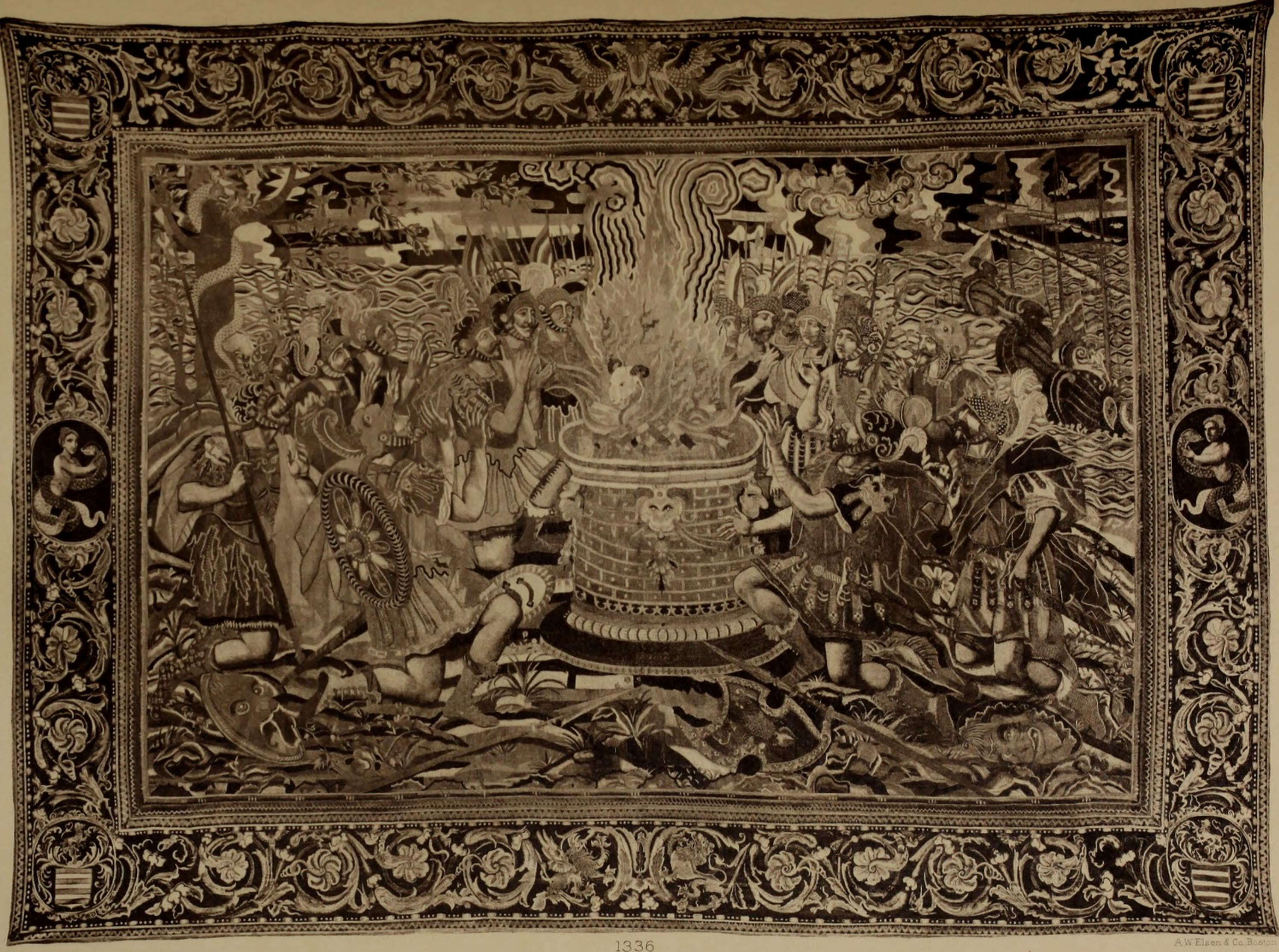

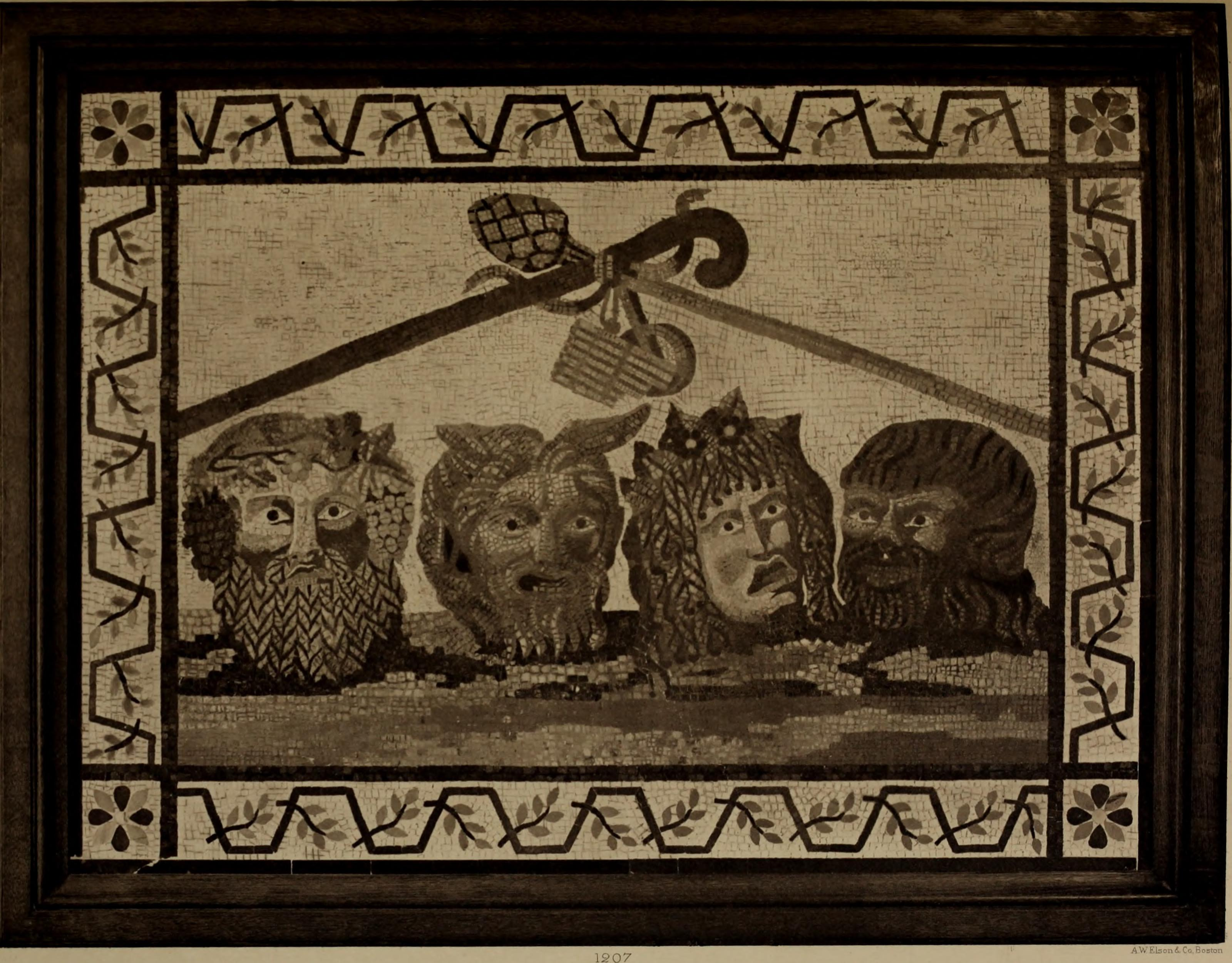

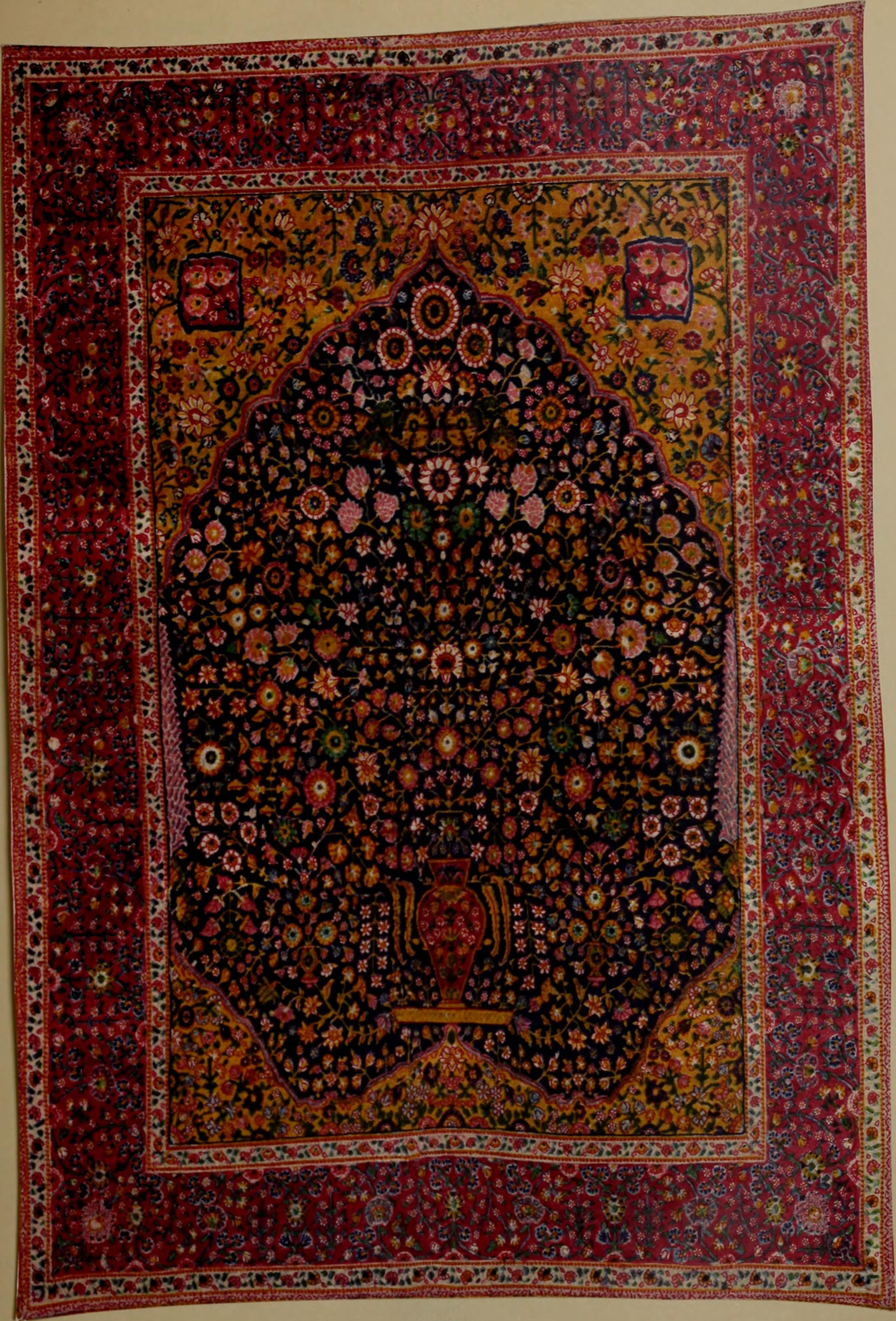
