= 1885 in art =

Events from the year 1885 in art.

== Events ==
- March 24 [O.S.] – Peter Carl Fabergé presents the first imperial Fabergé egg to Maria Feodorovna, wife of Alexander III of Russia, beginning an Easter tradition that continues until 1917.
- May 20 – A letter, "A Woman's Plea", published in The Times of London protests against the use of nude models in art. Signed "British Matron" it is in fact written by painter and senior Royal Academician John Callcott Horsley.
- June – Paul Gauguin returns to Paris from Copenhagen where he has been unsuccessful in reconciling with his wife.
- July 13 – New building for the Rijksmuseum in Amsterdam, designed by Pierre Cuypers, opens.
- Summer – Georges Seurat makes the first of his regular visits to paint on the Channel coast of France, this year at Grandcamp, where he paints the original version of Le Bec du Hoc, Grandchamp.
- August – First public display of works by Vincent van Gogh, in the windows of the art dealer Leurs at The Hague.
- "Glasgow Boys" first exhibit collectively, at the Glasgow Institute of the Fine Arts.
- Aberdeen Art Gallery opens in Scotland.
- Birmingham Museum and Art Gallery opens in England.
- The Guildhall Art Gallery opens in the City of London.
- The E. B. Crocker Art Gallery is presented to the people of Sacramento, California.
- The Opponenterna, a group of Swedish artists, demands that the Royal Swedish Academy of Fine Arts be modernized.

== Awards ==
- June 26 – John Everett Millais granted a baronetcy in the United Kingdom, the first artist to accept a hereditary title (G. F. Watts refuses for a second time).

== Works ==
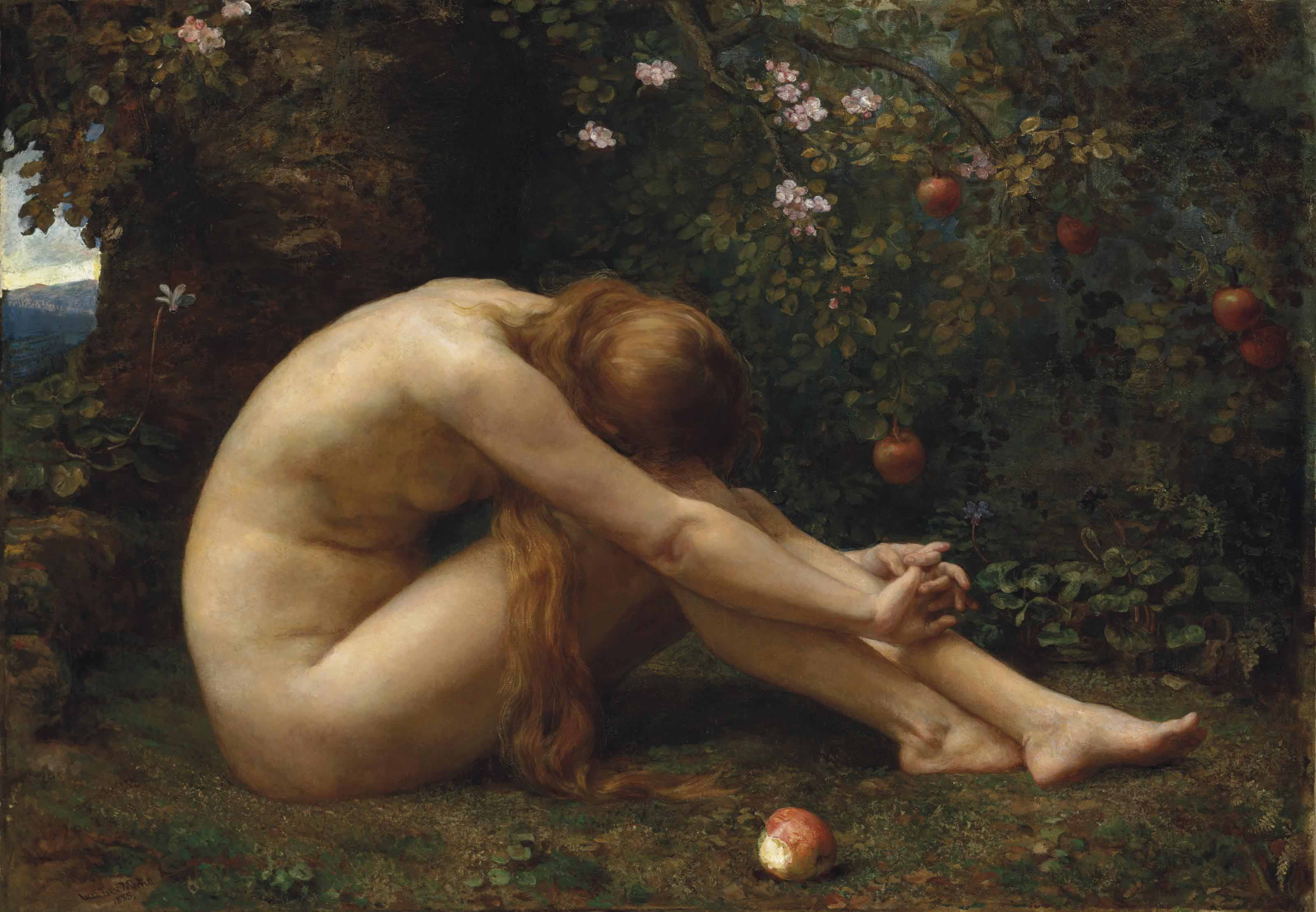
Eve Overcome with Remorse by Anna Lea Merritt

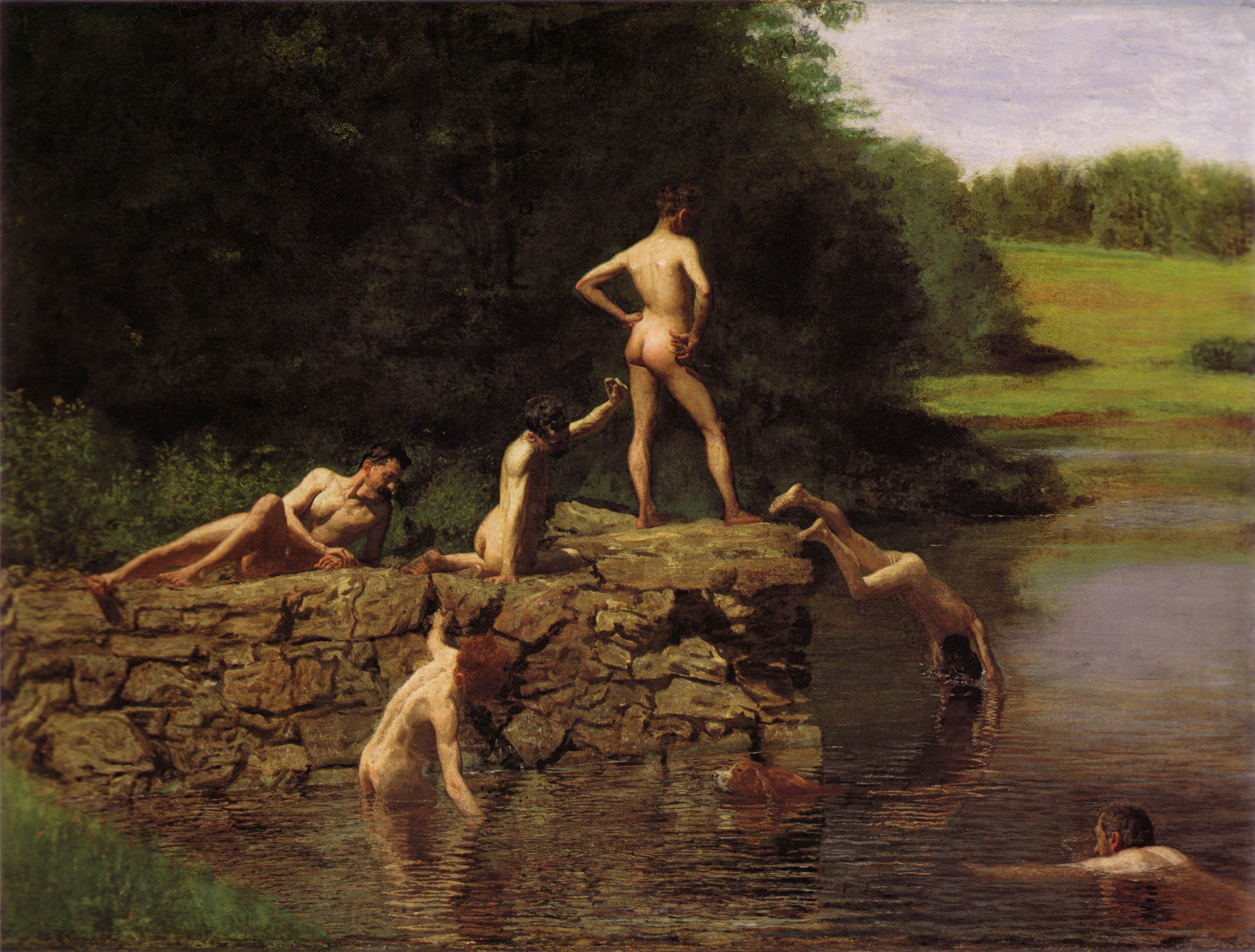
Thomas Eakins – The Swimming Hole

- Lawrence Alma-Tadema – A Reading from Homer
- Michael Ancher – Vil han klare pynten ("Will he Round the Point?")
- William-Adolphe Bouguereau – The Young Shepherdess
- Frank Bramley
  - Everyone His Own Tale
  - Primrose Day
- John Brett – The Norman Archipelago
- Ernest Christophe – La Fatalité (sculpture)
- John Collier – Circe
- Albert Dubois-Pillet (some dates approximate)
  - Ankerplaats
  - Bouquet of Roses in a Vase
  - Landscape with a Lock
  - Still Life with Fish
  - View of Paris
  - Winter Landscape
- Thomas Eakins – The Swimming Hole
- Albert Edelfelt – Portrait of Louis Pasteur
- Henri Fantin-Latour – Around the Piano
- Luke Fildes – Venetians
- Stanhope Forbes – A Fish Sale on a Cornish Beach
- Paul Gauguin
  - Self-portrait (Kimbell Art Museum, Fort Worth)
  - Women Bathing (Baigneuses à Dieppe)
- Jean-Léon Gérôme – The Great Bath at Bursa
- Frederick Goodall – The Finding of Moses
- Ellen Day Hale – Self-portrait (Museum of Fine Arts, Boston)
- Winslow Homer – The Fog Warning (Museum of Fine Arts, Boston)
- John Lavery – The Tennis Party
- Edwin Long – The Chosen Five
- Juan Luna
  - Chula series
  - Odalisque
- Jan Matejko – Bohdan Khmelnytsky with Tuhaj Bej near Lviv
- Anna Lea Merritt – Eve Overcome with Remorse
- John Everett Millais – The Ruling Passion
- Charles William Mitchell – Hypatia
- Claude Monet -
  - Meadow with Haystacks near Giverny
  - The Cliffs at Etretat
- Henri-Paul Motte – The Fiancee of Belus
- Ernest Normand – The Bitter Draught of Slavery
- Walter Osborne – Feeding the Chickens
- Anna Palm – A game of l'hombre in Brøndums Hotel
- Pierre-Auguste Renoir – Girl Braiding Her Hair (Suzanne Valadon)
- Ilya Repin – Ivan the Terrible and His Son Ivan, 16 November 1581 (Tretyakov Gallery, Moscow)
- Tom Roberts – Winter morning after rain, Gardiner's Creek (Art Gallery of South Australia)
- John Singer Sargent
  - Claude Monet Painting by the Edge of a Wood
  - Judith Gautier
  - Robert Louis Stevenson and his wife
- Therese Schwartze – Three girls from the Amsterdam Orphanage
- Pinckney Marcius-Simons - The Child Canova Modeling a Lion out of Butter (c.)
- Marie Spartali Stillman – Love's Messenger
- Marianne Stokes – Homeless
- James Tissot
  - The Bridesmaid
  - The Shop Girl
- William Greene Turner – Oliver Perry Monument (bronze, Newport, Rhode Island)
- Vincent van Gogh
  - The Potato Eaters (April)
  - Cottages series
  - Old Church Tower at Nuenen series (continued)
  - Peasant Character Studies
  - Still life paintings (continuing)
  - Two Paintings of Amsterdam (October)
- Hubert von Herkomer – Hard Times
- John William Waterhouse – Saint Eulalia
- George Frederic Watts
  - Love and Life
  - Mammon
  - The Minotaur
- W. L. Wyllie
  - A Dying Giant
  - Storm and Sunshine: A Battle with the Elements

== Births ==
- January 21 – Duncan Grant, Scottish painter (died 1978)
- February 18 – Henri Laurens, French sculptor (died 1954)
- February 24 – Stanisław Ignacy Witkiewicz ('Witkacy'), Polish painter, playwright and novelist (suicide 1939)
- March 3 – Cecil Thomas, English bronze sculptor and medallist (died 1976)
- March 31 – Pascin, Bulgarian-born painter and draftsman (suicide 1930)
- April 4 – Leonardo Dudreville, Italian painter (died 1975)
- April 8 – Norman Clyde, American mountaineer, nature photographer and naturalist (died 1972)
- April 12 – Robert Delaunay, French painter (died 1941)
- May 8 – Charles Walter Simpson, English painter of nature and teacher (died 1971)
- May 9 – Gianni Vella, Maltese painter and cartoonist (died 1977)
- May 12 – Mario Sironi, Italian painter (died 1961)
- June 27
  - Arthur Lismer, English-born Canadian painter, member of the Group of Seven (died 1969)
  - James Sleator, Irish painter (died 1950)
- July 5 – André Lhote, French painter and sculptor (died 1962)
- July 11 – Roger de La Fresnaye, French cubist painter (died 1925)
- July 15 – Josef Frank, Austrian-born architect and designer (died 1967)
- August 15 – Nancy Cox-McCormack, American portrait sculptor (died 1967)
- August 26 – Gwen Raverat, née Darwin, English wood engraver (died 1957)
- August 30 – Paul Gösch, German artist and architect (died 1940)
- September 9 – Clare Sheridan, English sculptor and author (died 1970)
- September 12 – Heinrich Hoffmann, German propaganda photographer (died 1957)
- October 15 – Jóhannes Sveinsson Kjarval, Icelandic painter (died 1972)
- October 21 – Jan Altink, Dutch painter (died 1971)
- November 14 – Sonia Delaunay, Ukrainian-French artist (died 1979)
- December 25 – Lucienne Heuvelmans, French sculptor (died 1944) (Note: Some conflicting sources state that she was born in 1881.)
- December 28 – Vladimir Tatlin, Russian painter and architect (died 1953)
- date unknown – Branko Radulović, Serbian painter (died 1916)

== Deaths ==
- January 20 – Joseph Niklaus Bütler, Swiss painter (born 1822)
- April 18 – Rudolf Eitelberger, Austrian art historian (born 1817)
- April 29 – Ernst Joachim Förster, German painter (born 1800)
- June 12 – Adolf Mosengel, German landscape painter (born 1837)
- June 13 – Carl Arnold Gonzenbach, Swiss painter (born 1806)
- July 23 – Pierre Alexandre Schoenewerk, French sculptor (born 1820)
- August 30 – Thomas Thornycroft, English sculptor (born 1815)
- September 6 – Narcís Monturiol, Spanish artist and engineer (born 1819)
- September 23 – Carl Spitzweg, German painter (born 1808)
- October 9 – John Bowes, English art collector (born 1811)
- December 5 – Wilhelm Ripe, German painter (born 1818)
- December 11 – James Fahey, English landscape painter (born 1804)
- December 30 – Martha Darley Mutrie, British painter (born 1824)
- date unknown – Girolamo Masini, Italian sculptor (born 1840)
