= Chula =

Chula may refer to:

== Thailand ==
- Chulalongkorn (Rama V, 1853–1910), Siamese King
- Chula Chakrabongse (1908–1963), Siamese Prince
- Chulalongkorn University, Bangkok, Thailand
  - Maha Chulalongkorn ("Great Chulalongkorn"), Chulalongkorn University anthem composed by King Bhumibol Adulyadej
- Chularatchamontri, Thai Shaykh al-Islām

== Places ==
- Chula, Missouri
- Chula, Georgia
- Chula, Virginia
- Chula, Somalia
- Chula Vista, California

== Characters ==
- Chula the Tarantula, a character from the TV series Fievel's American Tails, originally introduced in the film An American Tail: Fievel Goes West
- Chula, a species in the Doctor Who universe
- Chula, a martial arts student in the Bond film, The Man with the Golden Gun

== Other uses ==
- Chula (Star Trek), a dice-based Wadi game in the Star Trek universe
- Chula (dessert), a typical dessert of region of Galicia, in Spain
- Chula (music), a Portuguese and Afro-Brazilian style of music and dance (see also Chula at Portuguese Wikipedia)
- "Chula" (song), by Grupo Firme and Demi Lovato
- Chula series, paintings about the working-class women of Madrid by Filipino painter and hero Juan Luna
- chuLa, a Japanese idol group

== See also ==
- Chula Vista
