= 1957 in art =

Events from the year 1957 in art.

== Events ==
- April 19 – Picasso is introduced by American photographer David Douglas Duncan to his dachshund Lump who becomes Picasso's companion and subject in paintings.
- May 17 – First known instance of a chimpanzee (Congo) painting. His mentor Desmond Morris organises an exhibition of chimpanzee art at the Institute of Contemporary Arts in London.
- Hungarian National Gallery opens in Buda Castle, Budapest.
- Gruppe SPUR, an artistic collaboration, is founded in Germany.
- Chicago's Lithuanian community opens the Čiurlionis Art Gallery.
- John Lennon enrols at Liverpool College of Art where he will meet Stuart Sutcliffe.
- Man Ray's Object to Be Destroyed (1923) is destroyed
- Three new neo-grotesque sans-serif typefaces are released: Folio (designed by Konrad Bauer and Walter Baum), Neue Haas Grotesk (designed by Max Miedinger) and Univers (designed by Adrian Frutiger); all will be influential in the International Typographic Style of graphic design.

== Awards ==
- Archibald Prize: Ivor Hele – Self Portrait
- John Moores Painting Prize: Jack Smith – Creation and Crucifixion

== Exhibitions ==
- January – Yves Klein – Proposte Monochrome, Epoca Blu ("Proposition Monochrome; Blue Epoch"), Gallery Apollinaire, Milan.

== Works ==
- Arman - Mauve Administratif
- Jean Arp – Evocation of a Form: Human, Lunar, Spectral (cast bronze)
- Maurice Boitel – The Hens
- Paul-Émile Borduas – Étoile noire
- Arthur Boyd – Dreaming Bridegroom 1
- Yves Klein – Aerostatic Sculpture (Paris).
- L. S. Lowry – Man Lying on a Wall; Portrait of Ann
- Isamu Noguchi – Endless Coupling
- Pablo Picasso – Las Meninas
- Charles Sheeler – Red Against White
- Clyfford Still – 1957-D No. 1

== Births ==
- January 27 – Frank Miller, American comic-book artist
- February 26 – Ben Garrison, American political cartoonist
- April 3 – Yves Chaland, French cartoonist (d. 1990)
- May 4 – John Akomfrah, Ghanaian-born British filmmaker
- July 31 – Martin Jennings, English figurative sculpture
- August 7 – Mark Bagley, American comic-book artist
- August 9 – Rick Leonardi, American comic-book illustrator
- August 28 – Ai Weiwei, Chinese installation artist
- October 16 – Jim Hodges, American installation artist
- November 18 – Ernst Billgren, Swedish sculptor
- November 26 – Félix González-Torres, Cuban artist (d. 1996)
- undated
  - Bill Barker, American Schwa conceptual artist
  - Mike Bernard, English painter and multi-media artist
  - Wang Jiujiang, Chinese neo-shan shui artist

== Deaths ==
- January 1 – Óscar Domínguez, Spanish painter (b. 1906)
- January 13? – Saishū Onoe, Japanese poet and calligrapher (b. 1876)
- January 17 – Jože Plečnik, Slovene architect (b. 1872)
- January 20 – John Minton, English painter and illustrator (suicide) (b. 1917)
- February 4 – Miguel Covarrubias, Mexican painter and caricaturist (b. 1904)
- February 11 – Gwen Raverat, English wood engraver (b. 1885)
- February 14 – Emanuel Hahn, German Canadian sculptor (b. 1881)
- March 16 – Constantin Brâncuși, Romanian-born sculptor (b. 1876)
- March 28 – Jack Butler Yeats, Irish painter and illustrator (b. 1871)
- March 23 – Andrzej Wróblewski, Polish figurative painter (mountaineering accident) (b. 1927)
- May 14 – Marie Vassilieff, Russian-born painter (b. 1884)
- May 18 – Bruce Rogers, American book designer and typographer (b. 1870)
- June 12 – Mario Urteaga Alvarado, Peruvian painter (b. 1875)
- July 7 – Kiyoshi Koishi, Japanese photographer (b. 1908)
- August 2 – Lasar Segall, Lithuanian-born Brazilian Jewish painter (b. 1891)
- August 15 – C. T. Loo, Chinese-born art dealer (b. 1880)
- August 19 – David Bomberg, English painter (b. 1890)
- September 13 – Adam Emory Albright, American painter of figures in landscapes (b. 1862)
- September 26 – Pompeo Coppini, Italian American sculptor (b. 1870)
- October 11 – René Auberjonois, Swiss Post-Impressionist painter (b. 1872)
- October 15 – Henry van de Velde, Belgian-born painter, architect and designer, a founder of the Art Nouveau movement (b. 1863)
- October 24 – Christian Dior, French fashion designer (b. 1905)
- November 2 – Mahonri Young, American sculptor (d. 1877)
- November 20 – Mstislav Dobuzhinsky, Russian-born graphic artist (b. 1875)
- November 24 – Diego Rivera, Mexican painter (b. 1886)
- November 30 – Paja Jovanović, a leading Serbian Realist painter (along with Đorđe Krstić and Uroš Predić) (b. 1859)
- December 14 – Josef Lada, Czech illustrator and painter (b. 1887)
- December 15 – Heinrich Hoffmann, German propaganda photographer (b. 1885)

== See also ==
- 1957 in Fine Arts of the Soviet Union
