= Schwa (disambiguation) =

In phonetics, schwa is the mid central vowel (transcribed [ə]) or similar neutral vowel.

Schwa may also refer to:

== Typography and writing ==
- Schwa (Cyrillic), a letter of some Cyrillic-based alphabets
- Ə, a letter used in some Latin-derived alphabets
- Shva or shĕwa, a Hebrew diacritic
- Shva, or Yn, an additional letter in the Georgian alphabet

== Other uses ==
- Schwa (art), an underground conceptual artwork of Bill Barker
- Schwa (restaurant), an eatery in Chicago, Illinois, United States
