= Around the Piano =

Painting by Henri Fantin-Latour

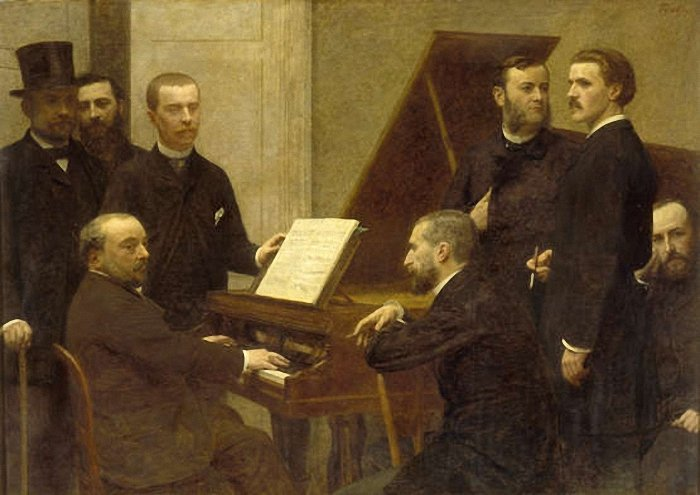
- Artist: Henri Fantin-Latour
- Year: 1885
- Type: oil painting
- Dimensions: 160 cm × 220 cm (63 in × 87 in)
- Location: Musée d'Orsay, Paris

Around the Piano (French: Autour du piano) is an oil-on-canvas painting by French artist Henri Fantin-Latour, executed in 1885. It was exhibited at the Paris Salon the same year, then was bought by Adolphe Jullien. In 1915, it was given to the Musée du Luxembourg, then was at the Musée du Louvre until 1986. It is currently kept at the Musée d'Orsay in Paris.

== Background and reception ==
The painting was the last of the four portraits of groups that Fantin-Latour devoted to his friends and celebrities in the arts world. He referred here to the concerts given by the group known as "Le Petit Bayreuth" initiated by Antoine Lascoux. Around the Piano received more critical acclaim than his previous works, but remains the least known of his series of four group portraits, perhaps because the people depicted are less famous.

Exhibited at the Salon of 1885, the painting was called The Wagnerists by visitors, as the person seated at the piano was thought to be Camille Saint-Saëns, a composer who was an early supporter of Wagner. Adolphe Jullien, a close friend of Latour, rejected this name, saying that Fantin did not want to paint an artistic manifesto, but simply a gathering of friends, and that the score on the piano, although indistinct, was a piece by Brahms.

== Description ==
Eight men are depicted around a piano, from left to right:

- Seated: Emmanuel Chabrier playing the piano, Edmond Maître and Amédée Pigeon
- Standing: Adolphe Jullien, Arthur Boisseau, Camille Benoît, Antoine Lascoux and Vincent d'Indy
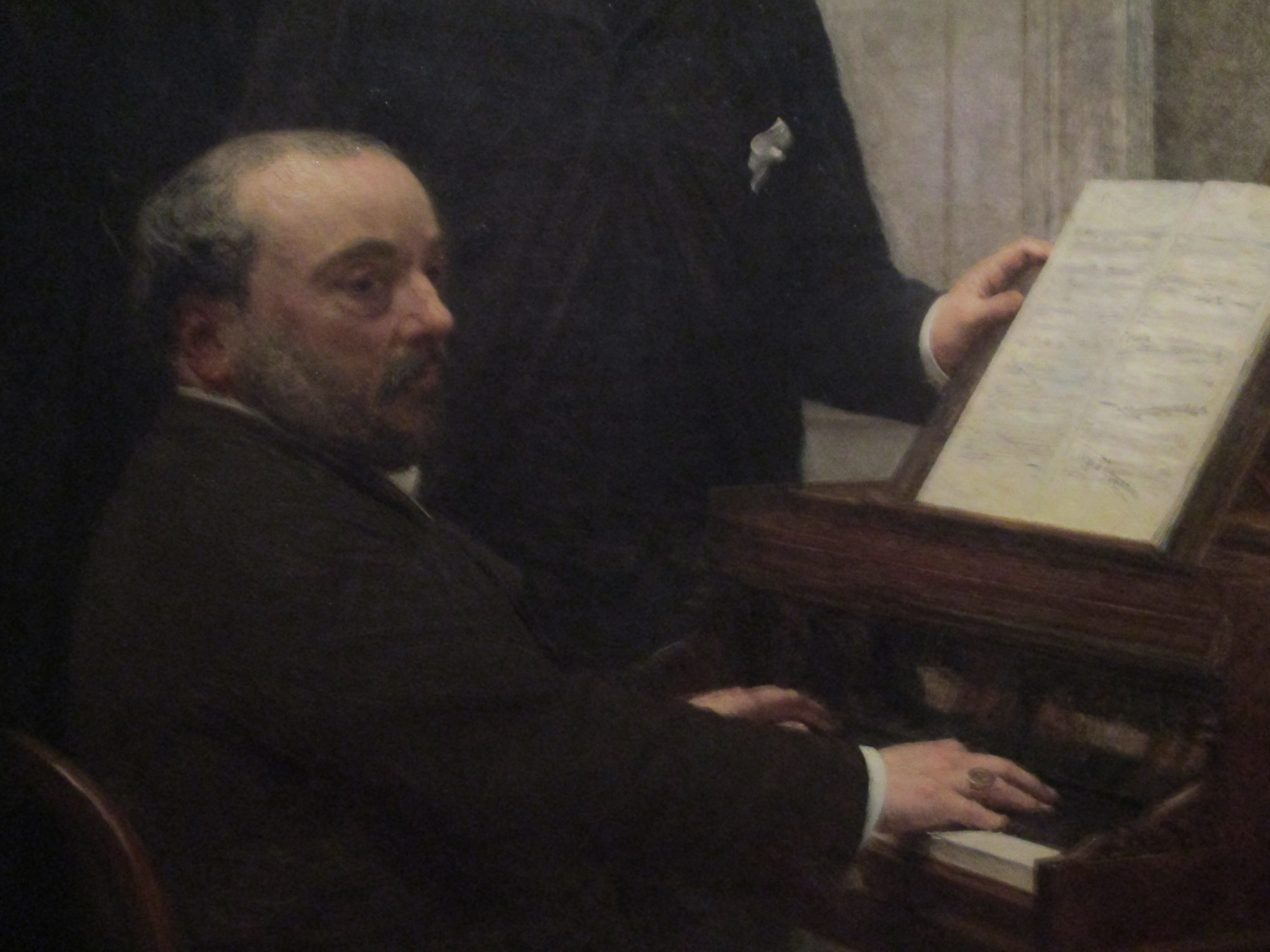
Emmanuel Chabrier

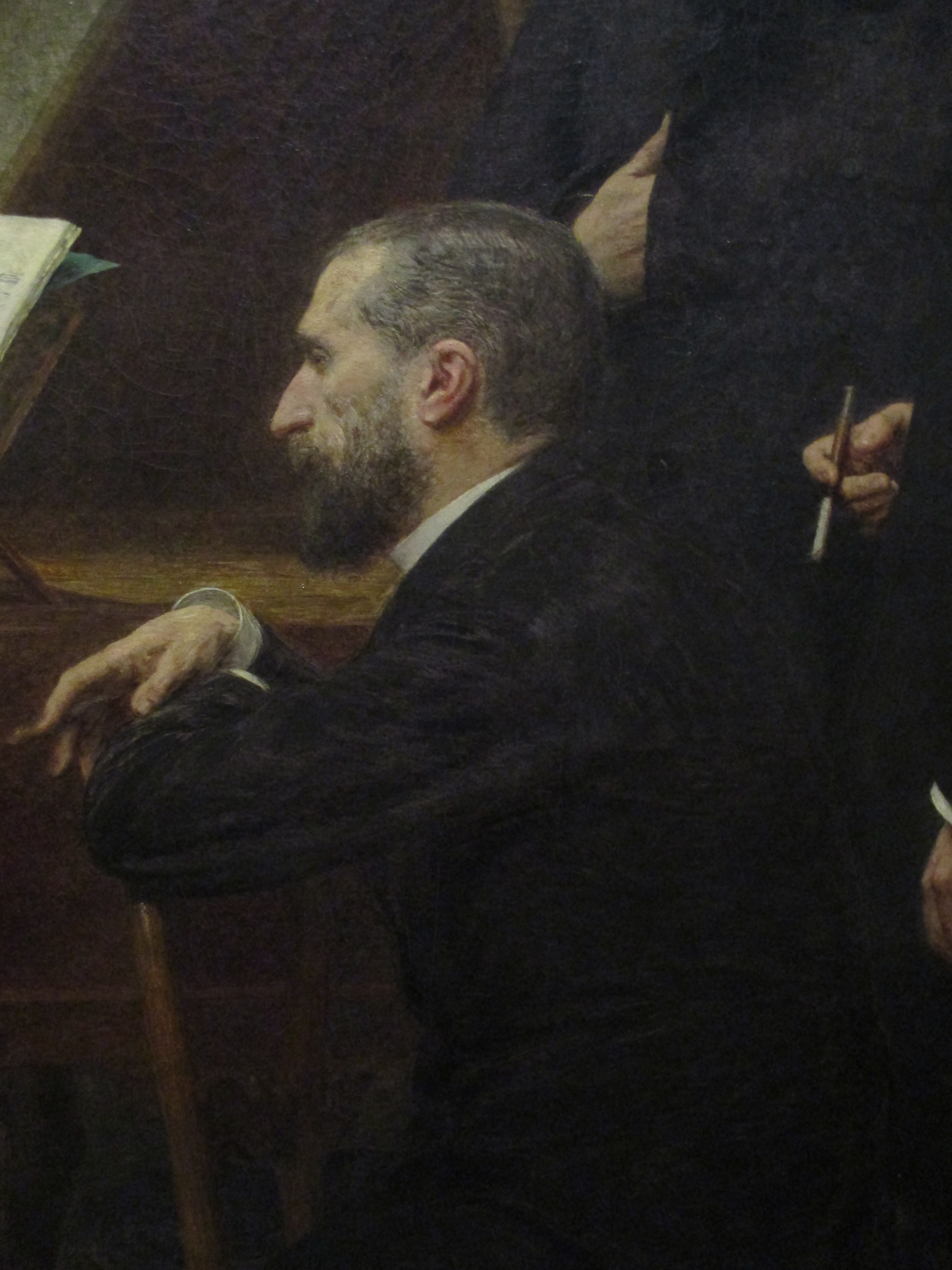
Edmond Maître

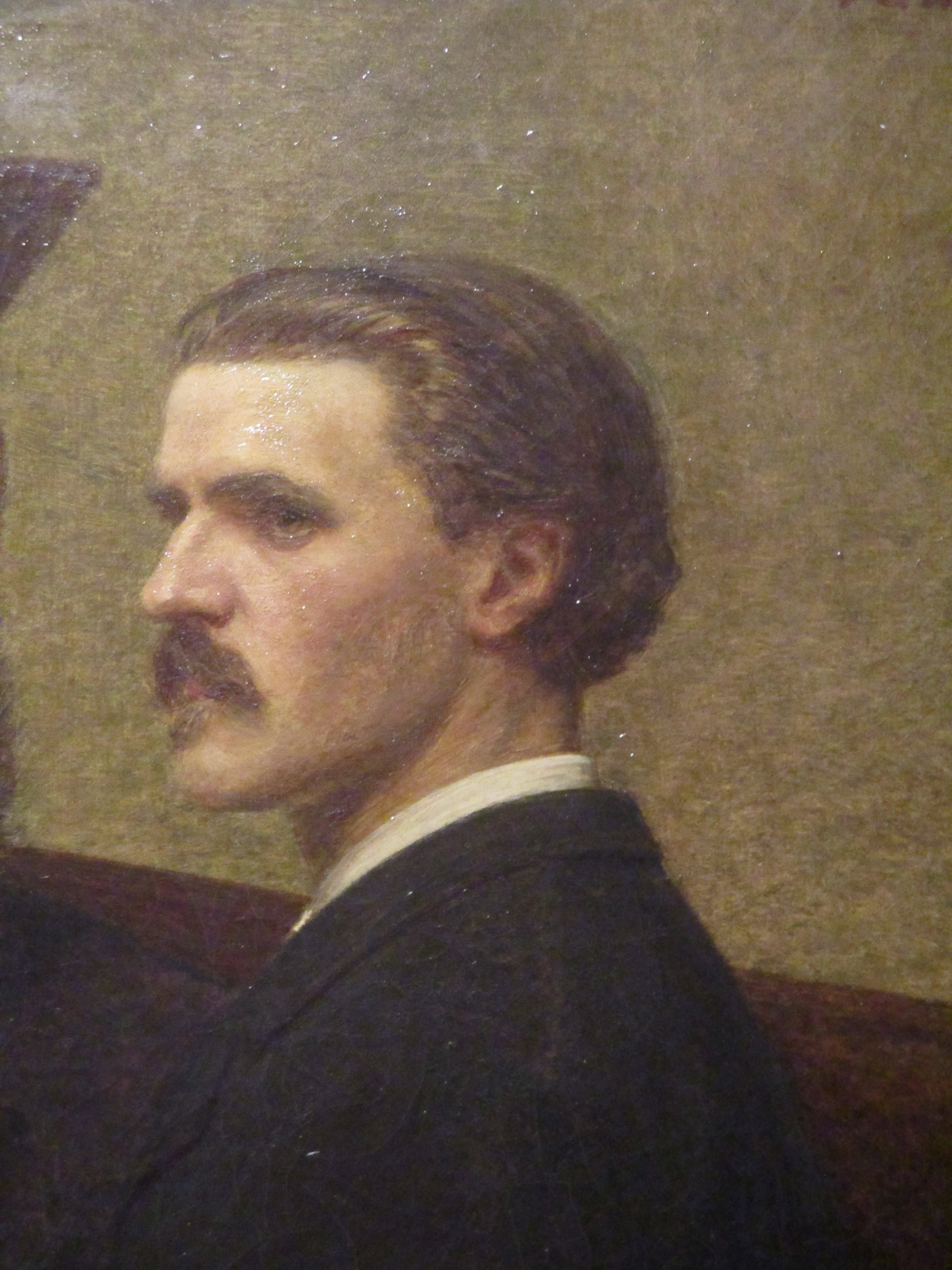
Vincent d'Indy
