= The Bohemian (Bouguereau) =

1890 painting by William Bouguereau

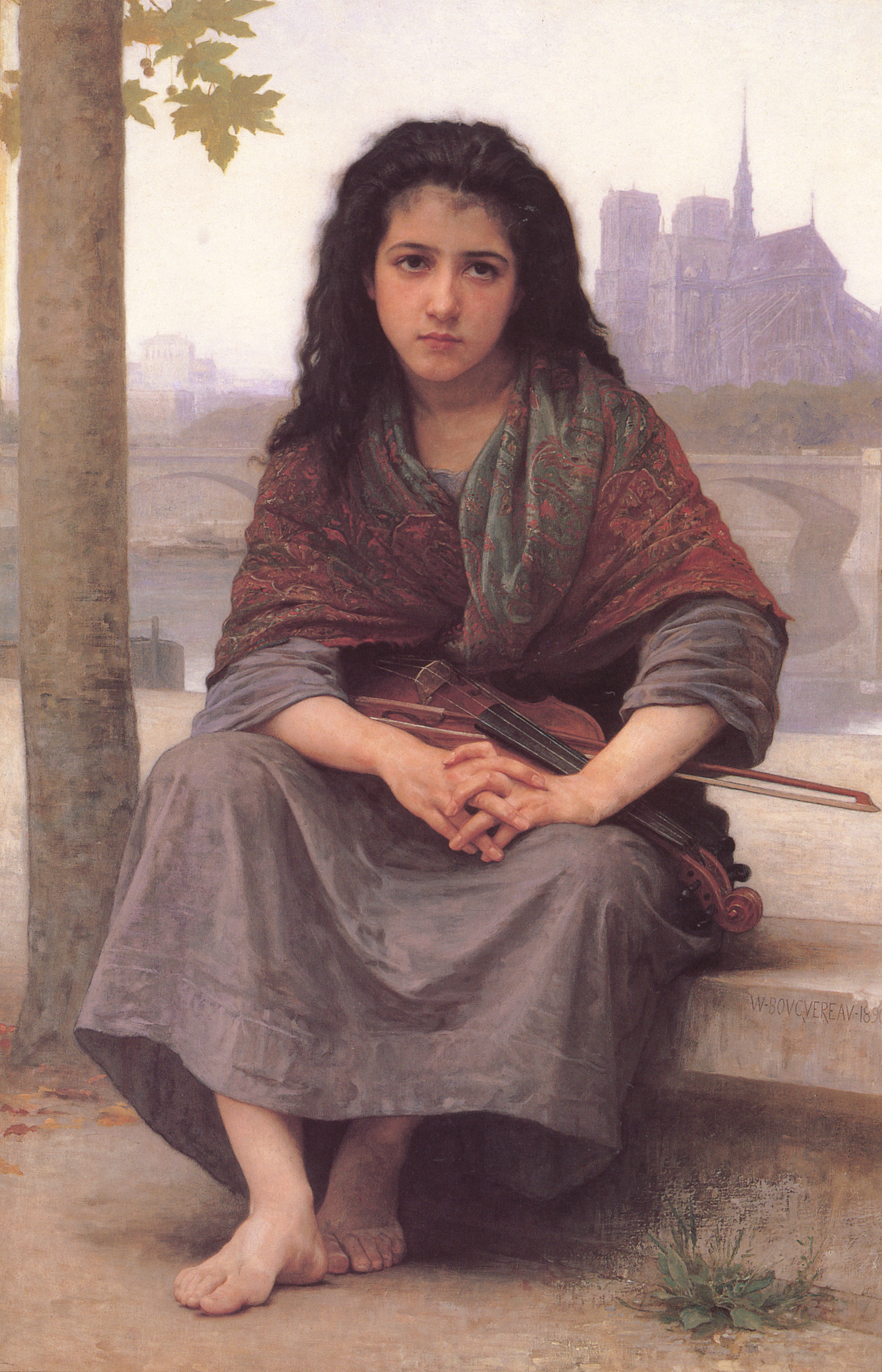
- Artist: William-Adolphe Bouguereau
- Year: 1890
- Medium: oil on canvas
- Dimensions: 149.9 cm × 106.7 cm (59.0 in × 42.0 in)

The Bohemian is an oil painting on canvas completed in 1890 by the French painter William-Adolphe Bouguereau. It depicts a barefooted young woman sitting on a concrete bench on the south bank of the Seine across from Notre Dame de Paris resting a violin in her lap. Her right arm is resting on her thigh while the palm of her left hand is pressed down on her left knee so that she does not lean on the violin. Her hands are clasped with the fingers pointing forward while her shoulders are wrapped in a shawl dyed maroon and light green, and she is wearing a gray dress that extends to her ankles. The bow of the violin has been stuck through diagonally under the fingerboard. To her right is a maple tree.

The subject is a model employed by Bouguereau for this and other paintings, including The Shepherdess.

It was owned by the Minneapolis Institute of Art until 2004 when it was auctioned by Christie's to benefit the acquisition fund.
