= The Shepherdess =

Painting by William-Adolphe Bouguereau

- Pastourelle (French)
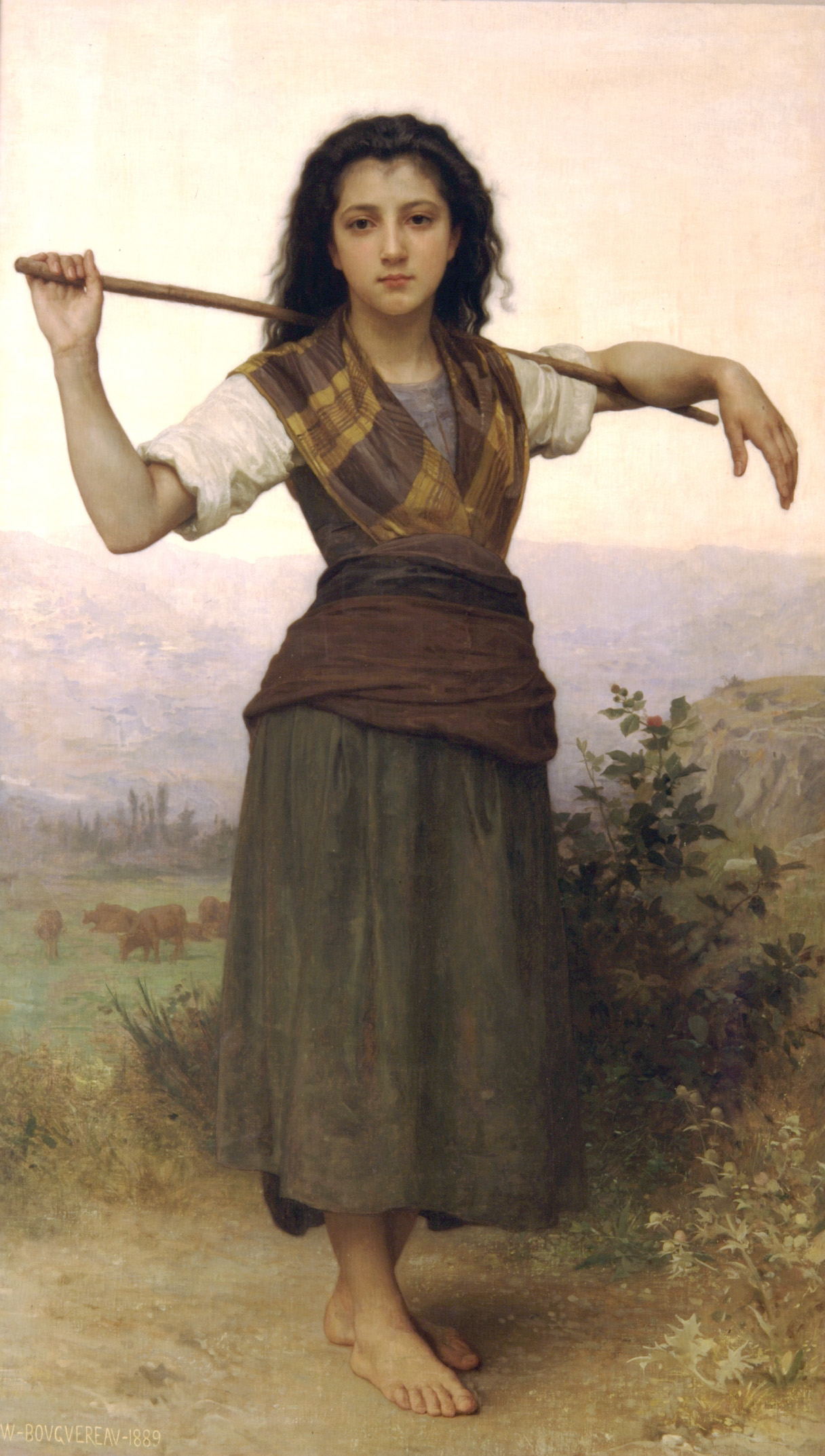
- Artist: William-Adolphe Bouguereau
- Year: 1889
- Medium: oil on canvas
- Dimensions: 158.75 cm × 93.35 cm (62.50 in × 36.75 in)
- Location: Philbrook Museum of Art, Tulsa
- Accession: 1947.8.82
- Website: philbrook.emuseum.com/objects/1872/the-shepherdess-pastourelle

The Shepherdess (French: Pastourelle), also known as The Little Shepherdess, is a painting by William-Adolphe Bouguereau completed in 1889. The title is taken from the Southern French dialect. The painting depicts an idyllic, pastoral scene of a lone young woman in peasant attire posed for the artist, balancing a stick (likely her crook) across her shoulders, standing barefooted in the foreground. In the background are oxen grazing in a field.

It is one of many paintings by Bouguereau depicting shepherdesses, including one of the same name created in 1881. The subject is a model employed by Bouguereau for this and other paintings, including The Bohemian.

The Shepherdess is currently in the permanent collection at the Philbrook Museum of Art in Tulsa, where it has become an emblematic image for the museum. It was the central image of a travelling exhibition about Bouguereau and his students that Philbrook created in 2006.

== See also ==
- The Young Shepherdess
- The Goose Girl
