= The Young Shepherdess =

1885 painting by William-Adolphe Bouguereau

- La jeune bergère (French)
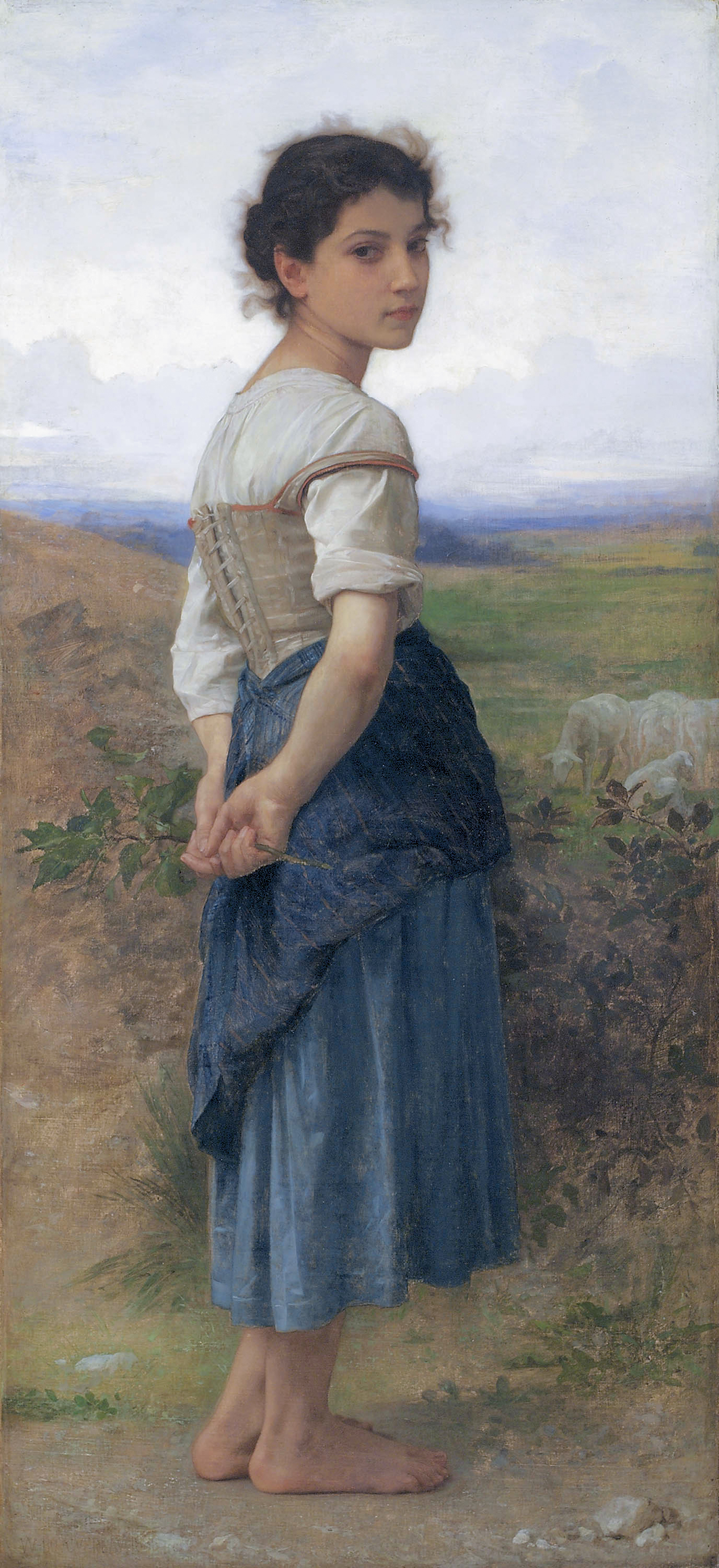
- Artist: William-Adolphe Bouguereau
- Year: 1885
- Dimensions: 157.5 cm × 72.4 cm (62.0 in × 28.5 in)
- Location: San Diego Museum of Art

The Young Shepherdess is an 1885 painting by the French painter William-Adolphe Bouguereau (1825–1905). It is owned by the San Diego Museum of Art.

== Overview ==
The painting depicts a barefoot young woman in peasant clothing, turned away from but still facing the viewer. She holds a plant in her hands. See also The Shepherdess, a similar painting by the same artist.

This and similar images by the artist attracted collectors in Europe and America because of their nostalgic content. In such works the artist depicted a variety of poses and expressions, in this case showing the mild curiosity of the girl.

In portraying a shepherdess Bouguereau is working within the pastoral mode or theme, as developed by ancient Greek and Hellenistic artists and poets. French painters who preceded him in this include Claude Lorrain, Poussin, and Watteau.

== Gallery ==
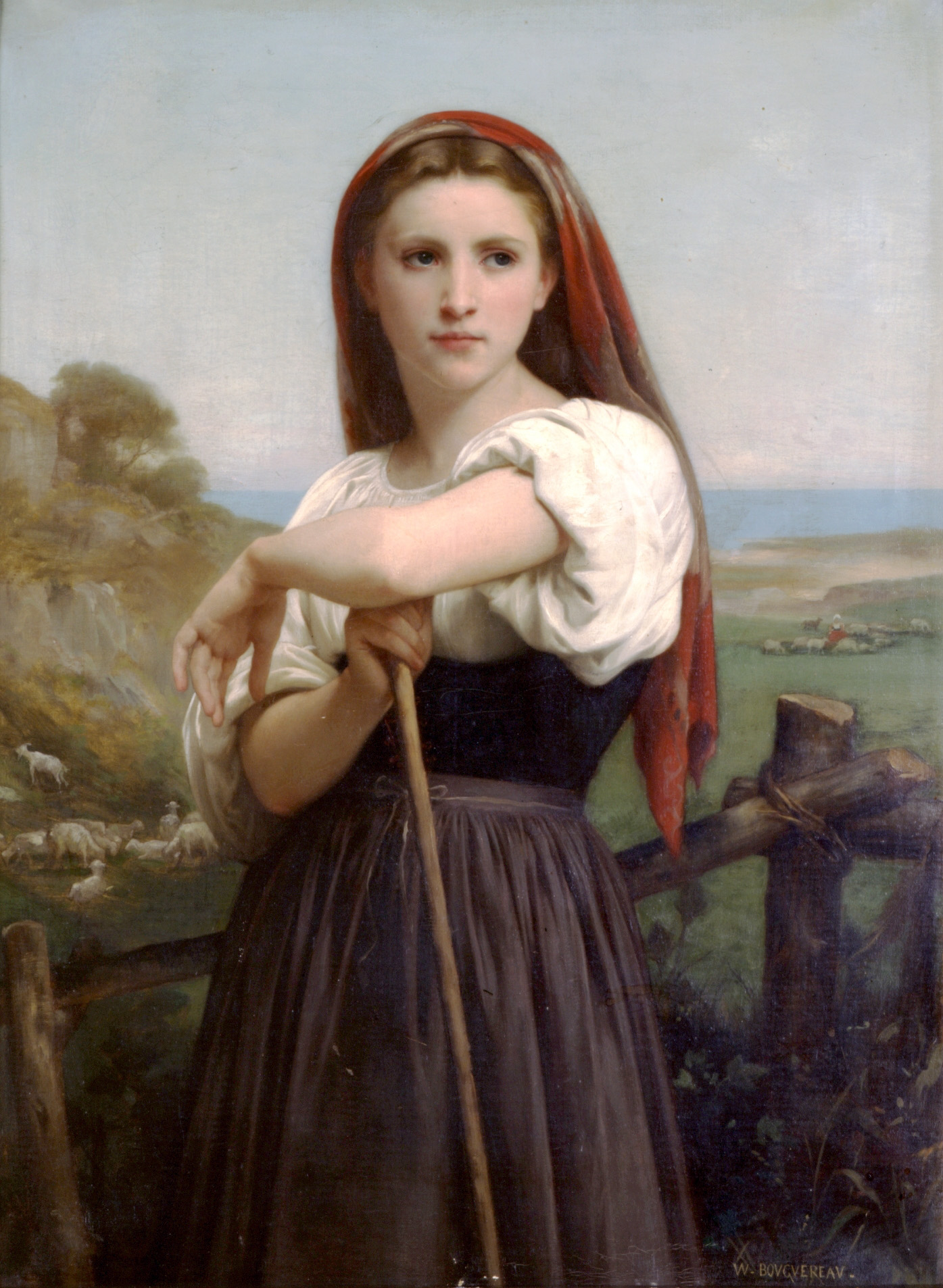
Young Shepherdess, 1868, 106 x 78.7 cm, Appleton Museum of Art

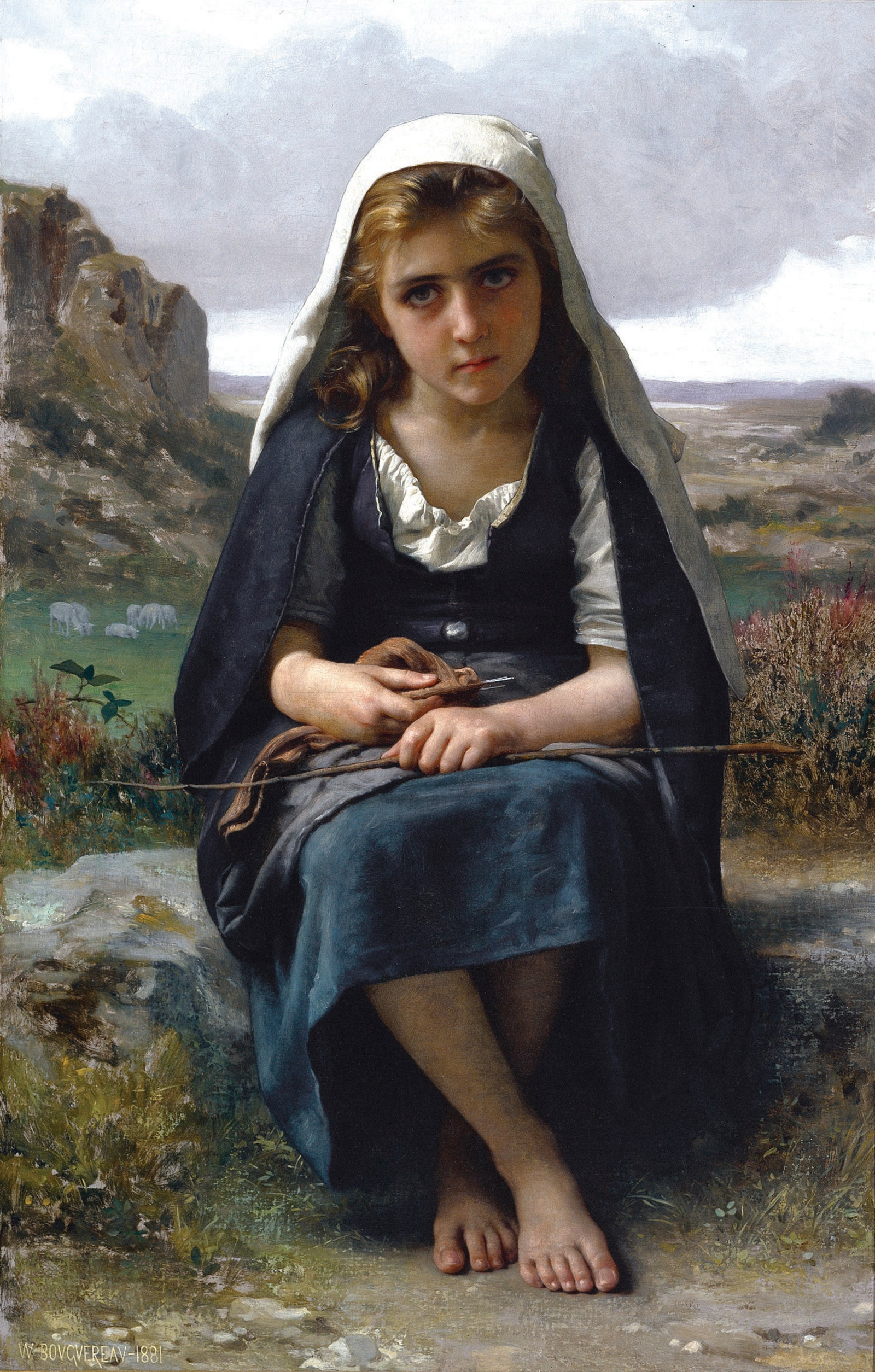
The shepherdess, 1881, 116.8 x 72.4 cm, Frye Art Museum

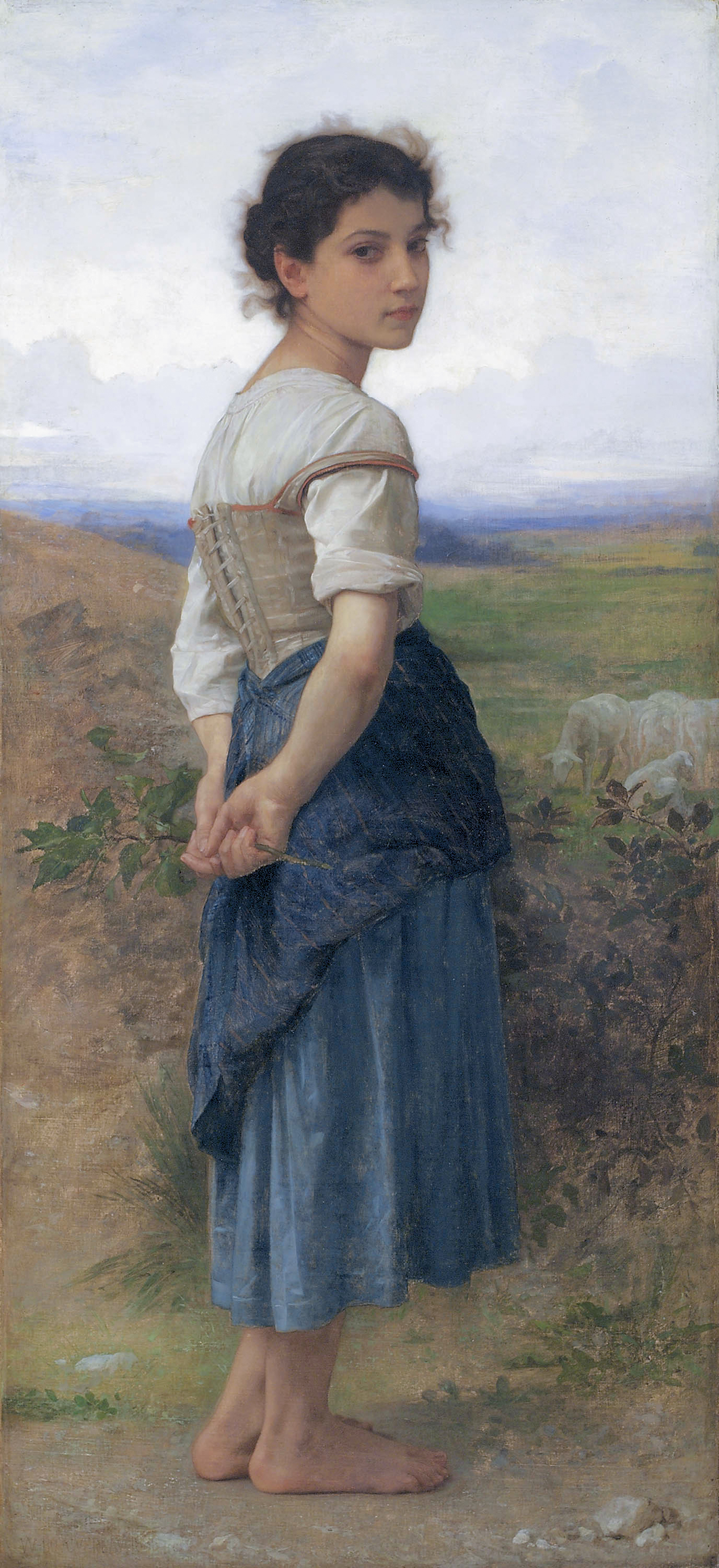
The Young Shepherdess, 1885, 157.5 x 72.4 cm, San Diego Museum of Art

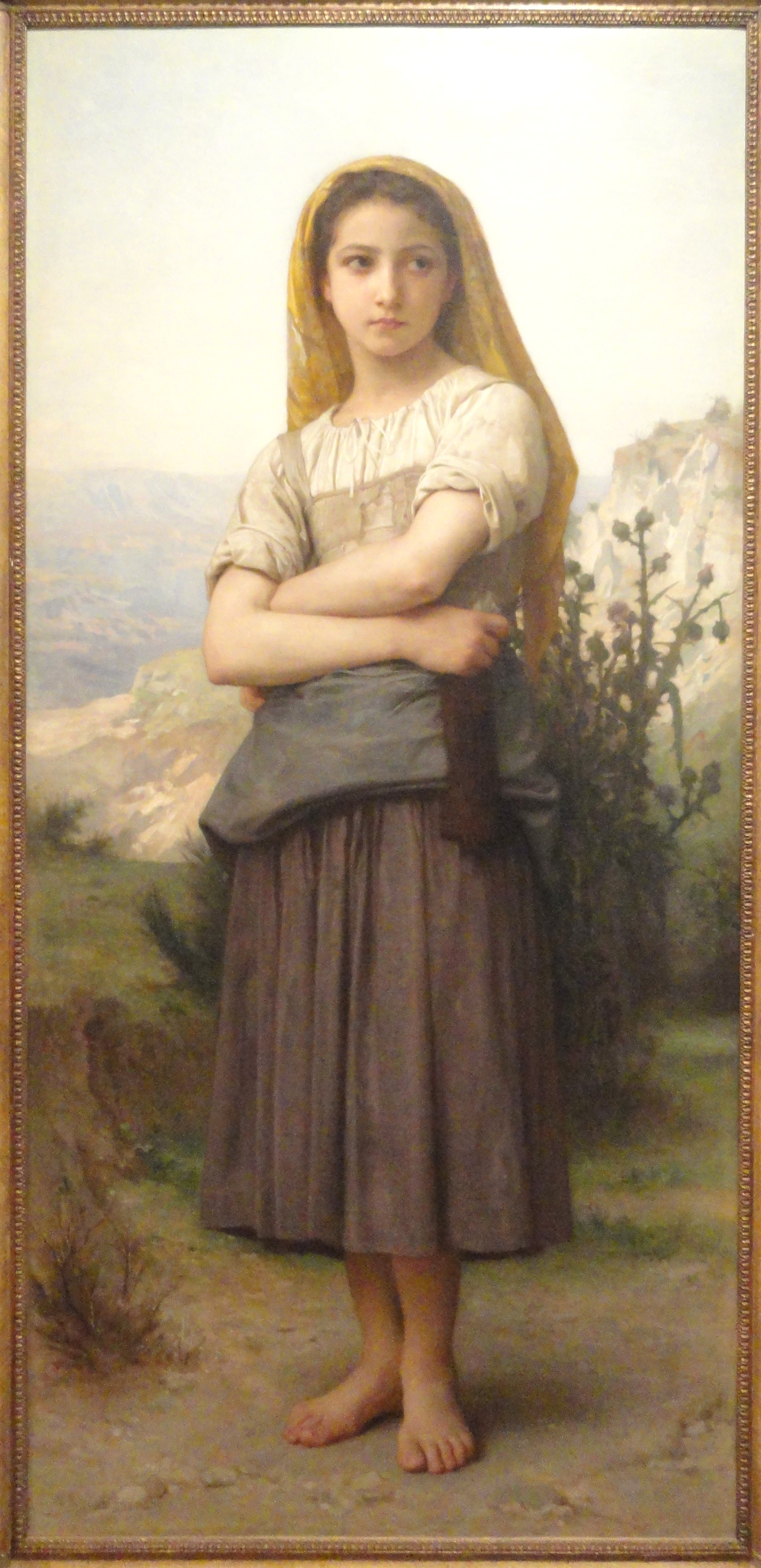
Shepherdess, 1886, 160 x 76 cm, Michele and Donald D'Amour Museum of Fine Arts

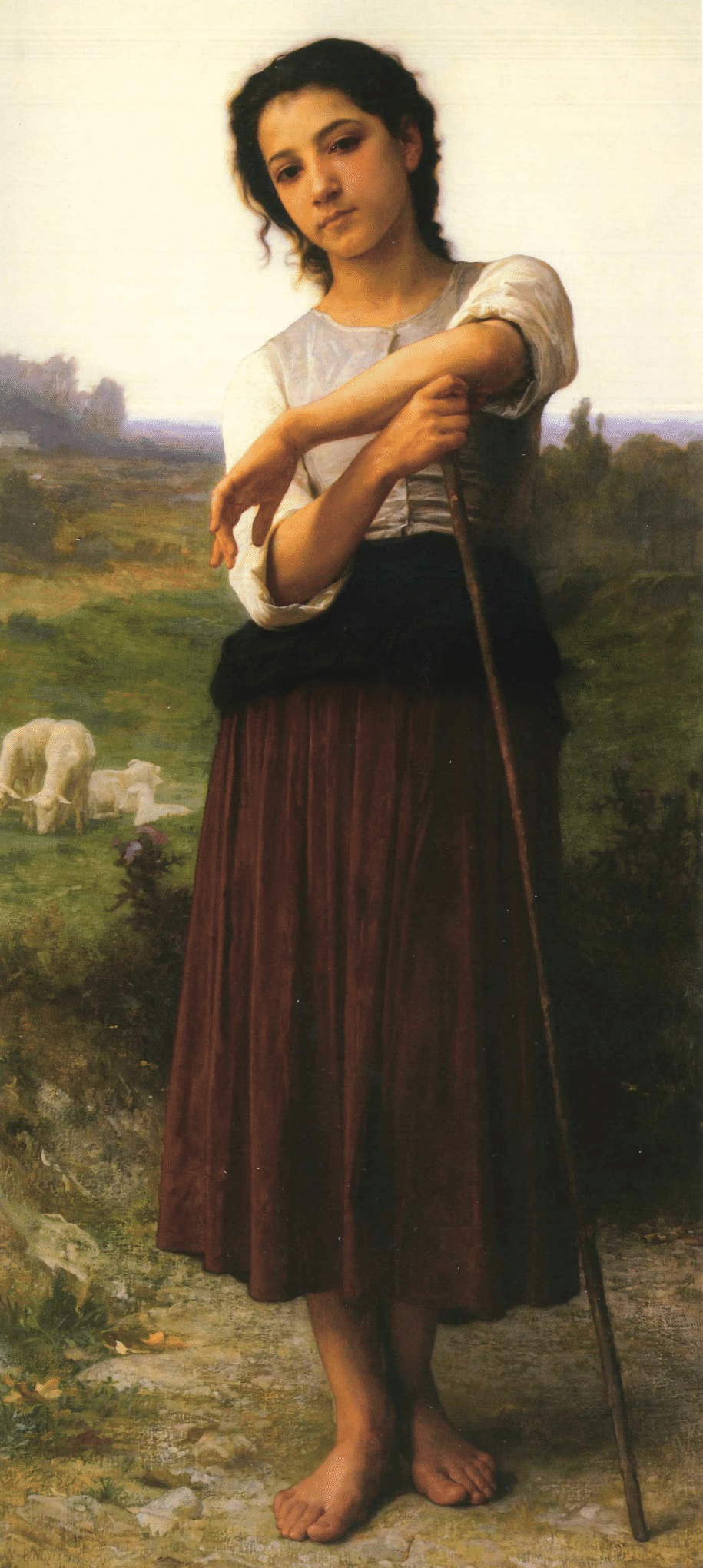
Young Shepherdess standing, 1887, 157.5 x 73.5 cm

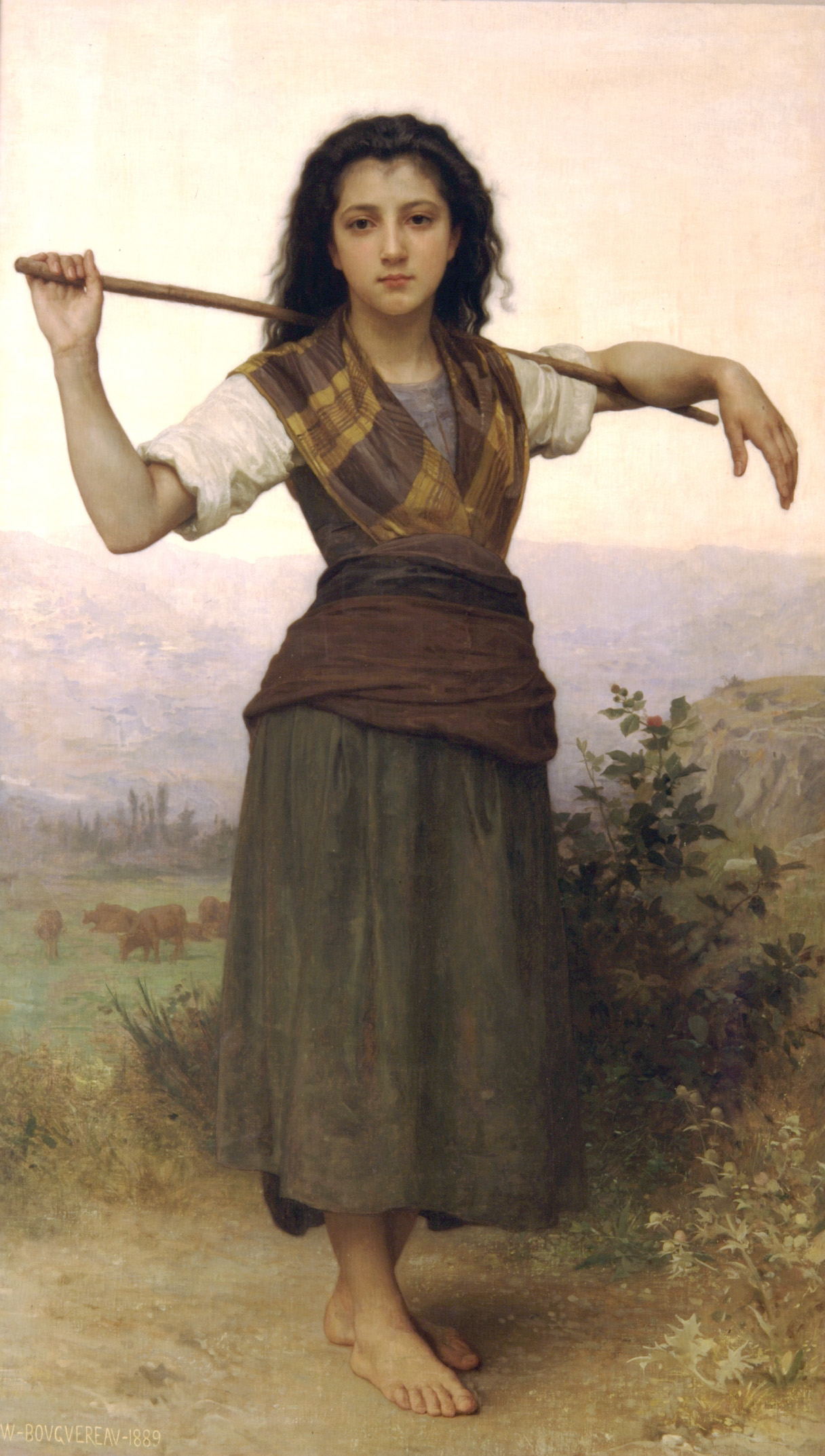
The Shepherdess, 1889, 159 x 93 cm, Philbrook Museum of Art

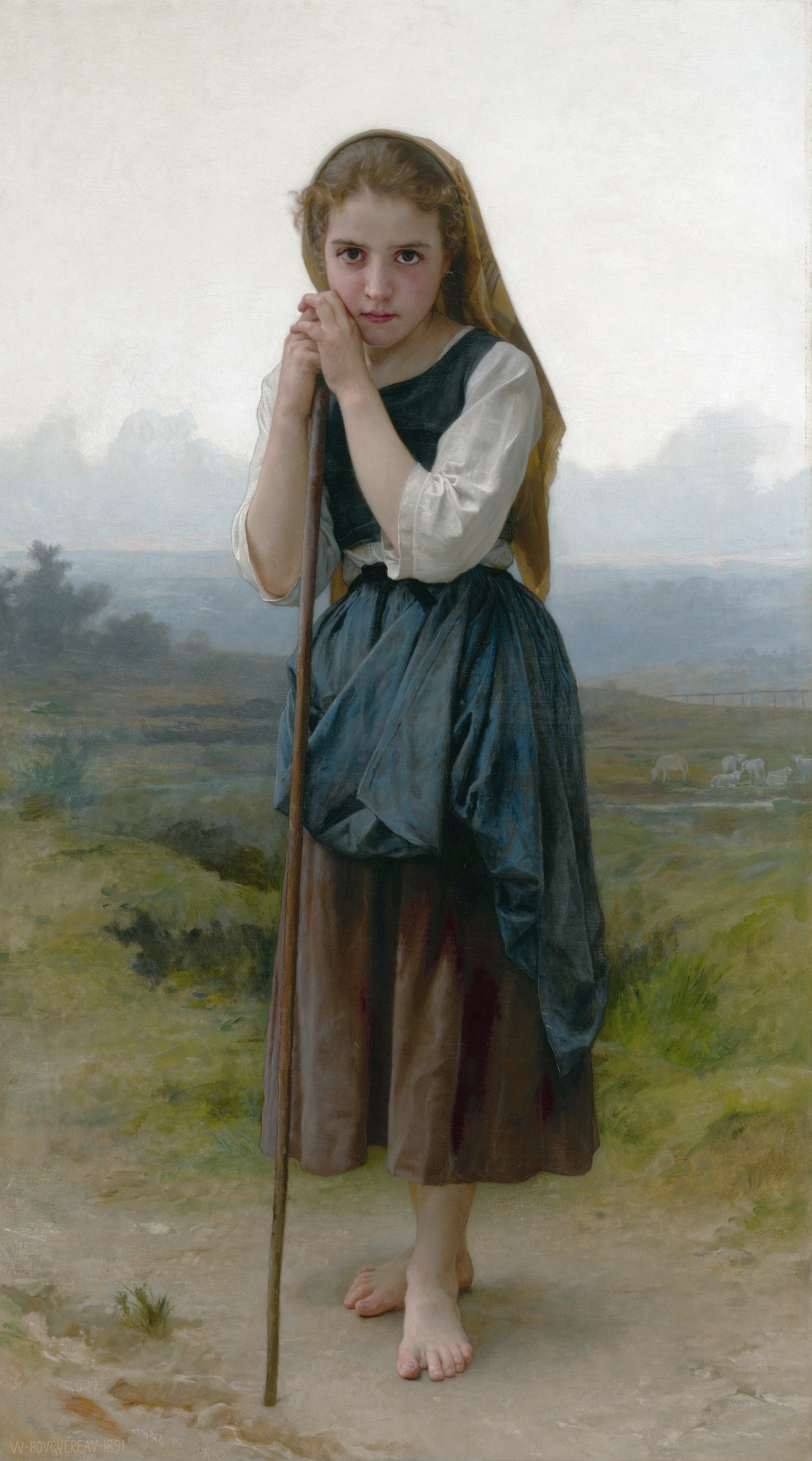
Small shepherd, 1891, 158 x 89 cm, Private Collection
