= Paintings of Amsterdam by Vincent van Gogh =

View of Amsterdam from Central Station
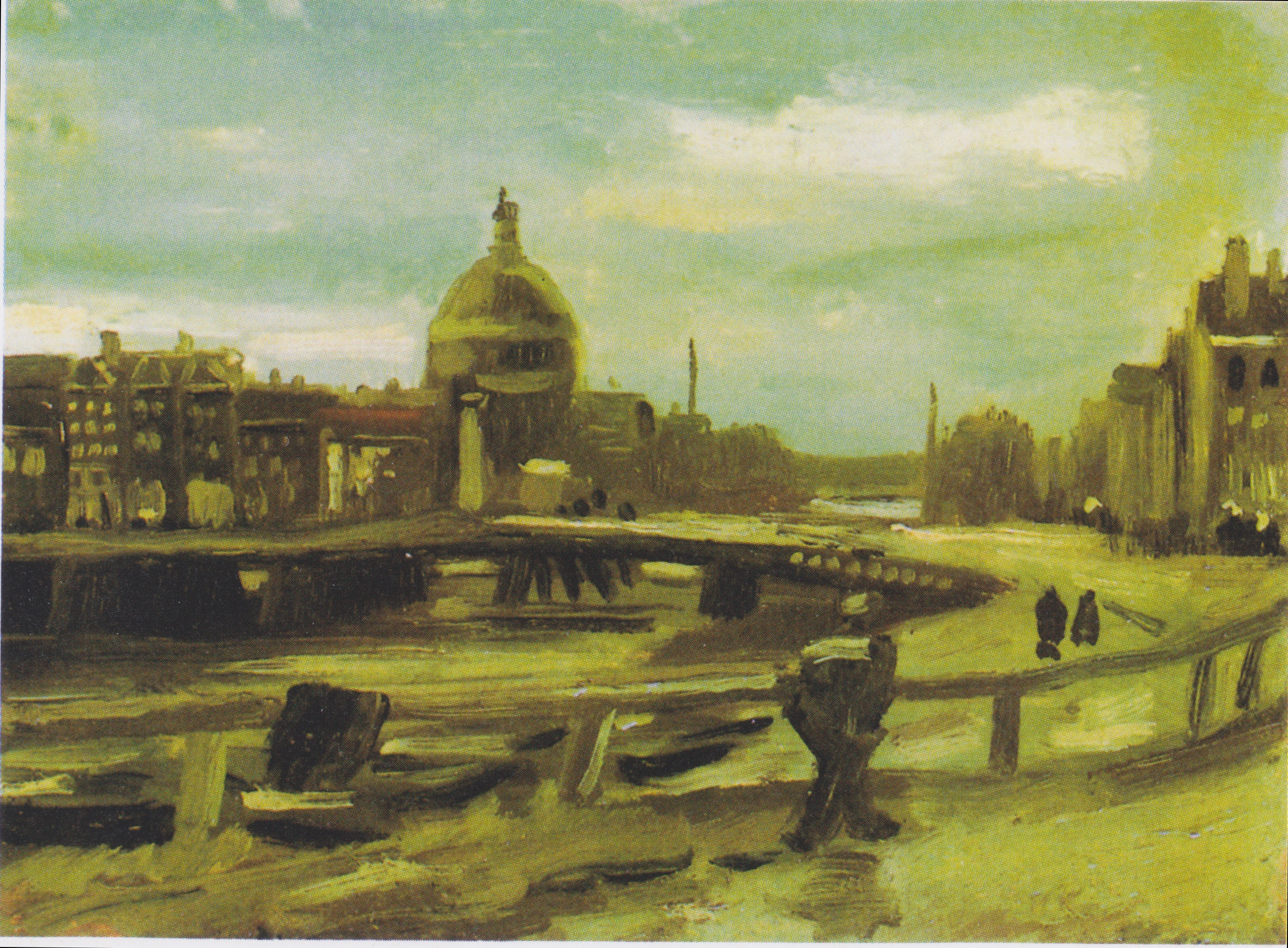
- Artist: Vincent van Gogh
- Year: October 1885
- Catalogue: F113; JH944
- Medium: oil on canvas
- Dimensions: 19 cm × 25.5 cm (7.5 in × 10.0 in)
- Location: Rijksmuseum; Amsterdam

The De Ruijterkade in Amsterdam
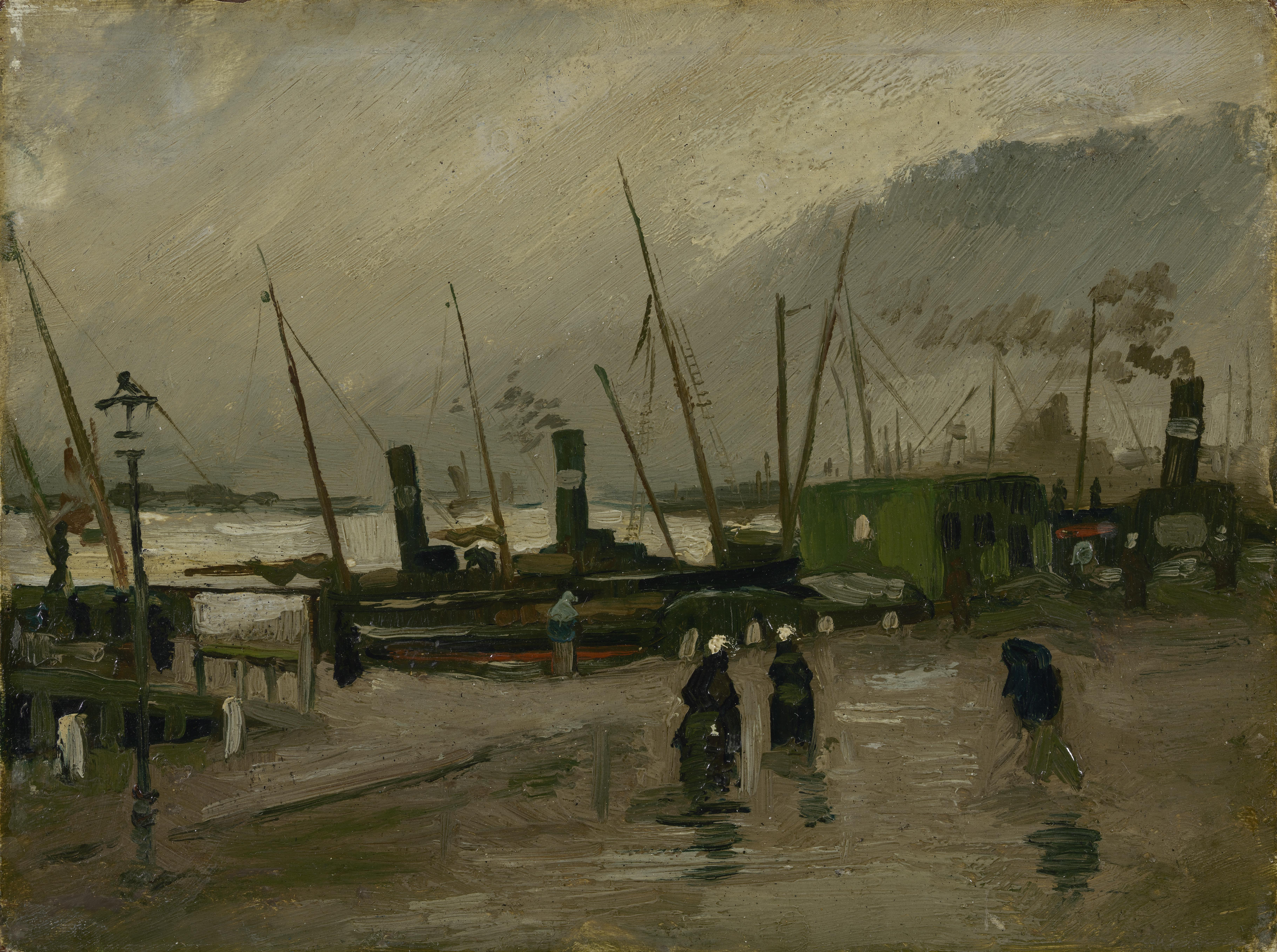
- Artist: Vincent van Gogh
- Year: October 1885
- Catalogue: F211; JH973
- Medium: oil on canvas
- Dimensions: 20.3 cm × 27 cm (8.0 in × 11 in)
- Location: Van Gogh Museum; Amsterdam

In October 1885 Vincent van Gogh made a series of paintings of Amsterdam during a visit: View of Amsterdam from Central Station (title of painting in Dutch: Stadsgezicht in Amsterdam) and The De Ruijterkade in Amsterdam (in Dutch: De Ruijterkade te Amsterdam).

== Amsterdam visit ==
Van Gogh traveled to Amsterdam by train in early October 1885 where he spent much of his three days there at Rijksmuseum exploring the work of Frans Hals, Rembrandt and other known artists. Van Gogh was impressed by the bright colors used by Frans Hals. When he went to Paris, less than a year later, he started using brighter colors himself, like the painting Trees on a slope (in Dutch: Oever met bomen).

While in Amsterdam his travel companion shopped at Van Gogh's Uncle Cor's business, but he did not enter the store, likely due to strained relations after Van Gogh's experiences in The Hague. Van Gogh's art dealer uncle, Cornelis Marinus, commissioned 20 ink drawings of the city, which the artist completed by the end of May but were not acceptable to his uncle. To further complicate matters, Van Gogh had a falling-out with cousin-in-law, Anton Mauve, who had funded a studio for Van Gogh and provided training and guidance in developing his artistic skills. Mauve and his family did not approve of his domestic relationship with prostitute Sien Hoornik.

=== Created paintings ===
While in Amsterdam he completed two paintings View of Amsterdam from Central Station and The De Ruijterkade in Amsterdam. He wrote about these paintings: "The small panels I painted in Amsterdam were done in a great hurry. One even in the waiting room of the station, when I was too early for the train, the other in the morning, before I went to the museum at 10 o'clock. Yet I am sending them to you, look upon them as 'Dutch tiles,' on which something is dashed off in a few strokes."

In March 2024 it was announced that the Rijksmuseum received the paintings View of Amsterdam from Central Station together with the paintings Trees on a slope and Wheat Field (in Dutch Korenveld; one of the Wheat Fields paintings) on loan for a long period of time.

== See also ==
- List of works by Vincent van Gogh
