= Claude Monet Painting by the Edge of a Wood =

Painting by John Singer Sargent

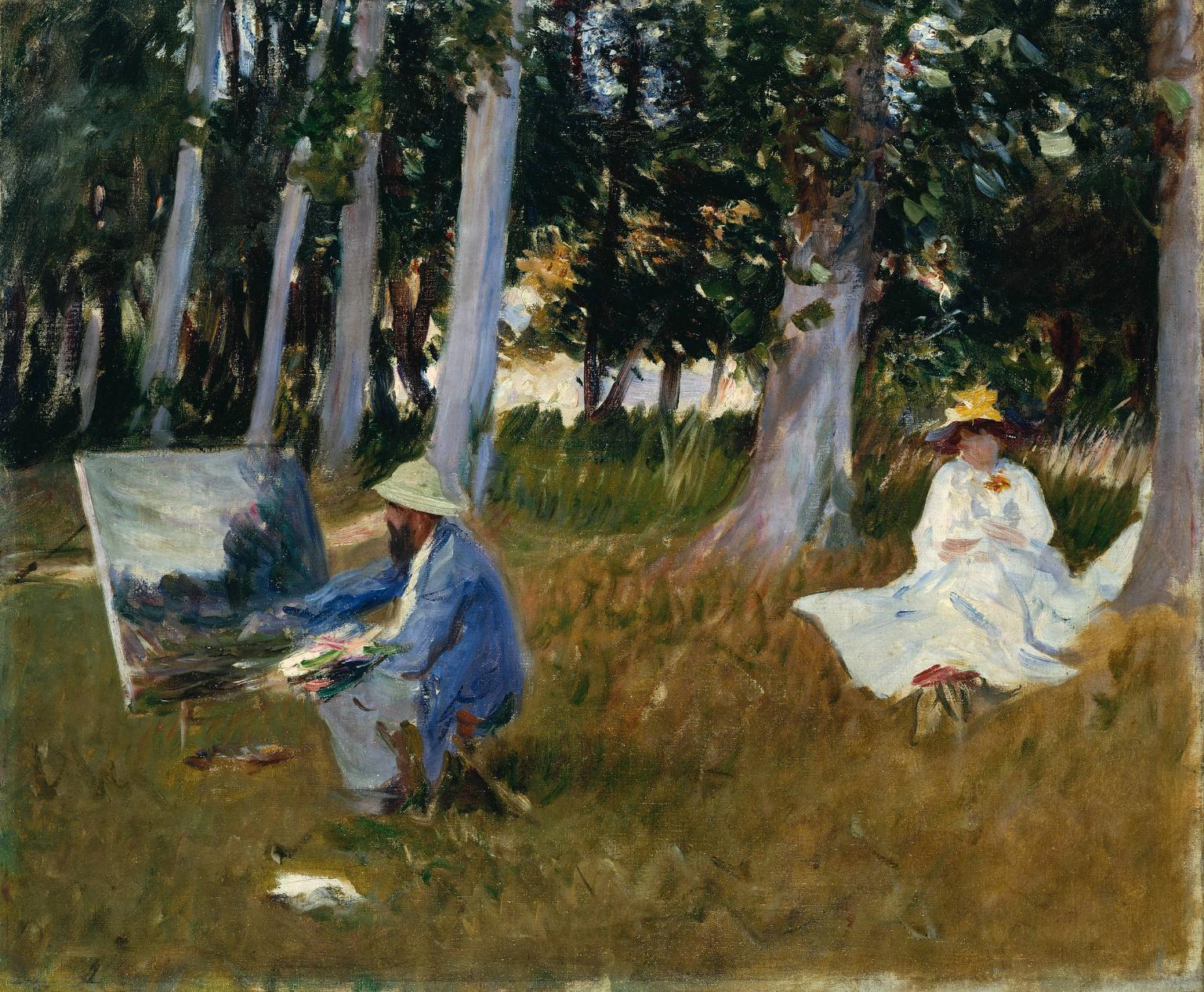
- Artist: John Singer Sargent
- Year: c.1885
- Type: Oil on canvas, portrait painting
- Dimensions: 54 cm × 64.8 cm (21 in × 25.5 in)
- Location: Tate Britain, London

Claude Monet Painting by the Edge of a Wood is an c.1885 portrait painting by the American artist John Singer Sargent. It depicts the French artist Claude Monet painting En plein air in the French countryside, accompanied by Alice Hoschedé who would become his second wife. Monet was by this time a well known figures of the Impressionist movement. It represents one of Sargent's first attempts at Impressionism. After settling in Britain he became best-known for his stylish portraits. The painting is now in the Tate Britain in London, having been given by the artist's sisters Emily and Violet in 1925.

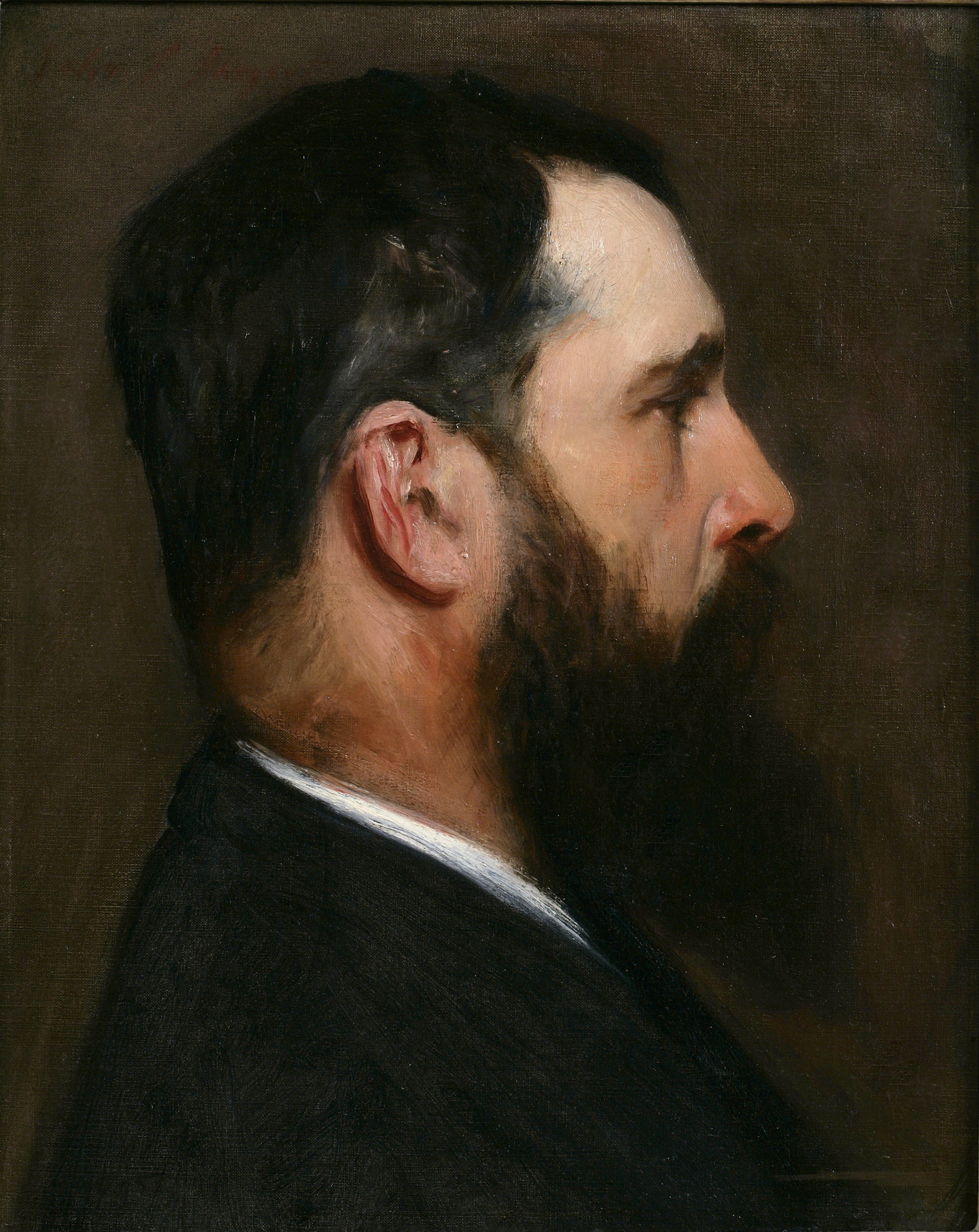
Portrait of Claude Monet, 1887

Sargent produced another, different Portrait of Claude Monet, which he presented as his diploma work to the National Academy of Design in New York.

== Bibliography ==
- McConkey, Kenneth (ed.) Impressionism in Britain. Yale University Press, 1995.
- McCarthy, Jeremiah William & Thompson, Diana. For America: Paintings from the National Academy of Design. Yale University Press, 2019.
