= Chula (music) =

Dance and music genre from Portugal

Chula is a dance and music genre which originated in Portugal, dating at least from the eighteenth century.

== Portuguese Chula ==
The traditional Portuguese Chula folkdance has a tempo and rhythm marked by a bass drum, a triangle and cymbals, and is native to the Upper Douro. It incorporates singing accompanied by violins, violas, accordions and percussion. The Portuguese Chula was an important influence on the emergence of samba rhythms and Rio Grande do Sul Gaucho dance in Brazil.

== Brazilian Chula ==
Chula in Bahia, Brazil, Santo Amaro da Purificação and surrounding areas, is an expression of the African-Brazilian culture. It is a style of samba practiced during dance festivals and involves short steps and cyclical movements typical of samba. The music features strong drum rhythms and call-and-response guitar or viola playing.

The chula, in the state of Rio Grande do Sul, takes the form of a challenge, in which only men are allowed to contest. A four-foot wooden stick, commonly called spear, is placed on the floor. At the sound of accordions, the contesting dancers perform different tapping steps back and forth across the spear. After a sequence is performed by a dancer, the following one must at least repeat it, preferably also increasing the complexity of the movements. One will lose the challenge if unable to repeat the movements played by the challenging dancer, or if one touches the spear while dancing. Nowadays, the Chula is performed mostly in folk music festivals and rodeos.
