= Lucienne Heuvelmans =

French sculptor

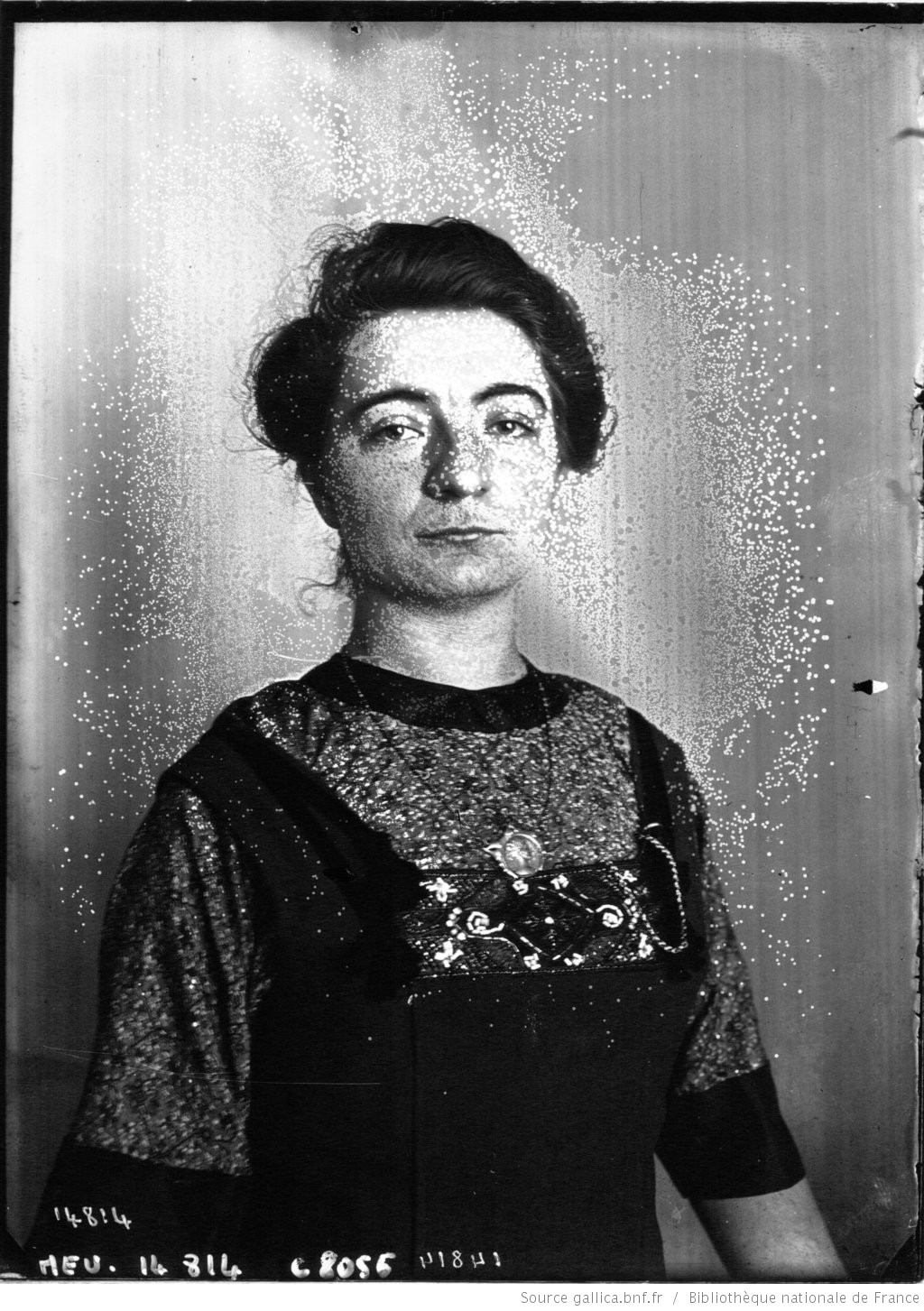
- Lucienne Heuvelmans, Prix de Rome 1911
- Born: Lucienne-Antoinette-Adélaïde Heuvelmans; 1885; Paris, France
- Died: 1944 (aged 58–59); Saint-Cast-le-Guildo, France
- Known for: Sculpture, Illustration

Lucienne Heuvelmans (1885–1944) was a French sculptor and illustrator.

== Her life ==
She was born in the 12th arrondissement of Paris on December 25, 1881 or 1885, the daughter of Osval Heuvelmans, a designer and cabinetmaker from Ath, and Donatilde Sandra, a milliner from Leuze-en-Hainaut. These two cities in Hainaut, Belgium, still preserve works of the artist: a bronze Christ in the museum of history and archeology of Ath and a Pax Armata on the monument to the dead of Leuze.

After attending evening classes in sculpture, Heuvelmans was admitted to the École des Beaux-Arts in 1904. She studied under the sculptors Laurent Marqueste, Emmanuel Hannaux (fr), and Denys Puech. After an unsuccessful bid in 1908, receiving the first second Grand Prix in 1910, Heuvelmans became the first woman to win the Grande Prix de Rome for sculpture in July 1911 for her work, The Sister of Orestes Guarding Her Brother's Sleep.

Admitted to the Villa Medici, she studied there from January 1912 to December 1914 under the direction of Albert Besnard.

On her return to France, Heuvelmans was appointed professor of drawing in the schools of the City of Paris. She installed her studio on the ground floor and the mezzanine of 17, rue des Tournelles in the rear wing of the hotel de Rohan-Guémené. The hotel's main facade overlooks the Place des Vosges in the 4th arrondissement. She regularly participated in exhibitions at the Salon des artistes français where she earned an honorable mention in 1907, then a bronze medal in 1921, and at the Salon des artistes décorateurs in the Grand Palais between 1926 and 1933. From 1924 to 1926, she completed commissions for the Manufacture de Sèvres.

Lucienne Heuvelmans received the insignia of Knight of the Legion of Honor in 1926 under the Ministry of Fine Arts (Decree of 22 May 1926). In the early 1930s, she settled in Brittany in Saint-Cast-le-Guildo. She specialized in ancient mythology and religious art.

Heuvelmans died on February 26, 1944, in Saint-Cast at the age of 62. She rests in the family burial plot of the Heuvelmans in the Père-Lachaise cemetery.

== Her work ==
There is no catalogue raisonné of the work of Lucienne Heuvelmans. Especially famous for her sculptures, she has also illustrated various works of poetry. Her works bear the signature L. Heuvelmans.

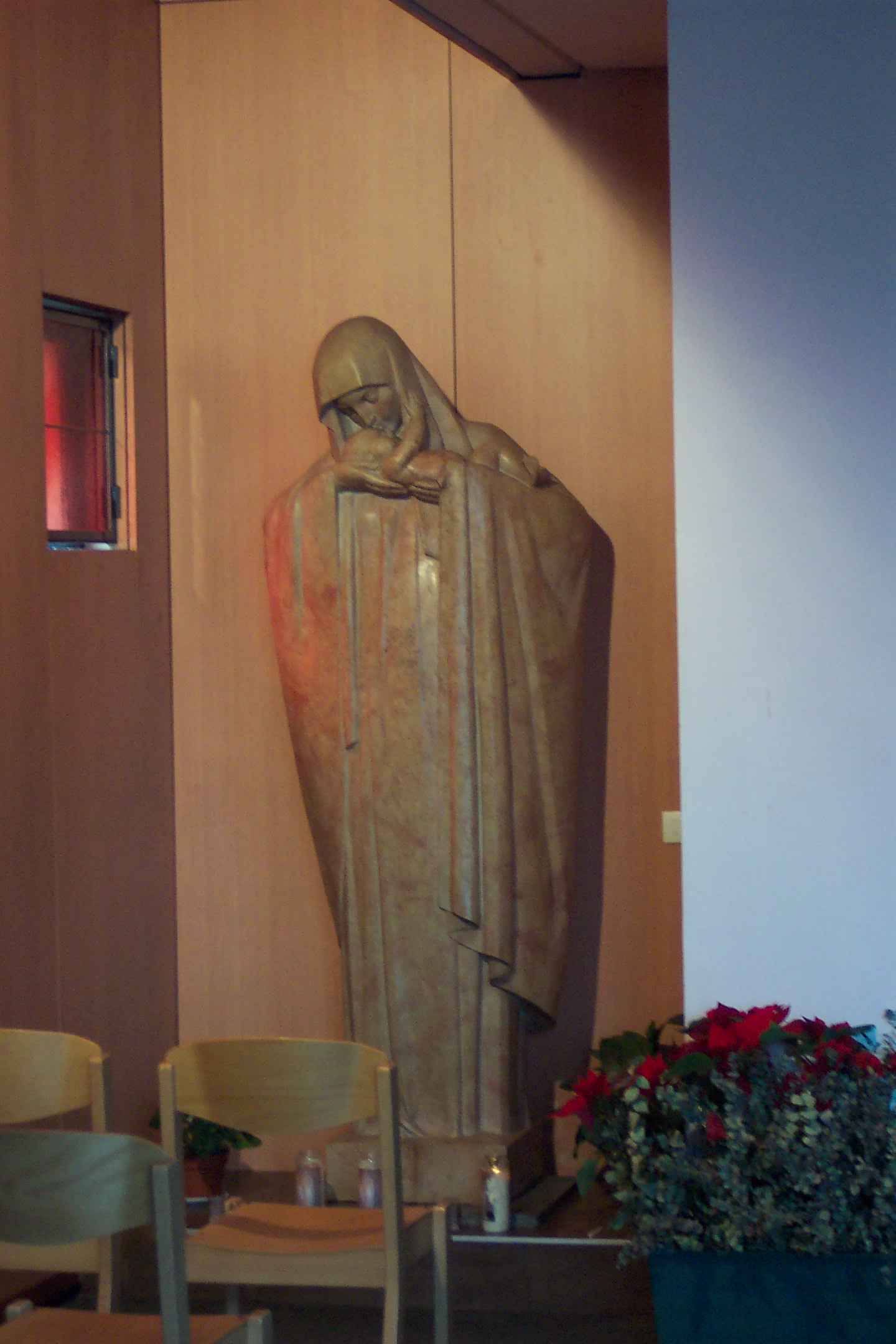
Notre-Dame d'Espérance (Our Lady of Hope), 1928

- Sculptures
  - Vénus sauve Hélène de la mort (Venus saves Helen from death). Bas-relief in plaster (1909). Town Hall of Paulhan (Hérault).
  - Oreste et Électre endormis. (Orestes and Electra asleep). Bas-relief in plaster preserved at the Ecole Nationale Superieure des Beaux-Arts in Paris ( 1911 ). It is with this work that Lucienne Heuvelmans won the first Grand Prix of Rome of sculpture.
  - Buste de Lili Boulanger (1916).
  - Pax Armata. Marble depicting a naked man holding a sword (1917). Order of the State for the Museum of the Army now on deposit at the Cercle Militaire de Paris'. Reproduction in bronze on the monument to the dead of Leuze-en-Hainaut in Belgium (1922).
  - Monument aux morts de la Grande Guerre (Monument to the Fallen of the Great War). Lying in stone. Monolithic sculpture on granite base (1922). Commune of Graye-sur-Mer, Calvados.
  - Albert de Mun. Marble bust. Commissioned by the State for the National Assembly (1923), it is exhibited in the room of the 4 columns.
  - Les Fruits d'Or. Especially of porcelain table. Order of the Manufacture of Sèvres (1924).
  - Les Illusions et le Regret. Monumental stone group. Order of the city of Paris for the garden of their pavilion at the International Exhibition of Modern Decorative and Industrial Arts of 1925. Moved in 1933 to the entrance of the newly created square Séverine in the 20th arrondissement, it was dismantled during the Occupation. Current location unknown.
  - La Jeunesse et l'Amour (Youth and Love). Stone group from two of the figures of the previous group (1927). Order of the State for the prefecture of the Ardennes in Charleville-Mézières. Drawings in bronze with green patina and silver bronze have been marketed and are known under the mistaken designation of Cupid and Psyche or Cupid and Venus.
  - L'Autel des Héros (The Altar of Heroes). Monument to the Fallen of the Great Stone War (1926). Church of Saint-Cast-le-Guildo.
  - Notre-Dame d'Espérance (Our Lady of Hope). Pink stone from Tournus (1928). Church Notre Dame d'Esperance in Paris, rue de la Roquette, which also preserves a way of the cross also in pink stone from Tournus by the same artist. More commonly known as the Madonna and Child or Maternity, this statue was reproduced for nearly half a century to thousands of copies in various sizes and materials: plaster, terracotta, earthenware, wood, bronze – chryselphantin. A copy of the original work is in the church of Saint-Louis in Reims.
  - Bacchus enfant ou l'Enfant au pampre et à l'oiseau (Bacchus Child or The Child with the Vine and the Bird). Bronze with green patina according to the original plaster model of 1928 .
  - Sainte Thérèse aux bras ouverts sous une pluie de roses (Saint Therese with open Arms under a Shower of Roses). Molded cement (1930). Church of Pleurtuit. Another example in plaster in the church of Saint-Cast-le-Guildo.
- Drawings
  - Le Rémouleur (The Remoulder). Drawing with black stone preserved at the Ecole des Beaux-Arts in Paris. Bridan Award, 1904.
- Pictures
  - Roma Beata by Georges Noblemaire (Henri Piazza Art Edition, Paris, 1918). 40 sonnets illustrated with 40 drawings by Lucienne Heuvelmans.
- Distinctions
  - Prix Bridan in 1904
  - Second Grand Prix of Rome of sculpture in 1909
  - First Grand Prix of Rome of sculpture in 1911
  - Prix Veuve Beulé in 1922
  - Prix Eugène Piot in 1926
  - Silver medal of the Society of French Artists in 1935
  - Knight of the Legion of Honor in 1926
