= A Reading from Homer =

Painting by Lawrence Alma-Tadema

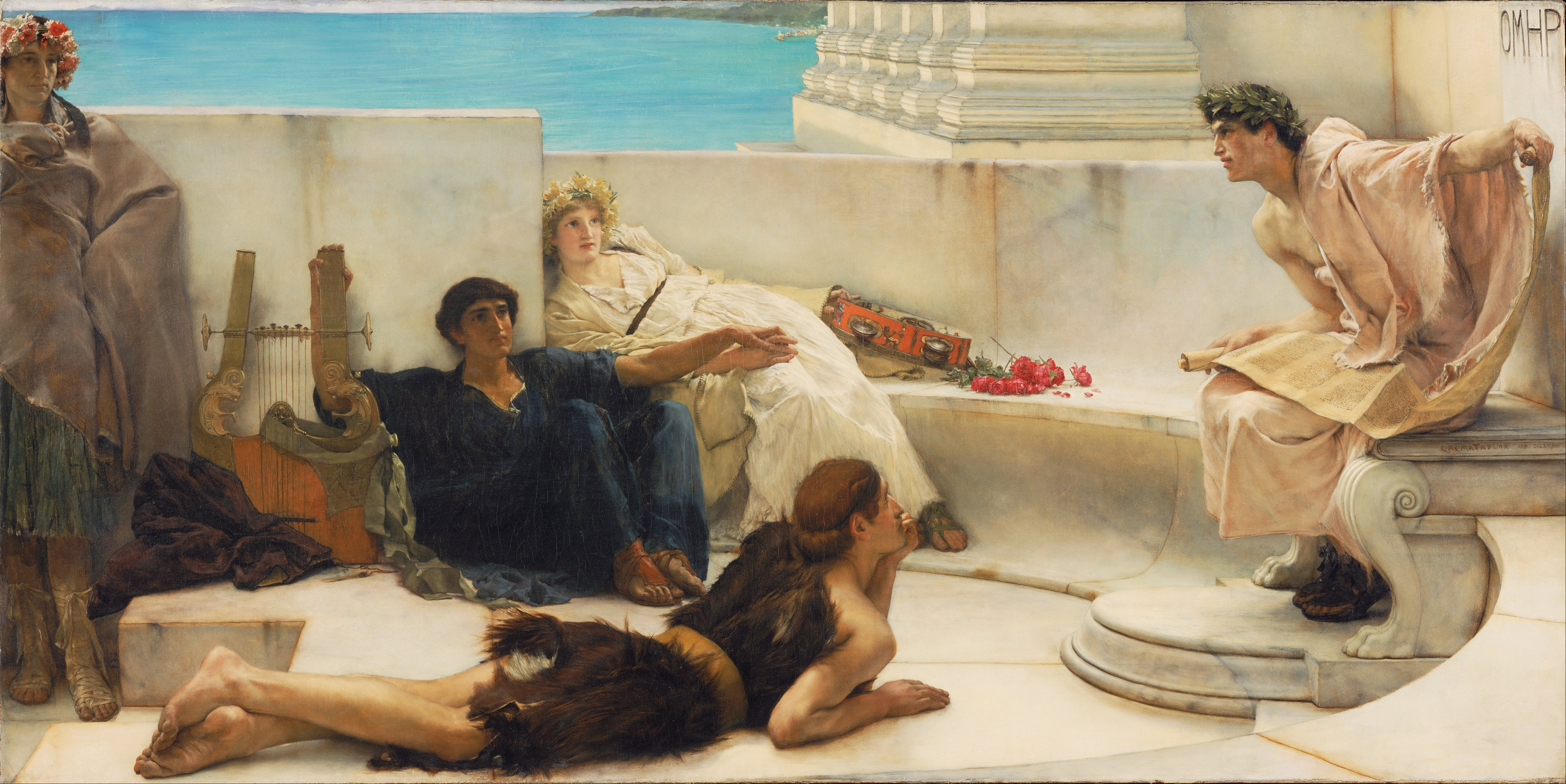
- Artist: Lawrence Alma-Tadema
- Year: 1885
- Medium: oil on canvas
- Dimensions: 91.8 cm × 183.5 cm (36.1 in × 72.2 in)
- Location: Philadelphia Museum of Art, Philadelphia

A Reading from Homer (sometimes Listening to Homer) is an oil-on-canvas painting executed in 1885 by the English artist Lawrence Alma-Tadema. It depicts an imaginary festival scene from ancient Greece with youth reading poetry to a small audience on a marble balcony overlooking the sea. The painting has been in the collection of the Philadelphia Museum of Art since 1924.

== Background ==
The painting was commissioned in 1882 by the U.S. banker Henry Gurdon Marquand (1819–1902), after he had acquired a small Alma-Tadema painting, Amo Te, Ama Me (1881, oil on panel, 7 in × 15 in (18 cm × 38 cm), now in the Fries Museum, Leeuwarden). The commission was for a larger work which was originally intended to depict Plato teaching philosophy to a small group of followers arranged around the marble courtyard of a temple precinct overlooking the sea, with Plato seated on a marble chair between the columns of the temple. After working on the painting of Plato for a considerable time, Alma-Tadema was still dissatisfied with the result and he repainted the work afresh in early 1885, ultimately producing a similar painting which became A Reading from Homer. Pentimenti show that the composition continued to evolve: for example, Alma-Tadema changed the speaker's arm, which had been thrown out in a dramatic declamatory gesture.

== Description ==
A Reading from Homer depicts a scene on a marble balcony in ancient Greece, overlooking the sea. To the right, below Greek letters on a wall spelling ΟΜΗΡ ('Homer'), a young seated man with a laurel wreath on his head appears to be reciting from a scroll, although he has looked up from the text to his audience. It is unclear whether the man is intended to be Homer himself or somebody else. Four listeners stand, sit or lie on a marble bench and the marble floor, dressed for a festival: one man standing, another man lying prone in goat skins (perhaps a shepherd), and a couple reclining, holding hands, with musical instruments: a man with the cithara and a woman with a tambourine. The setting appears to be a time of festival: the woman and the standing man wear garlands of flowers on their heads, and there is a pile of roses on bench, although the specific type of rose depicted was not developed until the 19th century.

The oil-on-canvas painting measures 91.8 cm × 183.5 cm (36.1 in × 72.2 in). It evokes ancient Greece but it is not intended to be historically accurate, although some critics date the scene to the end of the 7th century BC. In his 1905 book on Alma-Tadema, the journalist Percy Standing suggested that it may be considered as a companion picture to Alma-Tadema's Sappho and Alcaeus (1881), now in the Walters Art Museum, Baltimore.

== Reception ==
The painting was exhibited at the Royal Academy exhibition in 1885, and loaned for exhibition at the Metropolitan Museum of Art from 1890 to 1893, and then at the World's Columbian Exposition in 1893. Helen Zimmern wrote in 1888 that the treatment of human skin and light in A Reading from Homer is among Alma-Tadema's best work, and that "he has certainly never modeled anything more perfect than the figures of woman and lover".

According to Nina Athanassoglou-Kallmyer, A Reading from Homer is typical of a type of classicism that emerged in the middle of the 19th century. Unlike the lofty classicism of earlier painters such as Jacques-Louis David, this version focuses on mundane situations and typically does not derive its subject matter from a specific historical model or literary work. A Reading from Homer combines its ancient costumes and setting with modern-looking figures and a naturalistic environment. Simon Goldhill has compared it to the painting St. Cecilia (1895) by John William Waterhouse, writing that both works "focus on the enthralled gaze of artistic appreciation" and the "interplay between the sister arts of poetry, music, dance, and painting".

== Provenance ==
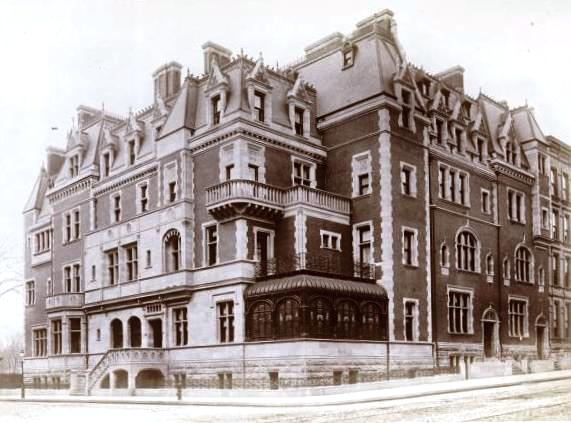
Home of Henry Gurdon Marquand in New York City, at the northwest corner of Madison Avenue and 68th Street, built in 1884 and later demolished

Before the painting was finished, Alma-Tadema was commissioned in 1884 to design the furnishings for Marquand's music room of his mansion in New York City, drawing visual inspiration from ancient Greece and Pompeii. A Reading from Homer was installed on a wall in this room, together with Amo Te, Ama Me, and items of furniture designed by Alma-Tadema including an extravagantly decorated inlaid piano. The room also had three ceiling paintings of the Muses commissioned from Frederic Leighton, one with Mnemosyne accompanying Melpomene and Thalia, and separate canvases depicting Terpsichore and Erato each with an attendant (it appears the main panel was broken up, and parts were sold in 2020 and 2021: all in private collections).

After Marquand suffered financial difficulties, he held a five-day sale in January 1903, at which the painting was sold for $30,000 (the most expensive item in the sale) and bought by Knoedler acting for the art collector George W. Elkins (1858–1919), son of William Lukens Elkins. Elkins bequeathed it to the Philadelphia Museum of Art, where it has been since 1924.

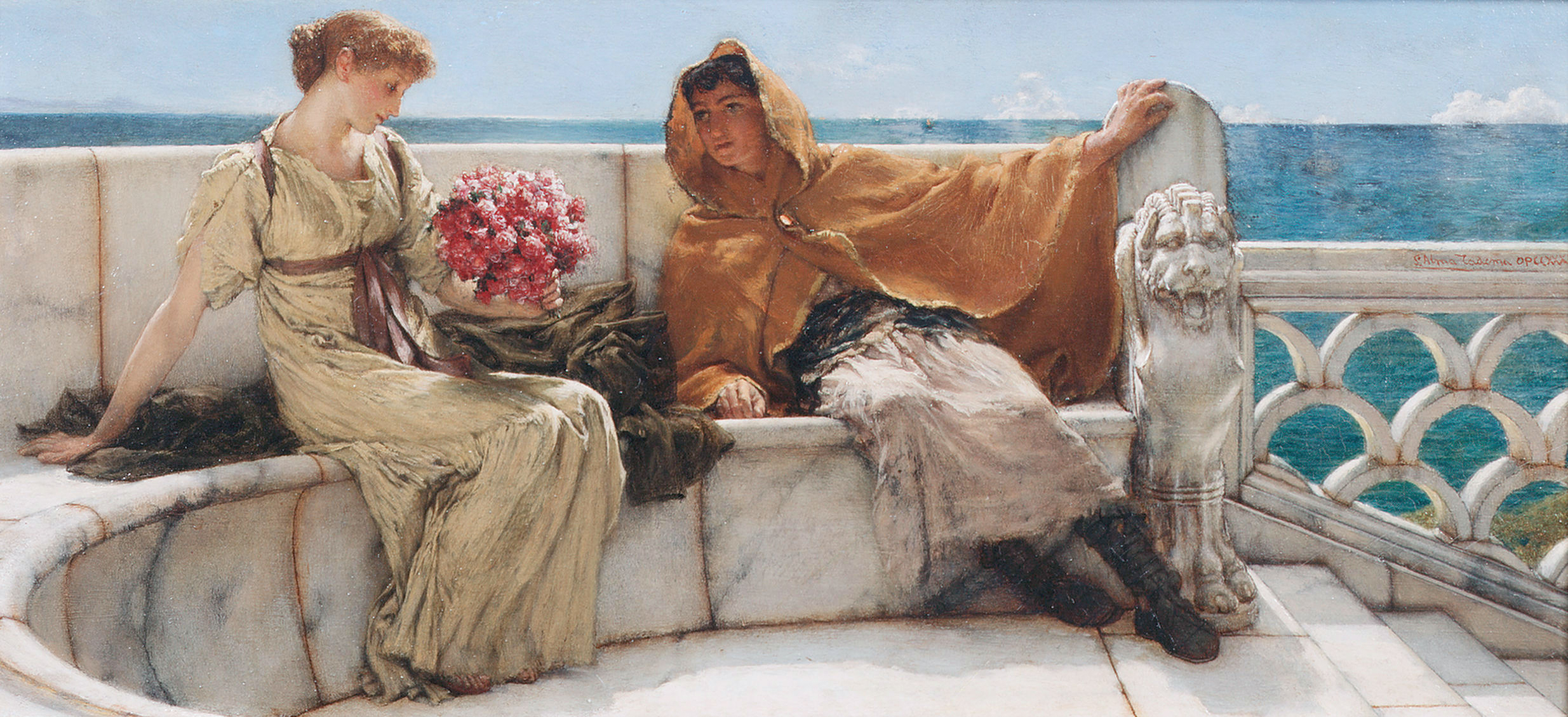
Lawrence Alma-Tadema, Amo Te, Ama Me, 1881, Fries Museum, Leeuwarden

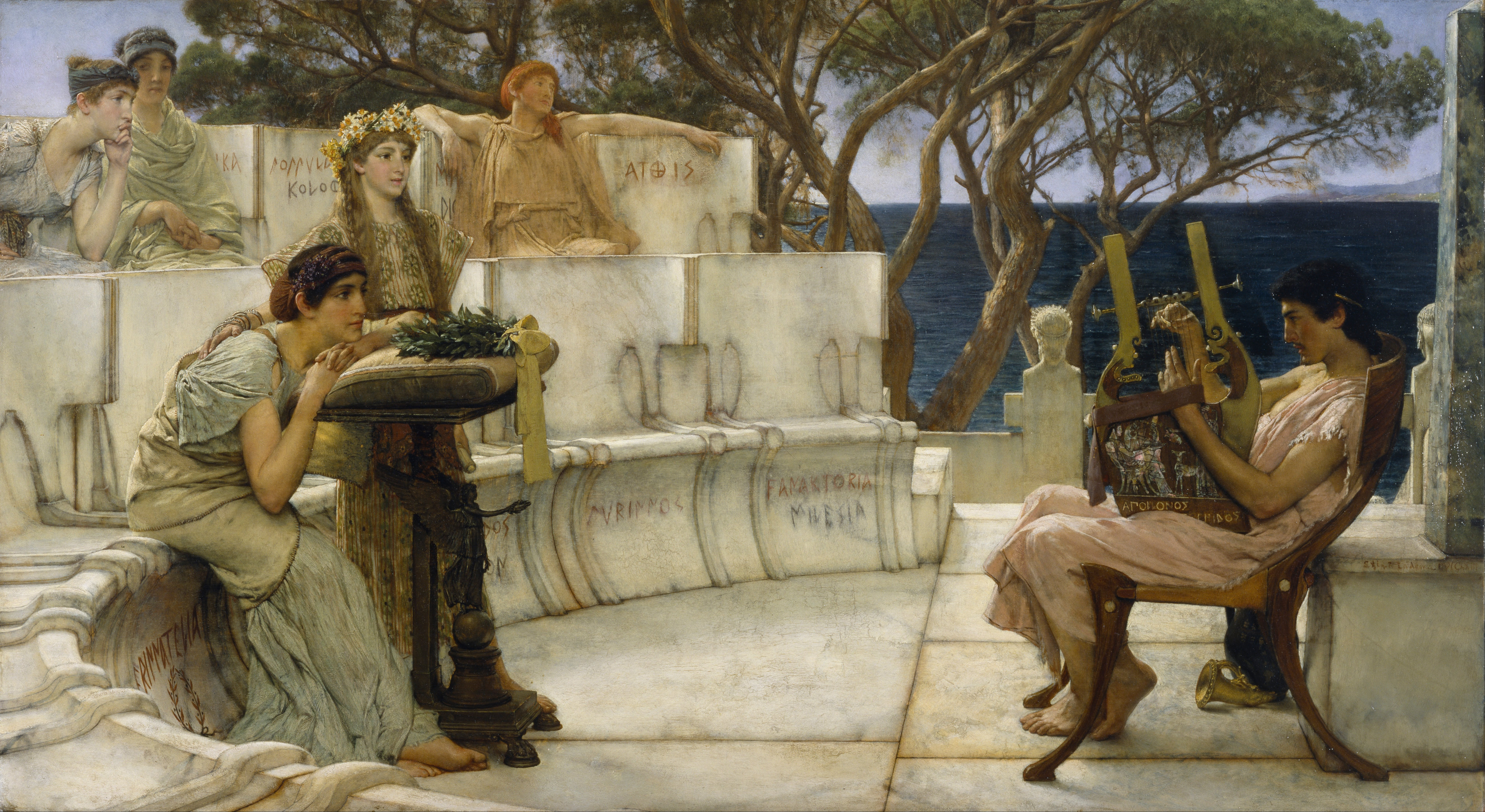
Lawrence Alma-Tadema, Sappho and Alcaeus, 1881, Walters Art Museum, Baltimore

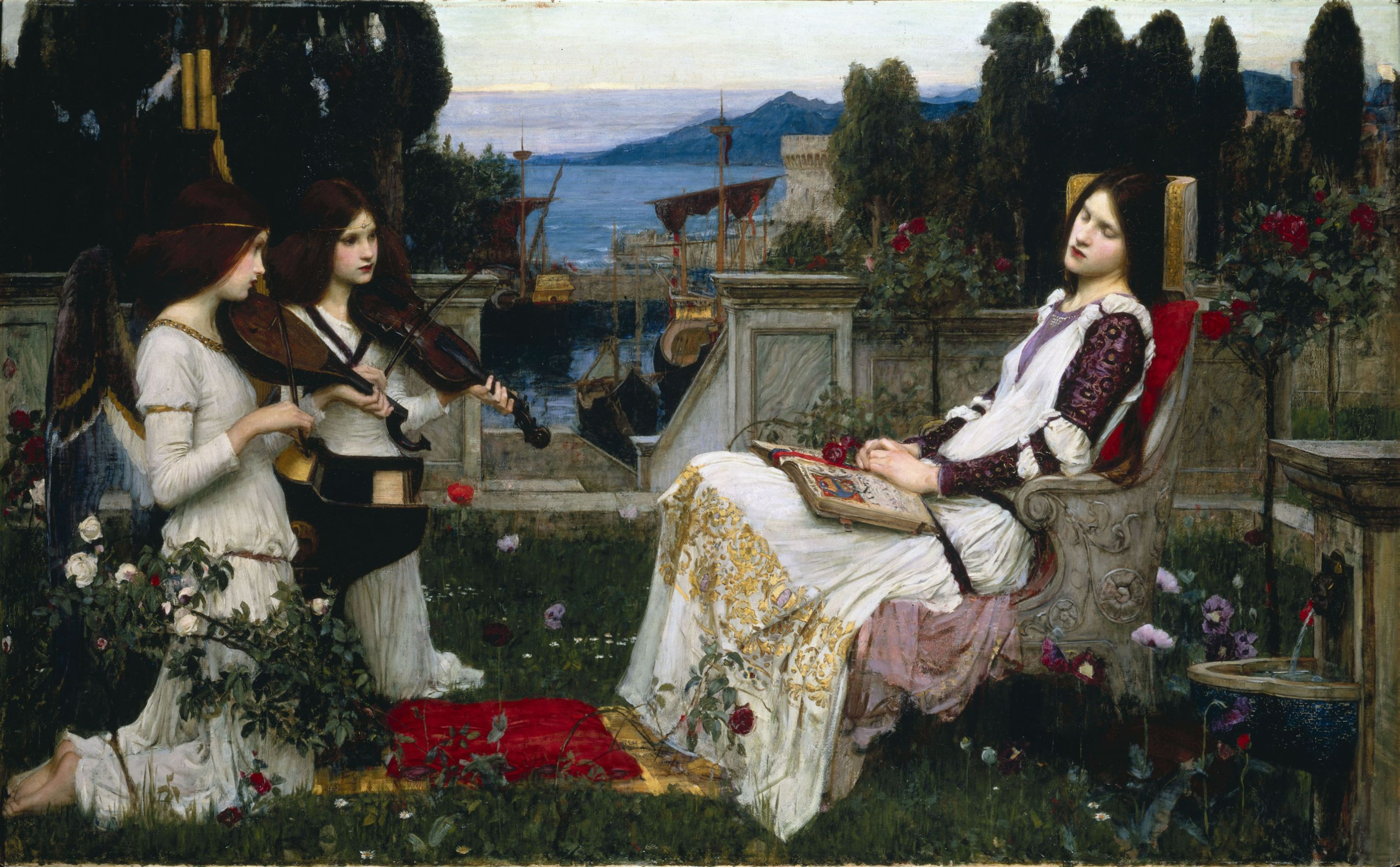
John William Waterhouse, Saint Cecilia, 1895, Andrew Lloyd Webber Art Foundation
