= The Great Bath at Bursa =

Painting by Jean-Léon Gérôme

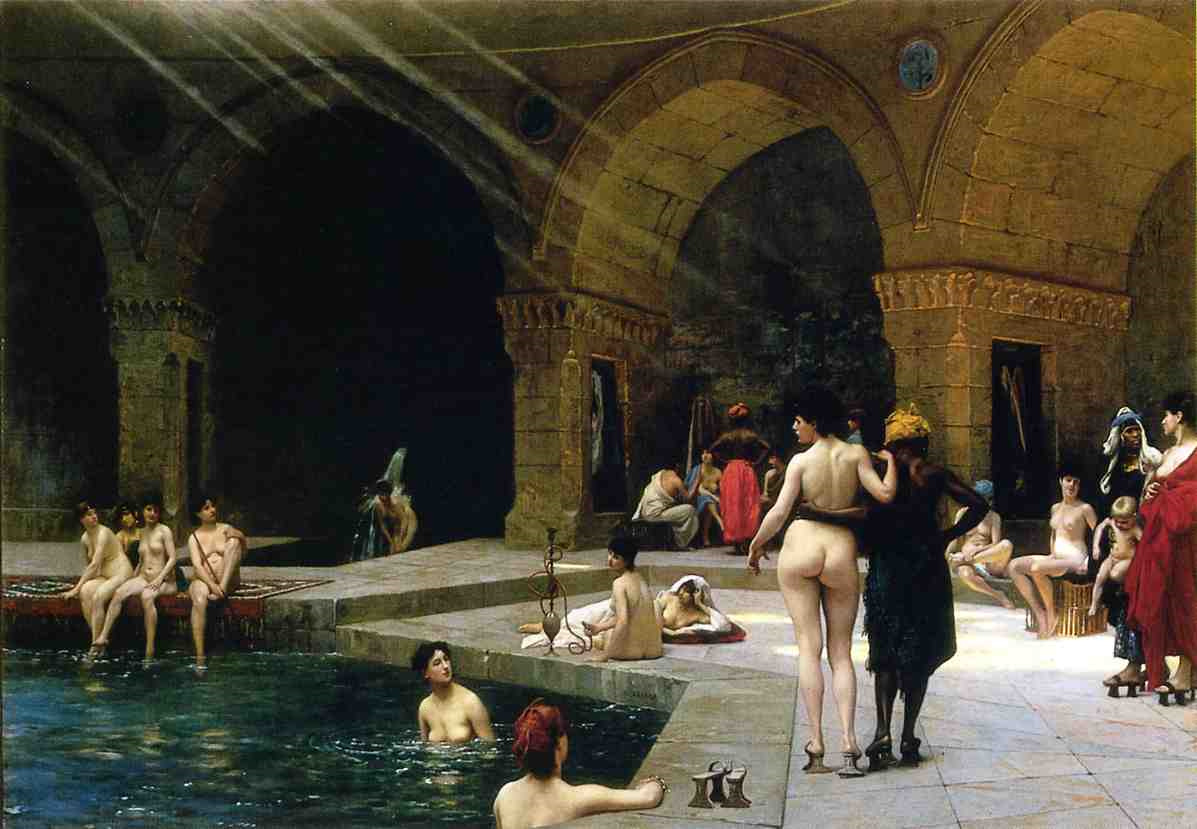
- Artist: Jean-Léon Gérôme
- Year: 1885
- Medium: Oil on canvas, academic art
- Dimensions: 70 cm × 100.5 cm (28 in × 39.6 in)
- Location: Private collection

The Great Bath at Bursa (French: La grande piscine de Brousse) is an 1885 oil painting by the French artist Jean-Léon Gérôme. It features a view inside the bathhouse in the western Turkish city of Bursa then in the Ottoman Empire. It combines Orientalist elements and the academic nude style then at the height of its popularity. It was displayed at the Salon of 1885 in Paris.

== Bibliography ==
- Emirbayer, Mustafa & Desmond, Matthew. The Racial Order. University of Chicago Press, 2015.
- Lewis, Leslie W. & Ardis, Ann L. Women's Experience of Modernity, 1875-1945. JHU Press, 2003.
- Smith, Alison. The Victorian Nude: Sexuality, Morality, and Art. Manchester University Press, 1996.
