= Schwa (art) =

Art style

Schwa is the underground conceptual artwork of Bill Barker (born 1957). Barker draws deceptively simple black and white stick figures and oblong alien ships. However, the artwork is not about the aliens: it is about how people react to the presence of the aliens and branding, and Barker uses them as a metaphor for foreign and unknown ideas. Schwa became an underground hit in the 1990s.

== Artwork and themes ==
In linguistics, a schwa is an unstressed and toneless neutral vowel sound in any language, often but not necessarily a mid-central vowel (rounded or unrounded). Such vowels are often transcribed with the symbol ə, regardless of their actual phonetic value. An example in English is the a in about.

For Barker, Schwa is alternately his pseudonym, a fictitious omnipresent corporation, a religion, or a resistance movement against corporate conspiracies and aliens. It is often a combination of all four at once.

Schwa artwork is black and white, with very precise stick-figures and ovoid alien faces and ships. The aliens themselves are rarely seen by the human stick figures, their presence is more often felt by their distant ships. The people are almost always either very frightened, or very complacent with their lot in life. Barker combines aliens, corporations, religions, media, and even the passage of time in his drawings.

The black and white drawings lead to a very hypnotic and very stark landscape. The world of Schwa is consistent throughout his work, and all the drawings and books combine to paint a single picture of a futuristic world run by large corporate and religious conglomerates who are possibly in league with omnipresent aliens. The media has become a marketing machine for these overseers, and they continually saturate the world with alien logos and messages such as "In the future, everything will work" and "Stop domesticating yourself".

== History ==
Schwa began in 1992 when Barker, a former advertising art director, was looking for a way to express himself with a single art style when he was given a copy of The Secret Government, a conspiracy book that tells of aliens controlling the government. Barker did not like the idea of art exhibitions, which he saw as just a pretentious form of merchandising, so he decided to sell merchandise directly to consumers by mail-order. Barker started selling trinkets like necklaces and stickers, and his first book, ə, exclusively through this home-grown business. Schwa cartoons also appeared in The Sagebrush, the University of Nevada, Reno student newspaper.

Although Barker might not have been the first person to conceive of the ovoid alien face, his version quickly became the best-known. His book was an underground hit, and received praise from Terry Gilliam, Ivan Stang, and Noam Chomsky. He bundled the book along with several trinkets as the Complete Schwa Kit (ISBN 0-9635914-1-X), and put out another book with trinkets as Complete Counter-Schwa Kit (ISBN 0-9635914-2-8).

Eventually his popularity led to a book deal with Chronicle Books, and in 1997 published Schwa: World Operations Manual (ISBN 0-8118-1585-4) a reference manual for world control that included postcards, stickers, warranties, contracts, and charts.

Barker also created and ran a (now defunct) labyrinthine website early in the days of the World Wide Web. He described it as "an experiment in building an online science fiction environment in HTML." Instead of simply showcasing his printed artwork, the website became another medium for Schwa fans to explore.

== Schwa Pyramid ==
Barker teamed up with AOL to create an online game exclusively for AOL members. He worked with the now-defunct Orbital Studios to create a game about conspiracies, corporations, and aliens. The initial instructions set the tone of the game:

Don't follow instructions. Suspect instructions. They are something to be wary of.

The player was a stick figure right in the middle of the darkened and conspiratorial world of Schwa. The player worked his way up the pyramid by collecting power through media, corporations, government, and labor, to eventually dominate the world.

The game launched on March 9, 1998. A follow-up game called Schwa Conspiracy was announced for later that year, but was never finished.

== Current status ==
Although a growing hit, Bill Barker disappeared from the public (and underground) eye sometime in late September 2001. His long-running website is dead and the post office box he had used for years now returns his mail unread.

In April 2008 a Schwa trademark was re-registered (assigned by Compuwatcher, Inc.) and a small series of websites were launched; this new Schwa business has no affiliation with Bill Barker or his artwork.

In March 2012 Barker created a Facebook page under the name alaVoid, which does not seem to be updated anymore.
