= Chula series =

Series of paintings by Juan Luna

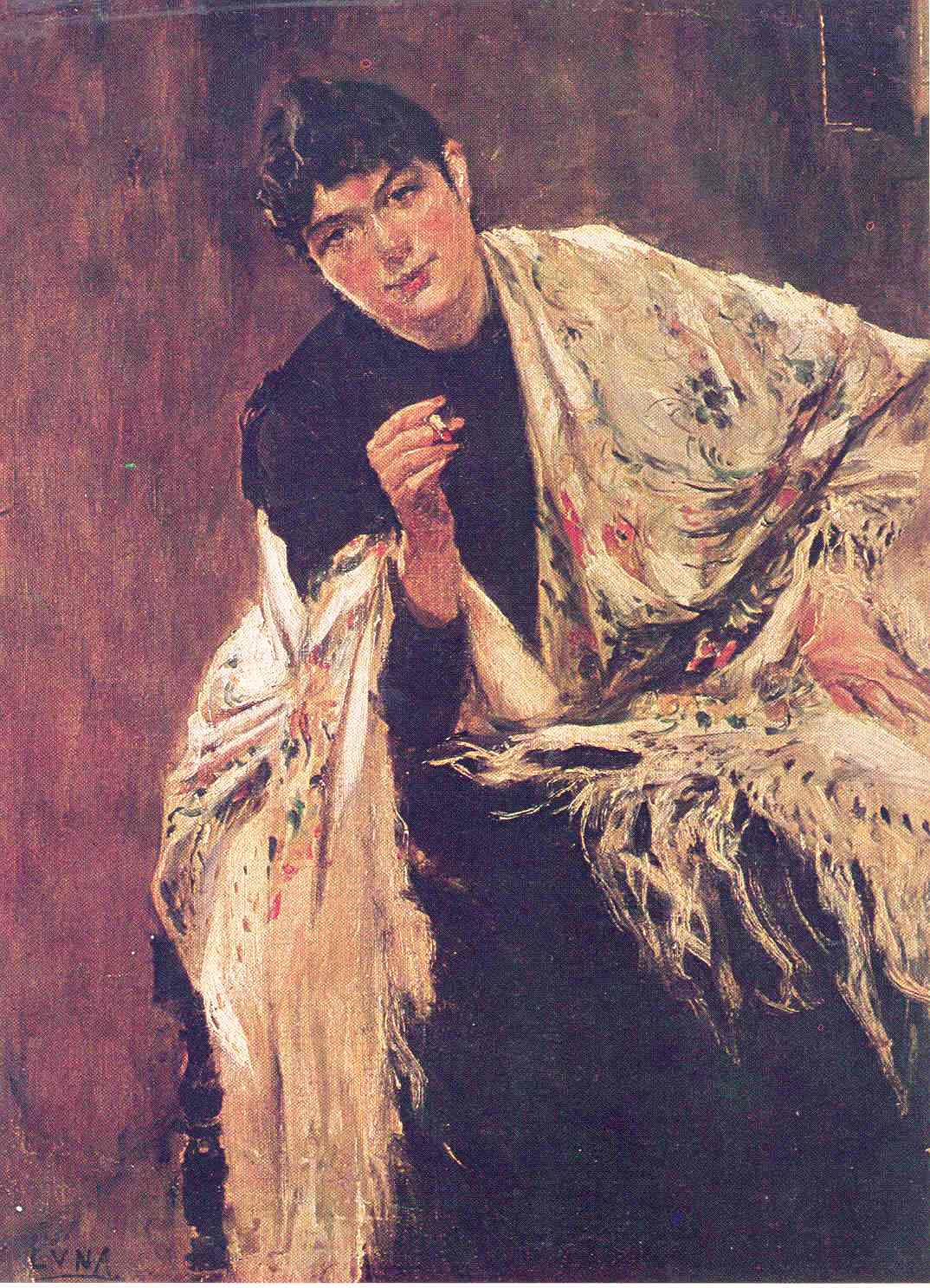
- Una Chula II, one of the paintings under the series.
- Artist: Juan Luna
- Year: 1885
- Location: Lopez Memorial Museum

The Chula series or Chula studies is a succession of paintings created by Filipino painter and revolutionary activist Juan Luna about the so-called "chulas" or working-class women of Madrid, Spain. Luna is well known for illustrating "striking and commercially lucrative" depictions of "women of the streets" of Madrid. Exemplars of these are Luna's Una Chula I ("A Chula" No. 1) and Una Chula II ("A Chula" No. 2) paintings.

== Definitions ==
Chulas refer to the barrio-bajo women, meaning "poor-district" or lower class Madrileñas of Spain. According to José Rizal, the Philippine national hero, chulas are attractive women with black, deep, and passionate eyes wearing mantillas and carrying fans, who are "always gracious", full of conflagration, affection, jealousy and "sometimes" of revenge.

== The Chula series ==
=== Una Chula I ===
The Una Chula I is an 1885 painting by Luna depicting a street woman from Madrid who is turning her head flirtatiously. The Madrileña is naughtily and alluringly looking back at the spectator. Her head is skewed coquettishly with a complicit facial appearance. The female's façade, body, and bosom are "playful" and indicating a pretense of "sexual promise".

=== Una Chula II ===
The Una Chula II ("A Chula" II) is an 1885 painting by Luna portraying another lower class Madrileña. The woman is sitting squarely with arms resting on a chair, a pose that "almost mannishly exuding (…) sexual confidence and worldliness". The woman is holding a lit cigarette between two fingers in a flirtatious way. The burning tip of the cigarette acts as an enhancement to the female's "painted lips" that supports a "slight smile". The woman is gazing towards the viewer of the painting unembarrassed suggesting a persuasive provocation.

== Description and comparison ==
According to one Spanish aficionado of Luna's paintings who was quoted by Graciano López Jaena, Luna's depictions of chulas are "real chulas who stupefy". The same connoisseur stated further that "Luna’s chulas are "free and easy chulas" that are witty and with facetiousness and swagger. Luna's portraits of chula women embodies the emergence of chulas who deserve admiration, one reason why Luna was successful in selling these types of paintings to rich friends and various commercial companies in Madrid and Paris.
