= William-Adolphe Bouguereau =

French academic painter (1825–1905)

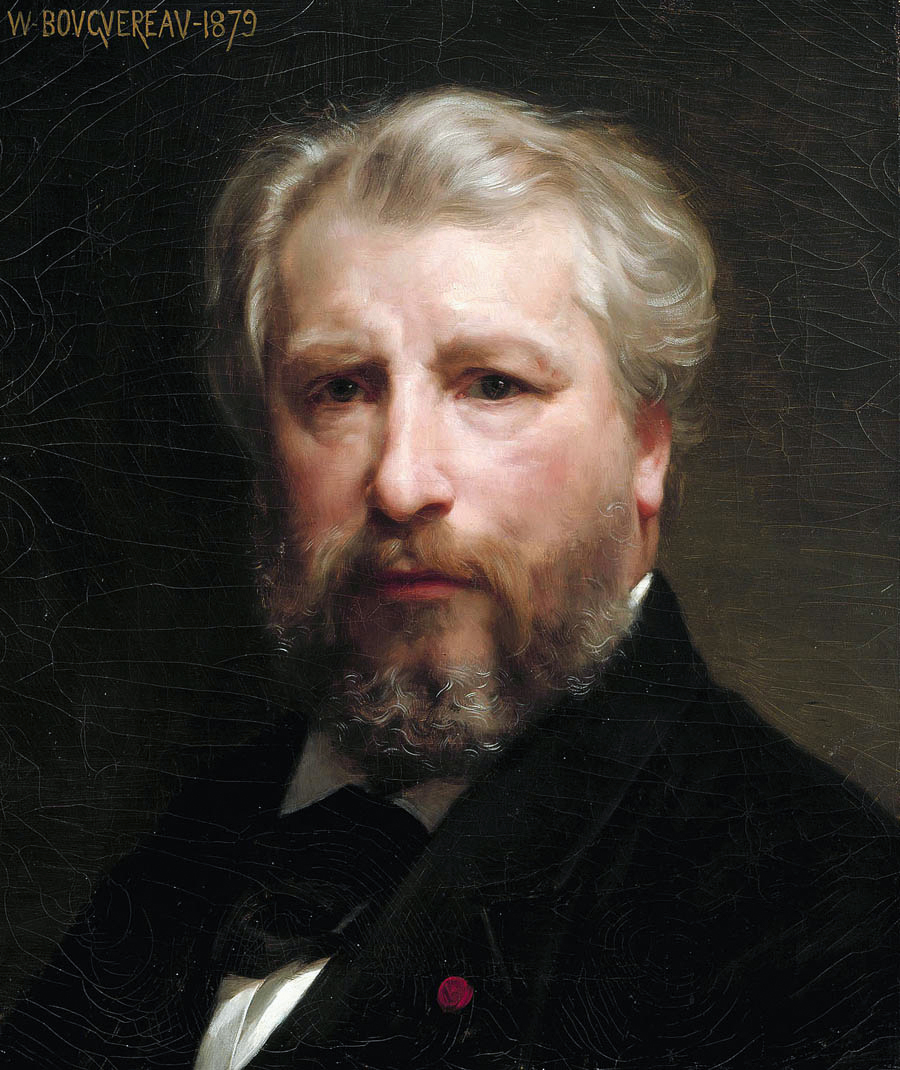
- Self-portrait (1879)
- Born: 30 November 1825; La Rochelle, France
- Died: 19 August 1905 (aged 79); La Rochelle, France
- Known for: Painter
- Notable work: The Birth of Venus; The Bohemian
- Movement: Realism, Academic art
- Spouses: Nelly Monchablon (m. 1866; died 1877) Elizabeth Jane Gardner (m. 1896)

William-Adolphe Bouguereau (French pronunciation: [wiljam adɔlf buɡ(ə)ʁo]; 30 November 1825 – 19 August 1905) was a French academic painter. In his realistic genre paintings, he used mythological themes, making modern interpretations of classical subjects, with an emphasis on the female human body. During his life, he enjoyed significant popularity in France and the United States, was given numerous official honors, and received top prices for his work. As the quintessential salon painter of his generation, he was reviled by the Impressionist avant-garde. By the early twentieth century, Bouguereau and his art fell out of favor with the public, due in part to changing tastes. In the 1980s, a revival of interest in figure painting led to a rediscovery of Bouguereau and his work. He finished 822 known paintings, but the whereabouts of many are unknown.

== Life and career ==
=== Formative years ===
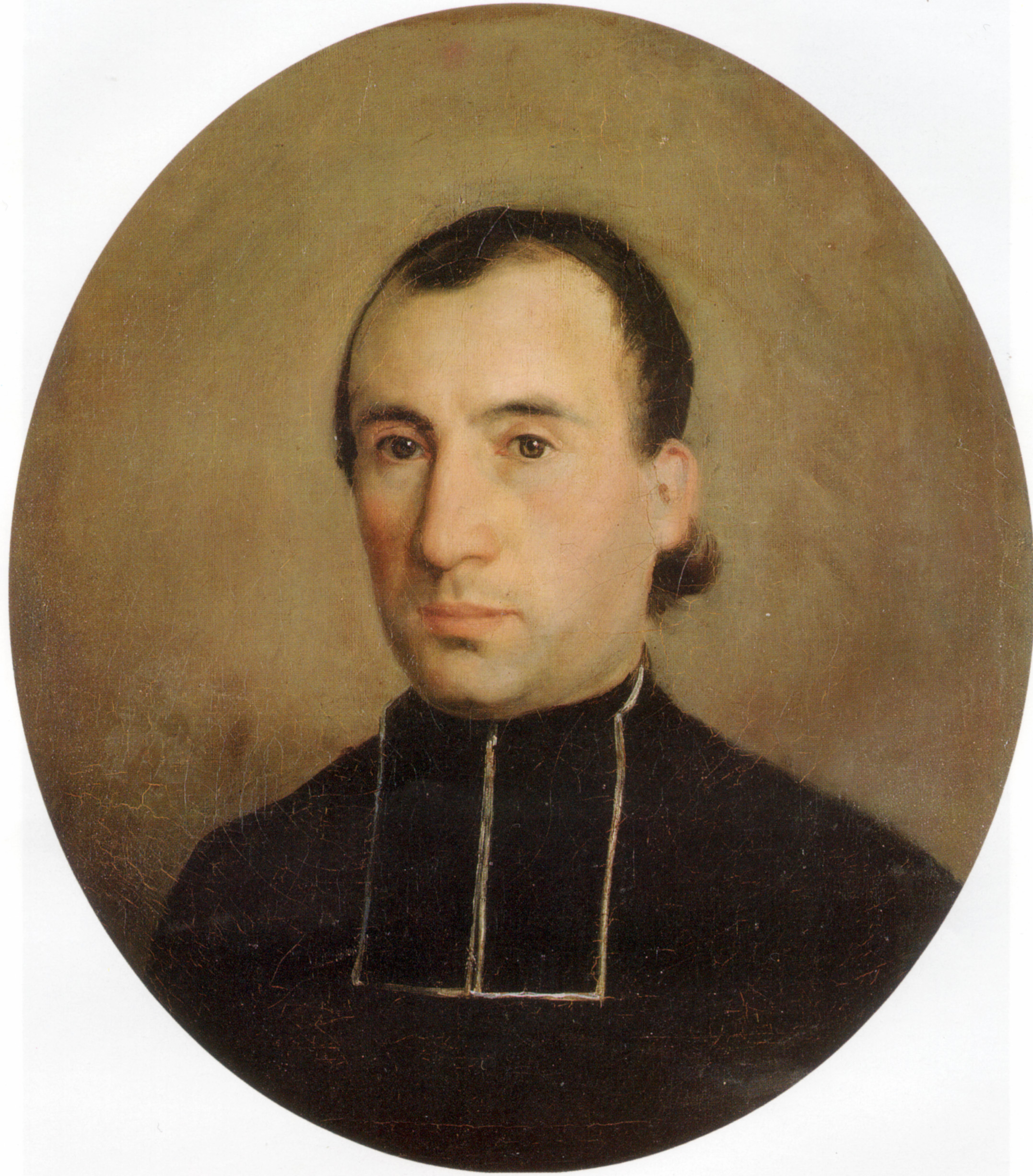
A portrait of Eugène Bouguereau (1850)

William-Adolphe Bouguereau was born in La Rochelle, France, on 30 November 1825, into a family of wine and olive oil merchants. The son of Théodore Bouguereau (born 1800) and Marie Bonnin (1804), known as Adeline, William was brought up a Roman Catholic. He had an elder brother, Alfred, and a younger sister, Marie (known as Hanna), who died when she was seven. The family moved to Saint-Martin-de-Ré in 1832. Another sibling, Kitty, was born in 1834. At the age of twelve, Bouguereau went to Mortagne-sur-Gironde to stay with his uncle Eugène, a priest, and developed a love of nature, religion, and literature. In 1839, he was sent to study for the priesthood at a Catholic college in Pons. Here he learned to draw and paint from Louis Sage, who had studied under Ingres. Bouguereau then reluctantly left his studies to return to his family, now residing in Bordeaux. There he met a local artist, Charles Marionneau, and commenced at the Municipal School of Drawing and Painting in November 1841. Bouguereau also worked as a shop assistant, hand-colouring lithographs and making small paintings that were reproduced using chromolithography. He was soon the best pupil in his class and decided to become an artist in Paris. To fund the move, he sold portraits – 33 oils in three months. All were unsigned and only one has been traced. In 1845, he returned to Mortagne to spend more time with his uncle. He arrived in Paris in March 1846, aged twenty.

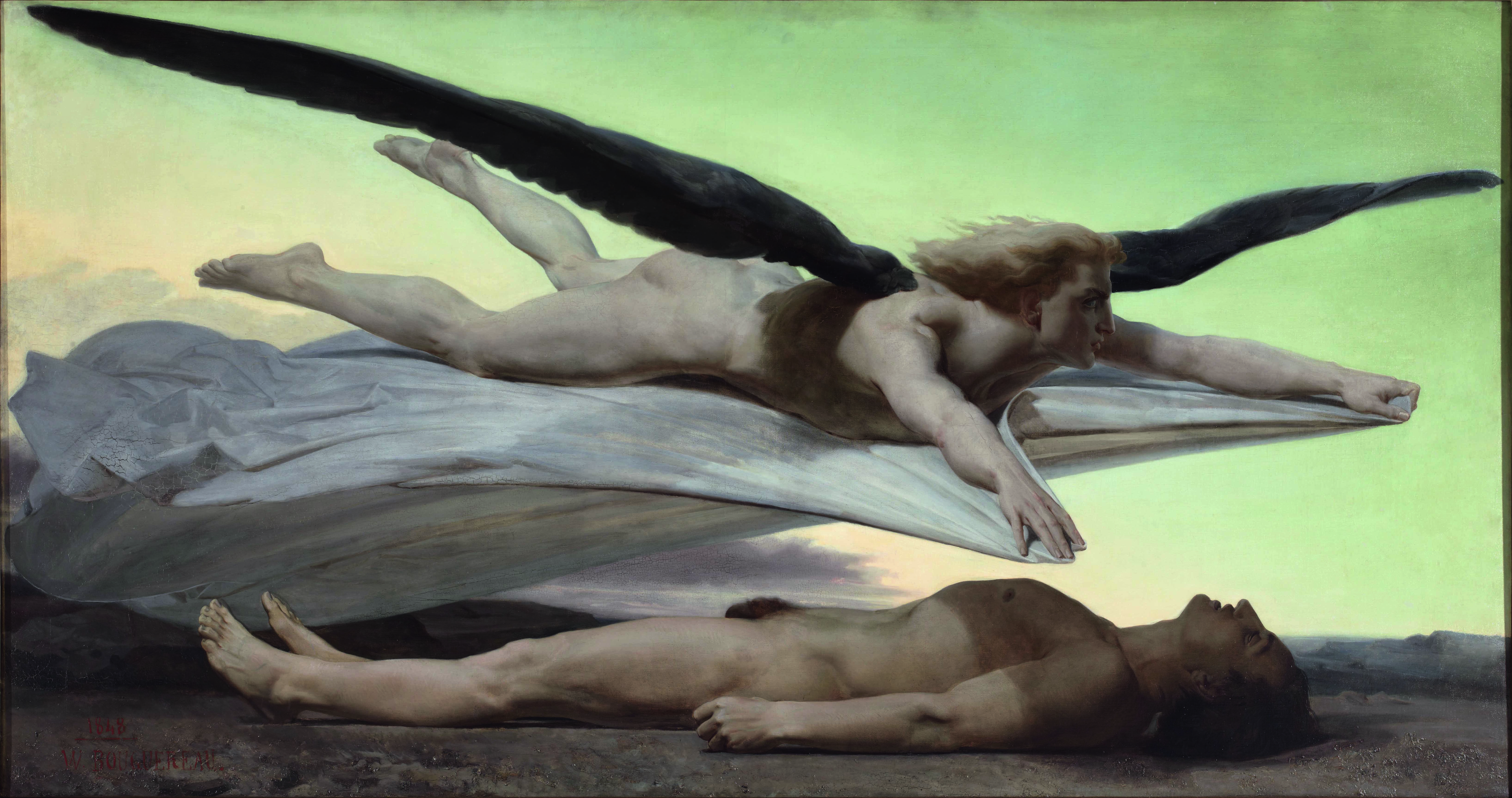
Égalité devant la mort (Equality Before Death), 1848, oil on canvas, 141 × 269 cm (55.5 × 105.9 in), Musée d'Orsay, Paris. Equality is Bouguereau's first major painting, produced after two years at the École des Beaux-Arts de Paris at the age of 23.

Bouguereau became a student at the École des Beaux-Arts. To supplement his formal training in drawing, he attended anatomical dissections and studied historical costumes and archeology. He was admitted to the studio of François-Édouard Picot, where he studied painting in the academic style. Dante and Virgil in Hell (1850) was an early example of his neo-classical works. Academic painting placed the highest status on historical and mythological subjects and Bouguereau determined to win the Prix de Rome, which would gain him a three-year residence at the Villa Medici in Rome, Italy, where, in addition taking formal lessons, he could study firsthand the Renaissance artists and their masterpieces, as well as Greek, Etruscan, and Roman antiquities.

=== Villa Medici, Rome 1851–1854 ===
The young artist entered the Prix de Rome contest in April 1848. Soon after work began there were riots in Paris, and Bouguereau enrolled in the National Guard. After an unsuccessful attempt to win the prize, he entered again in 1849. Following 106 days of competition, he again failed to win. His third attempt commenced unsuccessfully in April 1850 with Dante and Virgil but five months later, he heard he had won a joint first prize for Shepherds Find Zenobia on the Banks of the Araxes.

Along with other category winners, he set off for Rome in December and finally arrived at the Villa Medici in January 1851. Bouguereau explored the city, making sketches and watercolours as he went. He also studied classical literature, which influenced his subject choice for the rest of his career. He walked to Naples and on to Capri, Amalfi, and Pompeii. Still based in Rome and working hard on course work, there were more explorations of Italy in 1852. Although he had a strong admiration for all traditional art, he particularly revered Greek sculpture, Leonardo da Vinci, Raphael, Michelangelo, Titian, Rubens, and Delacroix. In April 1854, he left Rome and returned to La Rochelle.

=== Height of career ===
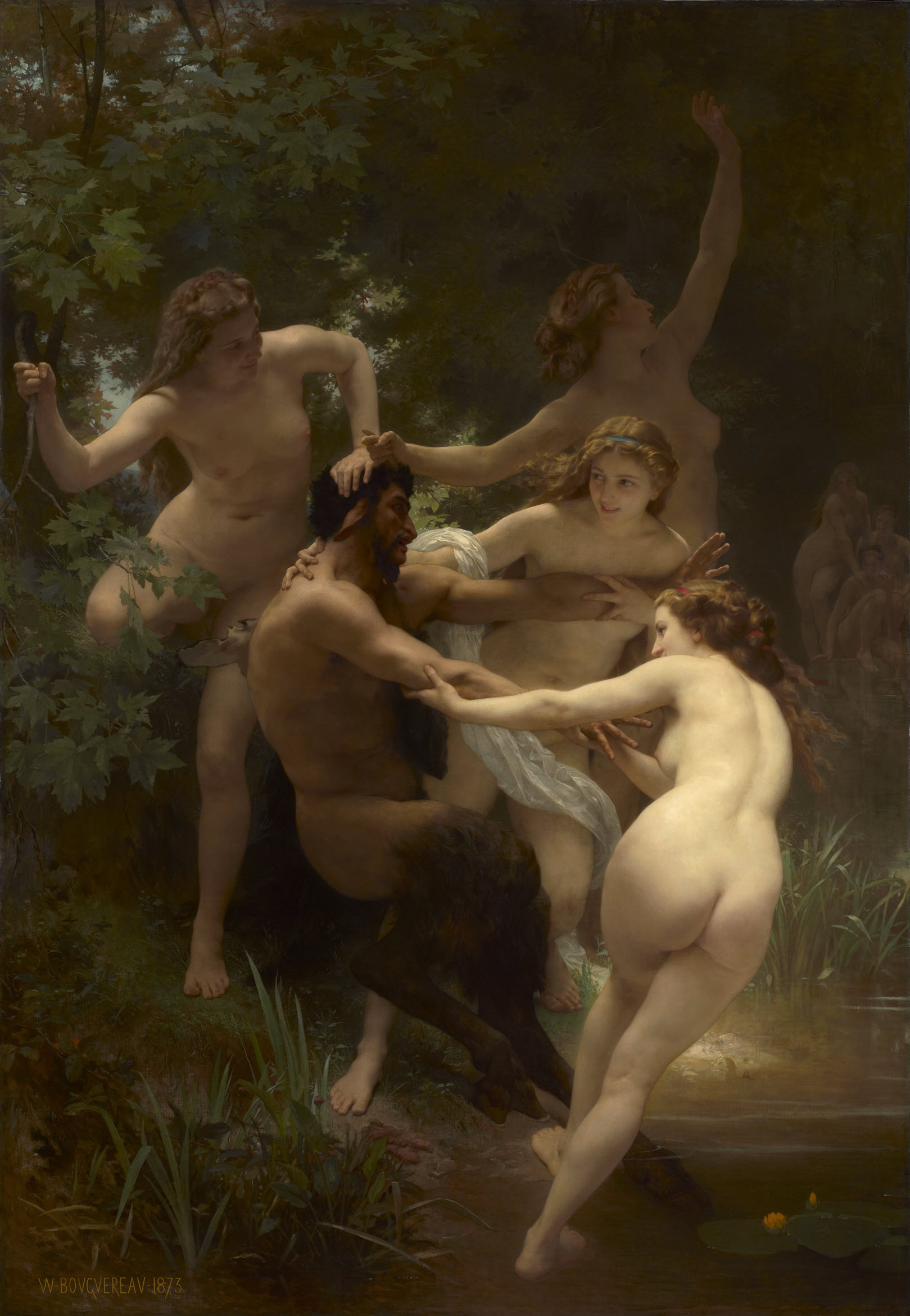
Nymphs and Satyr, 1873, oil on canvas, 260 × 180 cm (102.4 × 70.9 in), Clark Art Institute

Bouguereau, painting within the traditional academic style, exhibited at the annual exhibitions of the Paris Salon for his entire working life. An early reviewer stated, "M. Bouguereau has a natural instinct and knowledge of contour. The eurythmie of the human body preoccupies him, and in recalling the happy results which, in this genre, the ancients and the artists of the sixteenth century arrived at, one can only congratulate M. Bouguereau in attempting to follow in their footsteps ... Raphael was inspired by the ancients ... and no one accused him of not being original."

Raphael was a favourite of Bouguereau and he took this review as a high compliment. He had fulfilled one of the requirements of the Prix de Rome by completing an old-master copy of Raphael's The Triumph of Galatea. In many of his works, he followed the same classical approach to composition, form, and subject matter. Bouguereau's graceful portraits of women were considered very charming, partly because he could beautify a sitter while also retaining her likeness.

Although Bouguereau spent most of his life in Paris, he returned to La Rochelle again and again throughout his professional life. He was revered in the town of his birth and undertook decorating commissions from local citizens. From the early 1870s, he and his family spent every summer in La Rochelle. In 1882, he decided that rather than rent he would purchase a house, as well as local farm buildings. By August of that year, the family's permanent summer base was on the rue Verdière. The artist commenced several paintings here and completed them in his Paris studio.

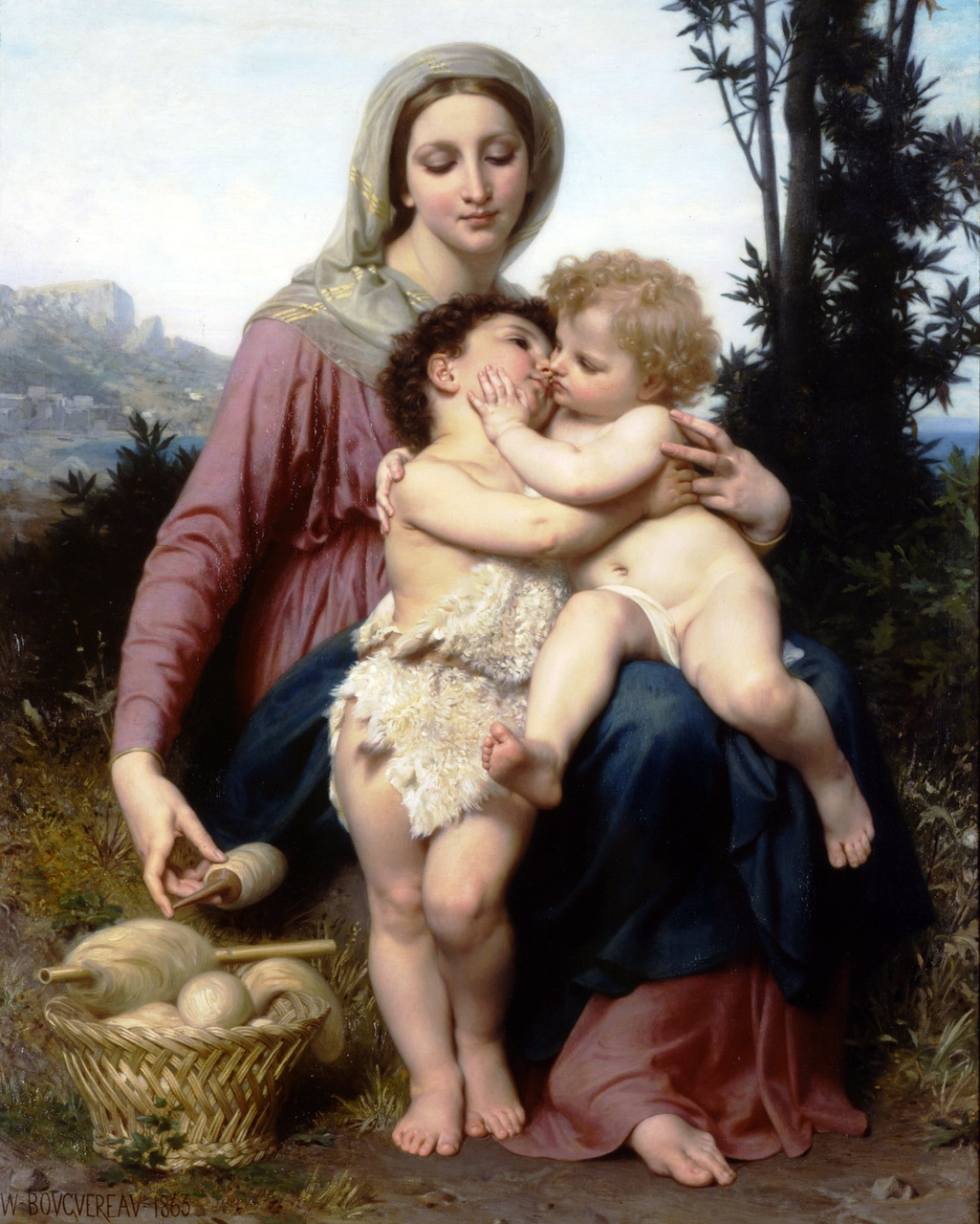
The Holy Family (1863)

Bouguereau flourished after his Villa Medici residence. In 1854–55 he decorated a pavilion at the grand house of a cousin in Angoulins, including four large paintings of figures depicting the seasons. He was happy to undertake other commissions to pay off the debts he accrued in Italy and to help his penniless mother. He decorated a mansion with nine large paintings of allegorical figures. In 1856, the Ministry of State for Fine Arts commissioned him to paint Emperor Napoleon III Visiting the Victims of the Tarascon Flood. During this period he also created decorations for the chapel at Saint-Clotilde. He received the Legion of Honour on 12 July 1859. By this time, Bouguereau was turning away from history painting and lengthy commissions to work on more personal paintings, with realistic and rustic themes.

By the late 1850s, he had made strong connections with art dealers, particularly Paul Durand-Ruel (later the champion of the Impressionists), who helped clients buy paintings from artists who exhibited at the Salons. Thanks to Durand-Ruel, Bouguereau met Hugues Merle, who later often was compared to Bouguereau. The Salons annually drew over 300,000 people, providing valuable exposure to exhibited artists. Bouguereau's fame extended to England by the 1860s. Three paintings were shown at the 1863 Salon and Holy Family (now at Chimei Museum) was sold to Napoleon III, who presented it to his wife the Empress Eugénie, who hung it in her Tuileries Palace apartment.

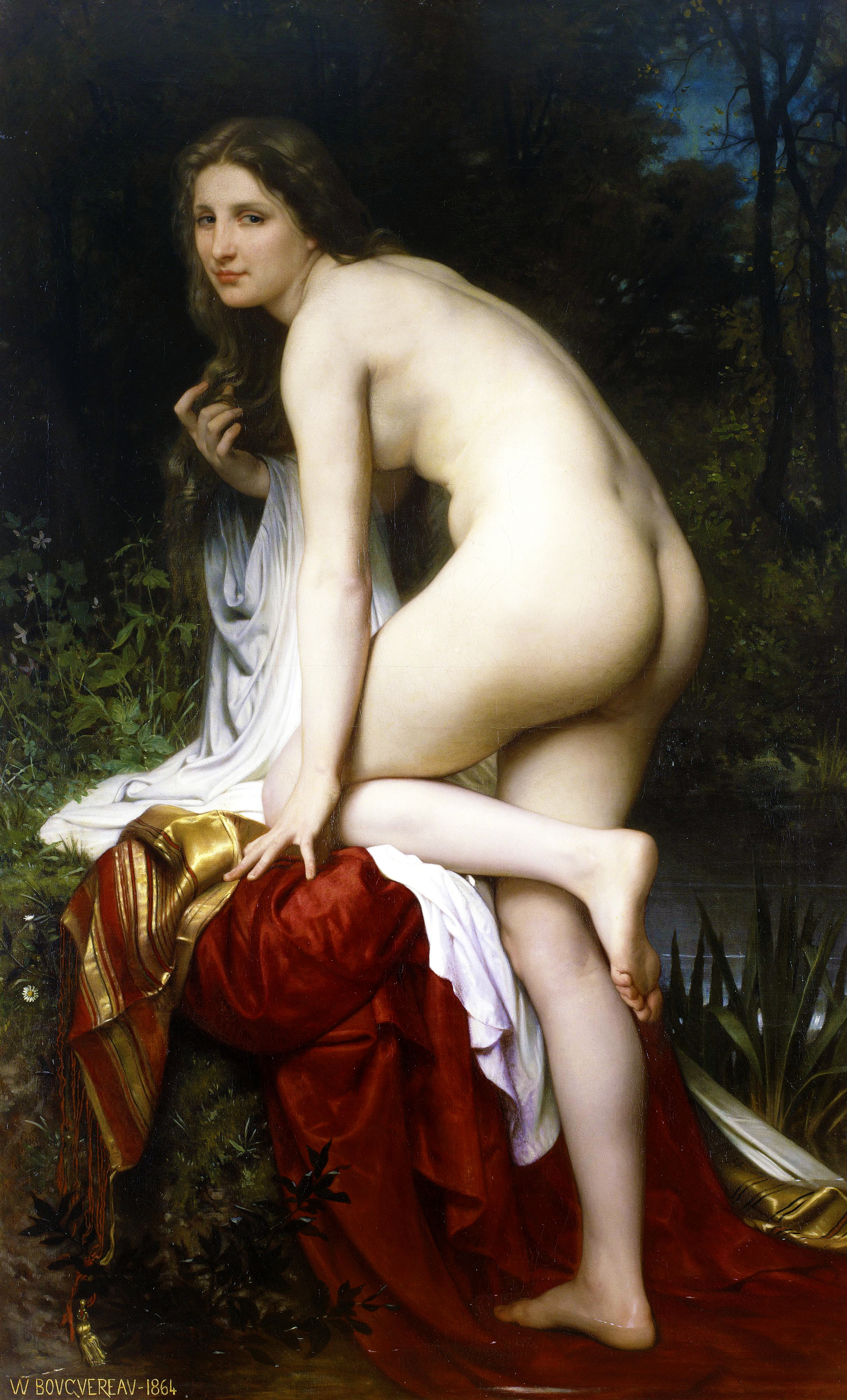
The Bather (1864)

Bather (1864) was submitted to an exhibition in Ghent, Belgium. It was a spectacular success and purchased by the museum at great expense. At this time, William took on decorative work at the Grand Théâtre, Bordeaux, which lasted four years. In 1875, with assistants, he began work on a La Rochelle chapel ceiling, producing six paintings on copper over the next six years. Once installed in the city in summer 1875 he began Pietà, one of his greatest religious paintings and shown at the 1876 Salon, in tribute to his son Georges. At the behest of King William III of the Netherlands, Bouguereau went to Het Loo Palace in May 1876. The king admired the artist and they spent intimate times together. In May 1878 the Paris Universal Exhibition opened to showcase French work. Bouguereau found and borrowed twelve of his paintings from their owners, including his new work Nymphaeum.

Bouguereau was a staunch traditionalist whose genre paintings and mythological themes were modern interpretations of Classical subjects, both pagan and Christian, with a concentration on the naked female form. The idealized world of his paintings brought to life goddesses, nymphs, bathers, shepherdesses, and madonnas in a way that appealed to wealthy art patrons of the era.

Bouguereau employed traditional methods of working up a painting, including detailed pencil studies and oil sketches, and his careful method resulted in a pleasing and accurate rendering of the human form. His painting of skin, hands, and feet was particularly admired. He also used some of the religious and erotic symbolism of the Old Masters, such as the "broken pitcher" which connoted lost innocence.

Bouguereau received many commissions to decorate private houses and public buildings, and, early on, this added to his prestige and fame. As was typical of such commissions, he would sometimes paint in his own style, and at other times conform to an existing group style. He also made reductions of his public paintings for sale to patrons, of which The Annunciation (1888) is an example. He was also a successful portrait painter and many of his paintings of wealthy patrons remain in private hands.

=== Académie Julian ===
From the 1860s, Bouguereau was closely associated with the Académie Julian where he gave lessons and advice to art students, male and female, from around the world. During several decades he taught drawing and painting to hundreds, if not thousands, of students. Many of them managed to establish artistic careers in their own countries, sometimes following his academic style, and in other cases, rebelling against it, like Henri Matisse. He married his famous pupil, Elizabeth Jane Gardner, after the death of his first wife.

Bouguereau received many honors from the academy: he became a Life Member in 1876; received the Grand Medal of Honour in 1885; was appointed Commander of the Legion of Honor in 1885; and was made Grand Officier of the Legion of Honour in 1905. He began to teach drawing at the Académie Julian in 1875. The academy was a co-ed art institution independent of the École des Beaux-Arts, with no entrance exams and nominal fees.

=== Wives and children ===
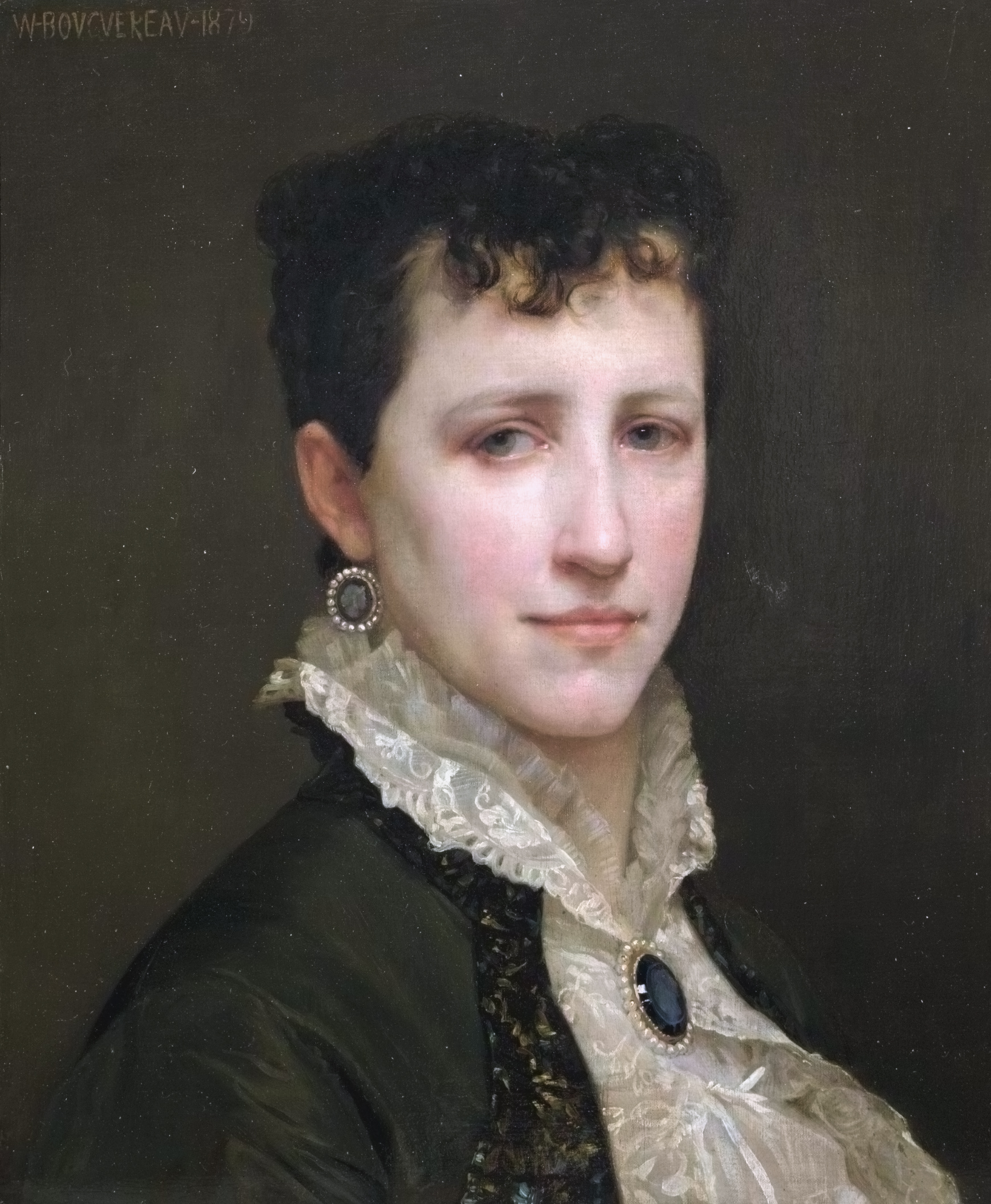
Portrait by Bouguereau of his wife Elizabeth Jane Gardner, Chimei Museum, Tainan, Taiwan

In 1856, William began living with one of his models, Marie-Nelli Monchablon, a 19-year-old, born 15 Nov 1836 in Lisle-en-Rigault. Living together unmarried, the pair kept their liaison a secret. Their first child, Henriette, was born in April 1857; Georges was born in January 1859. A third child, Jeanne, was born 25 December 1861. The couple married quietly (as many assumed they were already married) on 24 May 1866. Eight days later, Jeanne died from tuberculosis. In mourning, the couple went to La Rochelle, and Bouguereau made a painting of her in 1868. A fourth child, Adolphe (known as Paul), was born in October 1868. Aged 15, Georges' health suffered, and his mother took him away from the bad air of Paris. However, he died on 19 June 1875. Nelly had a fifth child in 1876, Maurice, but her health was declining and the doctors suspected that she had contracted tuberculosis. Aged 40, Nelly died on 3 April 1877; baby Maurice died two months later.

The artist planned to marry Elizabeth Jane Gardner, a pupil whom he had known for ten years, but his mother was opposed to the idea. Soon after Nelly's death, she made Bouguereau swear he would not remarry within her lifetime. After his mother's death, and after a nineteen-year engagement, he and Gardner married in Paris in June 1896. His wife continued to work as his private secretary, and helped to organize the household staff. His son Paul contracted tuberculosis in early 1899; Paul, his stepmother, and Bouguereau went to Menton in the south. When the stay was prolonged, the artist found a room in which to paint. Paul died at his father's house in April 1900, aged 32. Bouguereau had outlived four of his five children: only Henriette outlived him. Elizabeth, who was with her husband to the end, died in Paris in January 1922.

=== Homes ===
When Bouguereau arrived in Paris in March 1846, he resided at the Hotel Corneille at 5 rue Corneille. In 1855, after his stay in Rome, he lived at 27 rue de Fleurus, and the following year rented a fourth-floor studio at 3 rue Carnot, near his apartment. In 1866, the year of his marriage to Nelly, he bought a vast plot of land on the rue Notre-Dame-des-Champs, and an architect was commissioned to design a grand house with a top-floor studio. The family was installed in 1868, together with five servants and with his mother, Adeline, visiting daily. Bouguereau spent the rest of his life there and at La Rochelle.

=== Later years and death ===
Bouguereau was an assiduous painter, often completing twenty or more easel paintings in a single year. Even during the twilight years of his life, he would rise at dawn to work on his paintings six days a week and would continue painting until nightfall. Throughout the course of his lifetime, he is known to have painted at least 822 paintings. Many of these paintings have been lost. Near the end of his life he described his love of his art: "Each day I go to my studio full of joy; in the evening when obliged to stop because of darkness I can scarcely wait for the next morning to come ... if I cannot give myself to my dear painting I am miserable."

In the spring of 1905, Bouguereau's house and studio in Paris were burgled. On 19 August 1905, aged 79, Bouguereau died in La Rochelle from heart disease. There was an outpouring of grief in the town of his death. After a Mass at the cathedral, his body was placed on a train to Paris for a second ceremony. Bouguereau was laid to rest with Nelly and his children at the family vault at Montparnasse Cemetery.

== Notable works ==
Depictions of women in classical themes

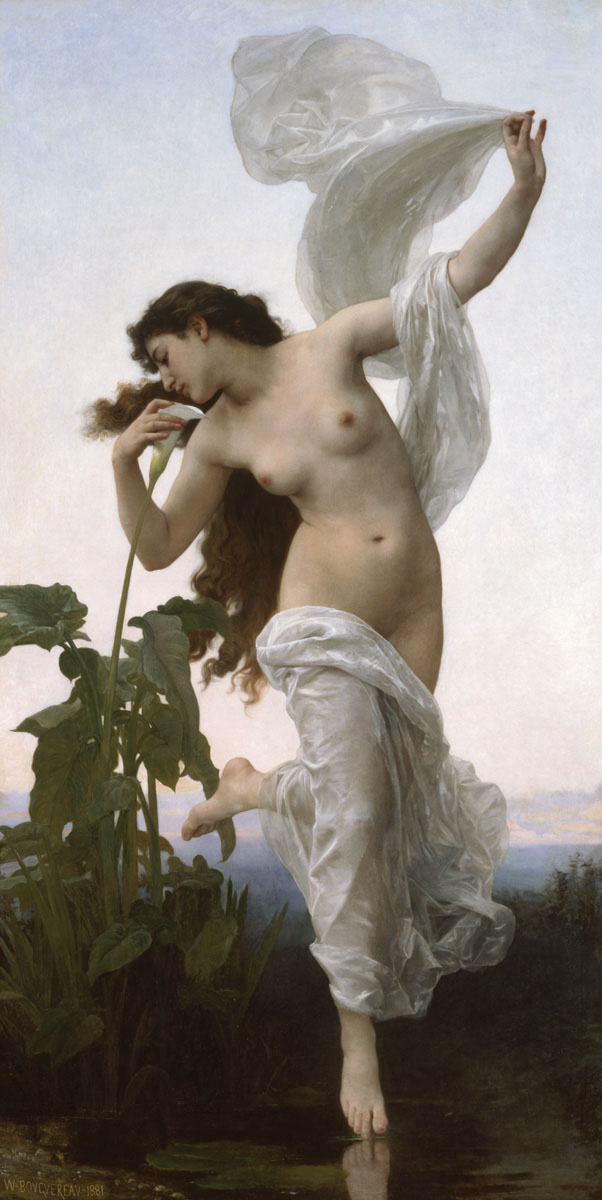
L'Aurore or Dawn (1881)

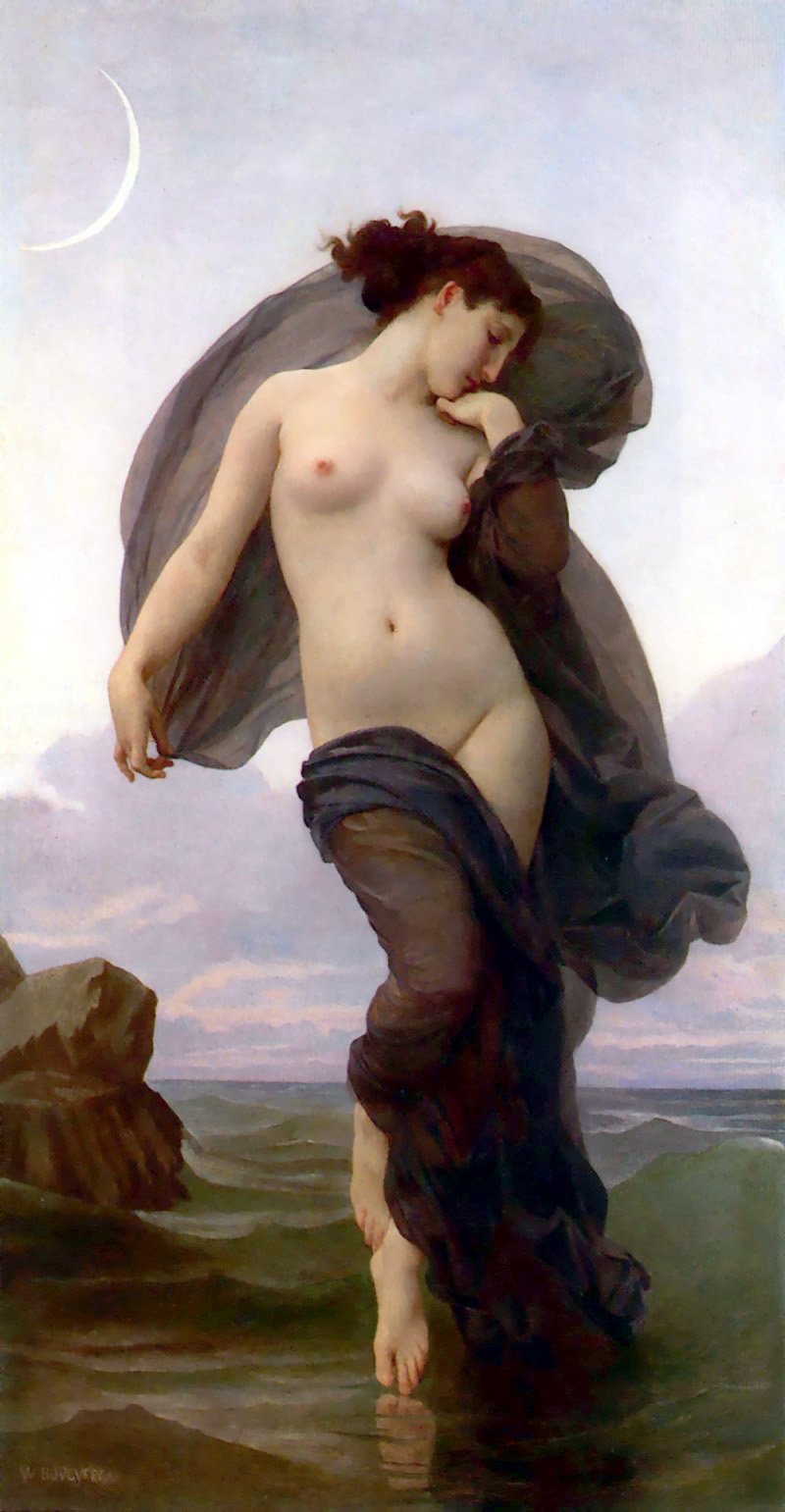
Le Crépuscule or Dusk (1882)

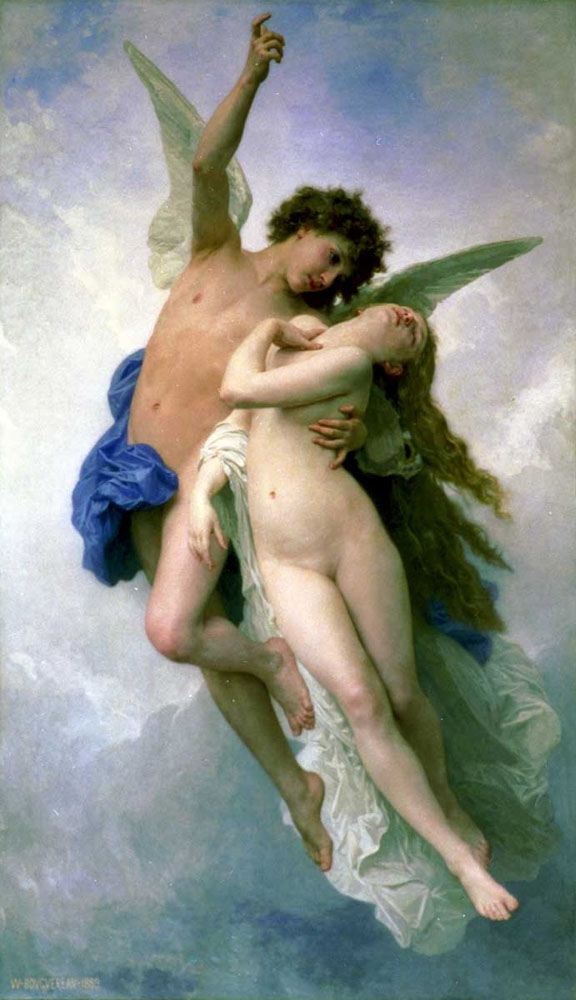
Psyche et L'Amour (1889)

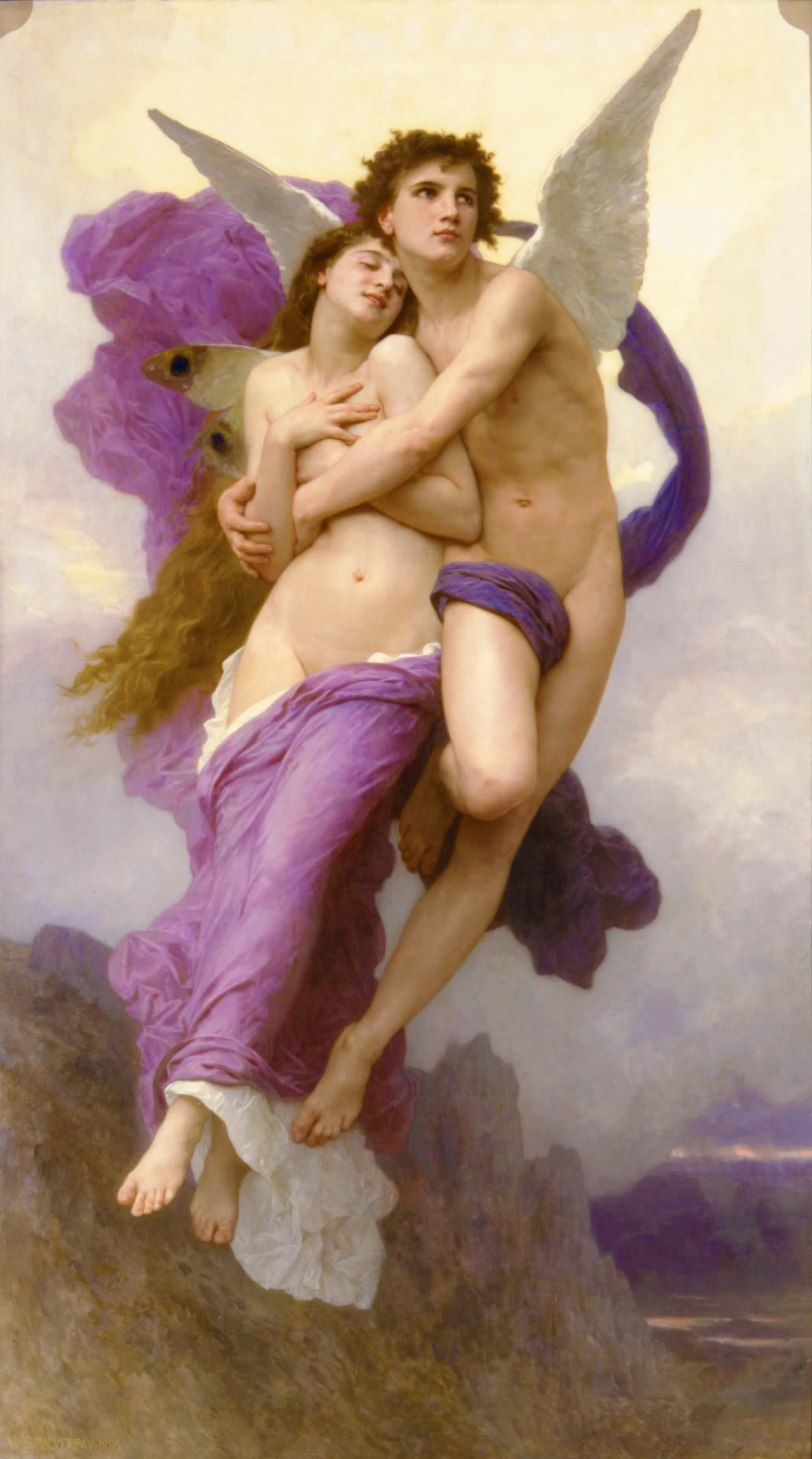
The Abduction of Psyche (1895)

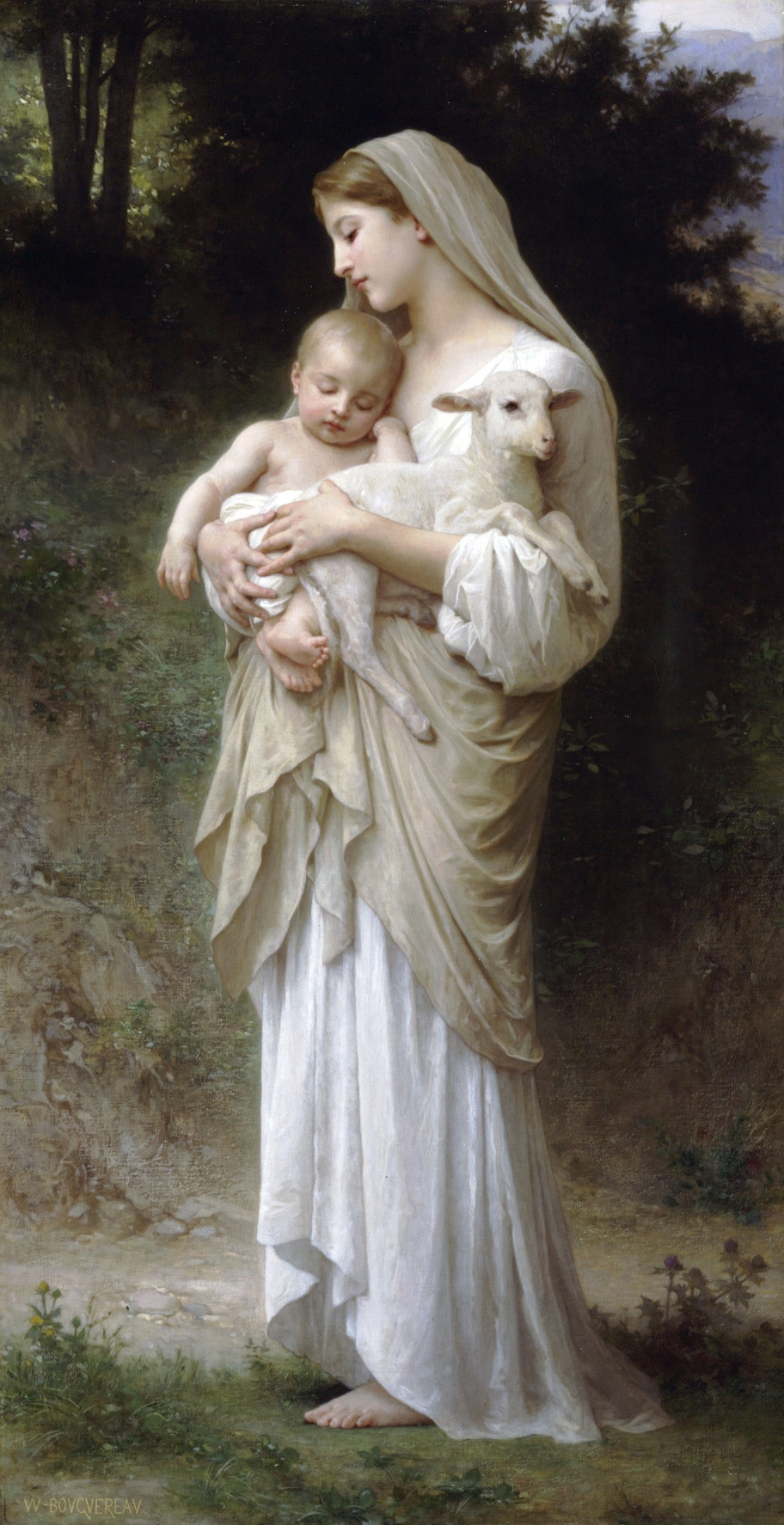
Innocence (1893)

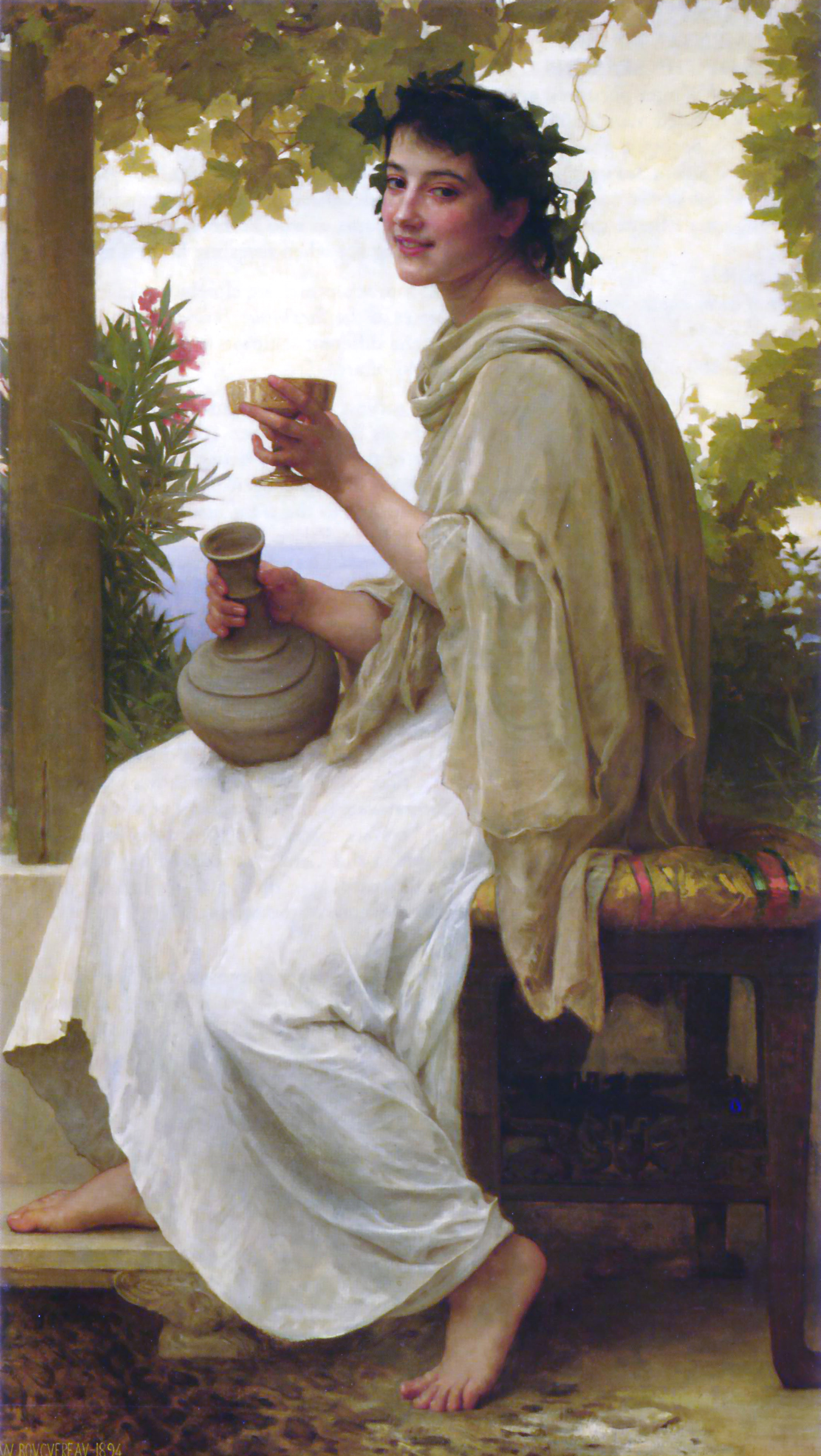
Bacchante (1894)
Depictions of nude women

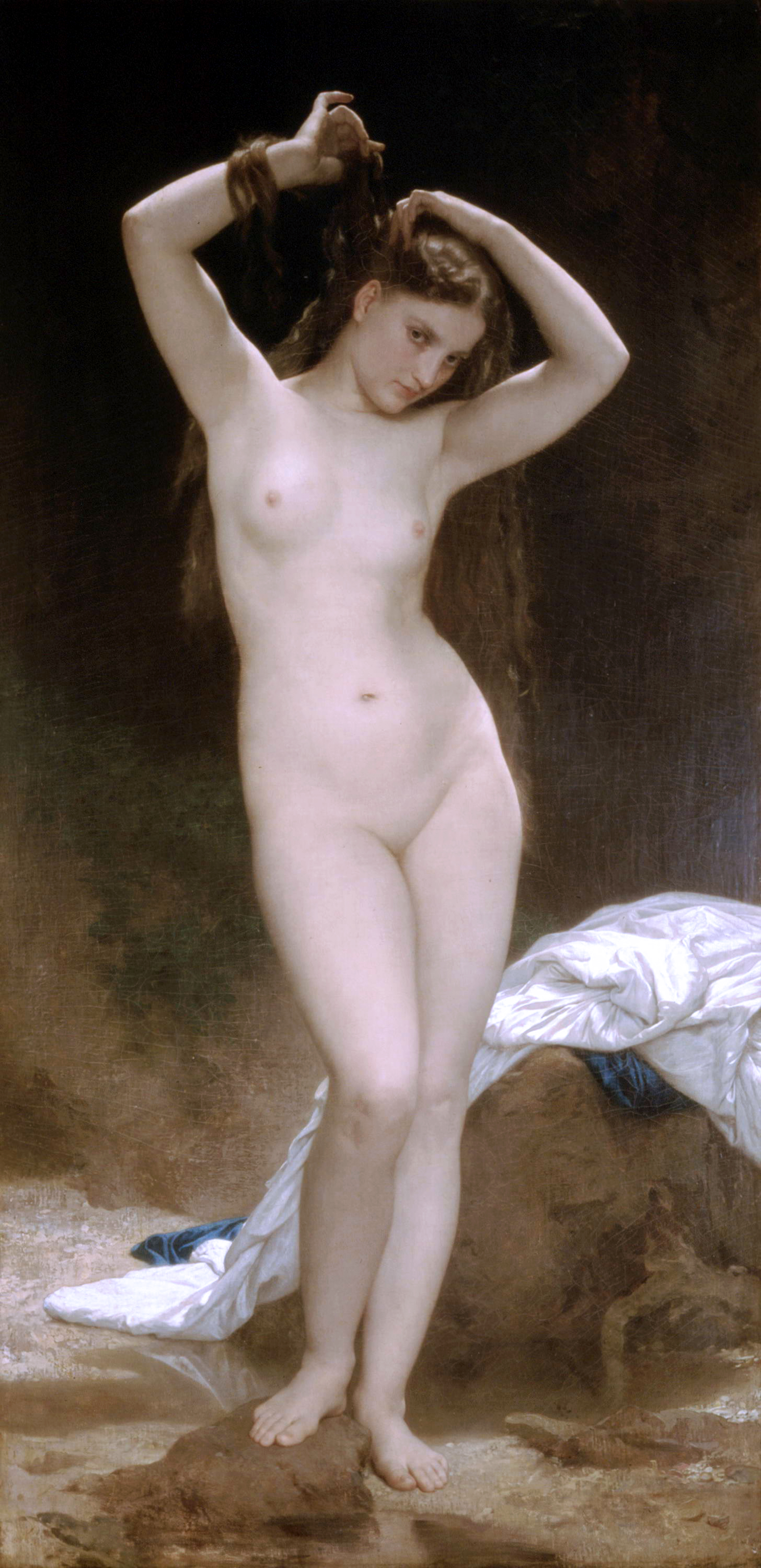
Baigneuse (1870)

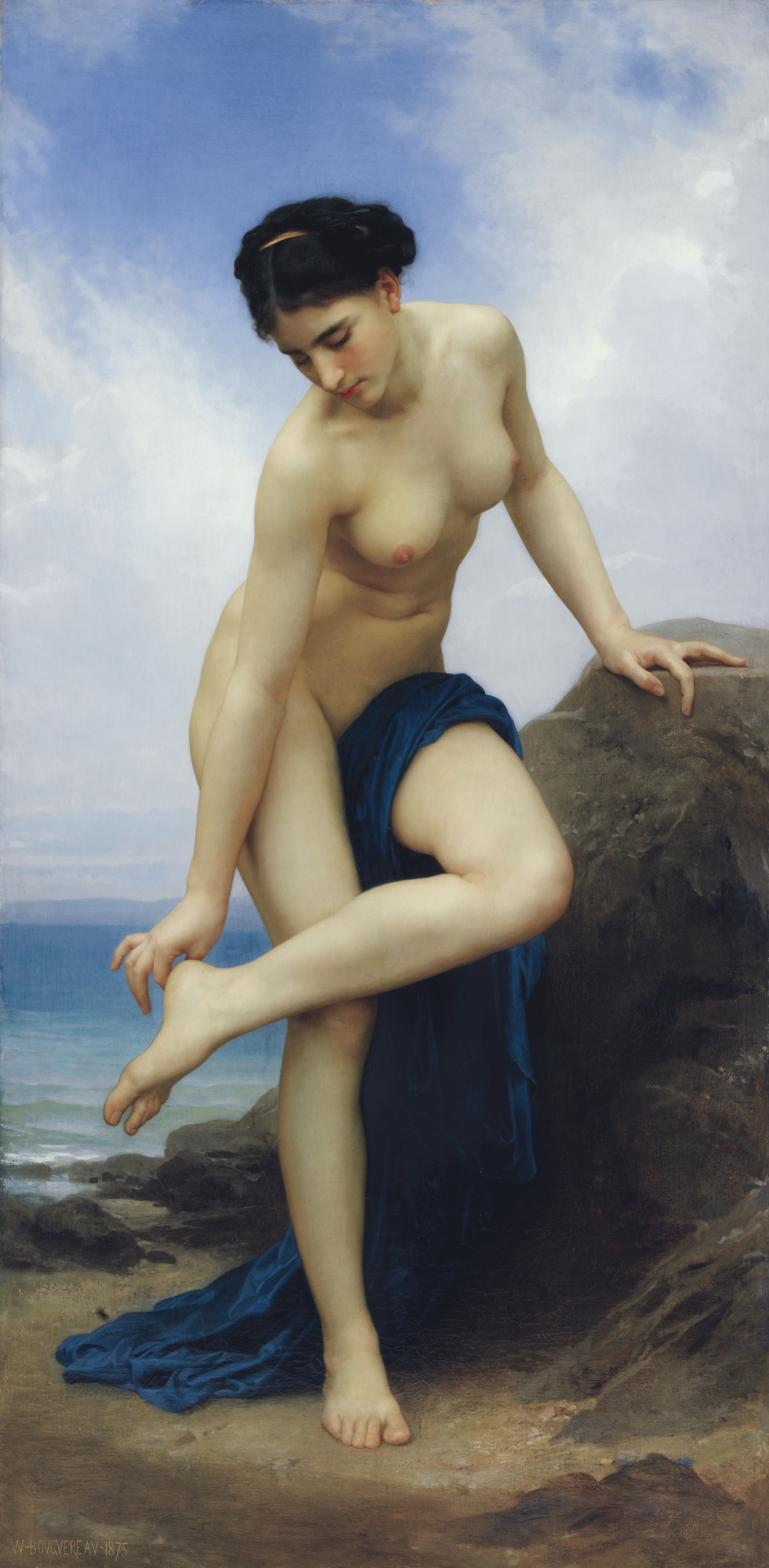
After the Bath (1875)

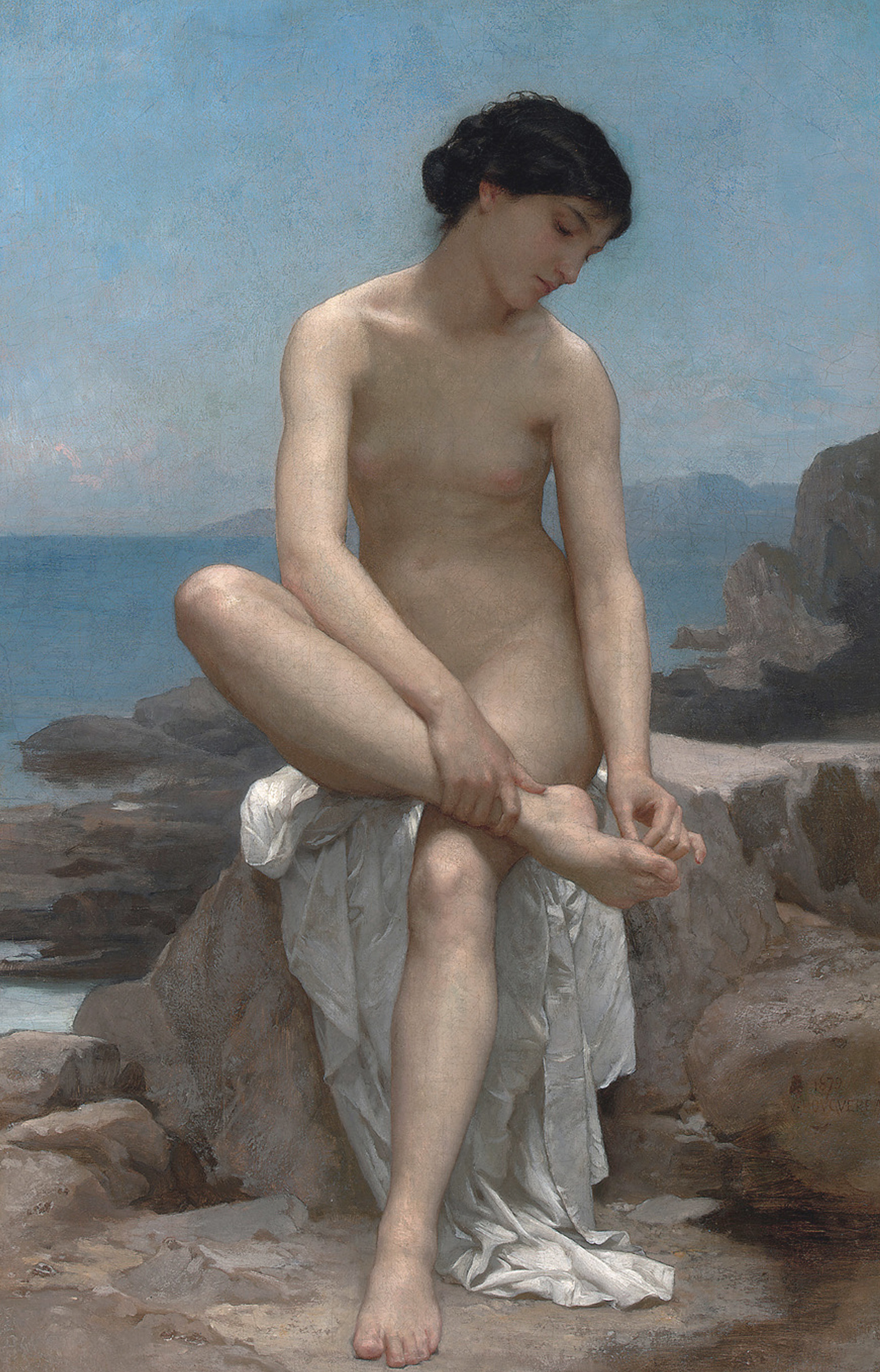
The Bather or Baigneuse (1879)

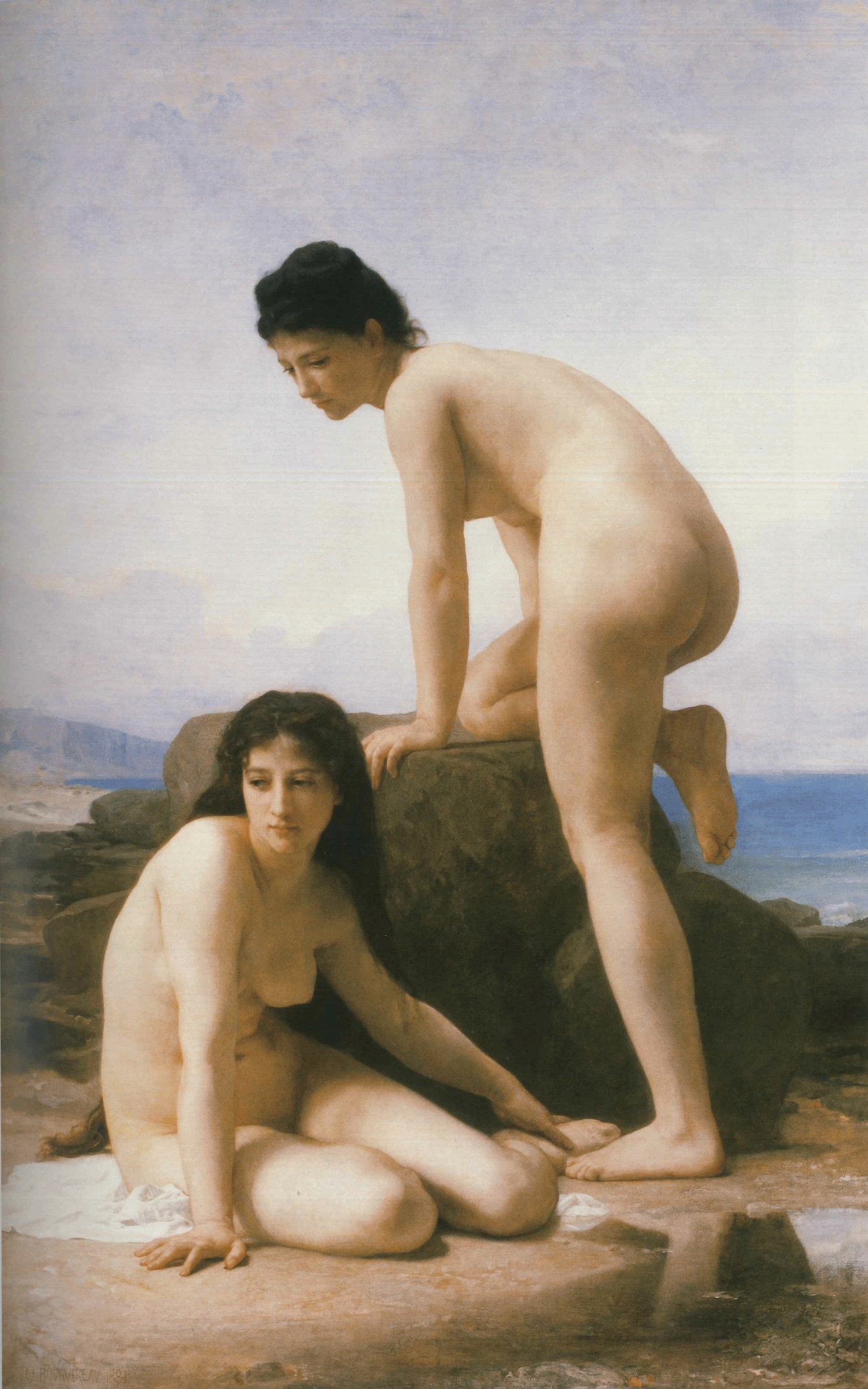
Les Deux Baigneuses (1884)

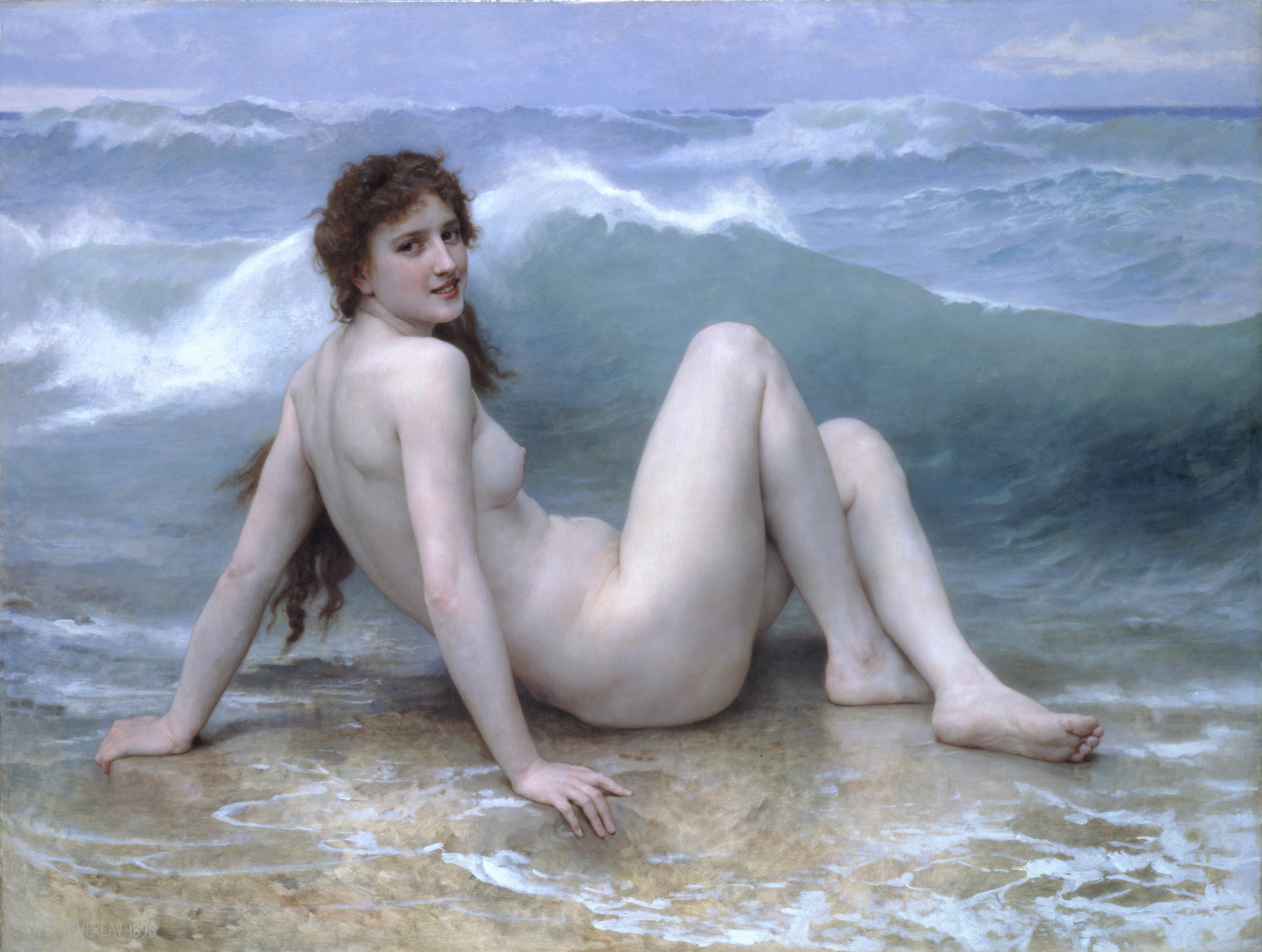
The Wave (1896)

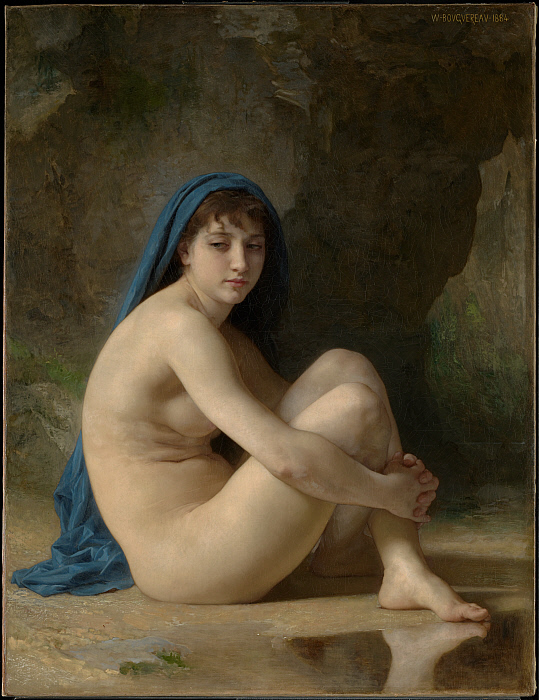
Seated nude (1884), oil on canvas, 18 1/8 x 14 5/8 in. (46 x 37.2 cm), Clark Art Institute
Depictions of mythological scenes

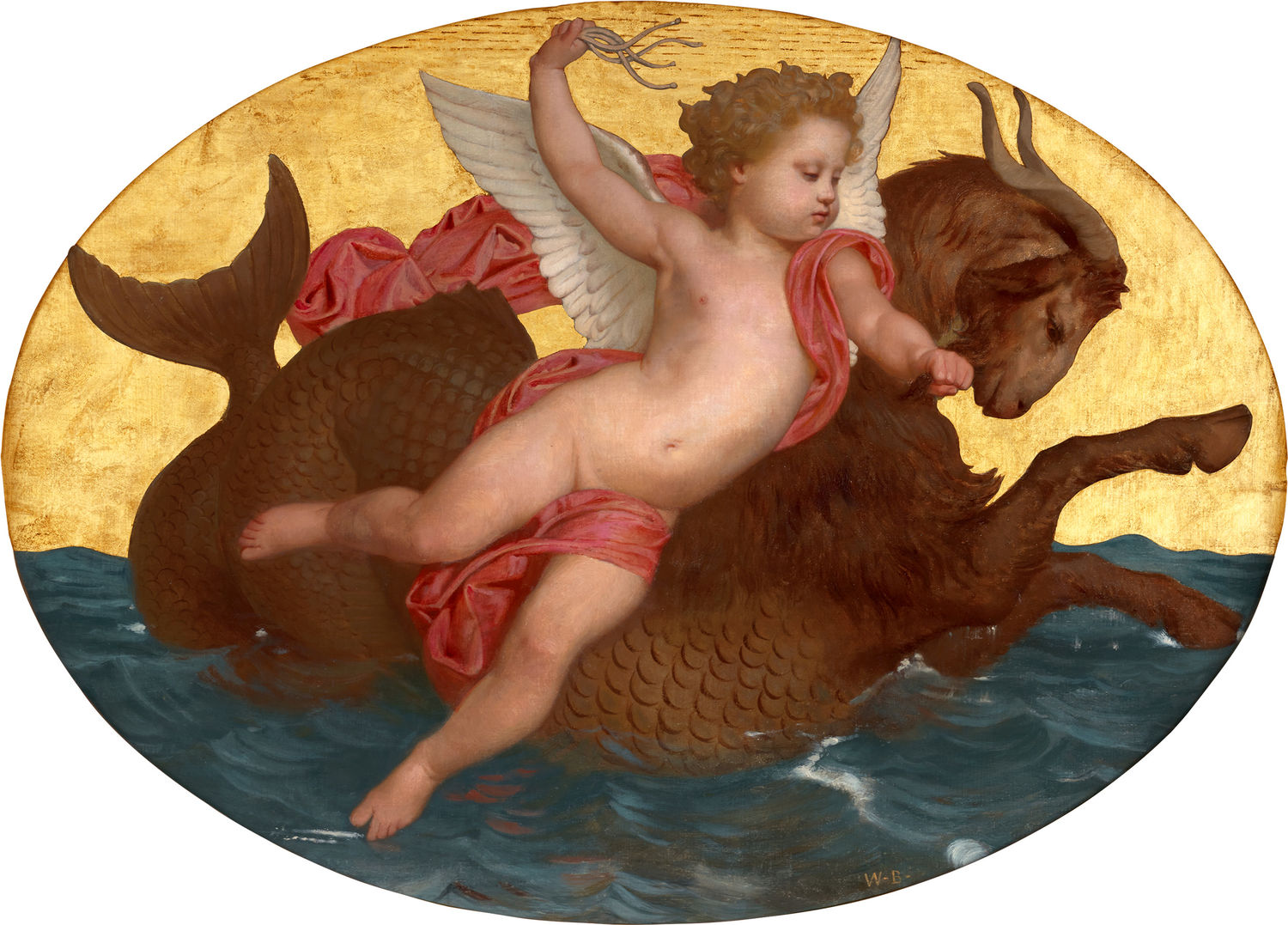
Enfant sur un monstre marin, 1857. Private collection.

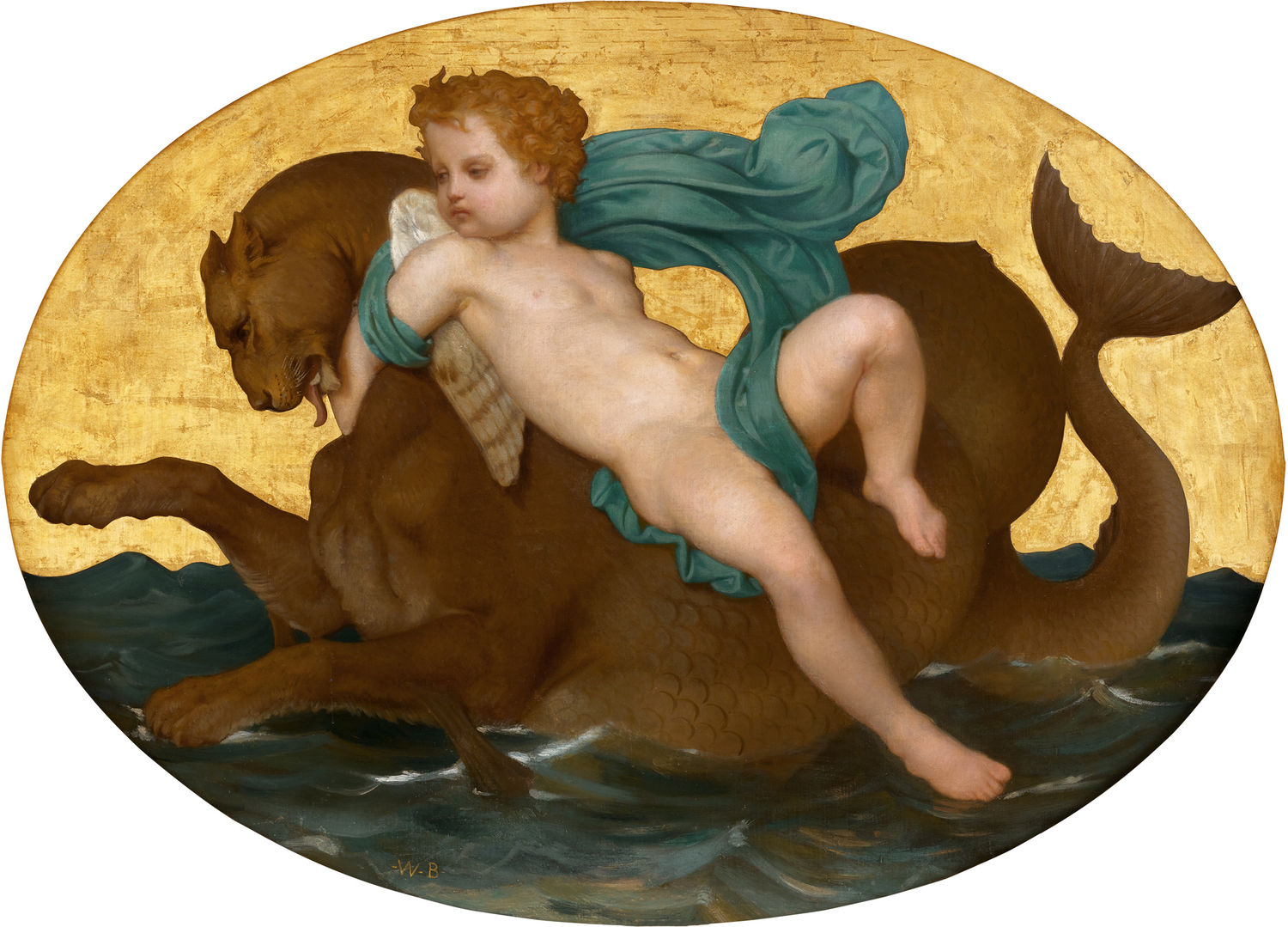
Enfant sur un griffon, 1857. Private collection.

== Reputation ==
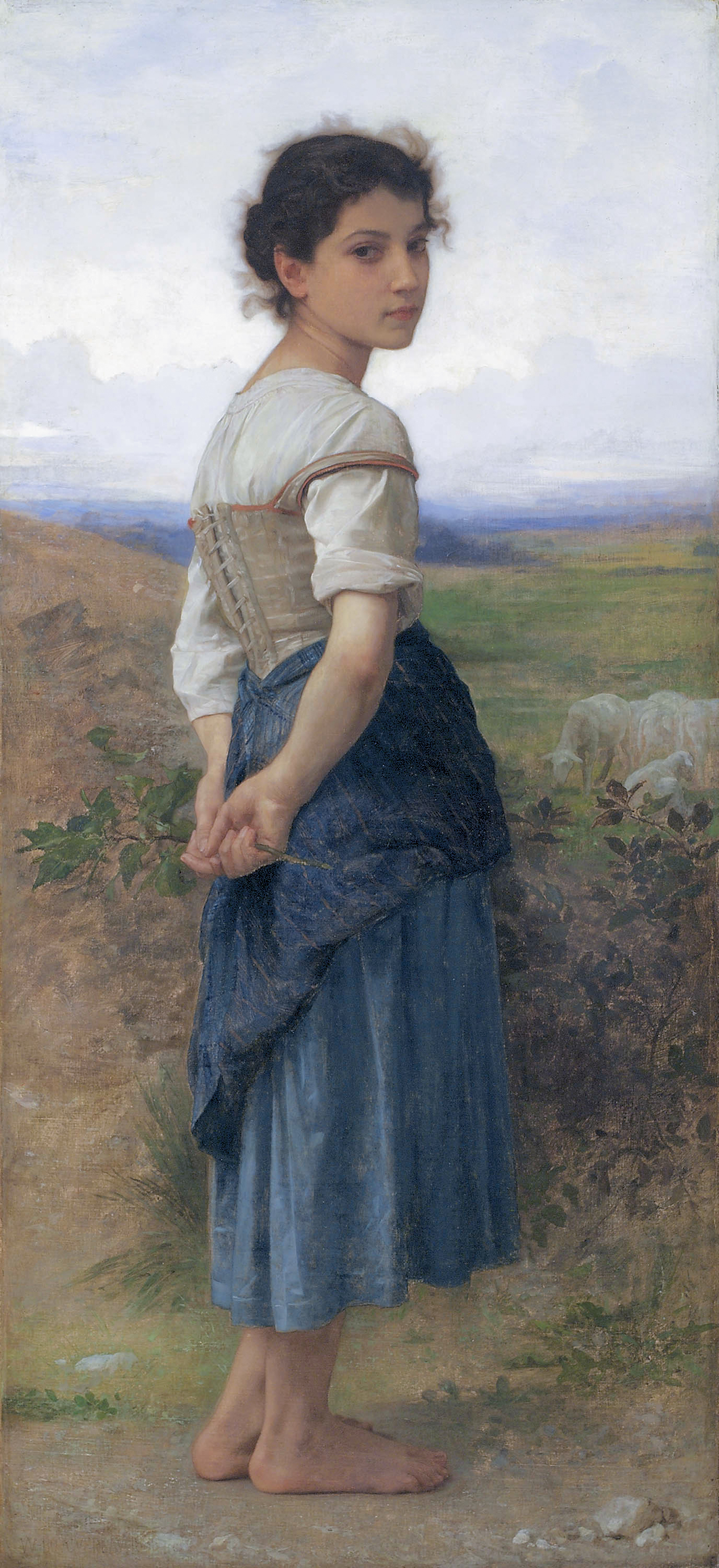
The Young Shepherdess (1885)

In his own time, Bouguereau was considered to be one of the greatest painters in the world by the academic art community, and simultaneously he was reviled by the avant-garde. He also gained wide fame in Belgium, the Netherlands, Portugal, Spain, Italy, Romania, and the United States, and commanded high prices. His works often sold within days of completion. Some were viewed by international collectors and bought before work had even finished.

Bouguereau's career was nearly a direct ascent with hardly a setback. To many, he epitomized taste and refinement, and a respect for tradition. To others, he was a competent technician stuck in the past. Degas and his associates used the term "Bouguereauté" in a derogatory manner to describe any artistic style reliant on "slick and artificial surfaces", also known as a licked finish. In an 1872 letter, Degas wrote that he strove to emulate Bouguereau's ordered and productive working style, although with Degas's famous trenchant wit, and the aesthetic tendencies of the Impressionists, it is possible the statement was meant to be ironic. Paul Gauguin loathed him, rating him a round zero in Racontars de Rapin and later describing in Avant et après (Intimate Journals) the single occasion when Bouguereau made him smile on coming across a couple of his paintings in an Arles brothel, "where they belonged".

Bouguereau's works were eagerly bought by American millionaires who considered him the most important French artist of that time. For example, Nymphs and Satyr was purchased first by John Wolfe, then sold by his heiress Catharine Lorillard Wolfe to hotelier Edward Stokes, who displayed it in New York City's Hoffman House Hotel. Two paintings by Bouguereau in the Nob Hill mansion of Leland Stanford were destroyed in the San Francisco earthquake and fire of 1906. Gold Rush tycoon James Ben Ali Haggin and his family, who normally eschewed the nude, made an exception for Bouguereau's Nymphaeum. In 1890 Bouguereau's painting Return of Spring was damaged at a Foreign art exhibition of local artists in Omaha, Nebraska. Carey J. Warbington, an accountant, threw a chair at the painting. After Warbington was convicted of insanity and eventually committed suicide. The picture after the incident still traveled the United States with the tear intact and the chair accompanied the painting also, wherever the painting was shown.

However, even during his lifetime, there was critical dissent in assessing his work; the art historian Richard Muther wrote in 1894 that Bouguereau was a man "destitute of artistic feeling but possessing a cultured taste [who] reveals... in his feeble mawkishness, the fatal decline of the old schools of convention". In 1926, American art historian Frank Jewett Mather criticized the commercial intent of Bouguereau's work, writing that the artist "multiplied vague, pink effigies of nymphs, occasionally draped them, when they became saints and madonnas, painted on the great scale that dominates an exhibition, and has had his reward. I am convinced that the nude of Bouguereau was prearranged to meet the ideals of a New York stockbroker of the black walnut generation." Bouguereau confessed in 1891 that the direction of his mature work was largely a response to the marketplace: "What do you expect, you have to follow public taste, and the public only buys what it likes. That's why, with time, I changed my way of painting."

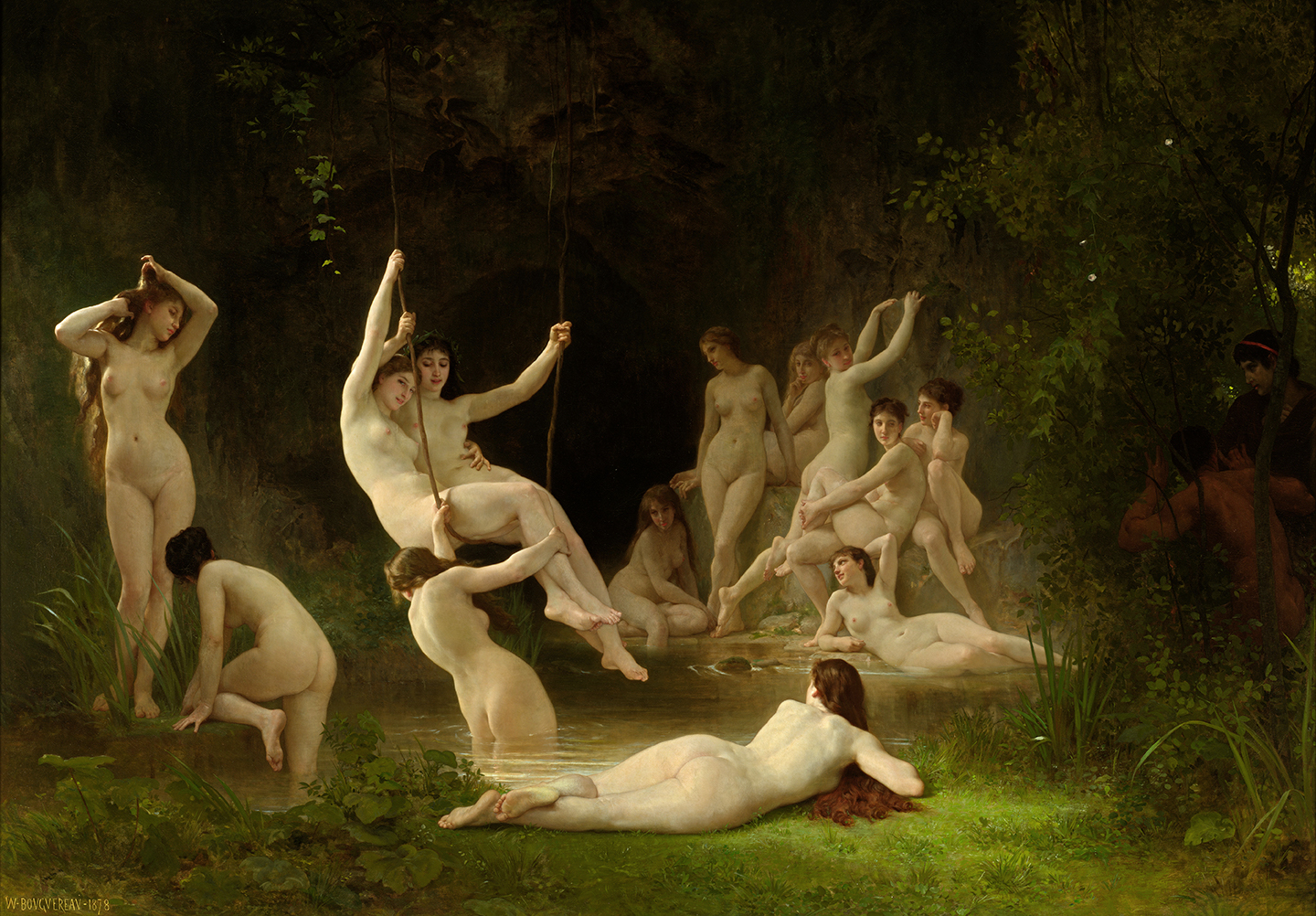
Nymphaeum, 1878, Haggin Museum

Bouguereau fell into disrepute after 1920, due in part to changing tastes. Comparing his work to that of his Realist and Impressionist contemporaries, Kenneth Clark faulted Bouguereau's painting for "lubricity", and characterized such Salon art as superficial, employing the "convention of smoothed-out form and waxen surface".

The New York Cultural Center staged a show of Bouguereau's work in 1974—partly as a curiosity, although curator Robert Isaacson had his eye on the long-term rehabilitation of Bouguereau's legacy and reputation. In 1984, the Borghi Gallery hosted a commercial show of 23 oil paintings and one drawing. In the same year, a major exhibition was organized by the Montreal Museum of Fine Arts in Canada. The exhibition opened at the Musée du Petit-Palais, in Paris, traveled to The Wadsworth Atheneum in Hartford, and concluded in Montreal. More recently, resurgence in the artist's popularity has been promoted by American collector Fred Ross, who owns a number of paintings by Bouguereau and features him on his website at Art Renewal Center.

In 2019, the Milwaukee Art Museum exhibited more than 40 of Bouguereau's paintings in a major retrospective of his work, which according to The Wall Street Journal, asked the readers to "see Bouguereau through the eyes of an age when he was lionized, and Impressionism was dismissed as 'French freedom'". The exhibition later travel to the Memphis Brooks Museum of Art in Memphis, Tennessee, and then to the San Diego Museum of Art. The exhibition was co-organized by the Memphis Brooks Museum of Art and the Milwaukee Art Museum.

Prices for Bouguereau's works have climbed steadily since 1975, with major paintings selling at high prices: $1.5 million in 1998 for The Heart's Awakening, $2.6 million in 1999 for The Motherland and Charity at auction in May 2000 for $3.5 million. Bouguereau's works are in many public collections.

Notre Dame des Anges ("Our Lady of the Angels") was last shown publicly in the United States at the World's Columbian Exhibition in Chicago in 1893. It was donated in 2002 to the Daughters of Mary Mother of Our Savior, an order of nuns affiliated with Clarence Kelly's Traditionalist Catholic Society of St. Pius V. In 2009, the nuns sold it for $450,000 to an art dealer, who was able to sell it for more than $2 million. Kelly was subsequently found guilty by a jury in Albany, New York, of defaming the dealer in remarks made in a television interview.

== Name ==
Bouguereau's signature

Sources on his full name are contradictory: it is sometimes given as William-Adolphe Bouguereau (composed name), William Adolphe Bouguereau (usual and civil-only names according to the French tradition), while in other occasions it appears as Adolphe William Bouguereau (with Adolphe as the usual name). However, he used to sign his works simply as William Bouguereau (hinting "William" was his given name, whatever the order), or more precisely as "W.Bouguereau.date" (French alphabet) and later as "W-BOVGVEREAV-date" (Latin alphabet).

== Awards and honours ==
- 1848: Second Prix de Rome, for Saint Pierre après sa délivrance de prison, vient retrouver les fidèles chez Marie.
- 1850: Premier Prix de Rome, for Zenobie retrouvée par les bergers sur les bords de l'Araxe.
- 1859: Knight of the Legion of Honour
- 1876: Officer of the Legion of Honour
- 1881: Knight in the Order of Leopold
- 1885: Commander of the Legion of Honour
- 1885: Grand Medal of Honour
- 1890: Member of the Royal Academy of Science, Letters and Fine Arts of Belgium
- 1905: Grand Officier of the Legion of Honour

== In literature ==
In The King in Yellow, by Robert W. Chambers, he is mentioned in various tales as a teacher at the École des Beaux-Arts.

In Sir Arthur Conan Doyle's novel The Sign of the Four (1890), the character Mr Sholto remarks, "there cannot be the least question about the Bouguereau. I am partial to the modern French school."

In the Pulitzer Prize winning novel The Age of Innocence, Edith Wharton parenthetically described the audacity of a nouveau riche family to hang a "much-discussed nude of Bouguereau" in their Fifth Avenue mansion where ladies walking to a ballroom might see it.

== Selected works ==
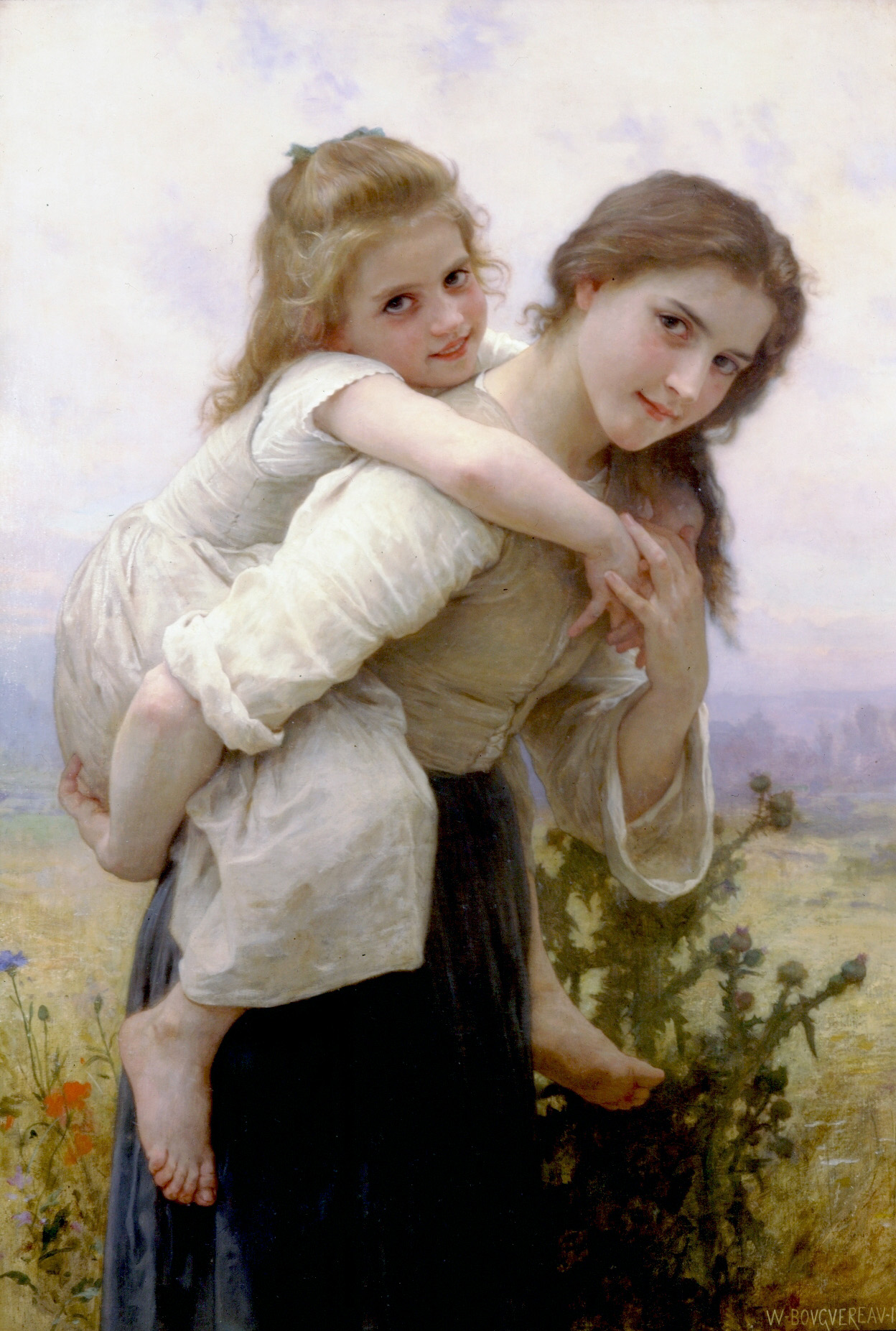
Pleasant Burden (1895)

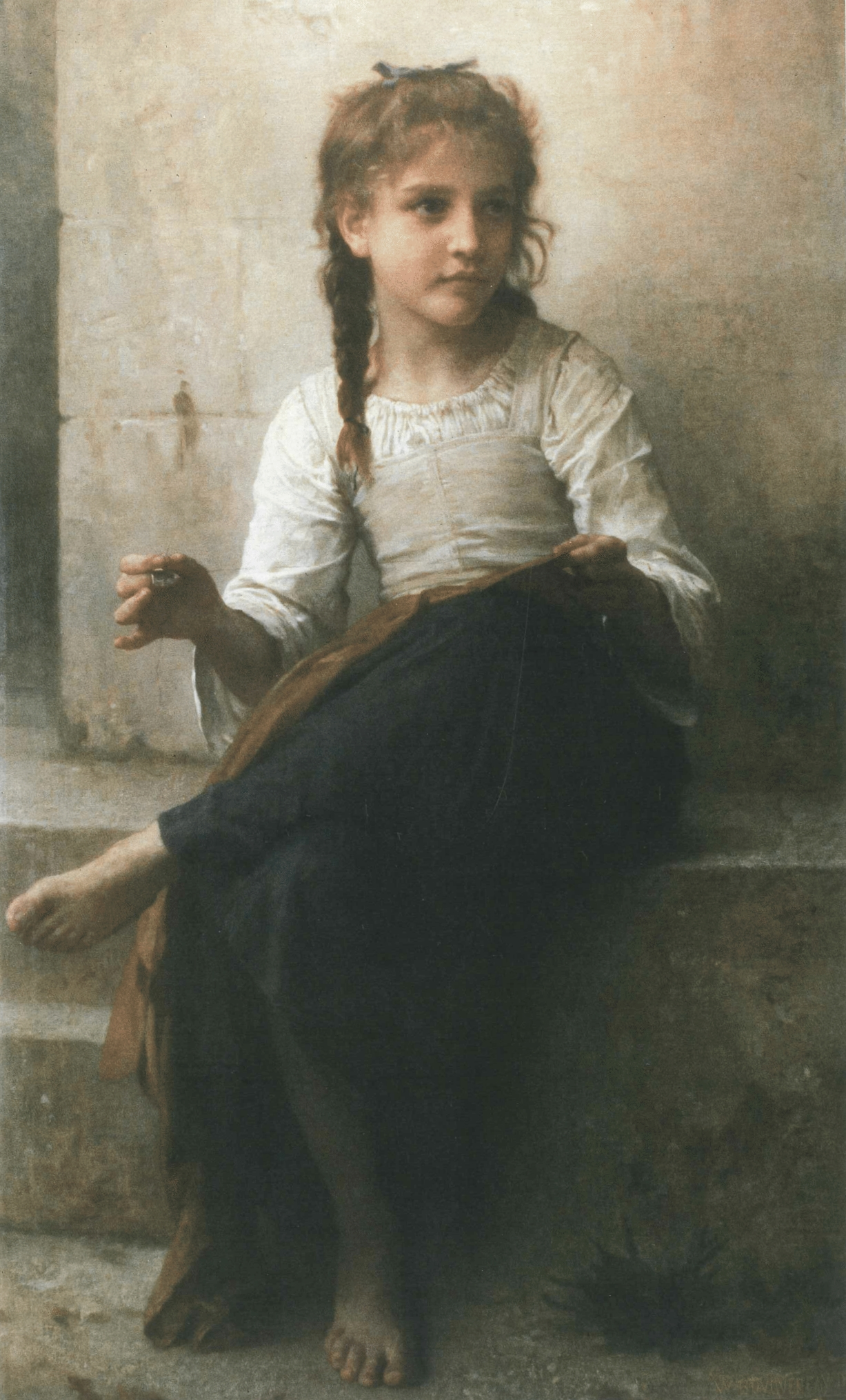
Sewing (1898)

- La Danse (1856)
- Bather (1864)
- Le Sommeil (1864)
- Loin du Pays (painting and two reductions) Far From Home (1867)
- Alone in the World (Latest 1867)
- The Knitting Girl (1869)
- The Elder Sister (1869)
- Italian Girl at the Fountain (1870)
- Baigneuse (1870)
- Nymphs and Satyr (1873)
- Homer and his Guide (1874)
- At the Edge of the River (1875)
- Flora and Zephyr (1875)
- The Grape Picker (1875)
- The Little Knitter (1875)
- Pietà (1876)
- La Jeunesse et l'Amour (1877)
- The Donkey Ride (1878)
- The Birth of Venus (1879)
- Girl Defending herself against Cupid (1880)
- Song of the Angels (1881)
- Le Crépuscule (1882)
- The Nut Gatherers (1882)
- Alma Parens of Mother France (1883)
- The Youth of Bacchus (1884)
- Byblis (1884)
- The Return of Spring (1886)
- Woman with Captive Cupid (1886)
- The First Mourning (1888)
- The Shepherdess (1889)
- Les murmures de l'Amour (1889)
- Gabrielle Cot, a portrait of Cot's daughter, 1890
- L'Amour et Psyché, enfants (1890)
- The Bohemian (1890)
- Little Beggars (1890)
- Le Travail interrompu (1891)
- The Goose Girl (1891)
- The Wasps Nest (1892)
- Innocence (1893)
- Pleasant Burden (1895)
- The Ravishment of Psyche (1895)
- The Wave (1896)
- Admiration (1897)
- La Vierge au lys (1899)
- Rêve de printemps (1901)
- Yvonne on the Doorstep (1901)
- The Oreads (1902)
- Oceanid (1904)
- In The Woods (1905)

== Gallery ==
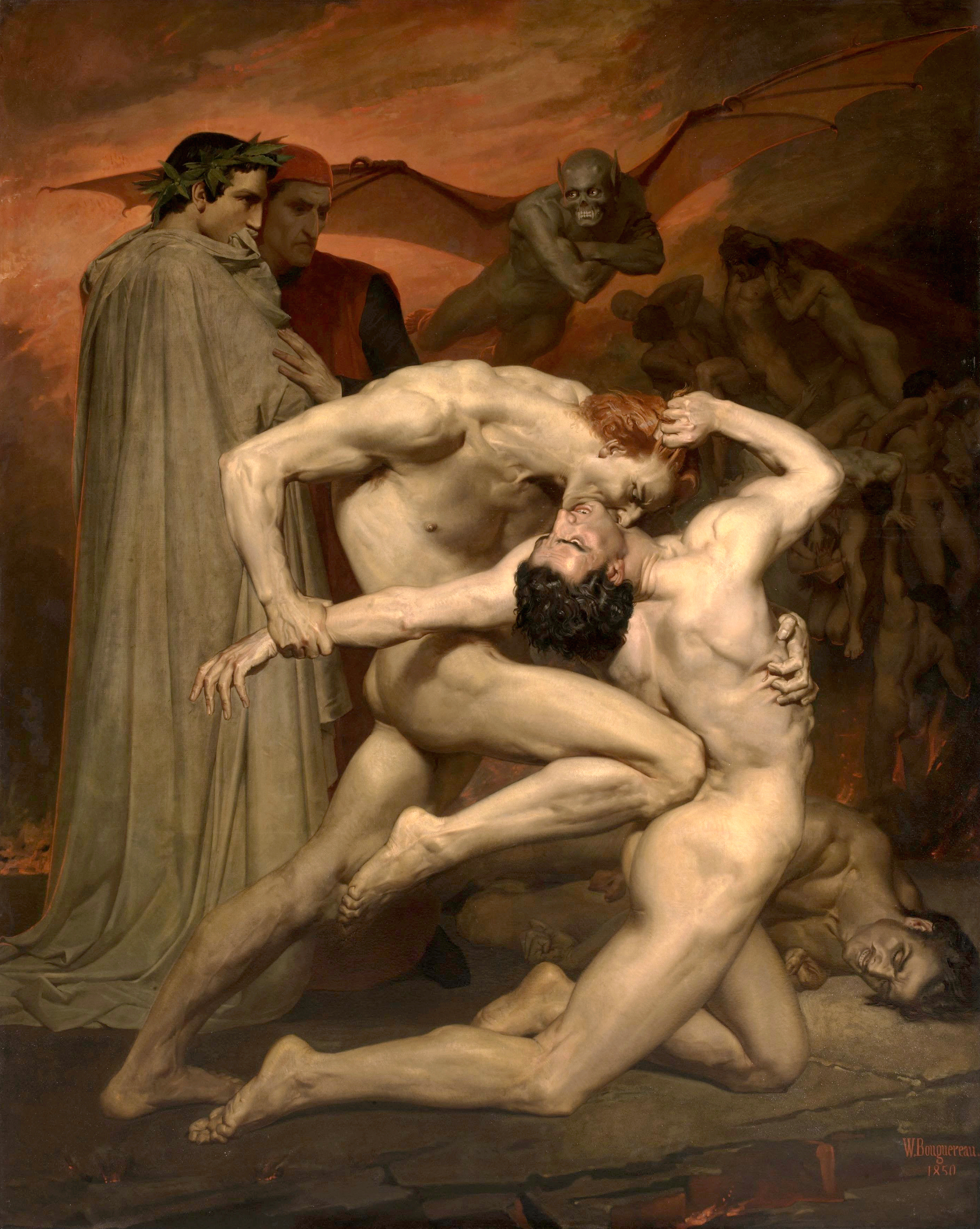
Dante and Virgil in Hell (1850)

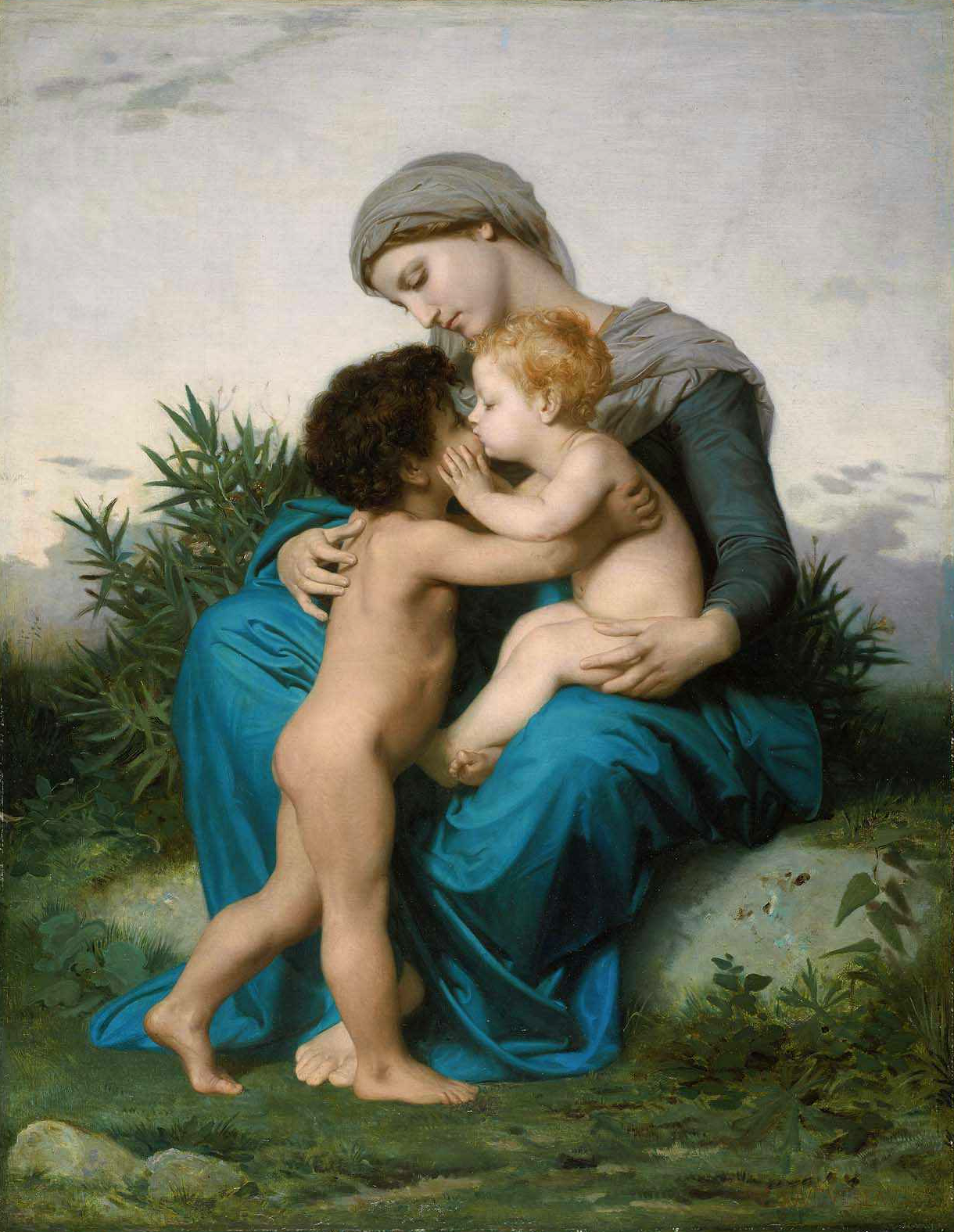
Fraternal Love (1851)

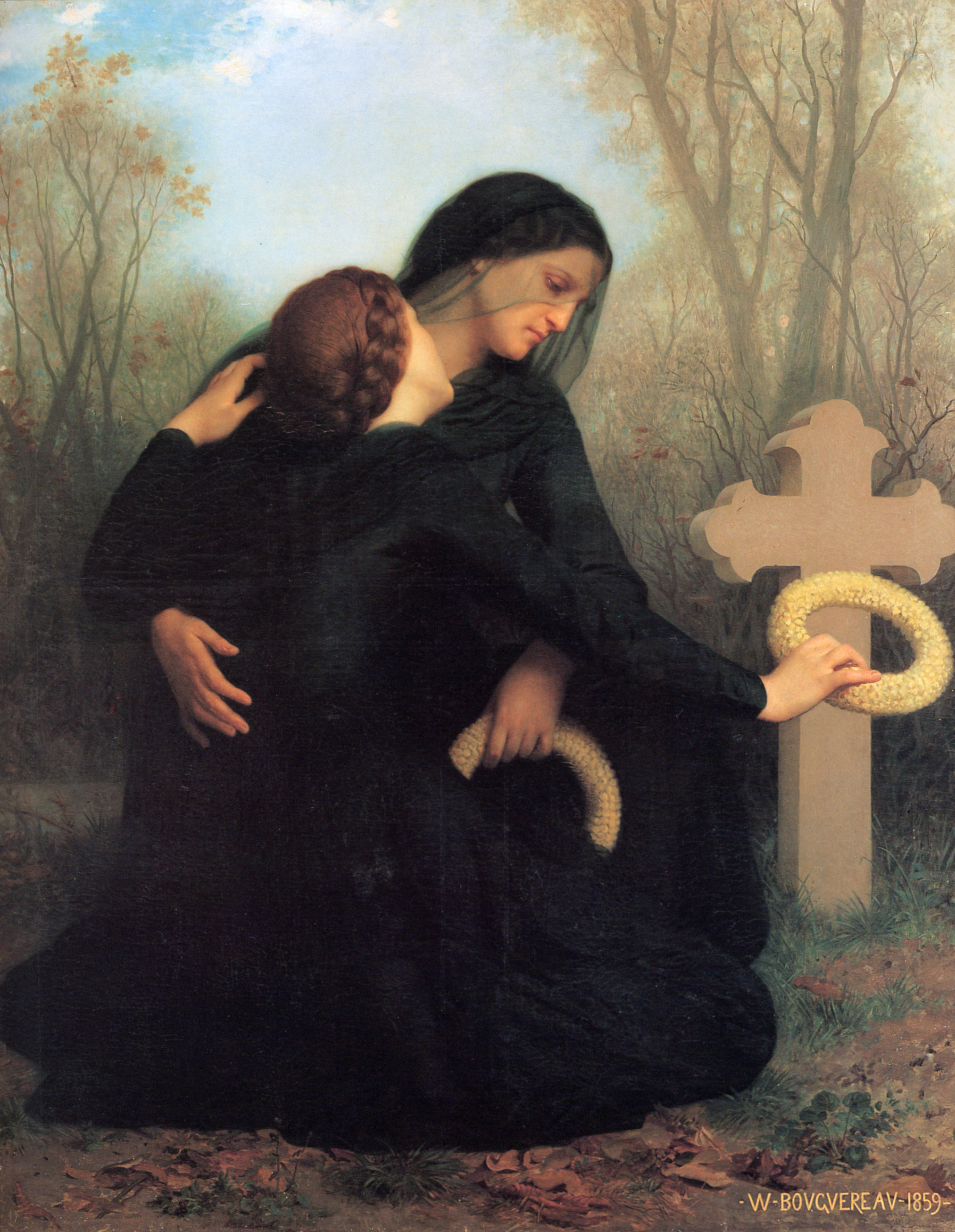
The Day of the Dead (1859)

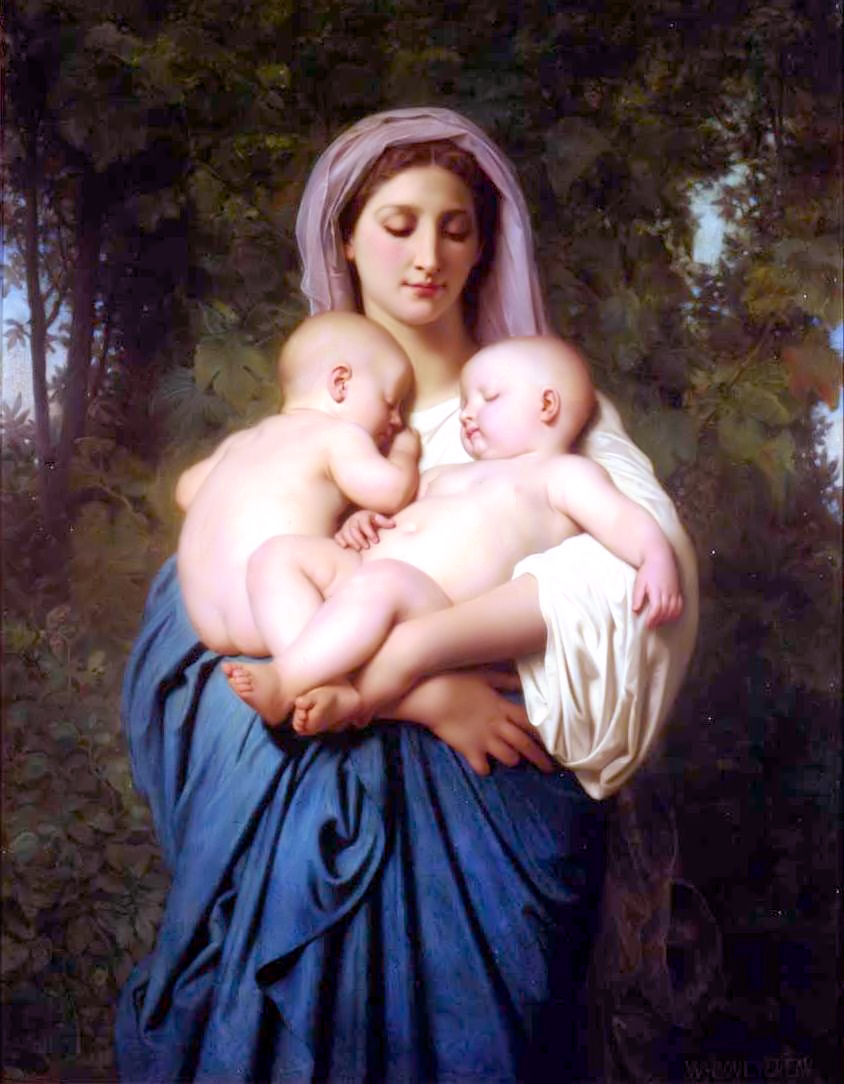
Charity (1859)

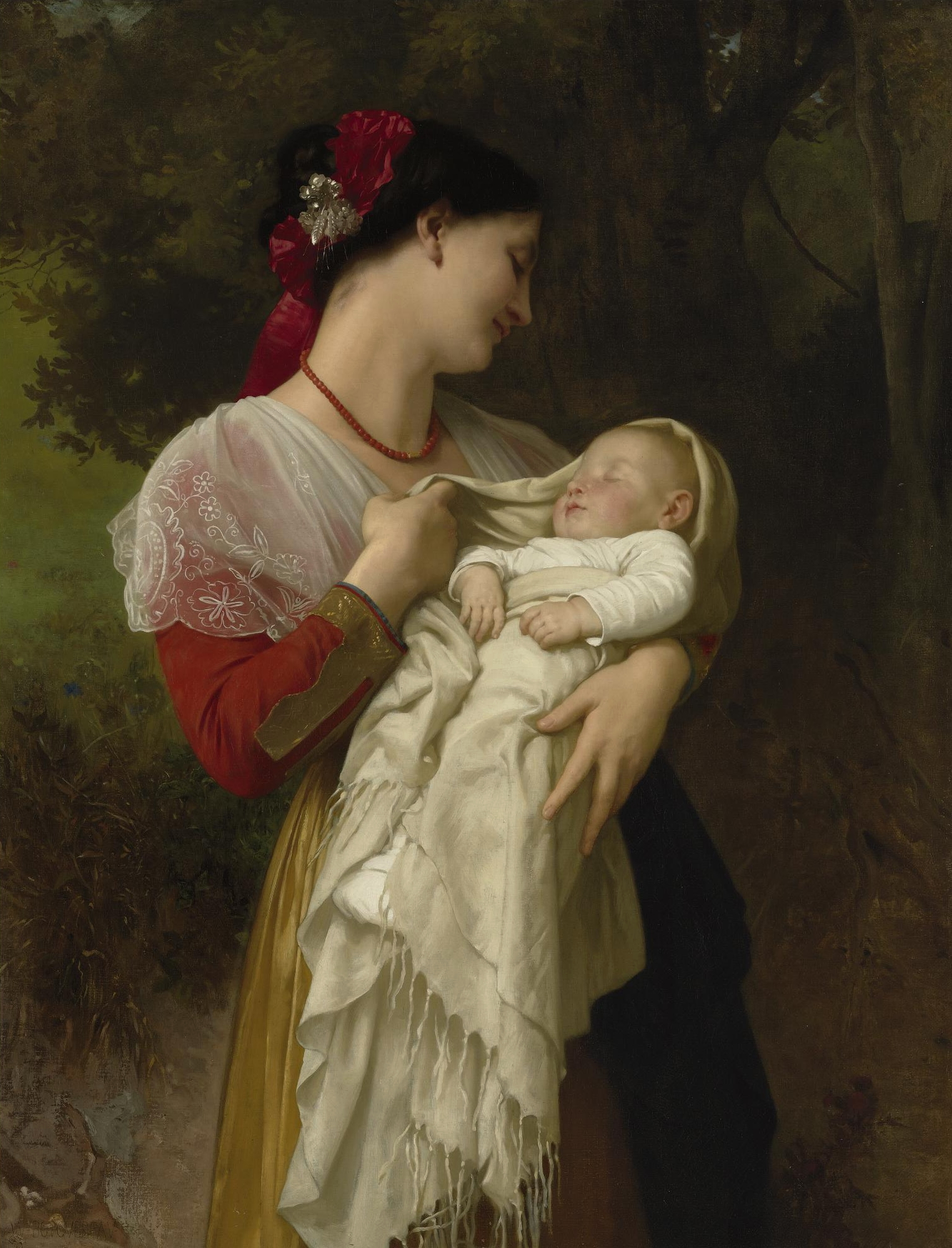
Maternal Admiration (1869)

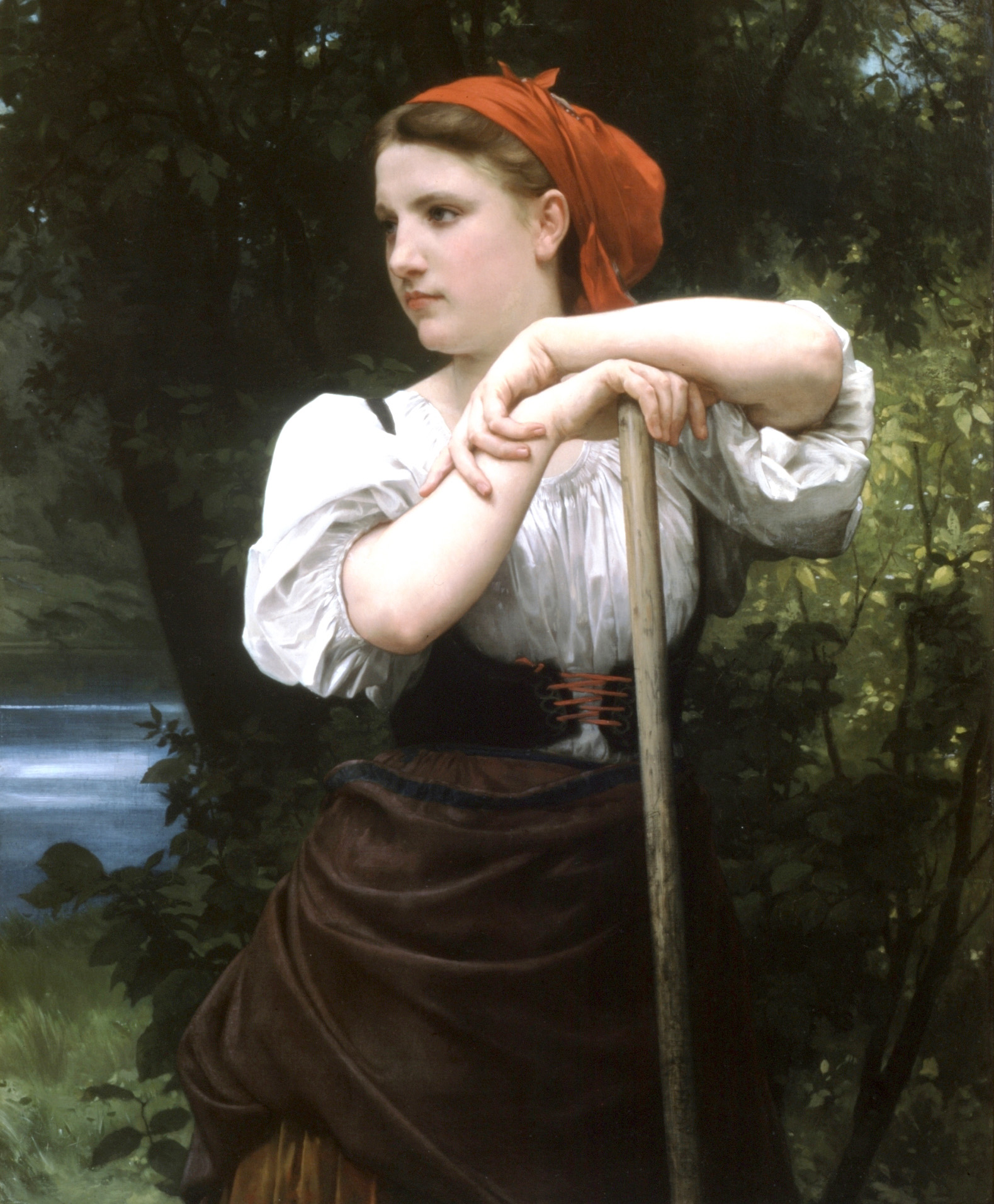
The Haymaker (1869)

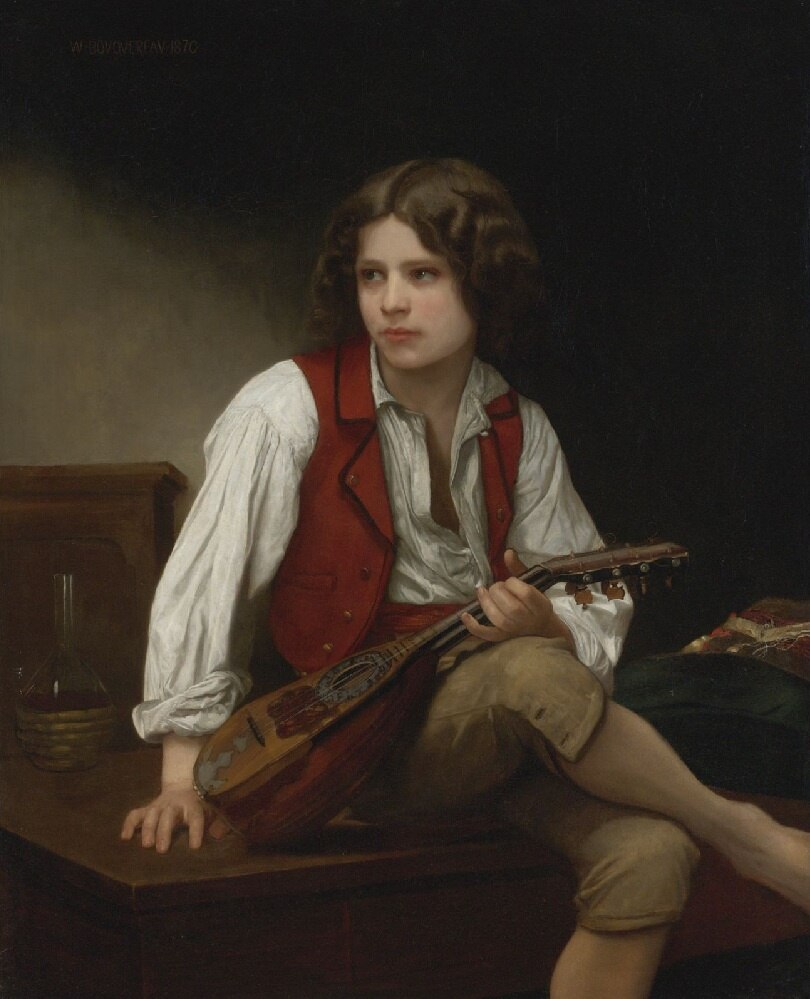
Italian Mandolin (1870)

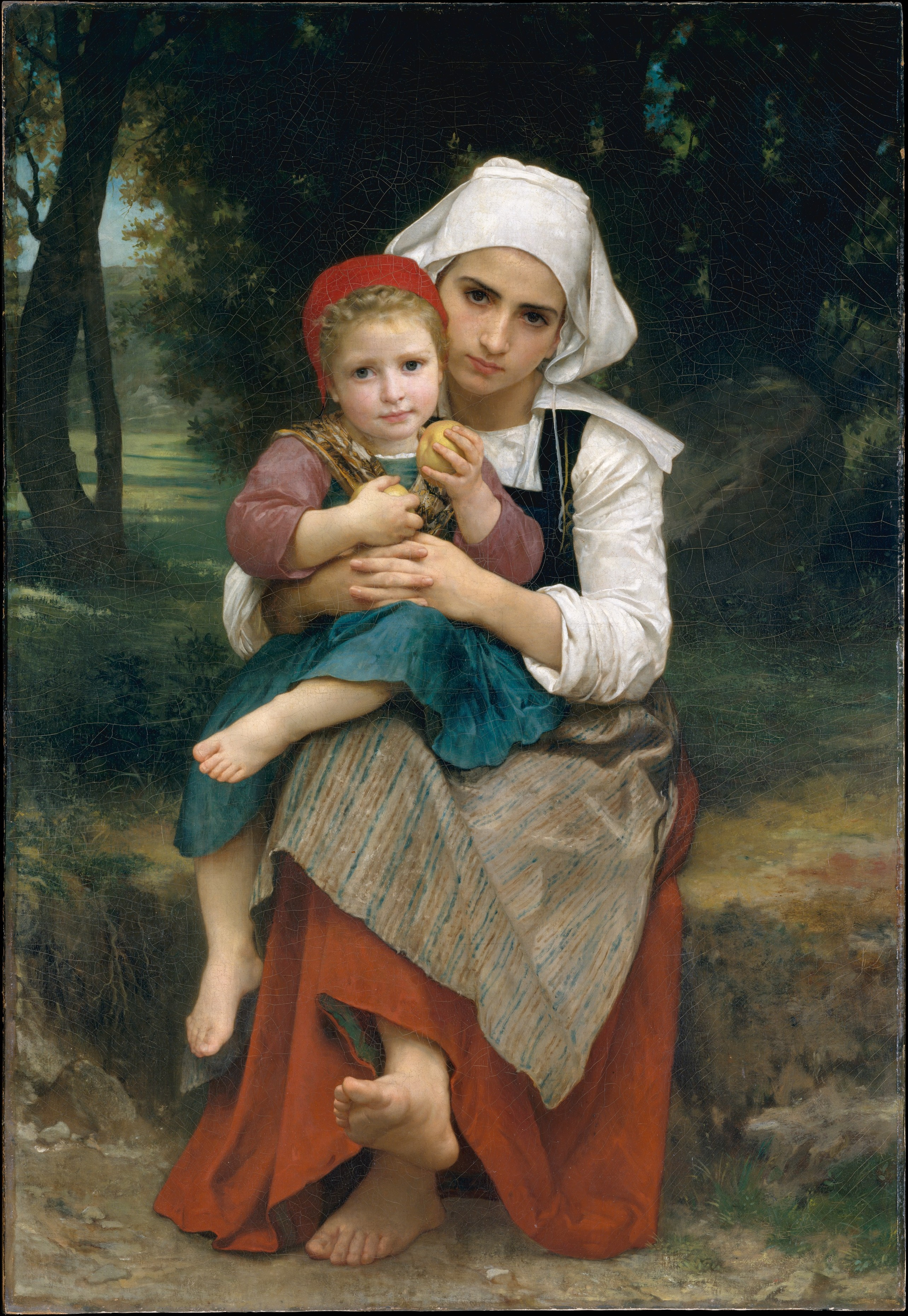
Breton Brother and Sister (1871)

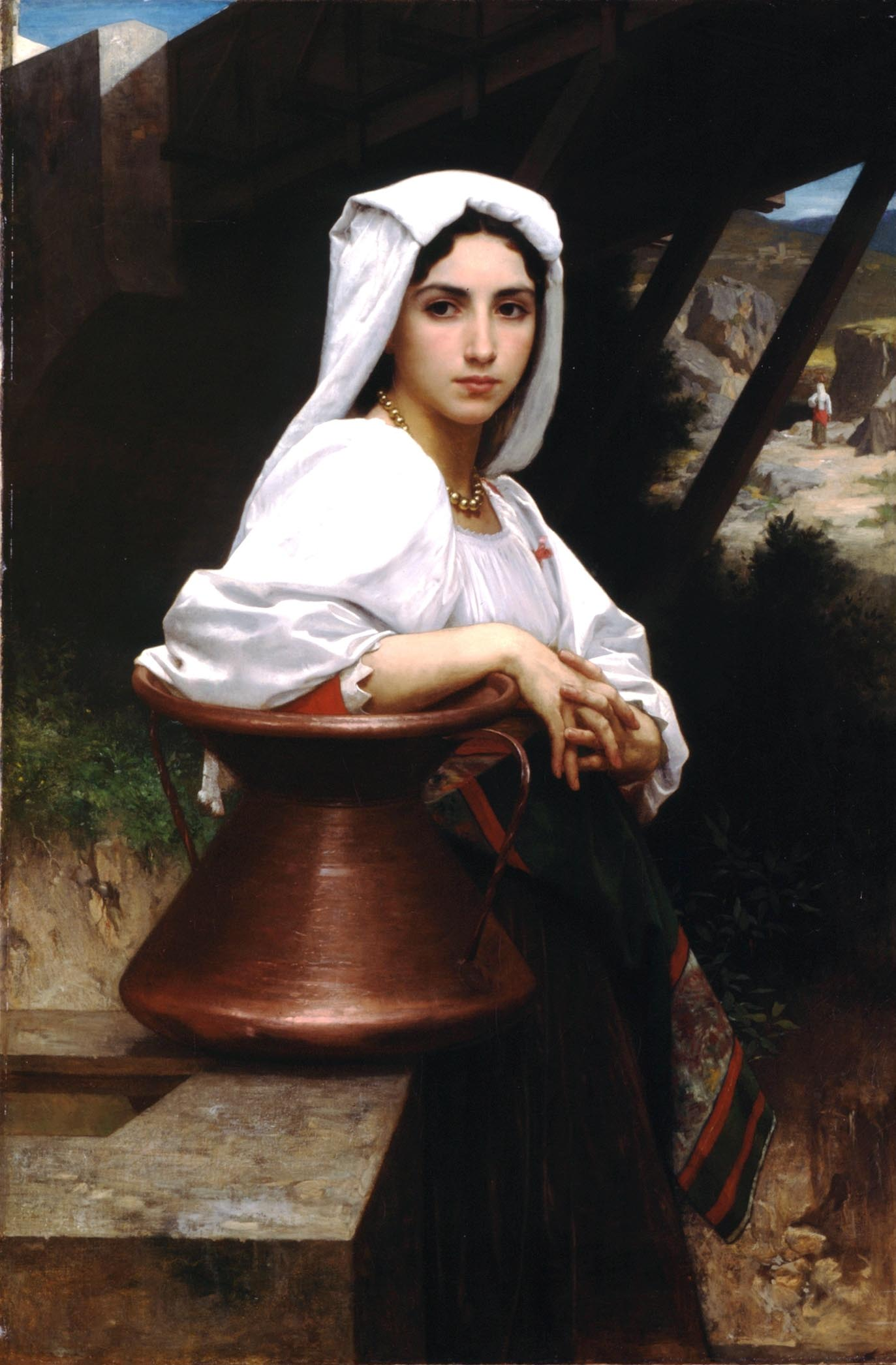
Italian Girl Drawing Water (1871)

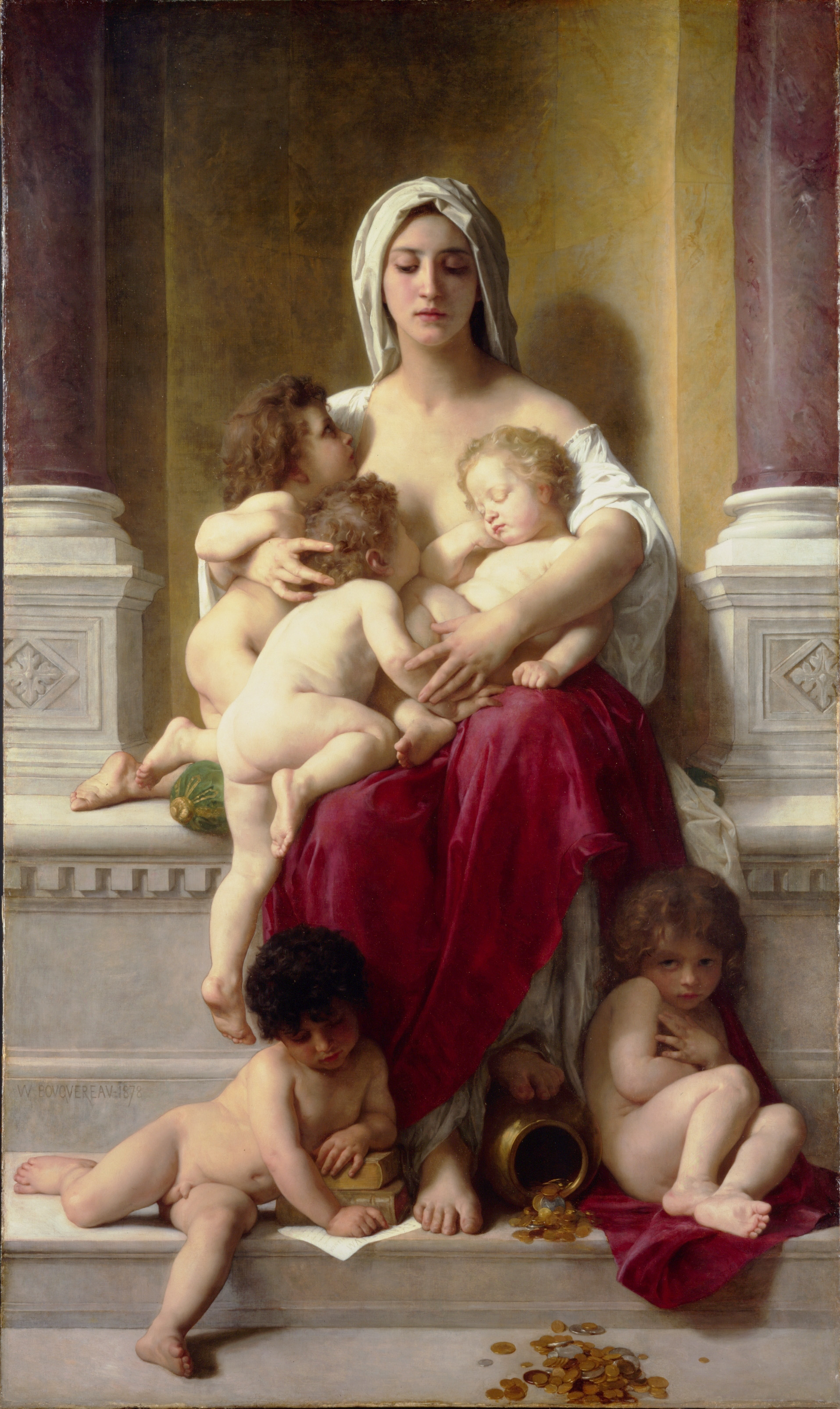
Charity (1878)

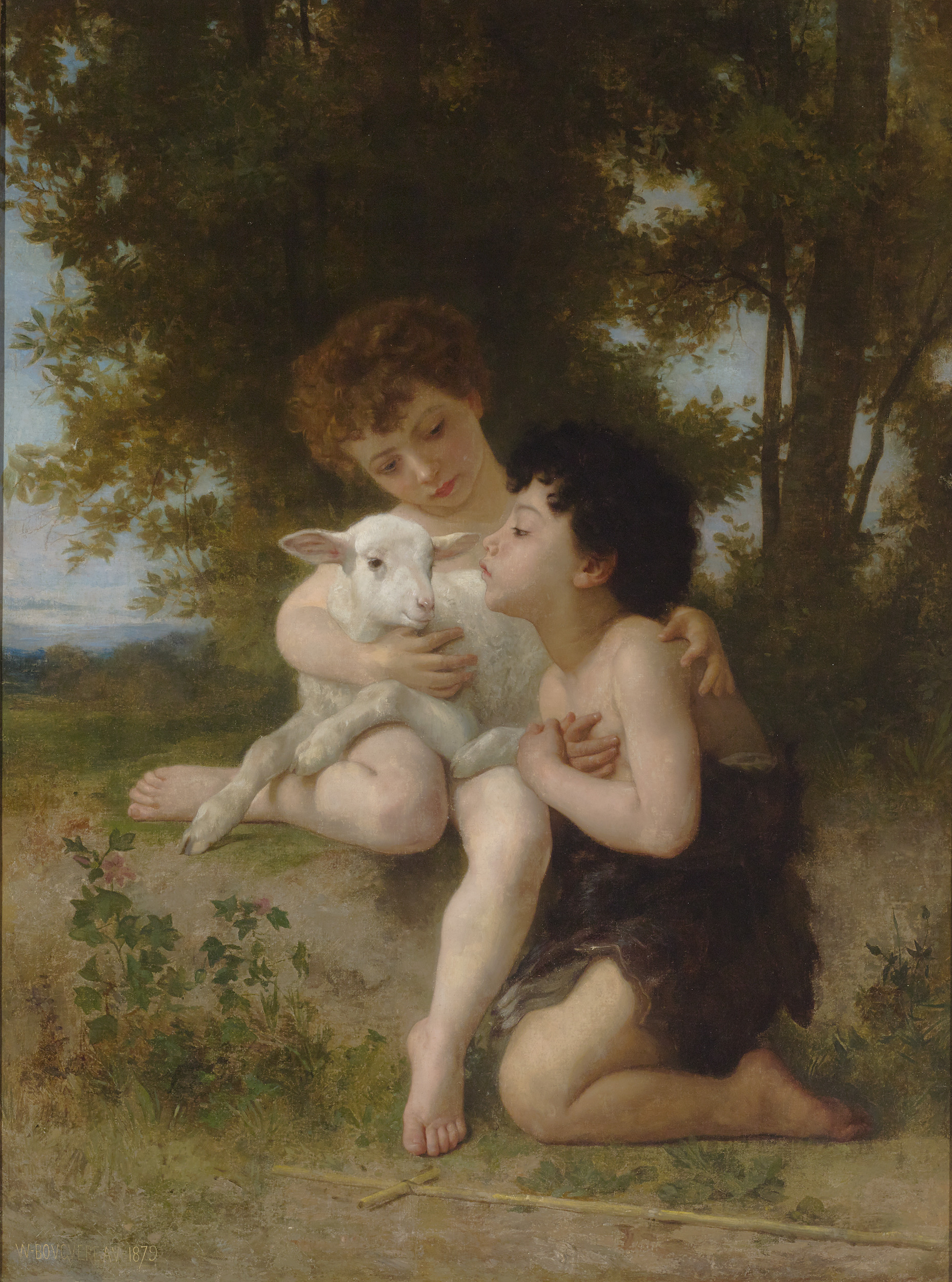
Les Enfants à L'Agneau (1879)

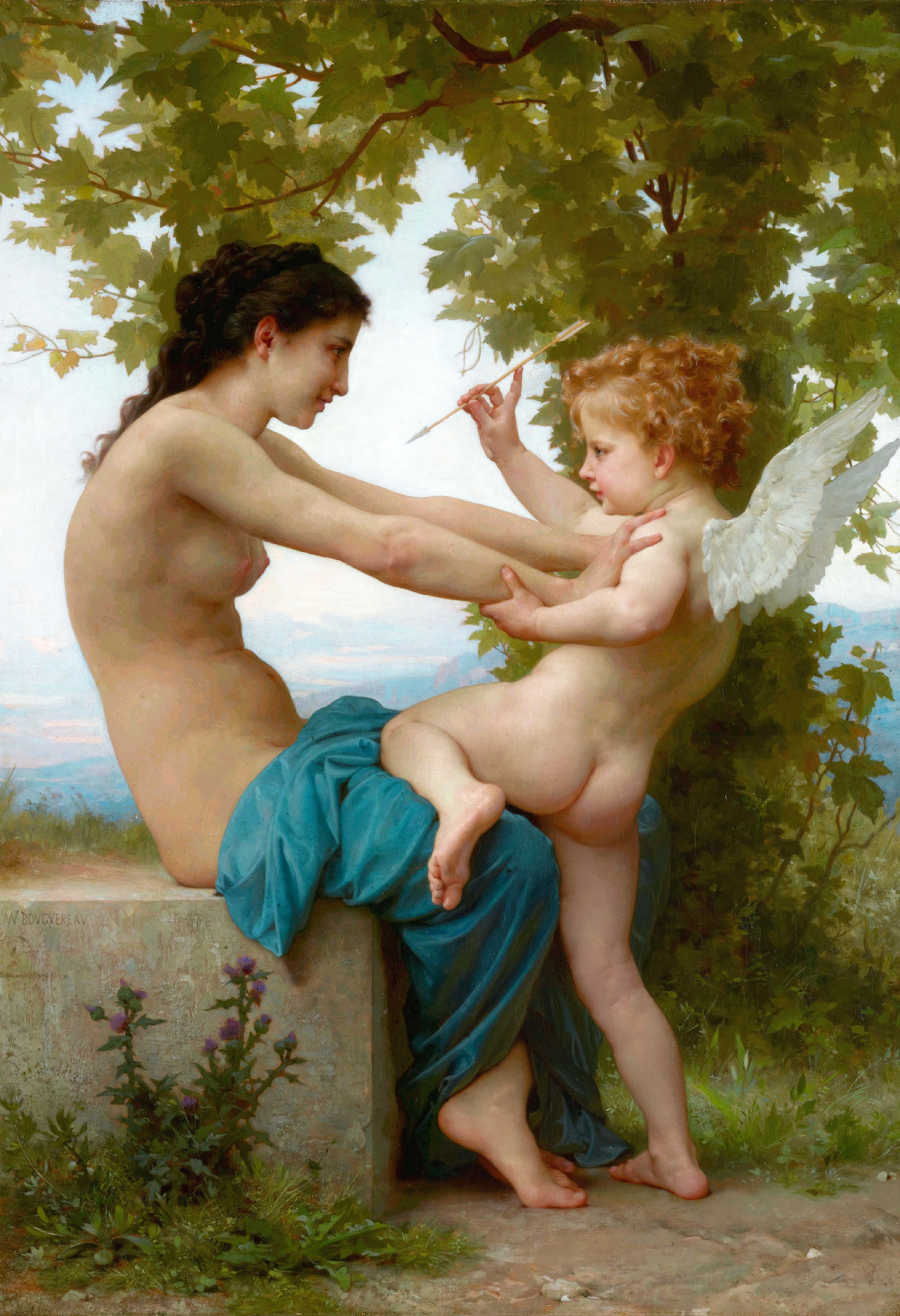
A Young Girl Defending Herself Against Eros (1880)

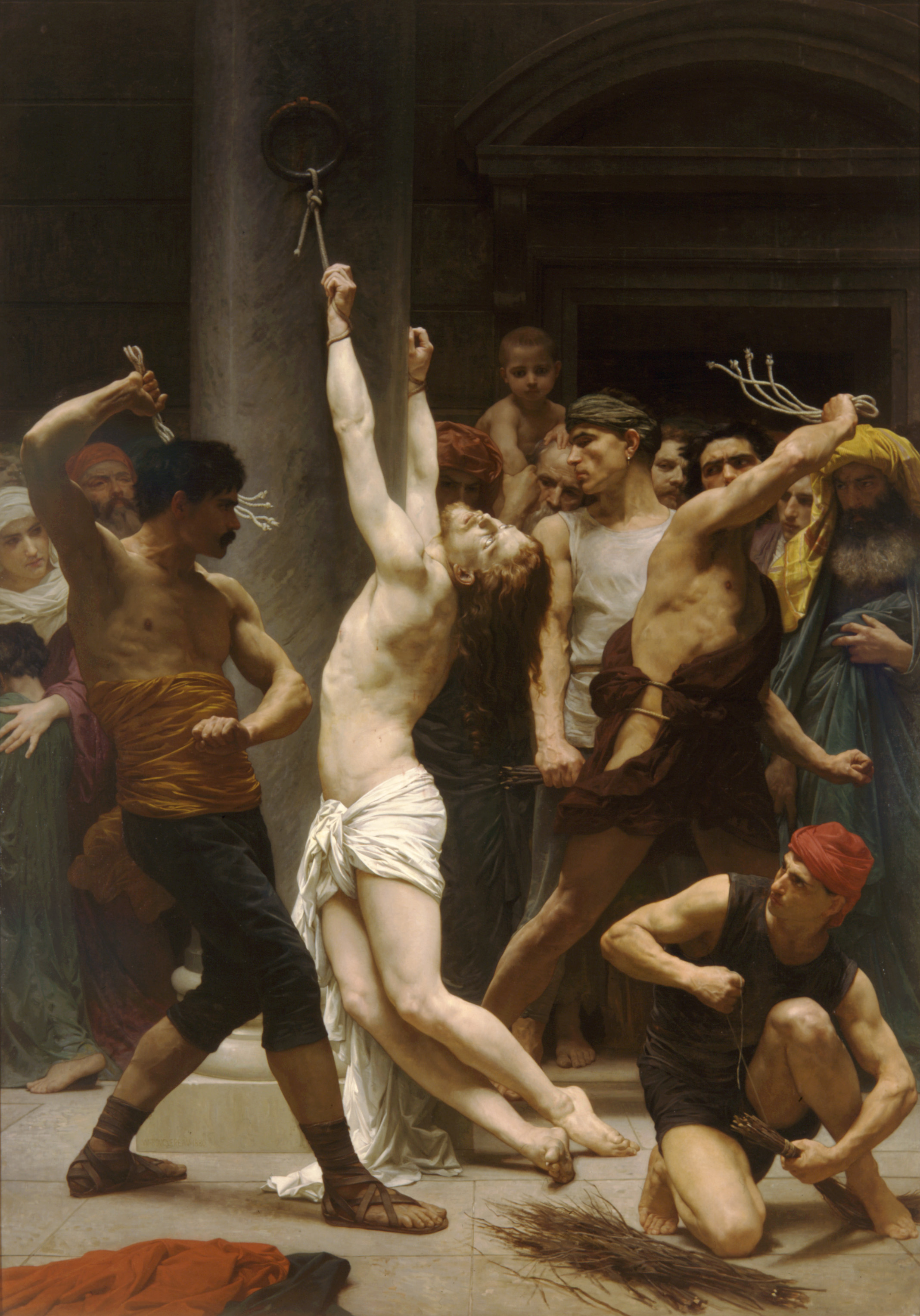
The Flagellation of Our Lord Jesus Christ (1880)

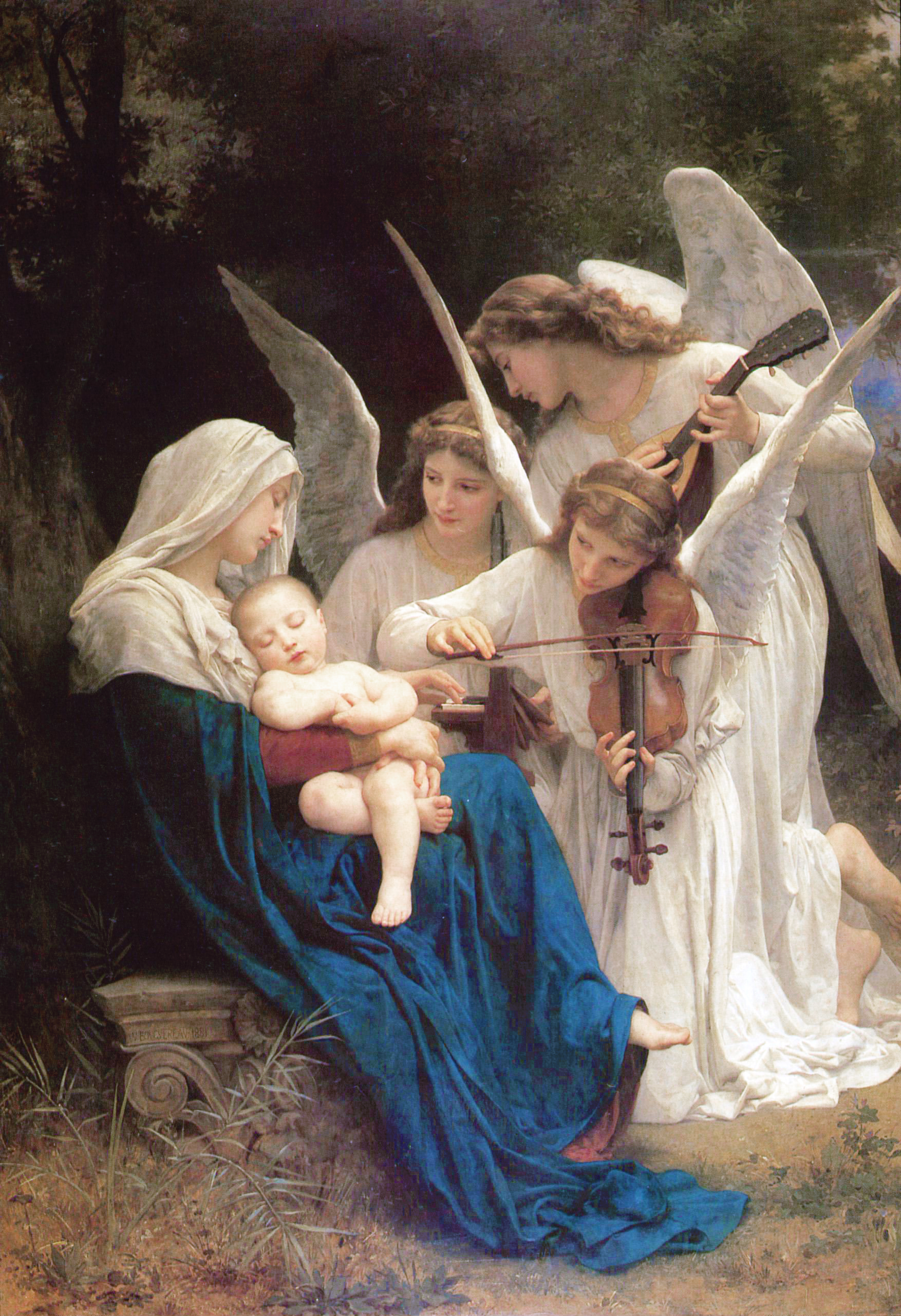
Song of the Angels (1881)

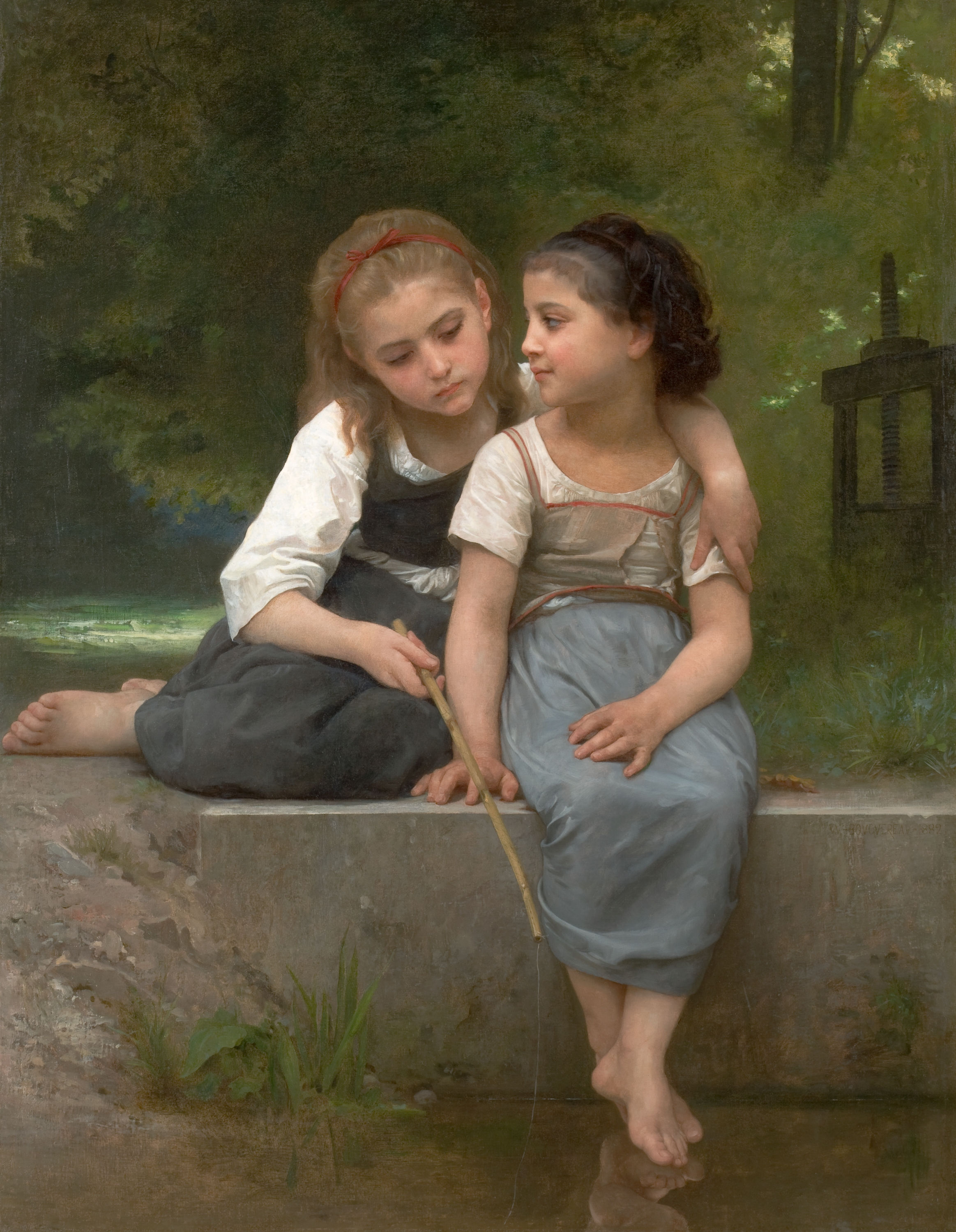
Fishing for Frogs (1882)

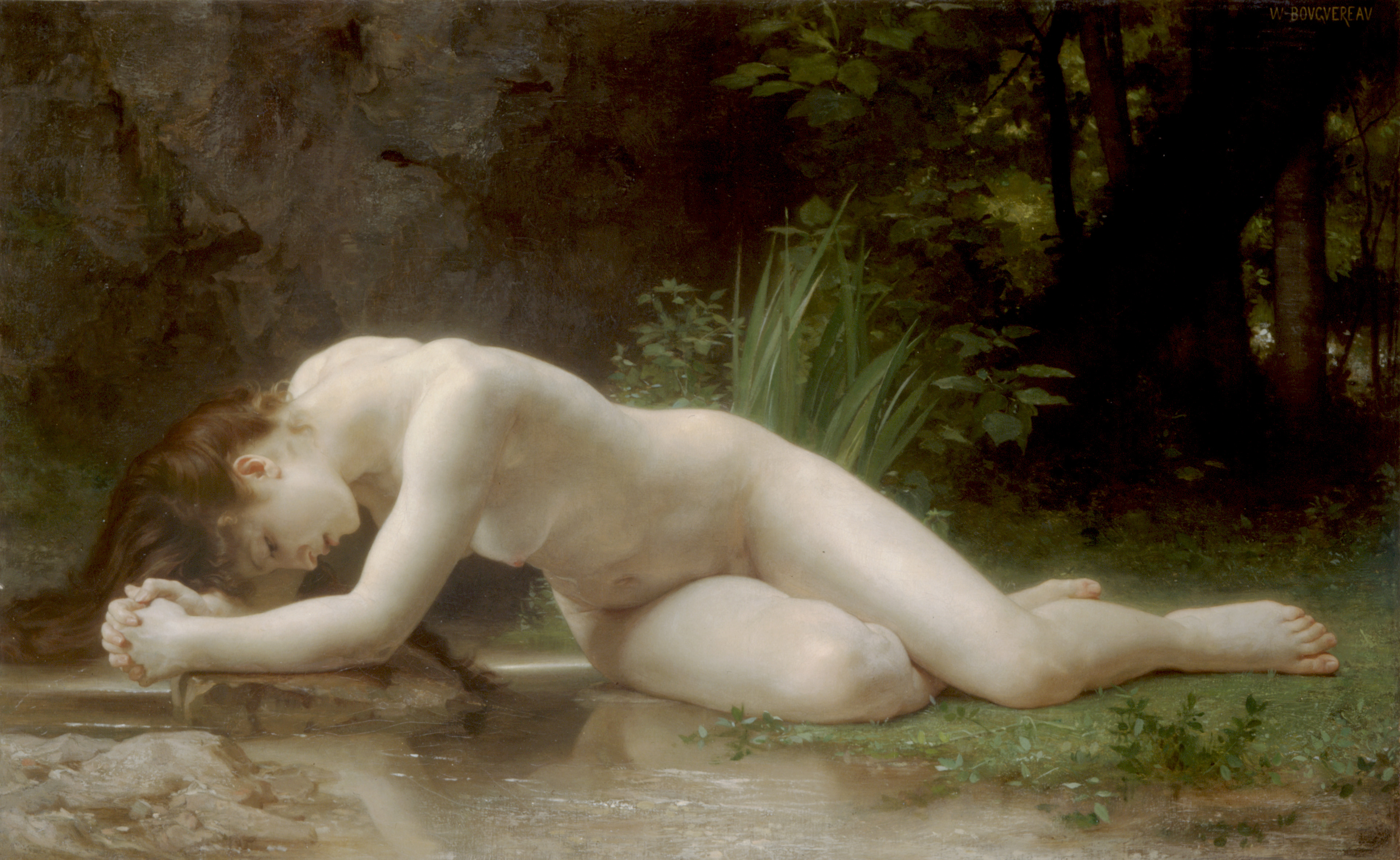
Byblis (1884)

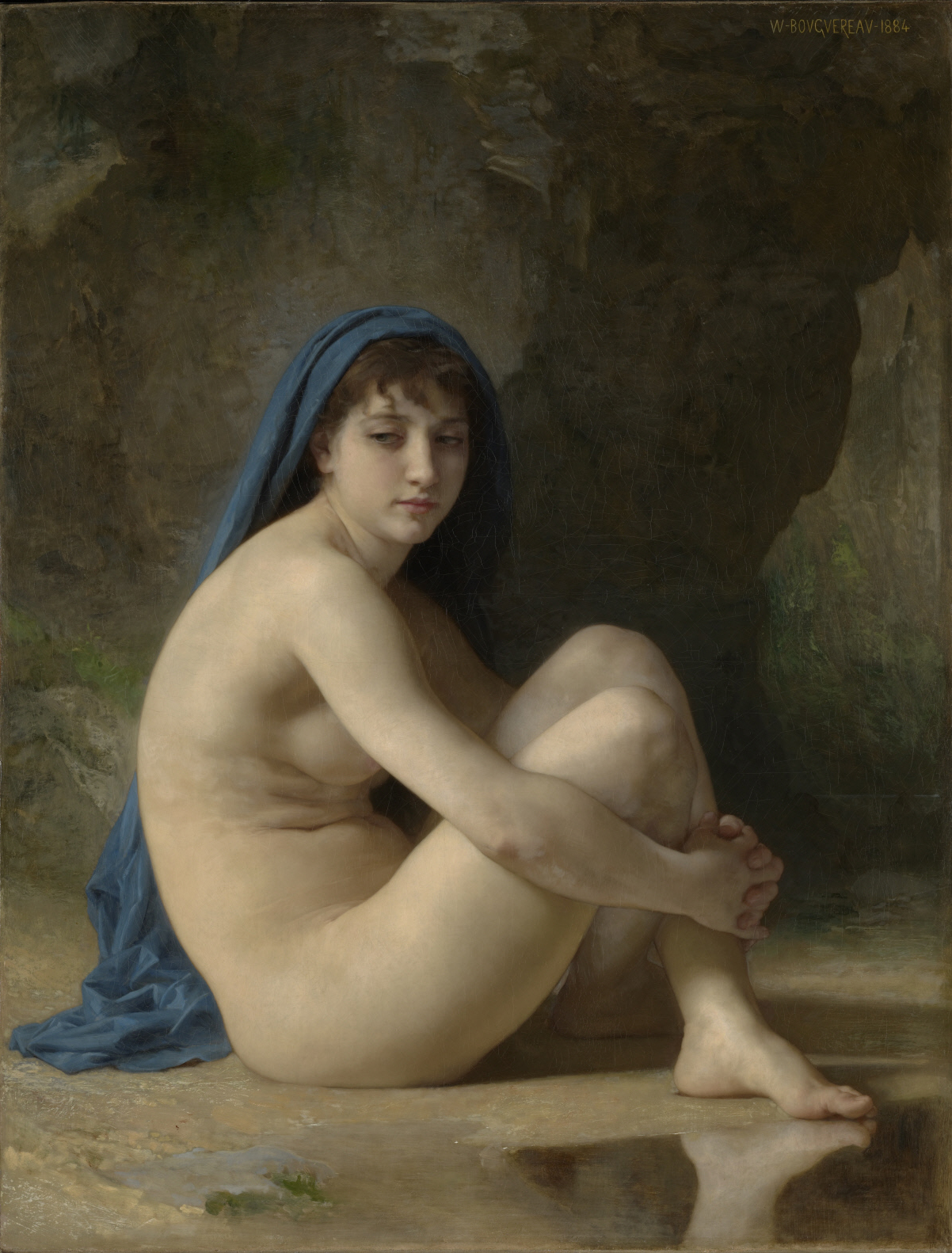
Seated Nude (1884)

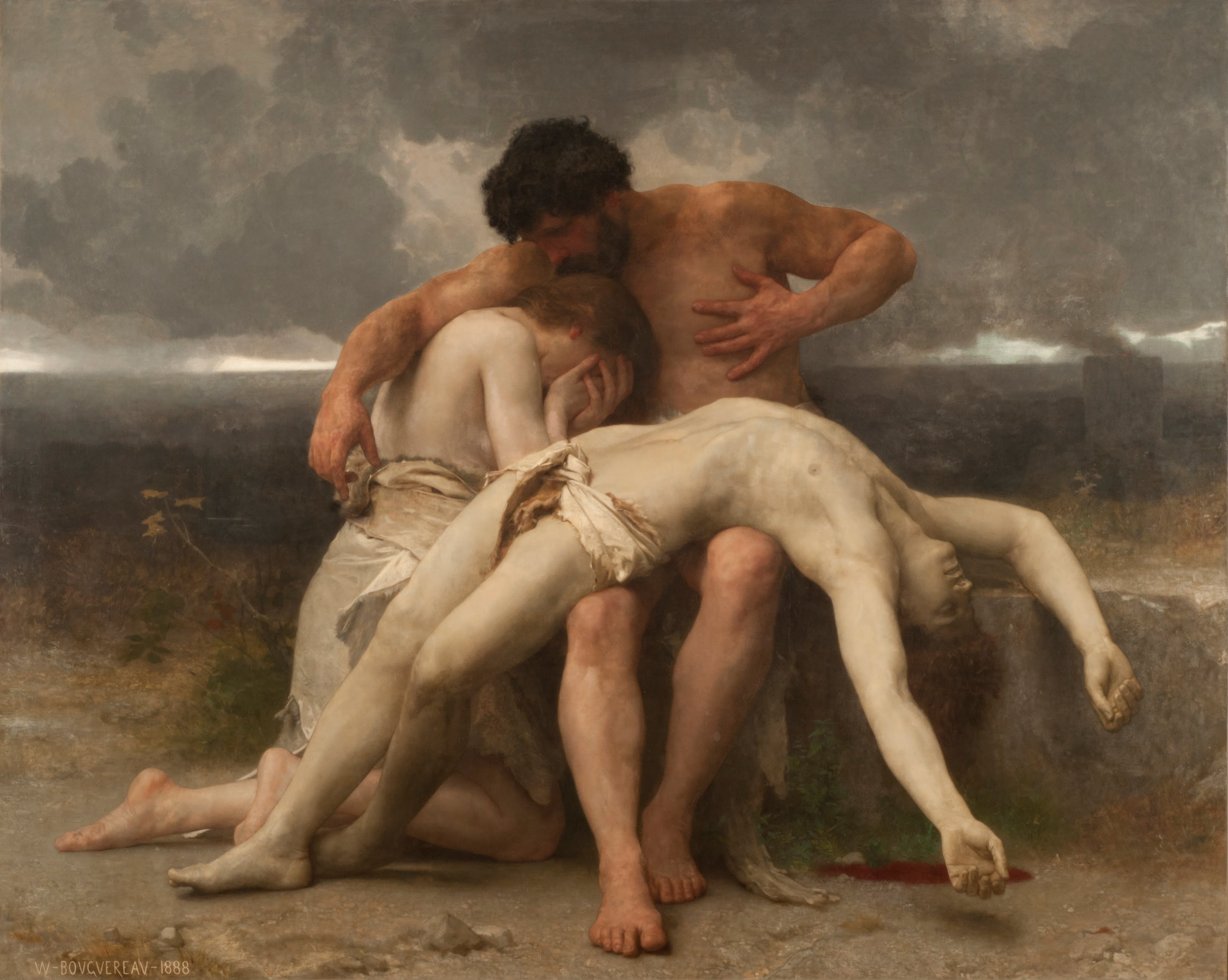
The First Mourning (1888)

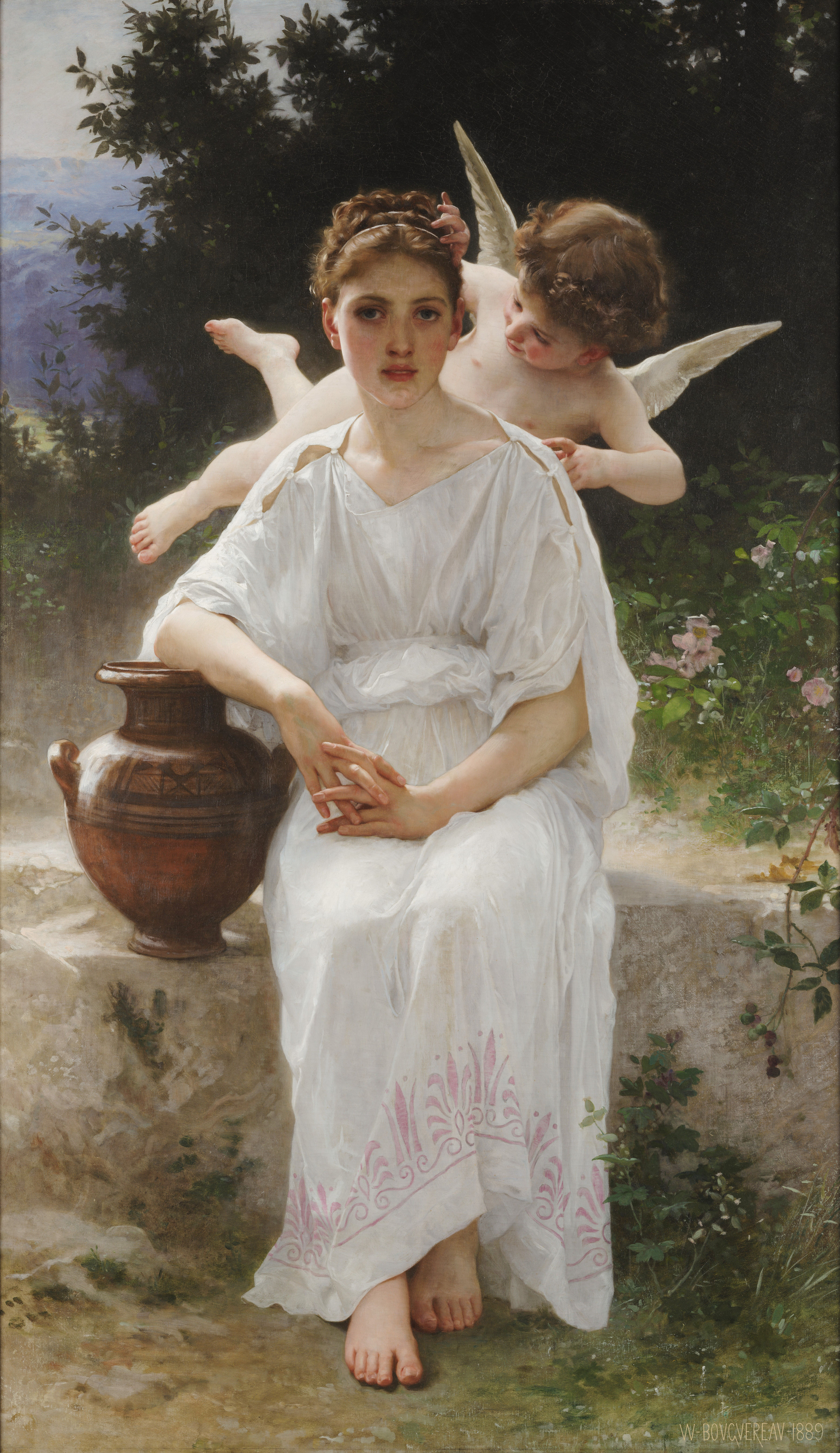
Les murmures de l'Amour (1889)

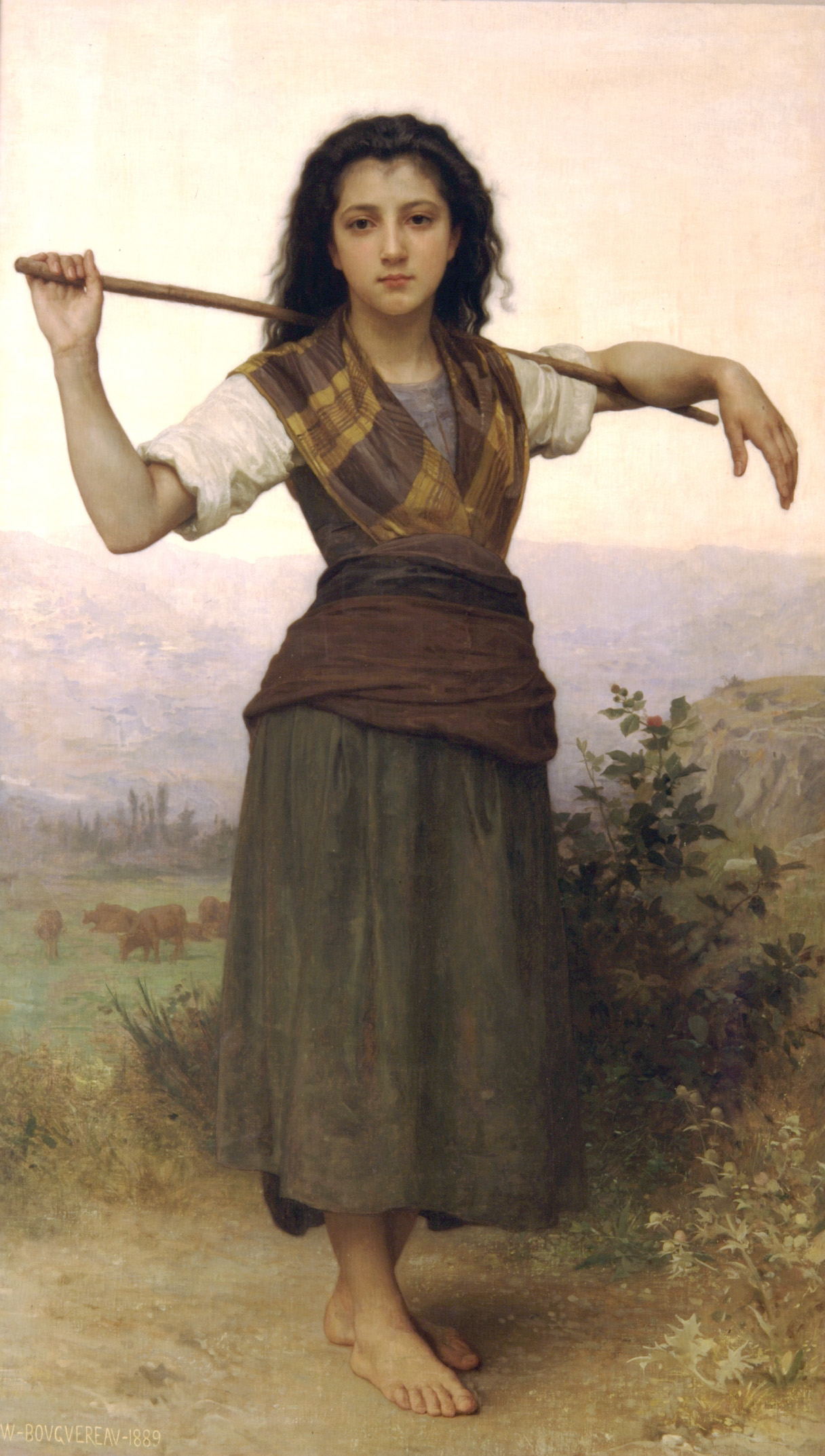
The Shepherdess (1889)

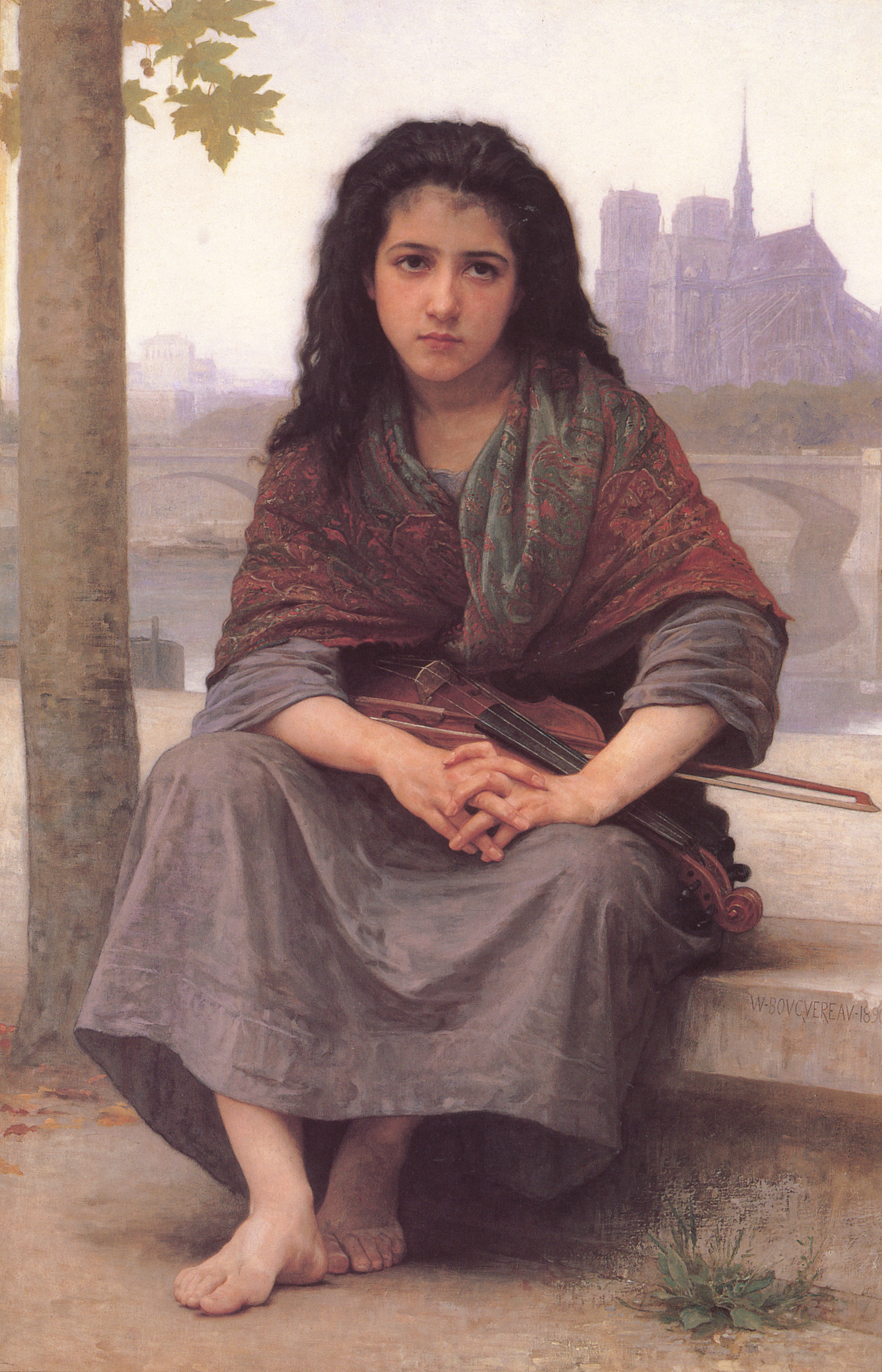
The Bohemian (1890)

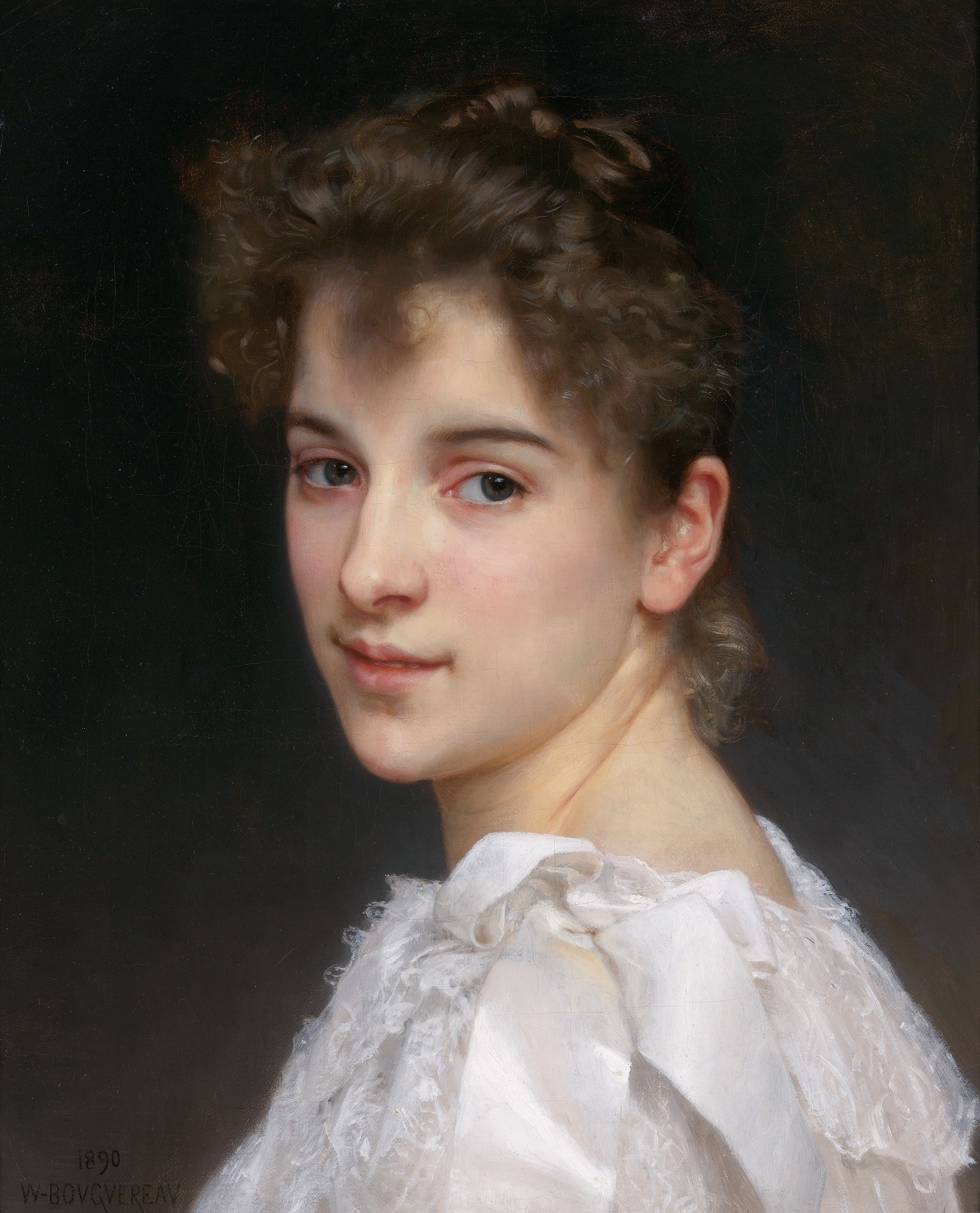
Gabrielle Cot, daughter of Pierre Auguste Cot (1890)

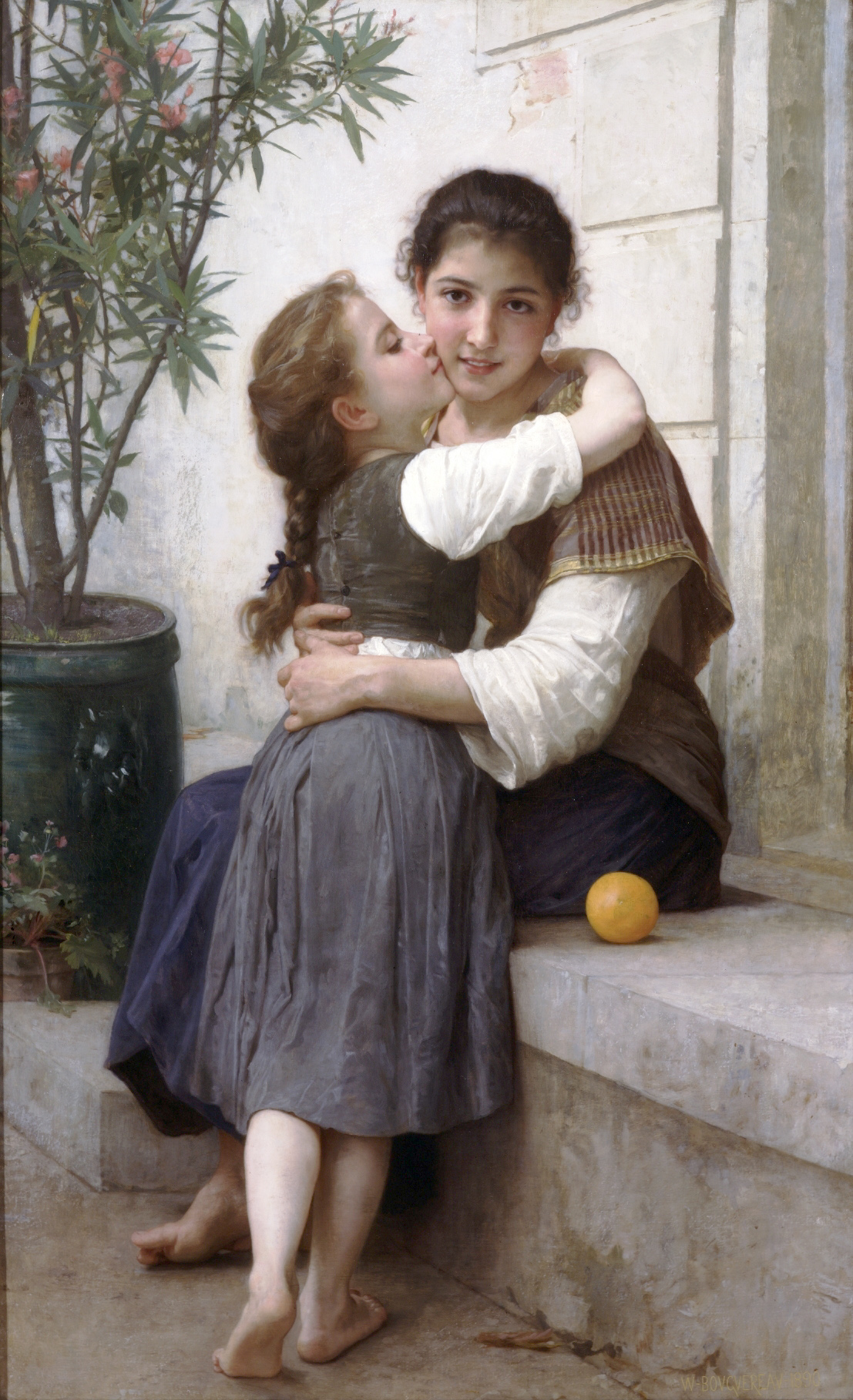
A Little Coaxing (1890)

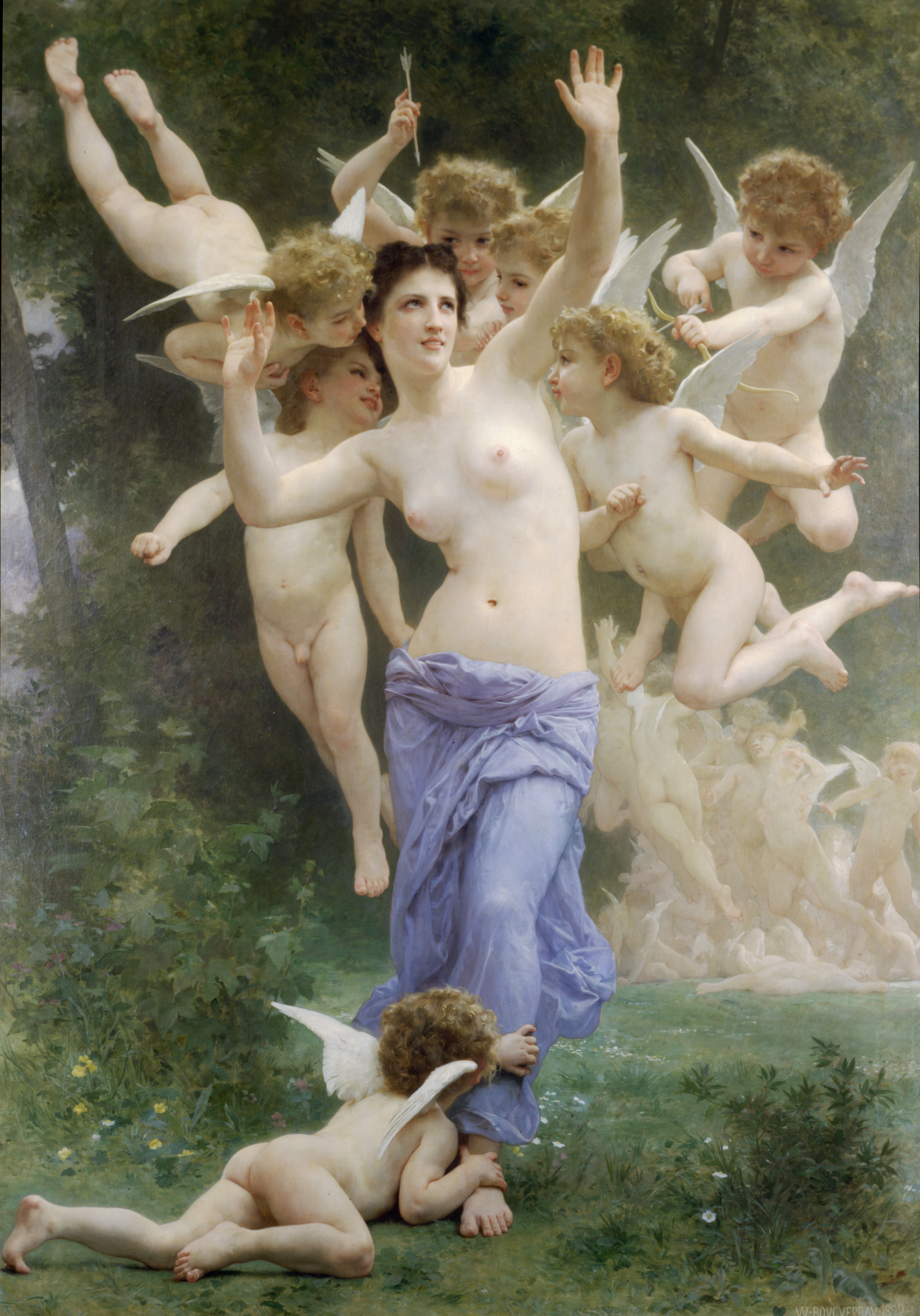
The Invasion (1892)

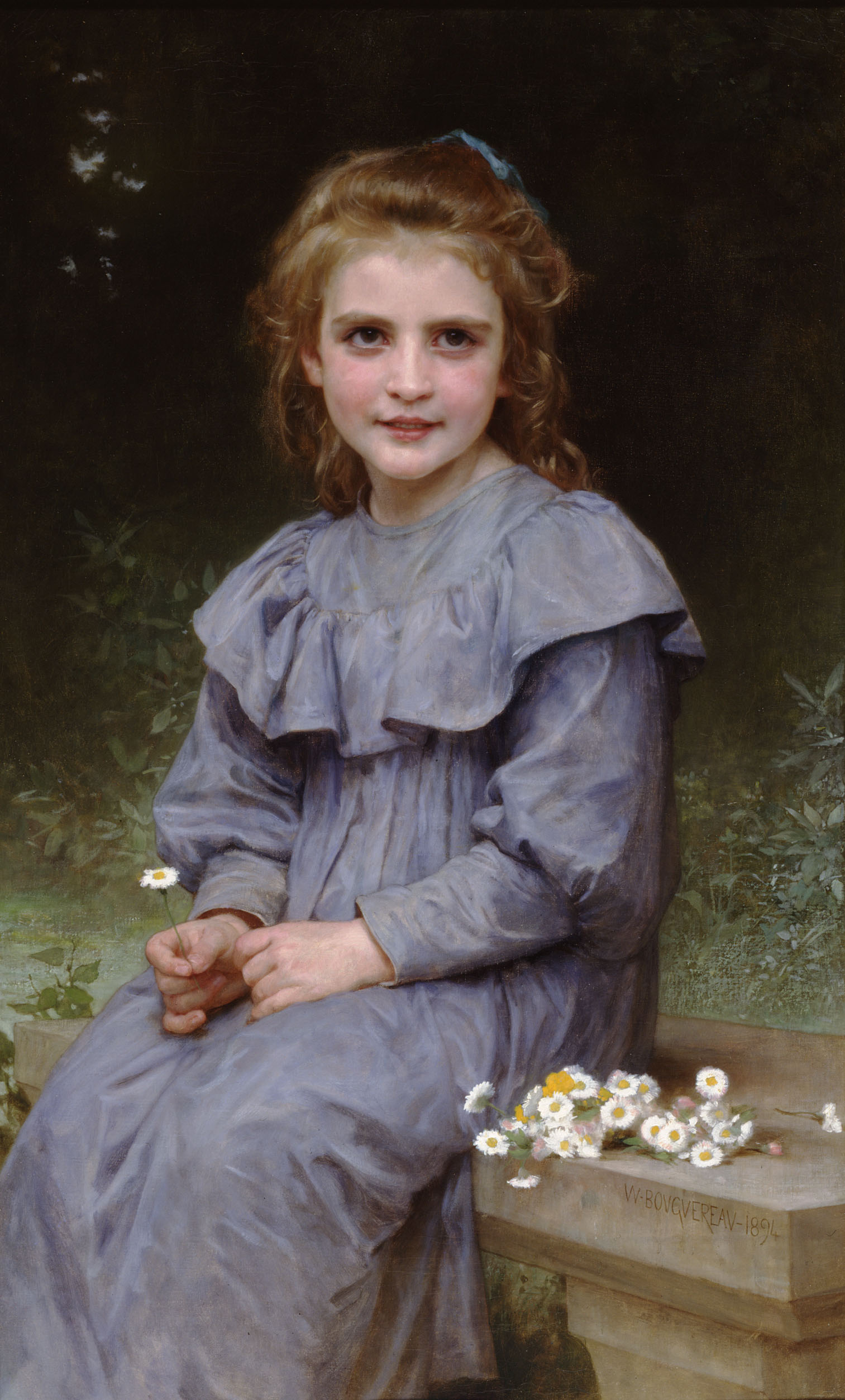
Daisies (1894)

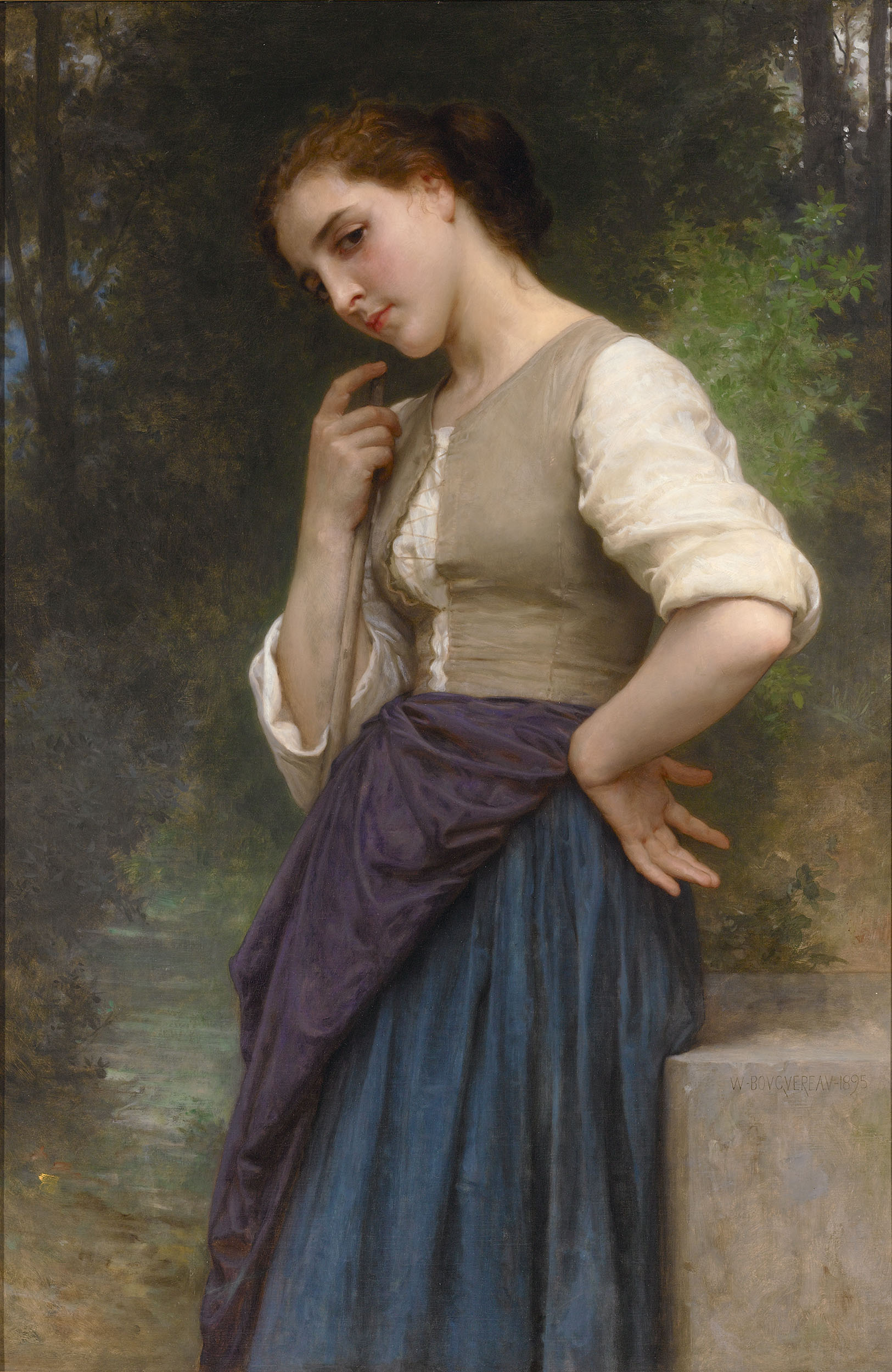
The Shepherdess (1895)

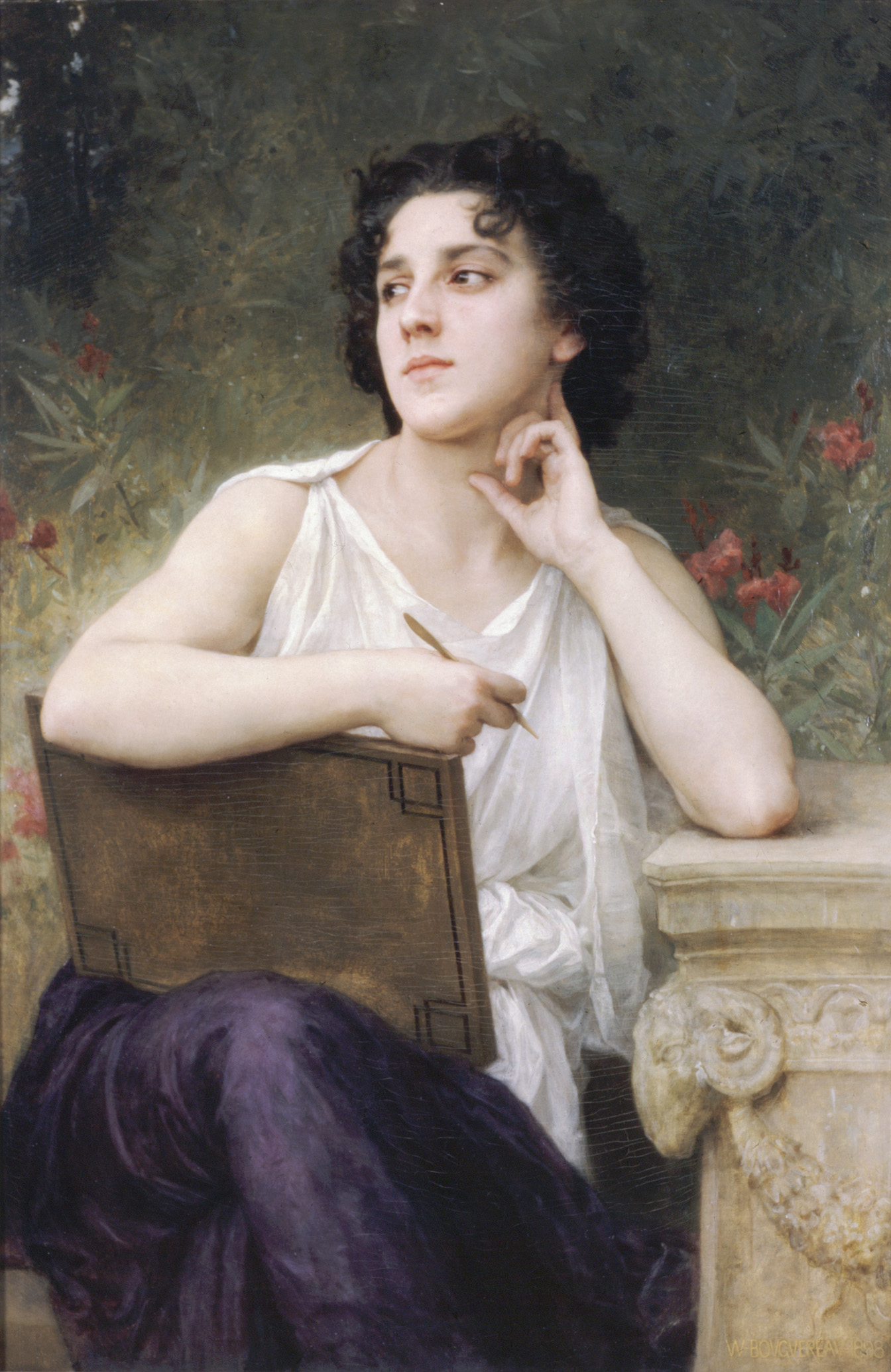
Inspiration (1898)

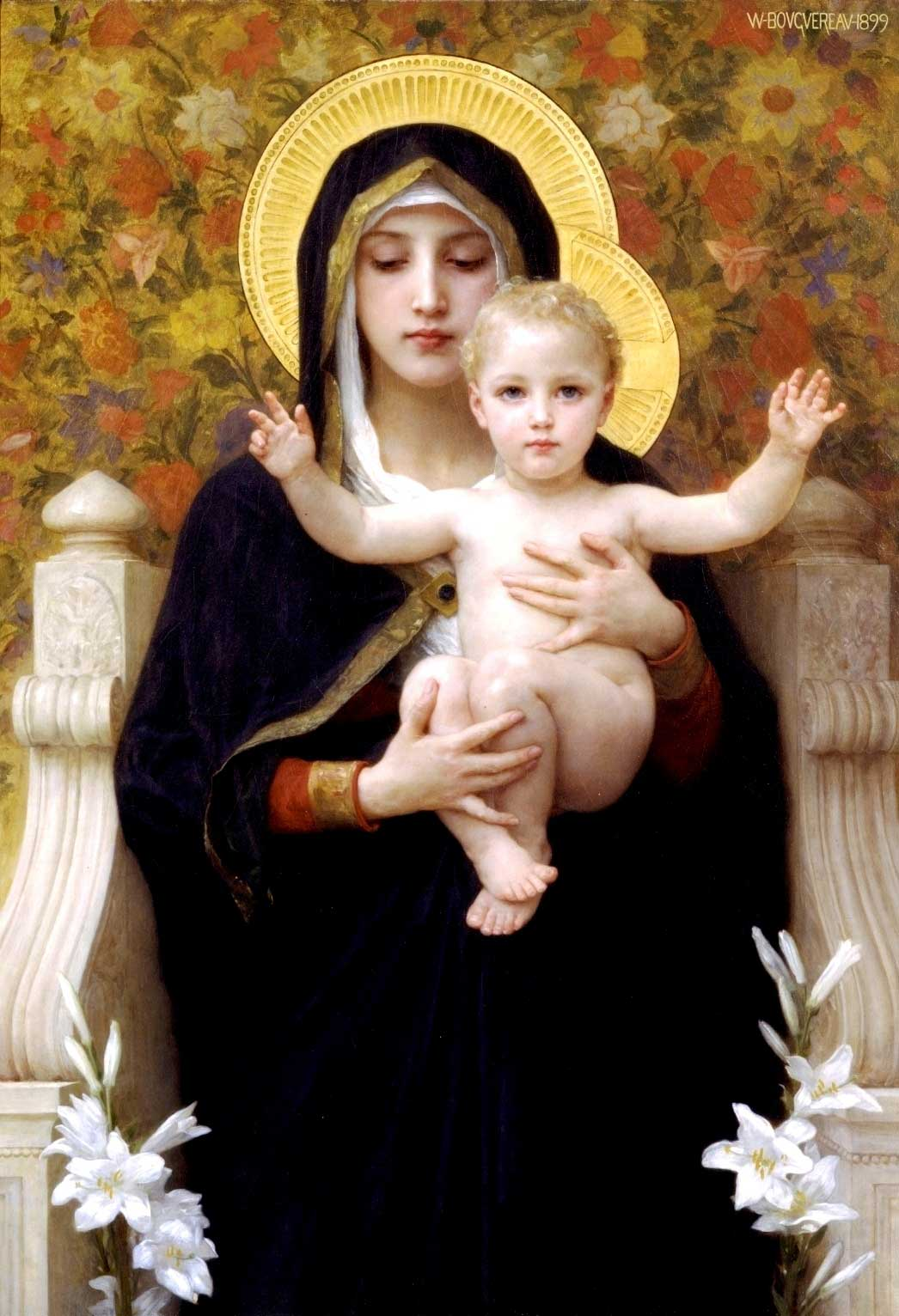
La Vierge au lys (The Virgin of the Lilies) (1899)

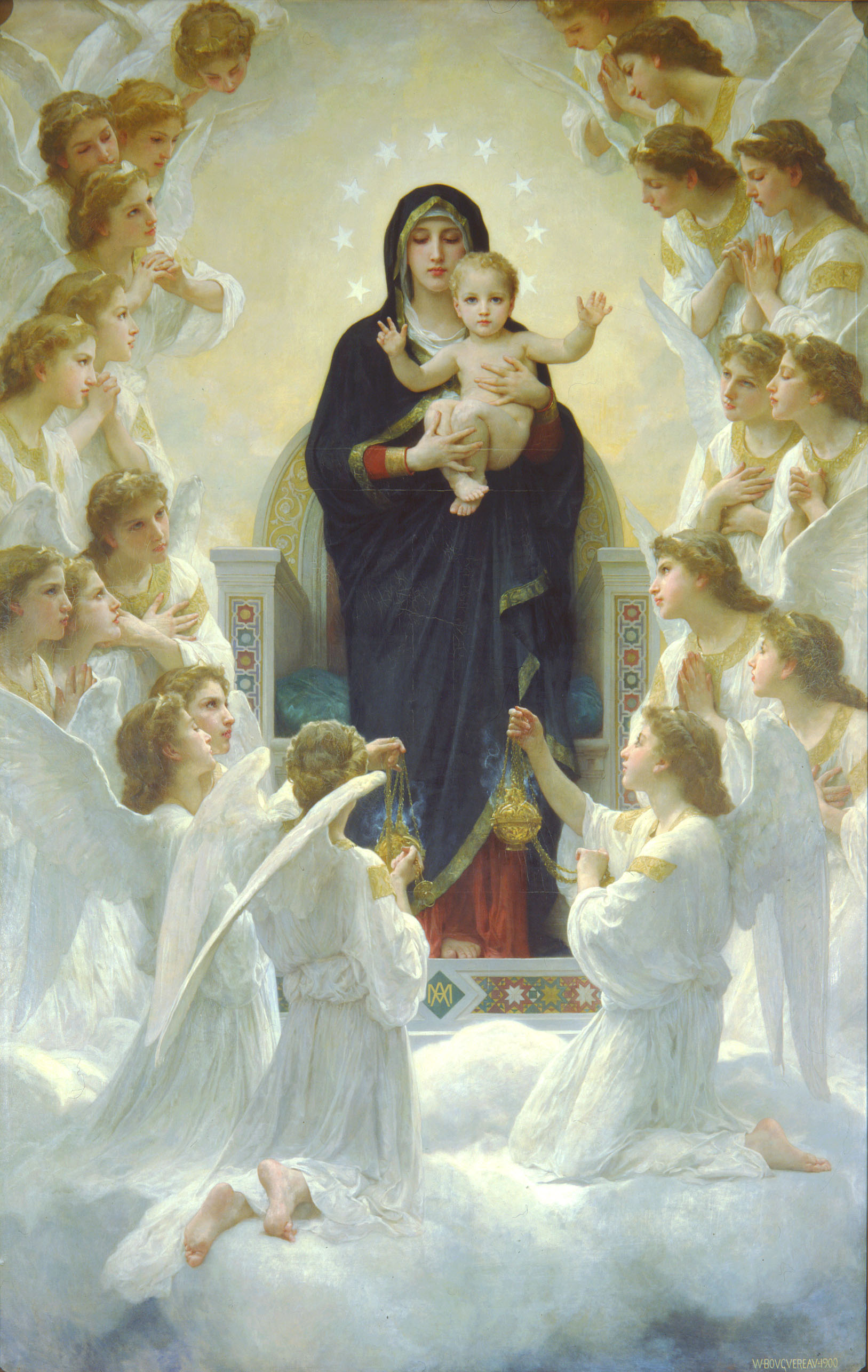
Regina Angelorum (The Queen of the Angels) (1900)

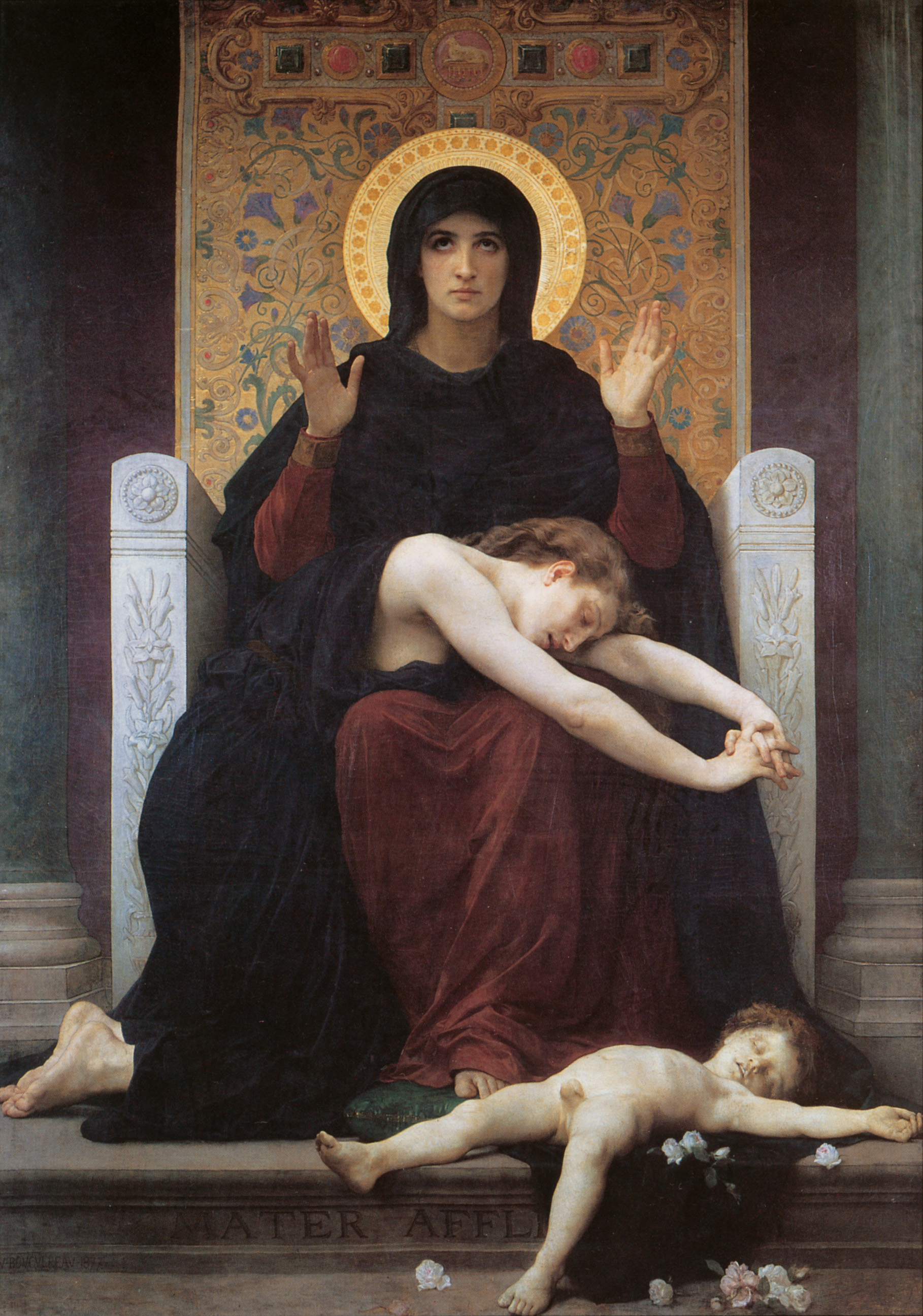
The Virgin of Consolation (1875)

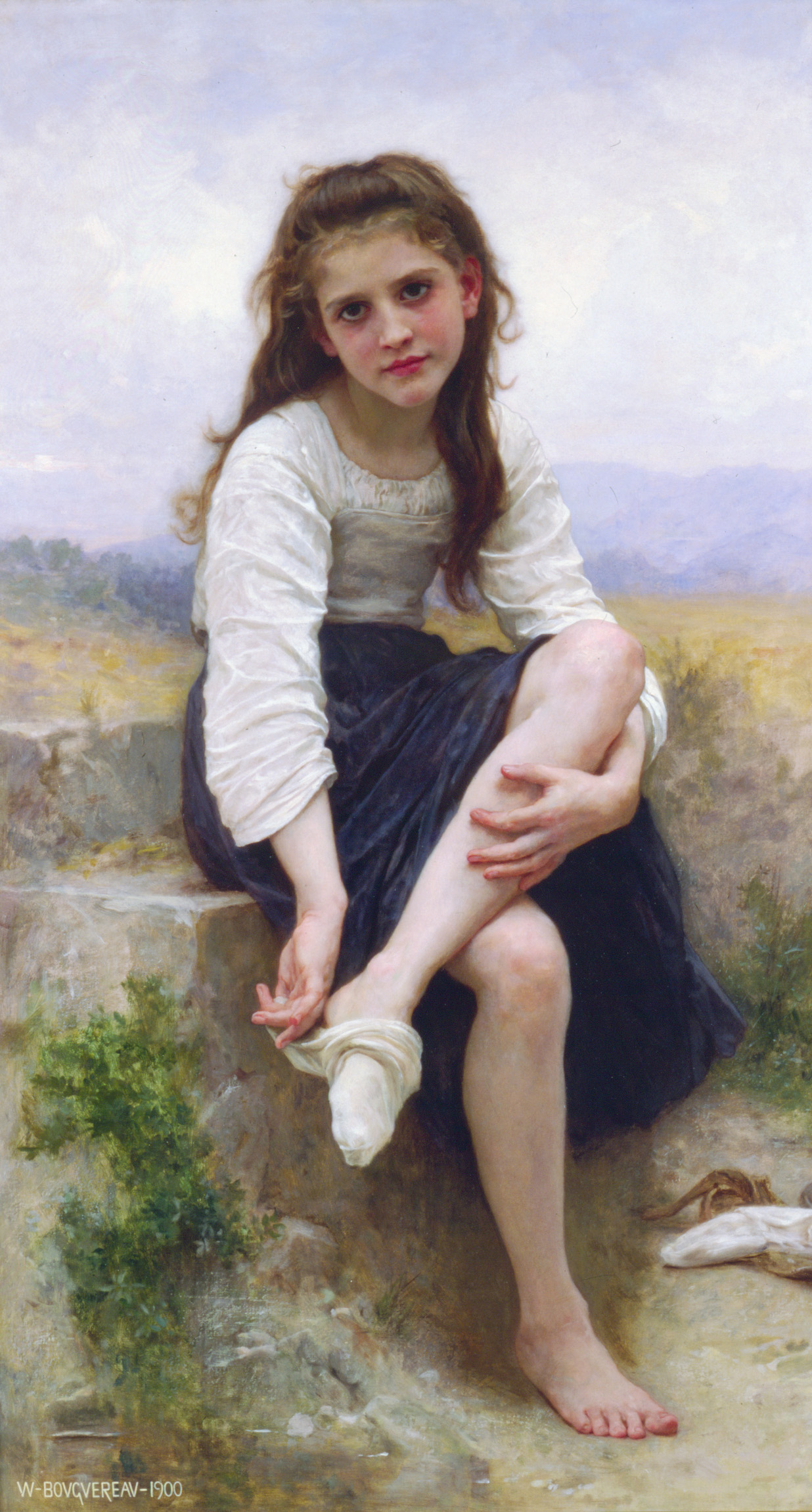
Before the Bath (1900)

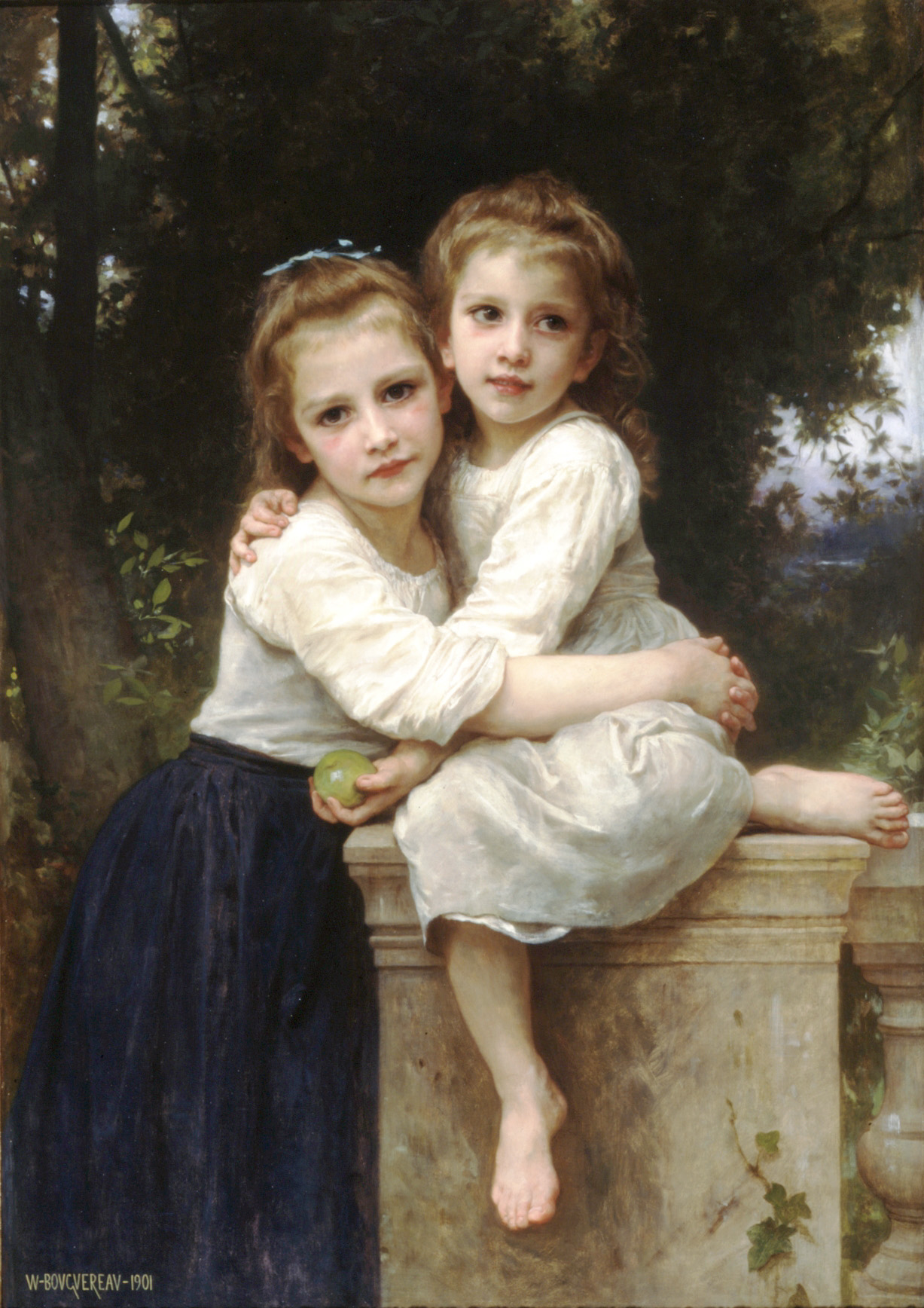
Two Sisters (1901)

== See also ==
- Gustave Doyen
- List of paintings by William-Adolphe Bouguereau
- Sir Lawrence Alma-Tadema
- The Broken Pitcher (painting)
