= Museo Nacional de Bellas Artes (Buenos Aires) =

Museum in Argentina

National Museum of Fine Arts
- Museo Nacional de Bellas Artes

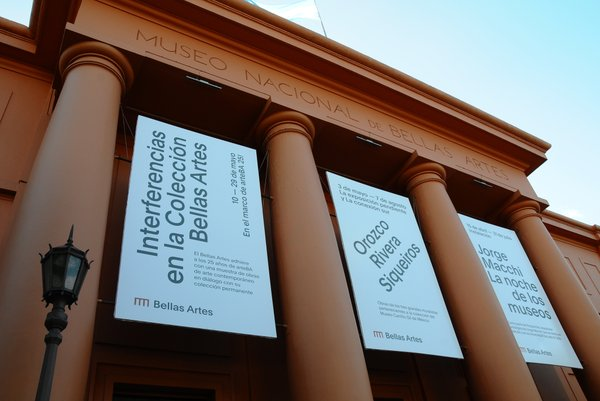
- Facade of the museum in 2017 Location within Buenos Aires
- Interactive fullscreen map
- Established: 25 December 1896; 129 years ago
- Location: Avenida del Libertador 1473; Buenos Aires, Argentina
- Coordinates: 34°35′02″S 58°23′35″W
- Type: Art museum
- Director: Andrés Duprat
- Website: bellasartes.gob.ar

The National Museum of Fine Arts (Spanish: Museo Nacional de Bellas Artes) is an Argentine art museum in Buenos Aires, located in the Recoleta section of the city. The Museum inaugurated a branch in Neuquén in 2004. The museum hosts works by Goya, Rembrandt, Van Gogh, Rodin, Manet, and Chagall, among other artists.

== History ==
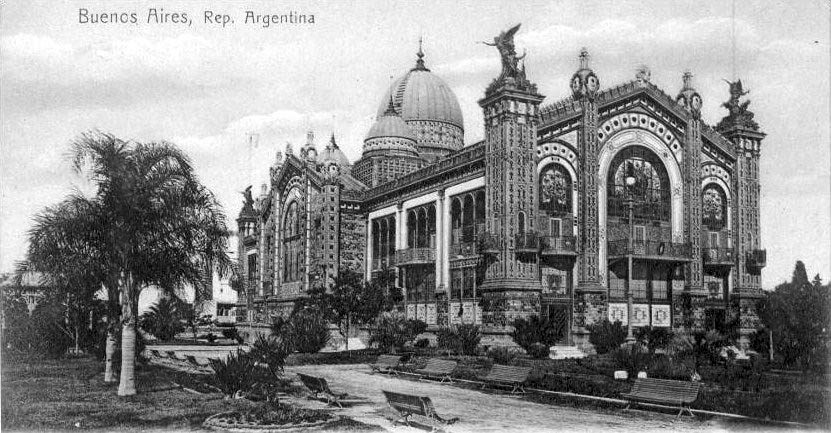
Former Argentine Pavilion at the Universal Exhibition served as seat of the museum in Plaza San Martín from 1910 to 1932

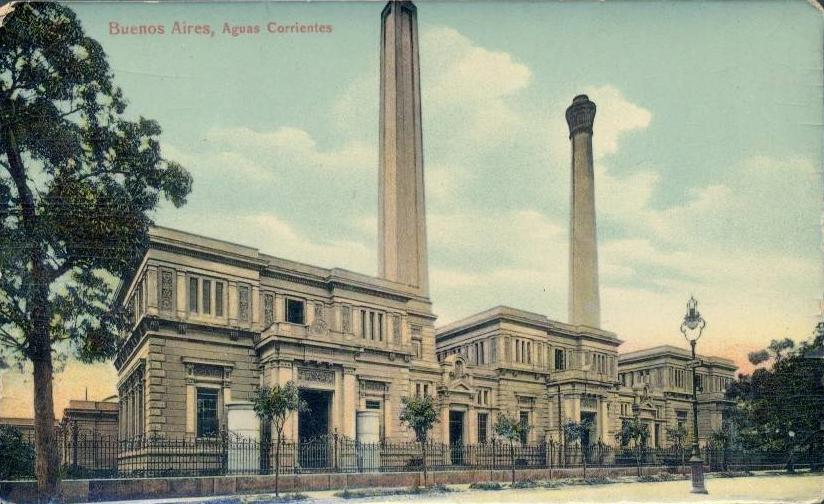
The Casa de Bombas building c. 1900, the current location of the museum

Argentine painter and art critic Eduardo Schiaffino, was the first director of the museum, which opened on 25 December 1895, in a building on Florida Street that today houses the Galerías Pacífico shopping mall. In 1909, the museum moved to a building in Plaza San Martín, originally erected in Paris as the Argentine Pavilion for the 1889 Paris exhibition, and later dismantled and brought to Buenos Aires. In its new home, the museum became part of the International Centenary Exhibition held in Buenos Aires in 1910. Following the demolition of the pavilion in 1932, as part of the remodelling of Plaza San Martín, the museum was transferred to its present location in 1943, a building originally constructed in 1870 as a drainage pumping station and adapted to its current use by architect Alejandro Bustillo.

The museum was modernised both physically and in its collections during the 1955–'64 tenure of director Jorge Romero Brest. A temporary exhibits pavilion opened in 1961, and the museum acquired a large volume of modern art though its collaboration with the Torcuato di Tella Institute, a leading promoter of local, avant-garde artists, and elsewhere; a contemporary Argentine art pavilion opened in 1980. This 1,536 square metres (16,533 sq ft) hall is the largest of 34 currently in use at the museum, which totals 4,610 square metres (49,622 sq ft) of exhibit space. Its permanent collection totals 688 major works and over 12,000 sketches, fragments, potteries, and other minor works. The institution also maintains a specialised library, totalling 150,000 volumes, as well as a public auditorium. The museum commissioned architect Mario Roberto Álvarez to design a branch in the Patagonian region city of Neuquén. Inaugurated in 2004, this museum has four exhibit halls totaling 2,500 square metres (26,910 sq ft) and a permanent collection of 215 works, as well as temporary exhibits and a public auditorium.

The ground floor of the museum holds 24 exhibit halls housing a fine international collection of paintings from the Middle Ages up to the 20th century, together with the museum's art history library. The first floor's eight exhibit halls contain a collection of paintings by some of the most important 20th-century Argentine painters, including Antonio Berni, Ernesto de la Cárcova, Benito Quinquela Martín, Eduardo Sívori, Sarah Grilo, Alfredo Guttero, Raquel Forner, Xul Solar, Marcelo Pombo and Lino Enea Spilimbergo. The second floor's two halls, completed in 1984, hold an exhibition of photographs and two sculpture terraces, as well as most of the institution's administrative and technical departments.

== Gallery ==
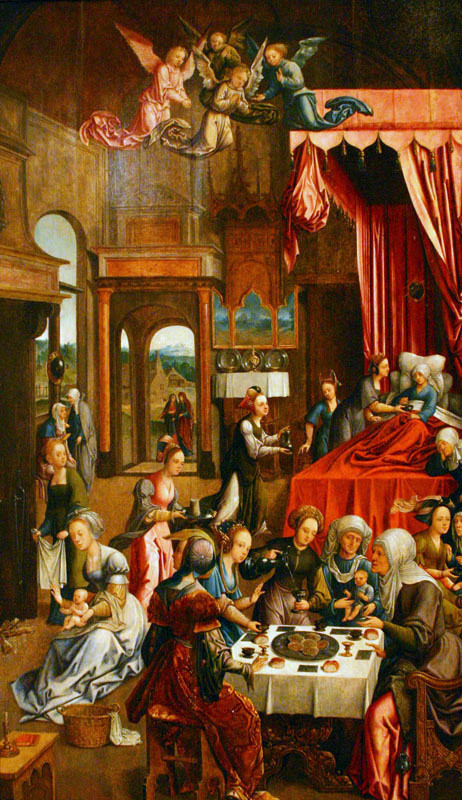
Dutch Renaissance, The Birth of Virgin Mary, Jacob Cornelisz van Oostsanen, late 15th or early 16th century

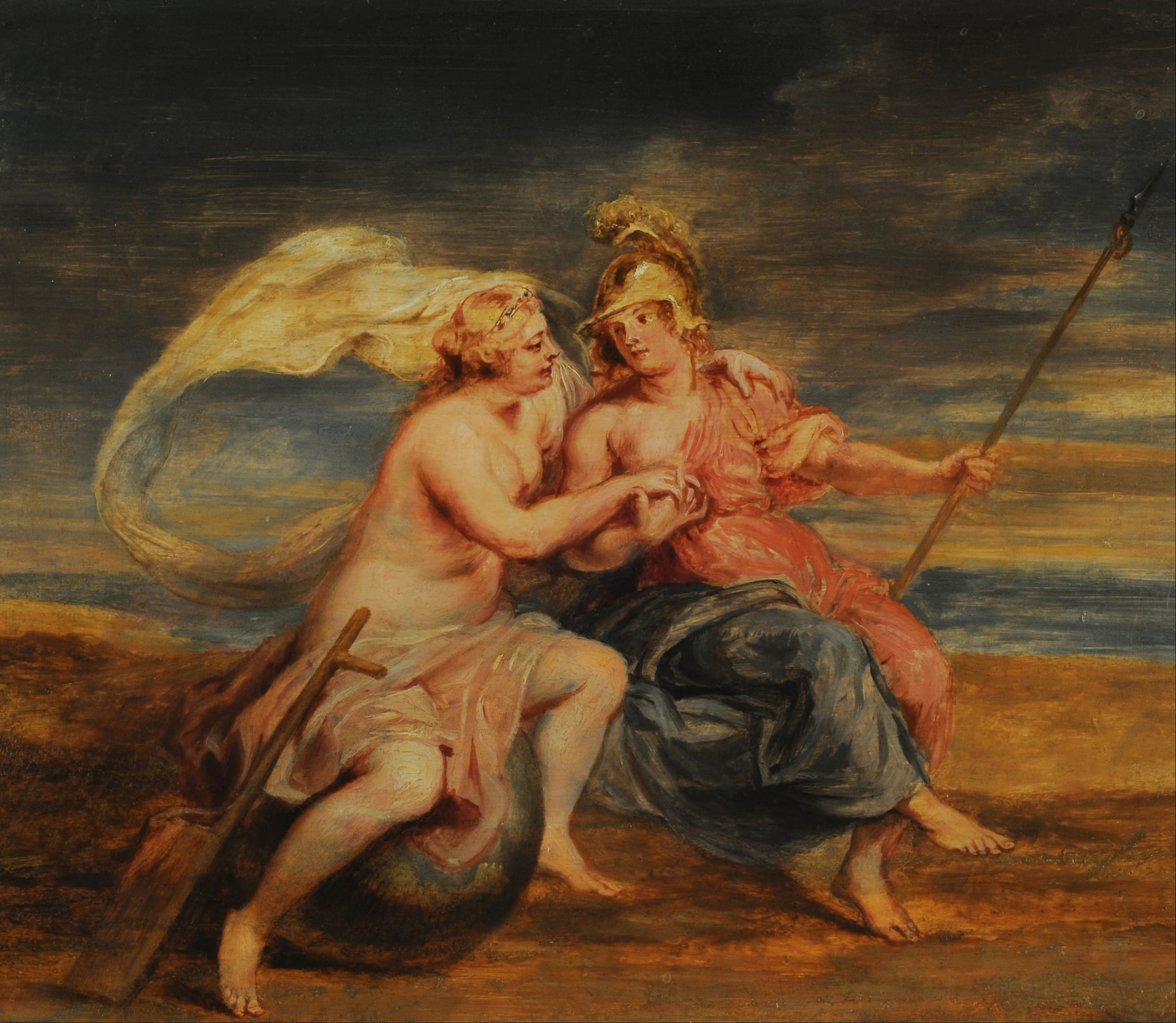
Flemish Baroque, Allegory of Fortune and Virtue, Rubens, 17th century

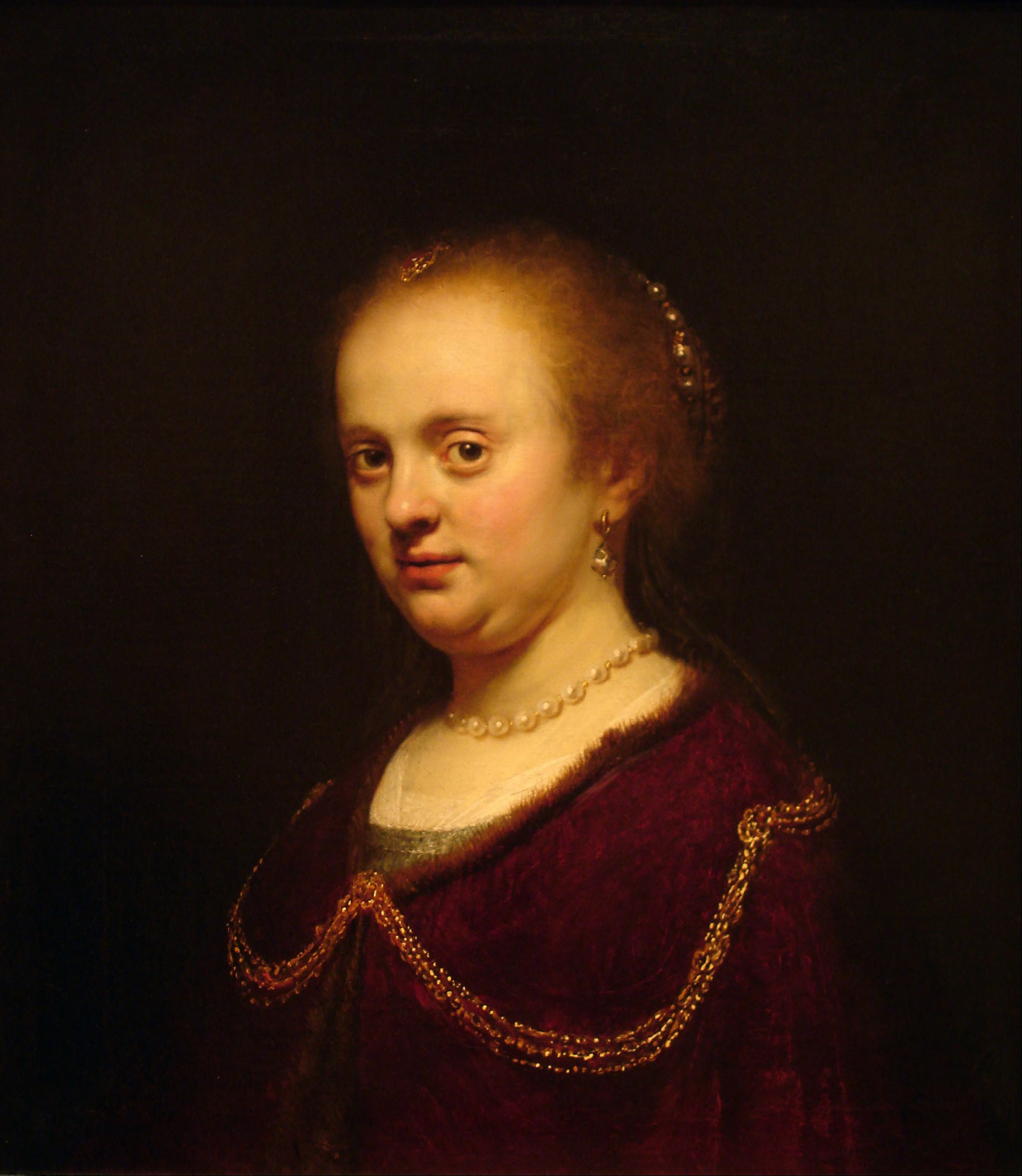
Dutch Baroque, Portrait of Young Woman, Rembrandt, 1634

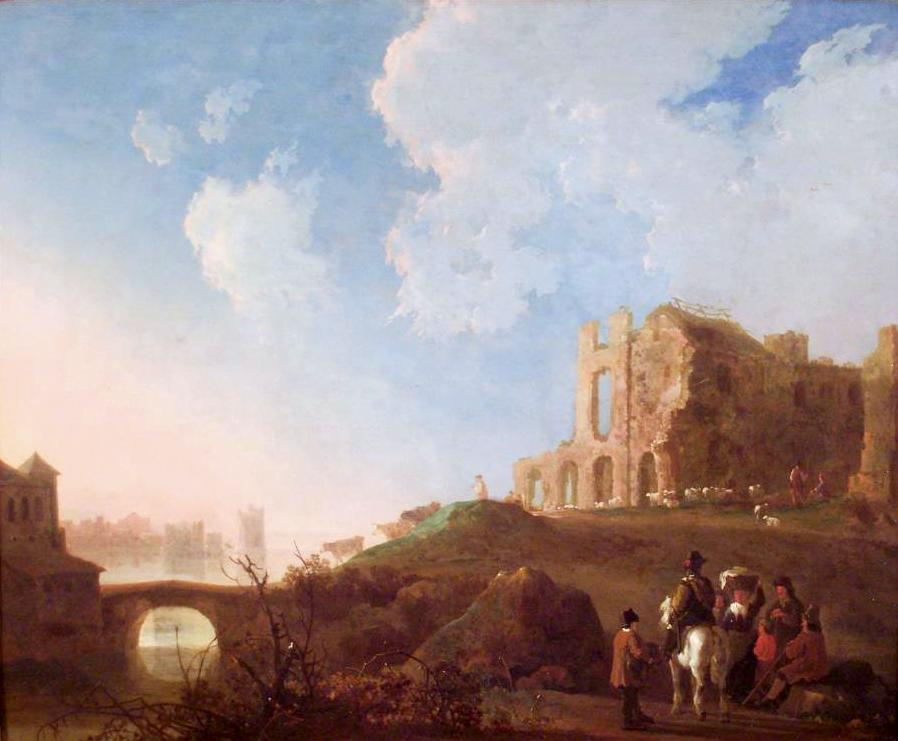
Dutch Baroque, Landscape with the Ruins of the Abbey of Rijnsburg, Aelbert Cuyp, 1645

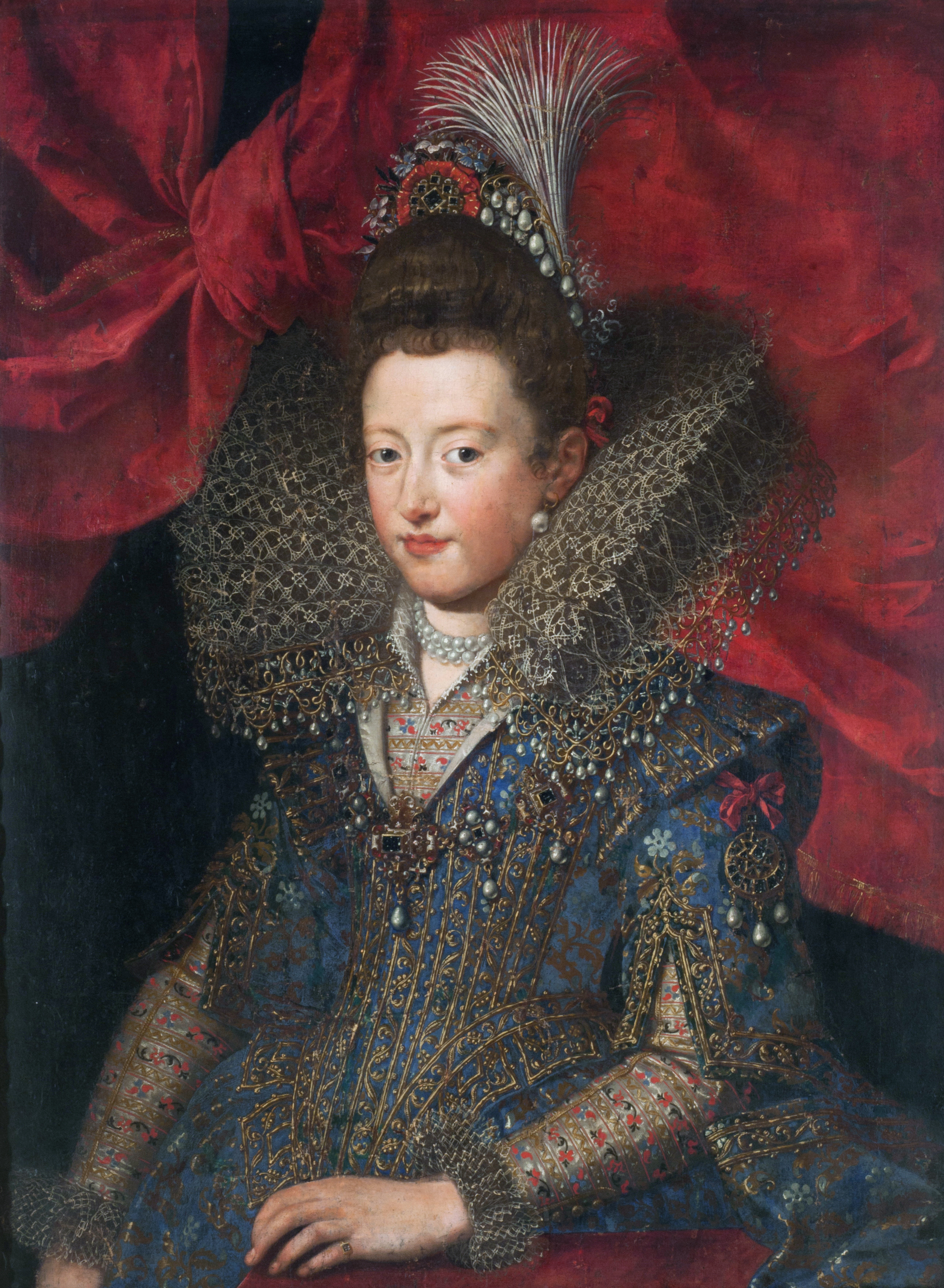
Flemish Baroque, Portrait of Margarita Gonzaga, Frans Pourbus the Younger, 1603

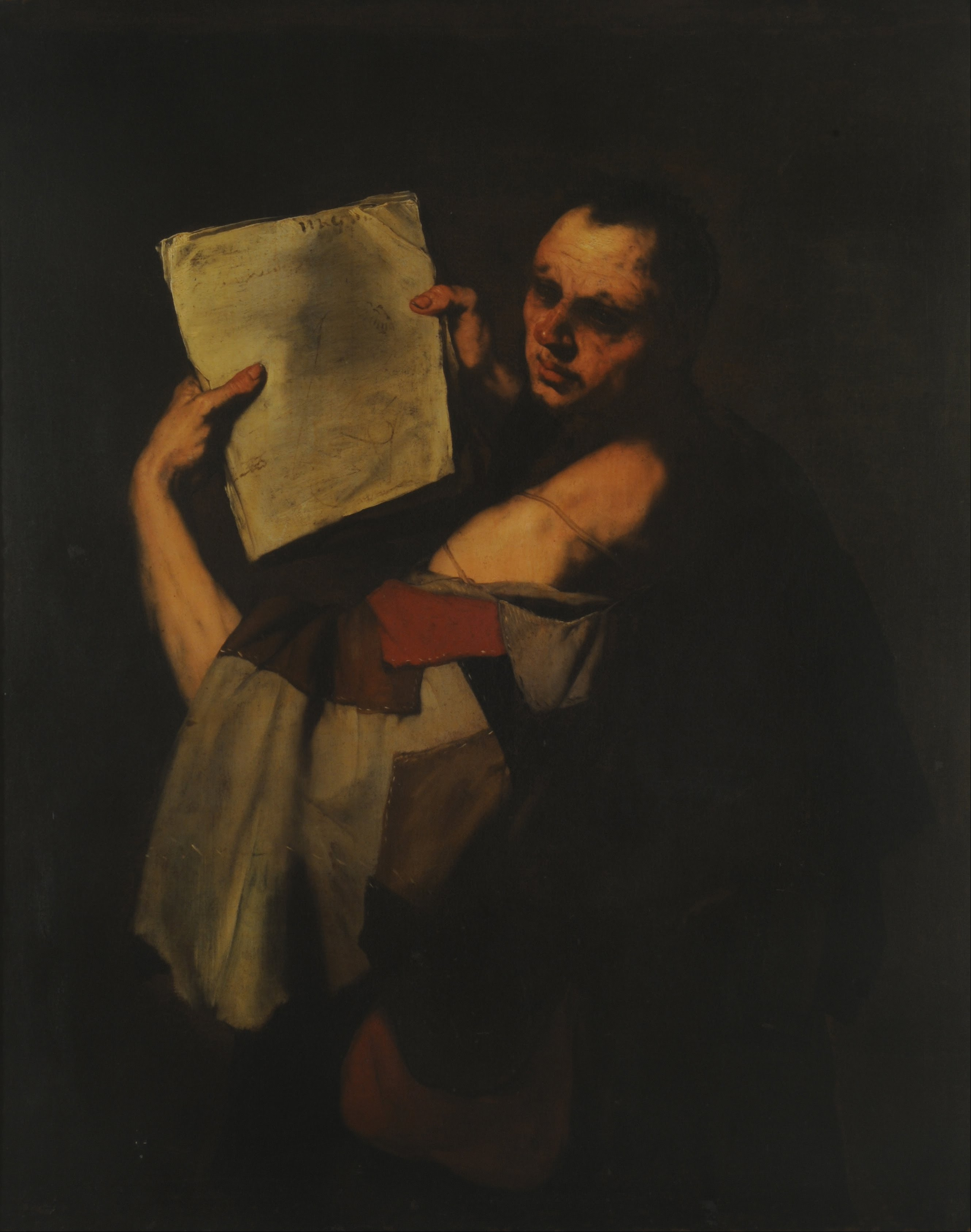
Spanish Baroque, An astronomer, Jusepe de Ribera, 1617–1652

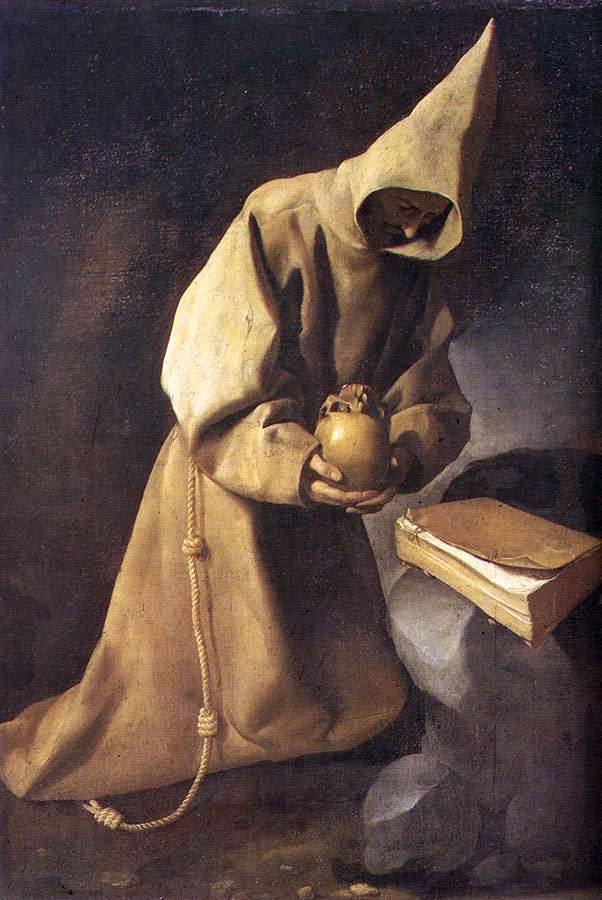
Spanish Baroque, Saint Francis in Meditation, Francisco de Zurbarán, 1632

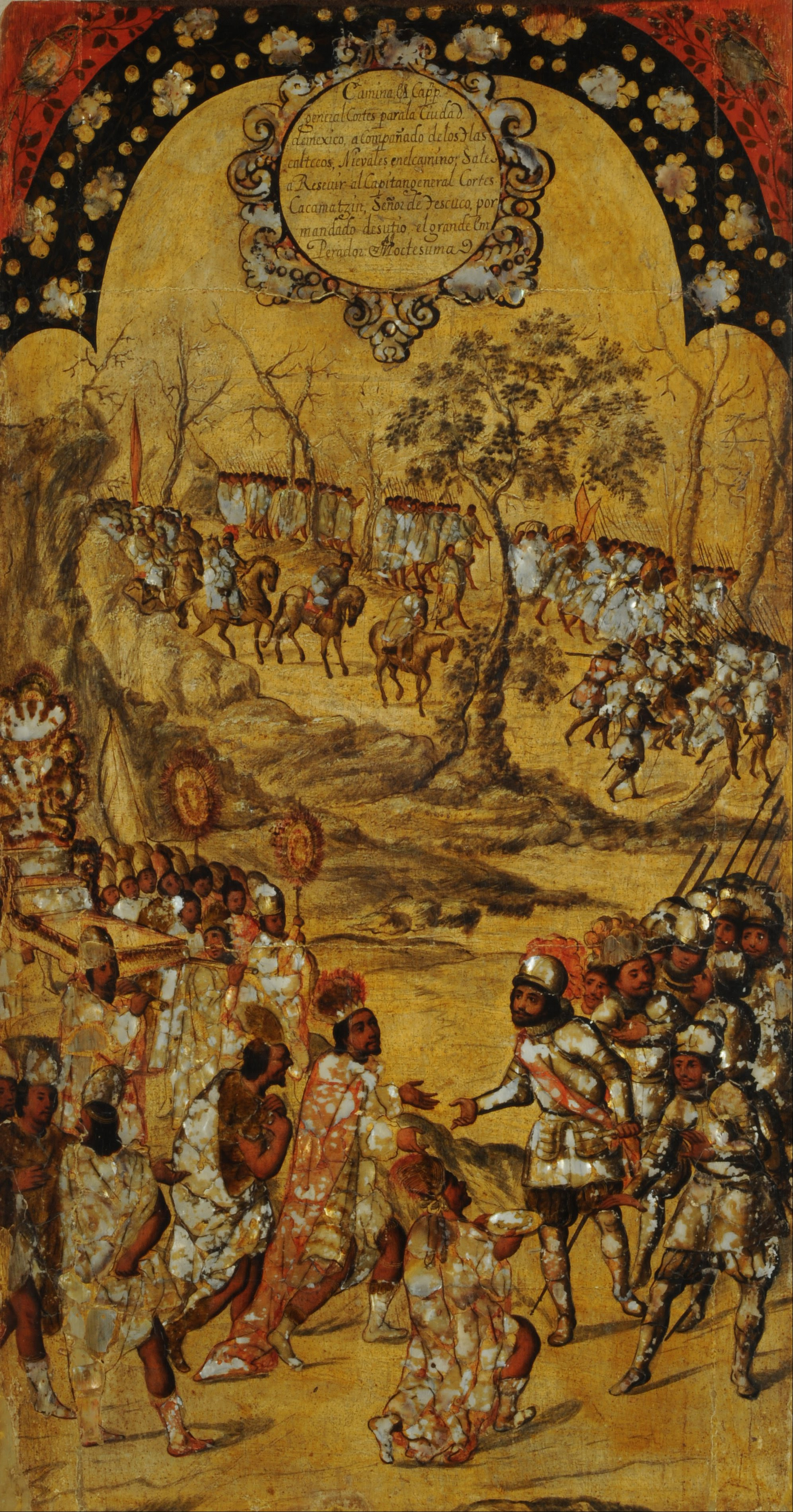
Mexican Baroque, The Conquest of Mexico. Table VIII, Miguel Gonzales, 1696/1715

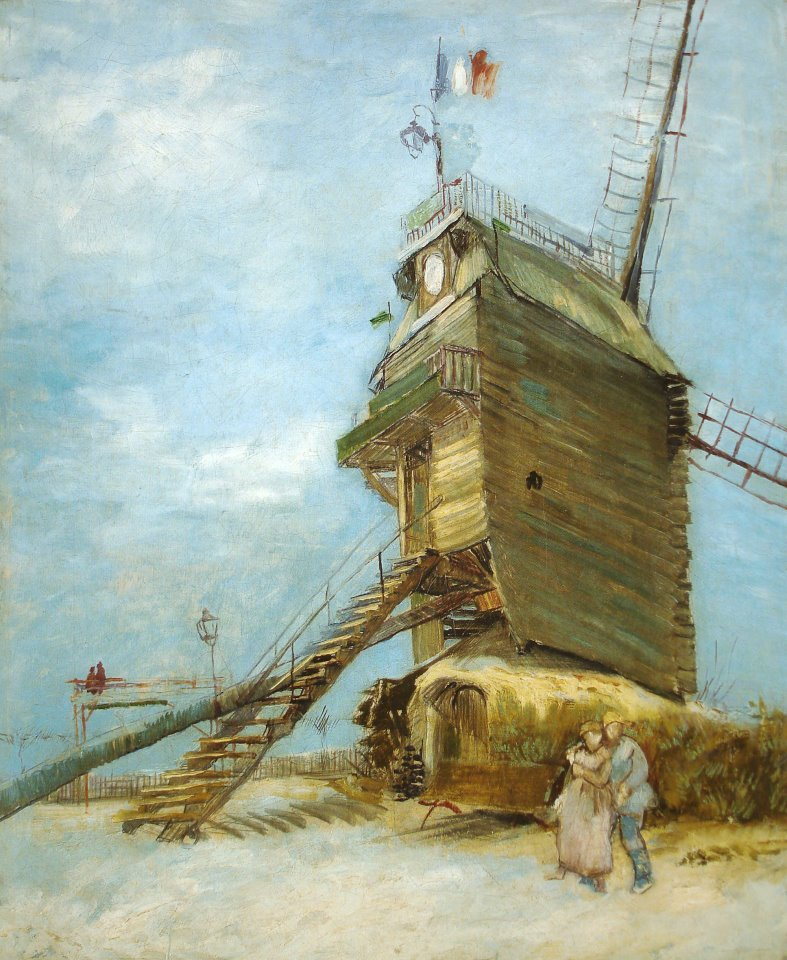
Dutch Impressionism, Le Moulin de la Galette, Vincent van Gogh, 1886–1887

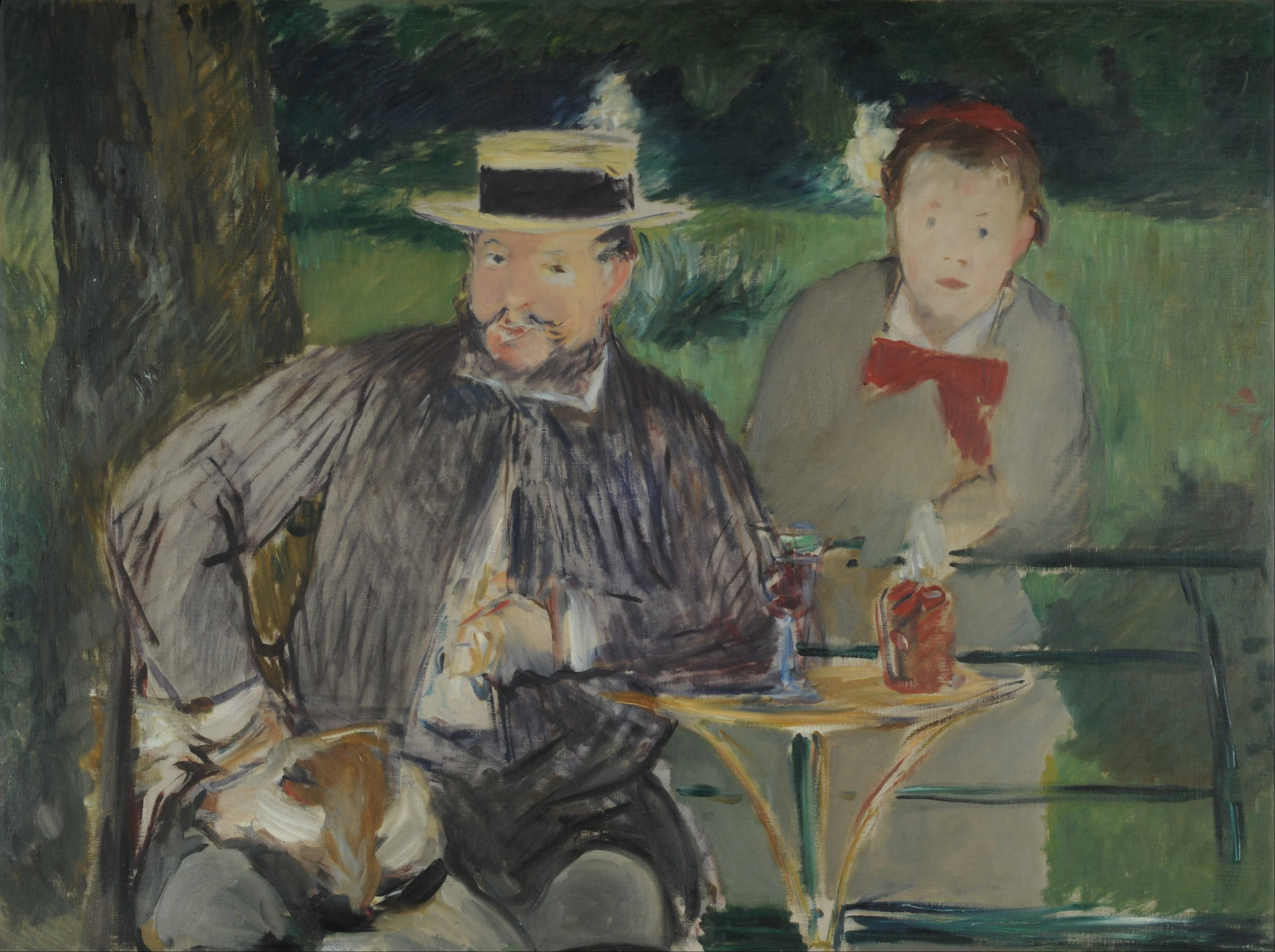
French Impressionism, Portrait of Ernest Hoschedé and his daughter Martha, Édouard Manet, 1876

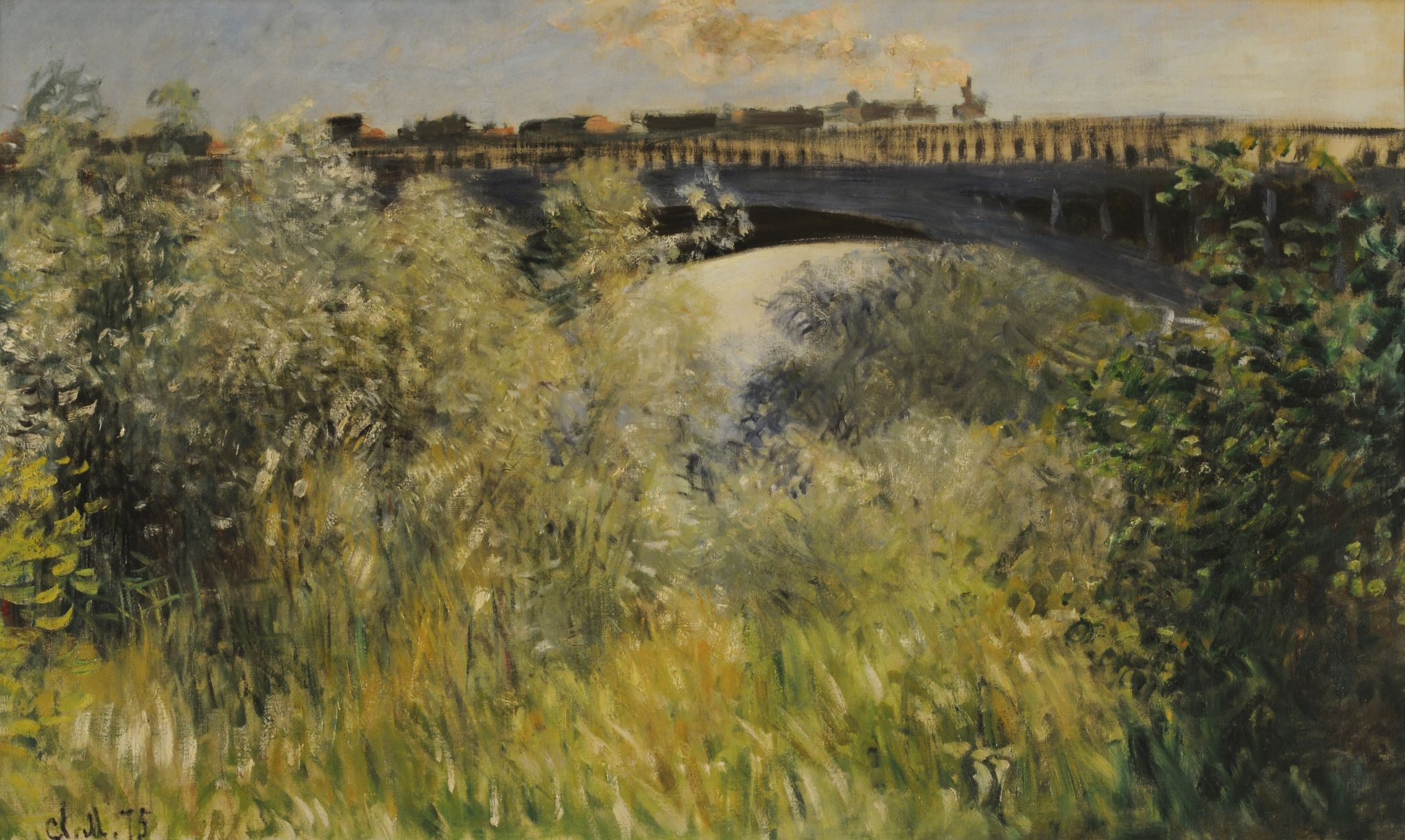
French Impressionism, The Bridge at Chatou, Claude Monet, 1875

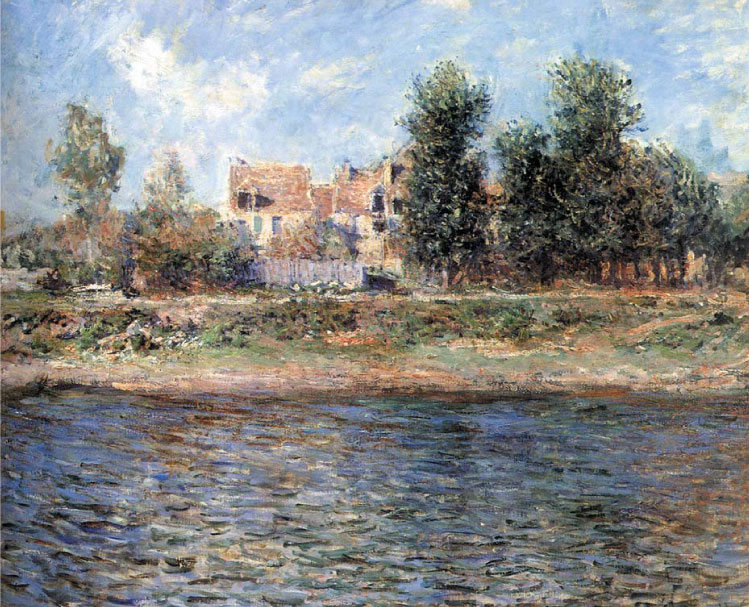
French Impressionism, The Banks of the Seine, Monet, 1880

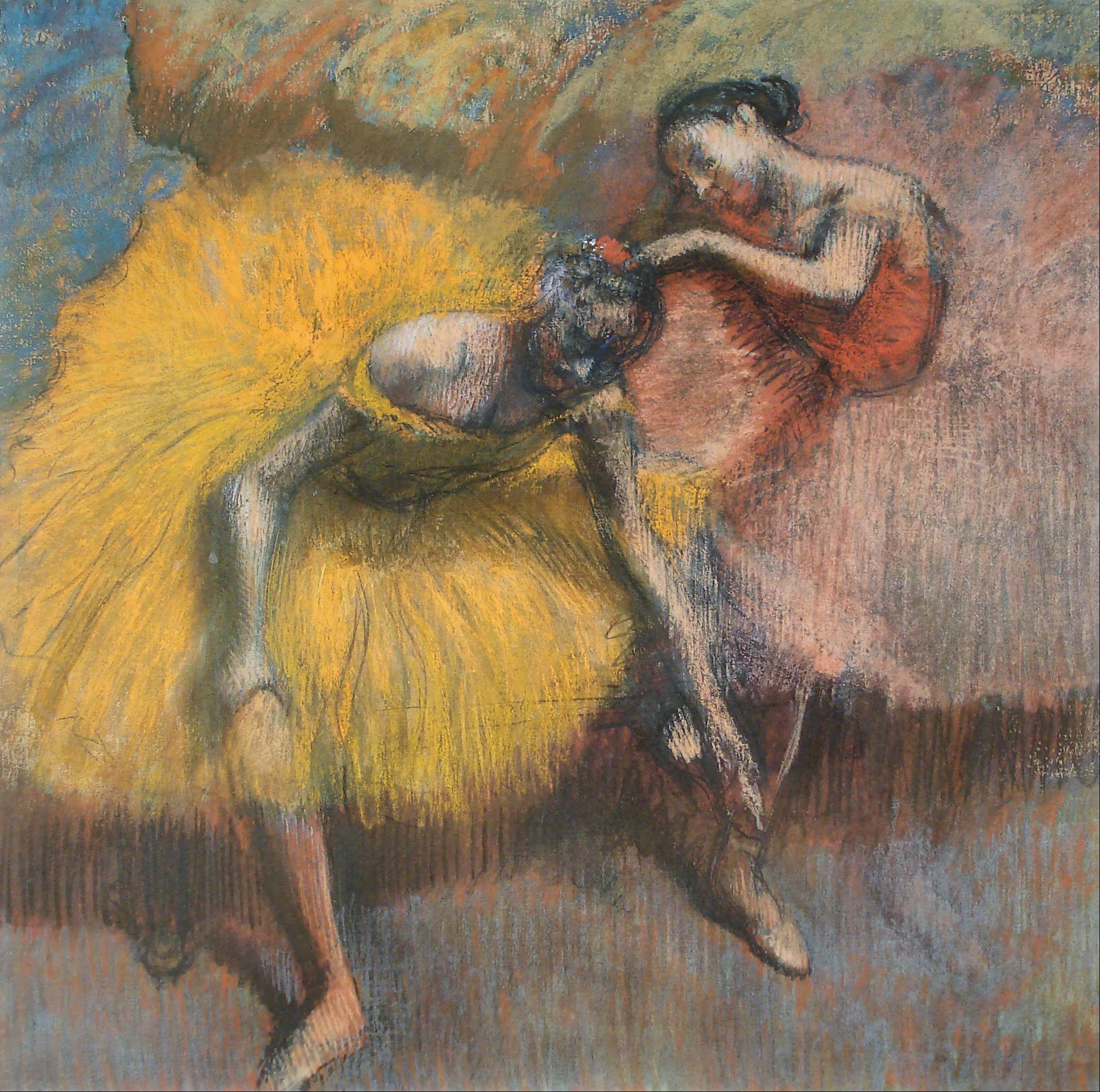
French Impressionism, Dancers and Two Yellow Roses, Edgar Degas, 1898

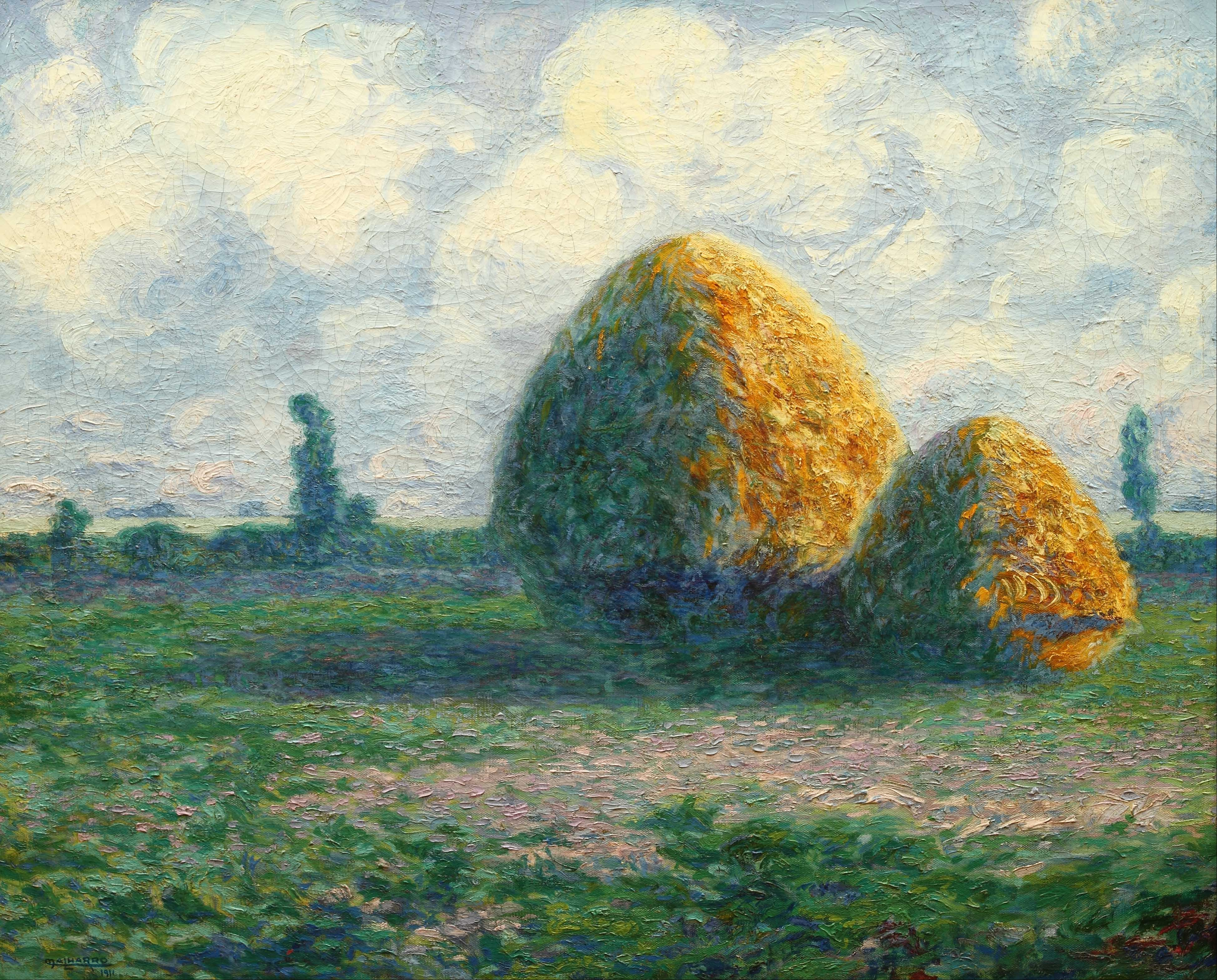
Argentine Impressionism, The Haystacks (The Pampa of Today), Martín Malharro, 1911

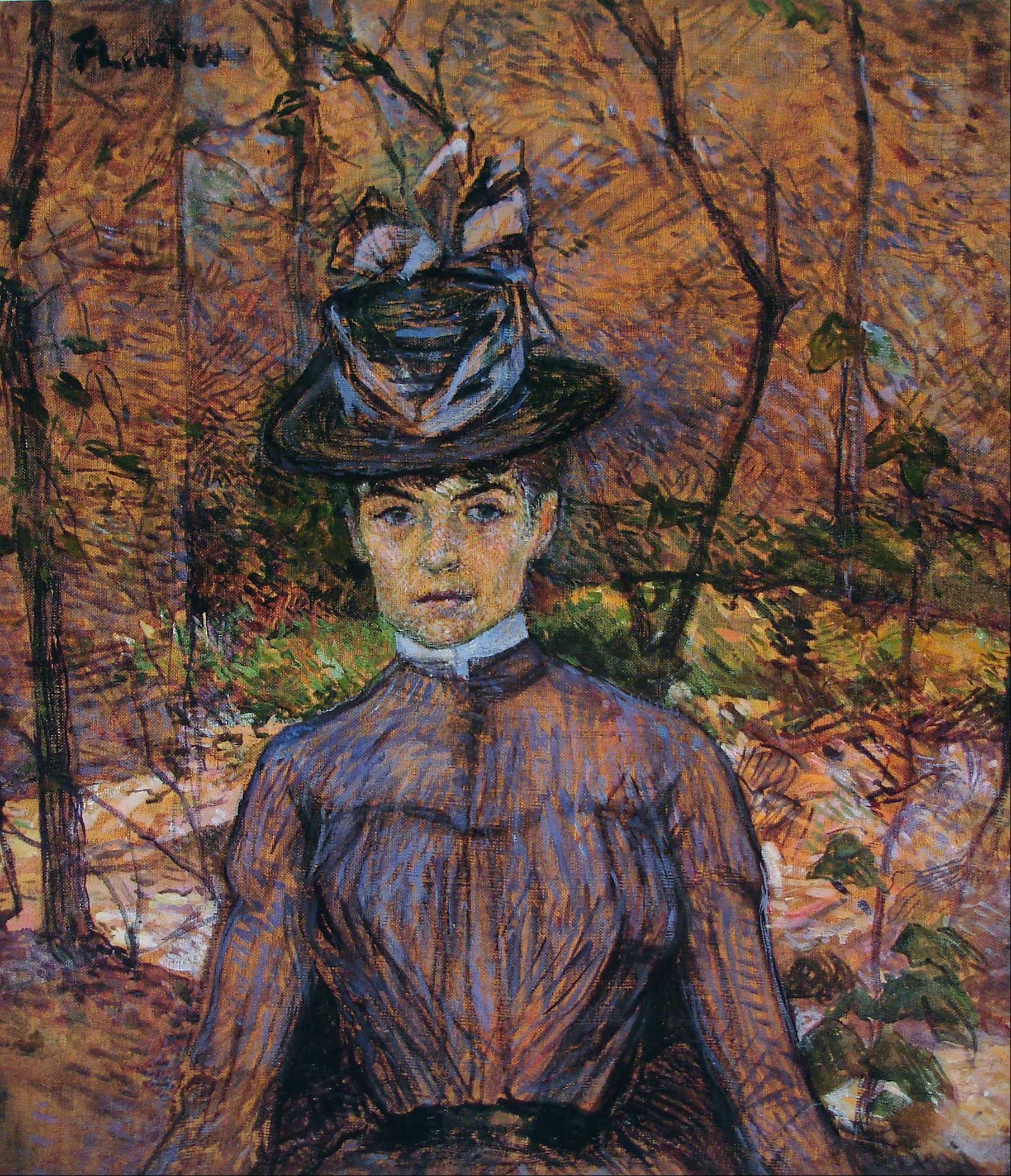
French Post-Impressionism, Portrait of Suzanne Valadon, Henri de Toulouse-Lautrec, 1885

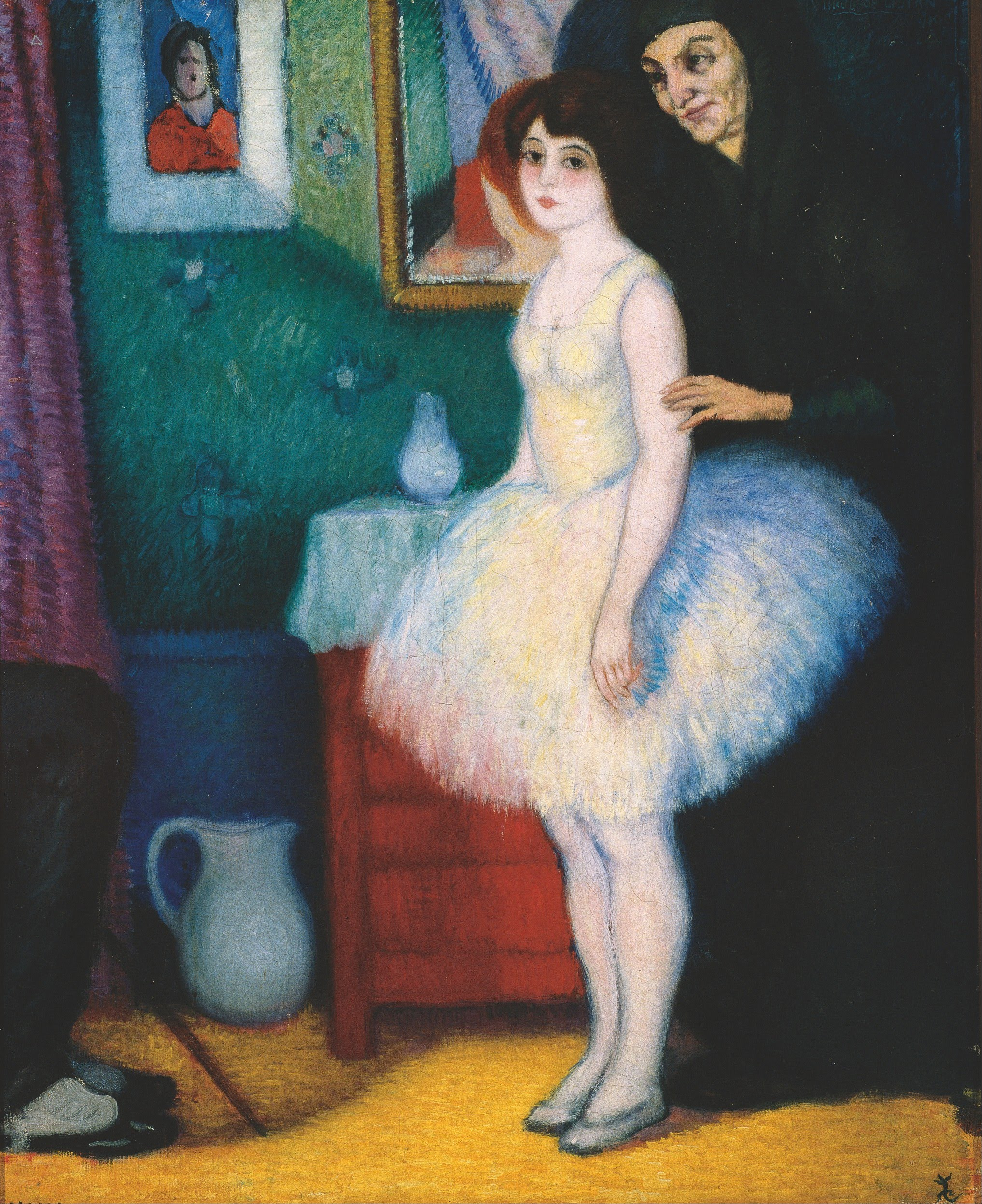
Argentine Post-Impressionism, The Presentation, Valentín Thibon de Libian, 1918

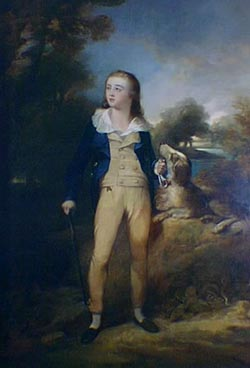
Scottish academic art, Master Cathcart and Dog, Henry Raeburn, 1810

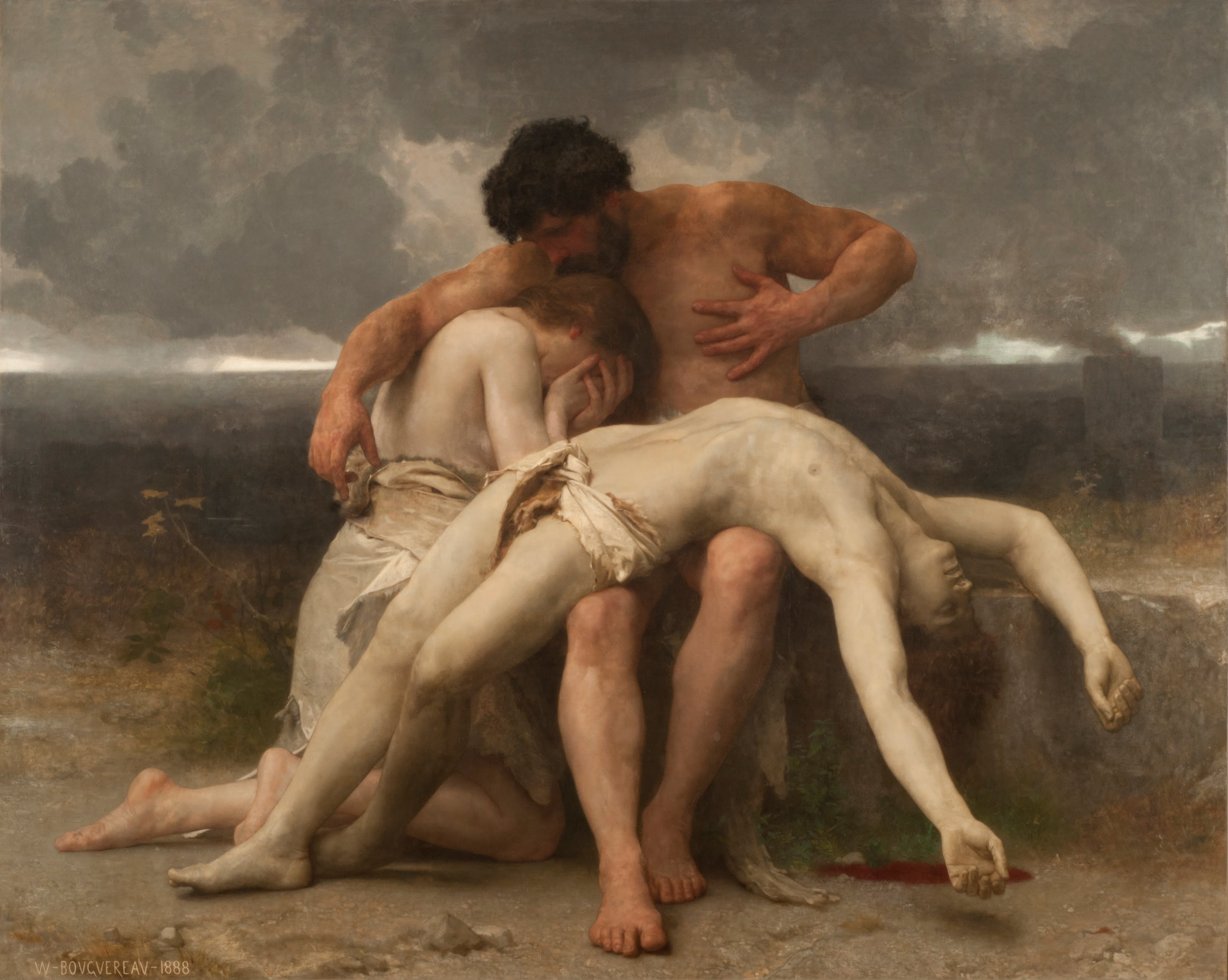
French academic art, The First Mourning, William-Adolphe Bouguereau, 1888

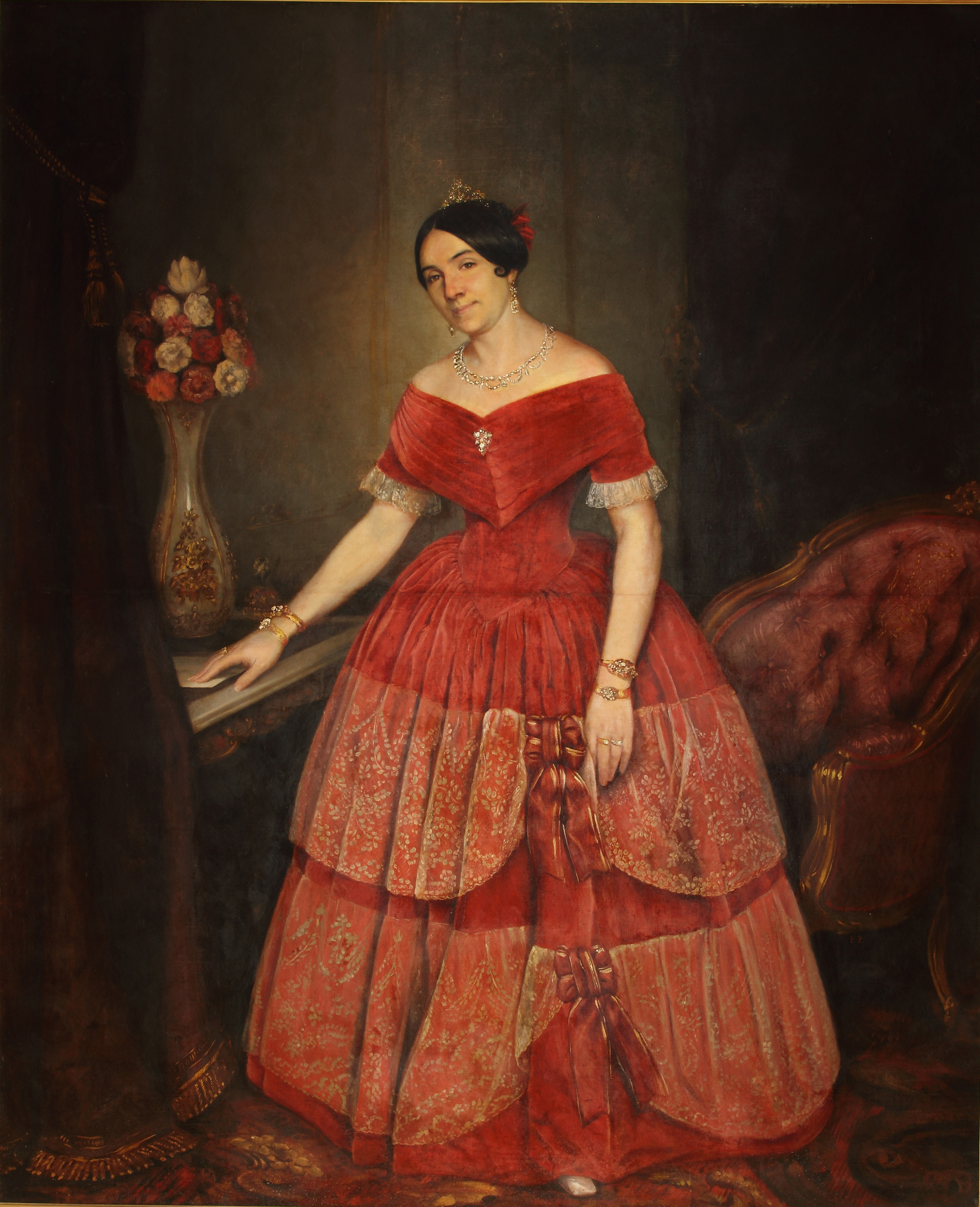
Argentine naturalism, Portrait of Manuelita Rosas, Prilidiano Pueyrredón, 1851

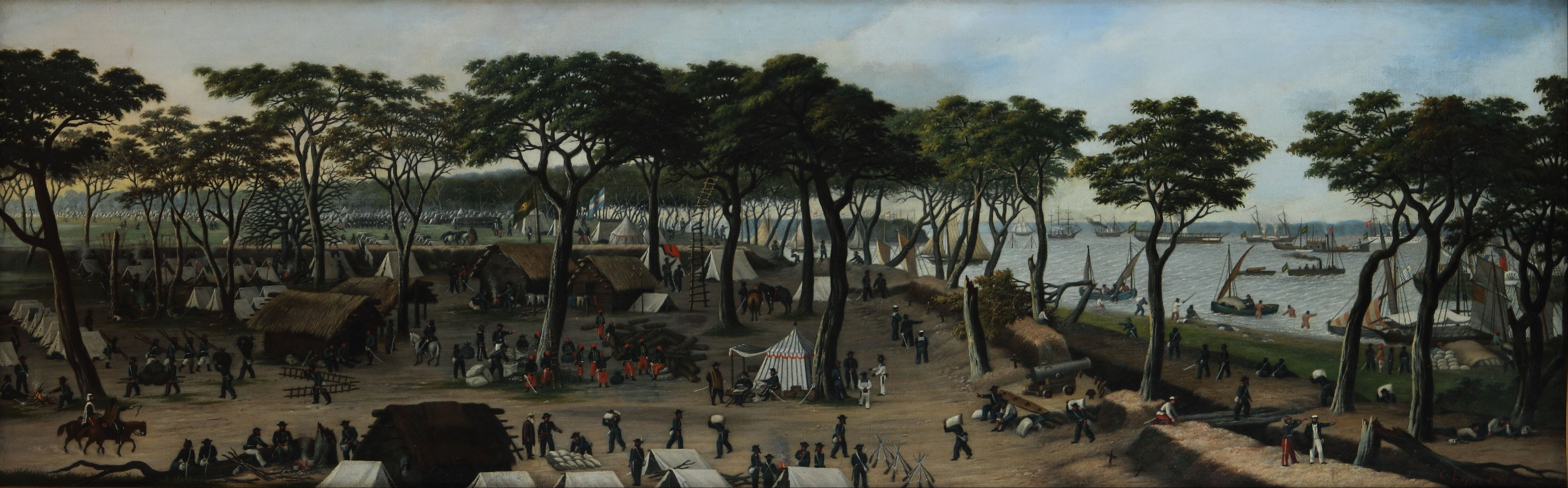
Argentine naturalism, Interior view of Curuzú looked upstream, Cándido López, 1891

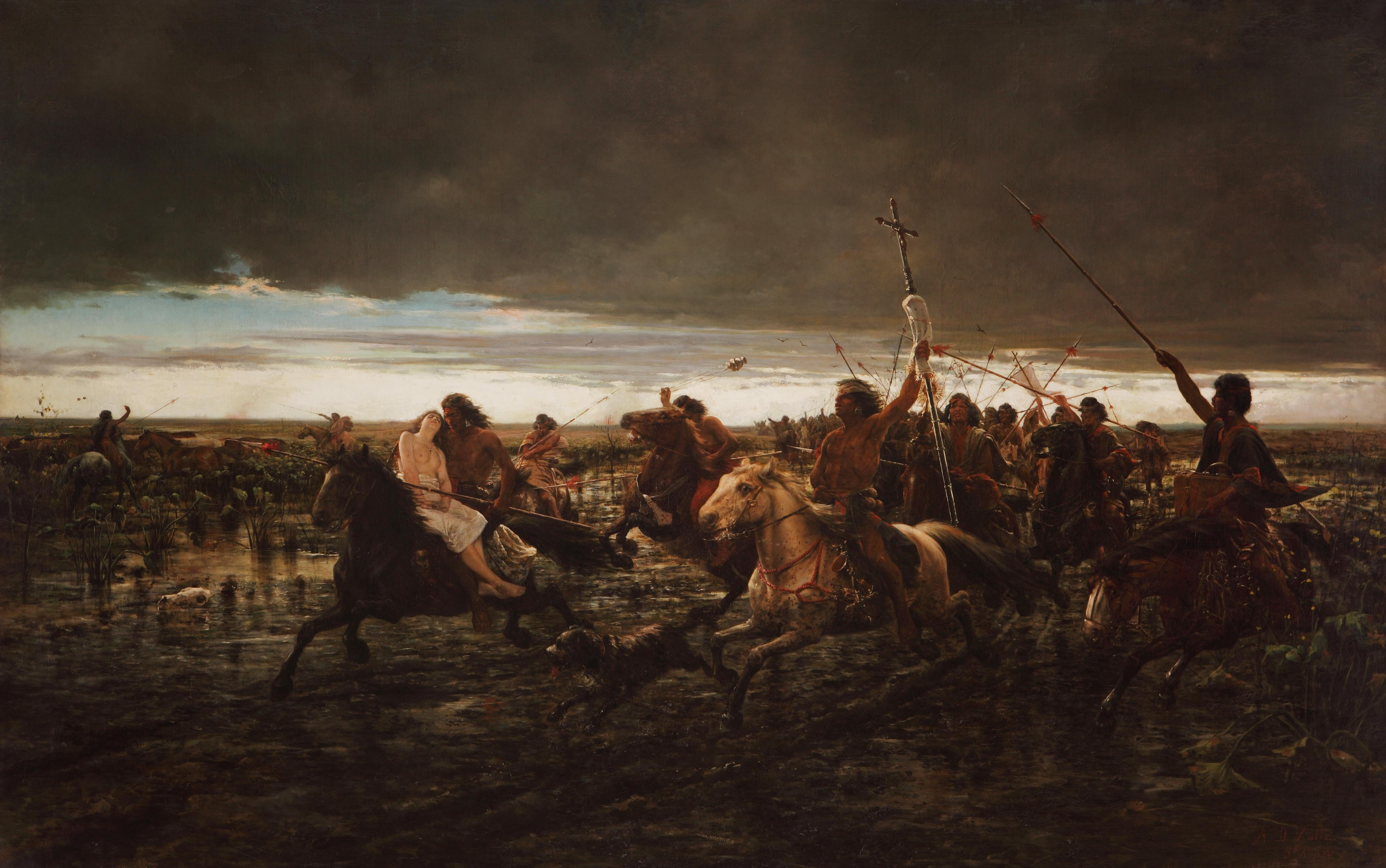
Argentine naturalism, The return of the malón, Ángel Della Valle, 1892

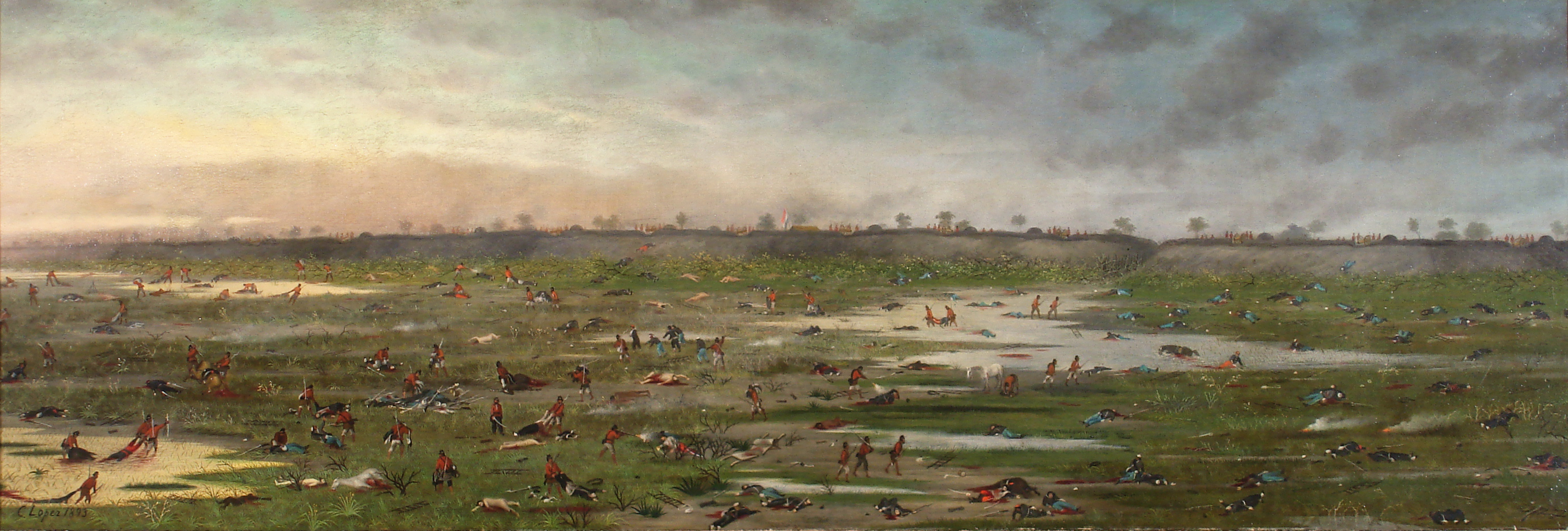
Argentine naturalism, After the Battle of Curupaytí, López, 1893

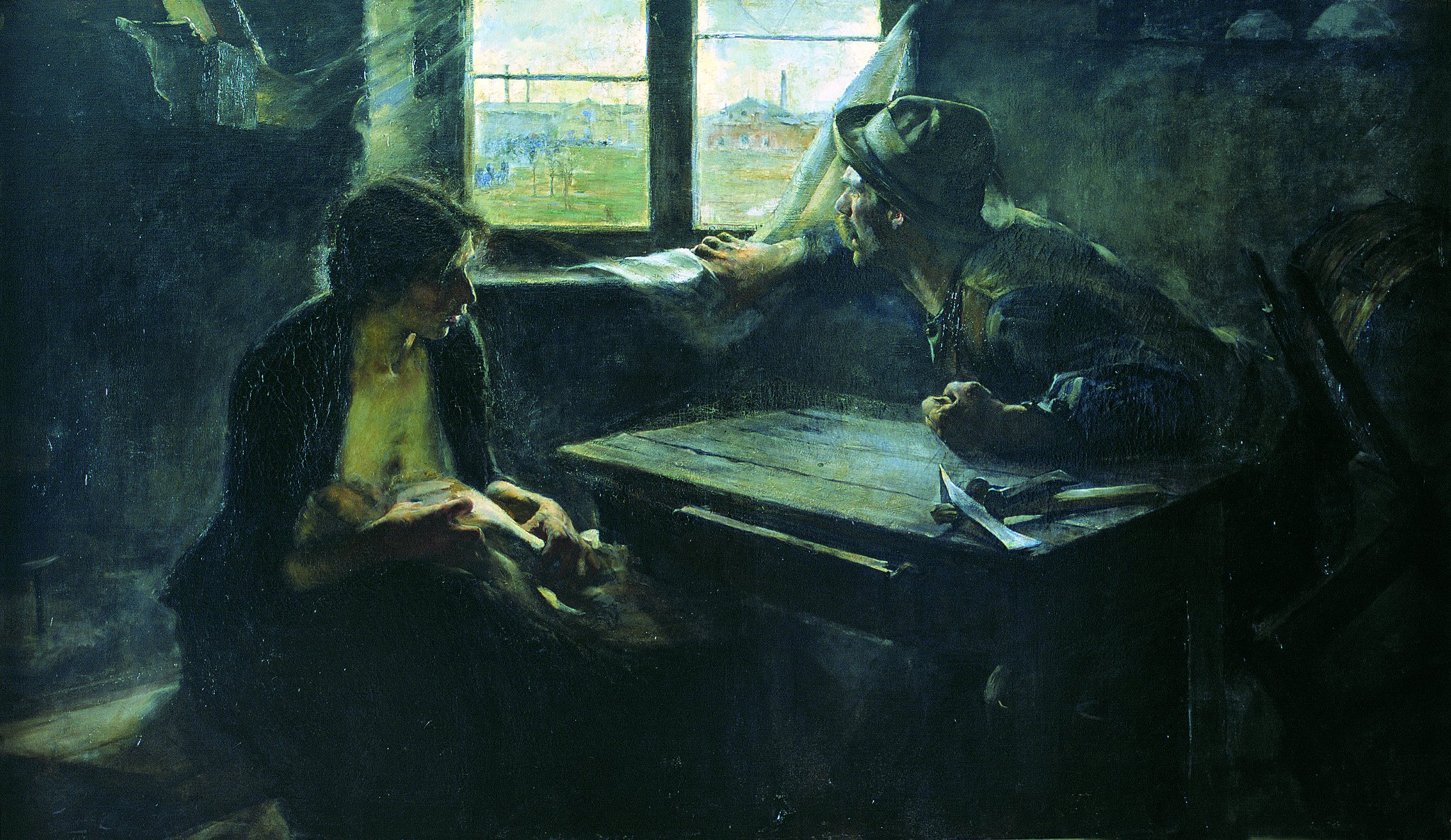
Argentine naturalism, Without bread and without work, Ernesto de la Cárcova, 1894

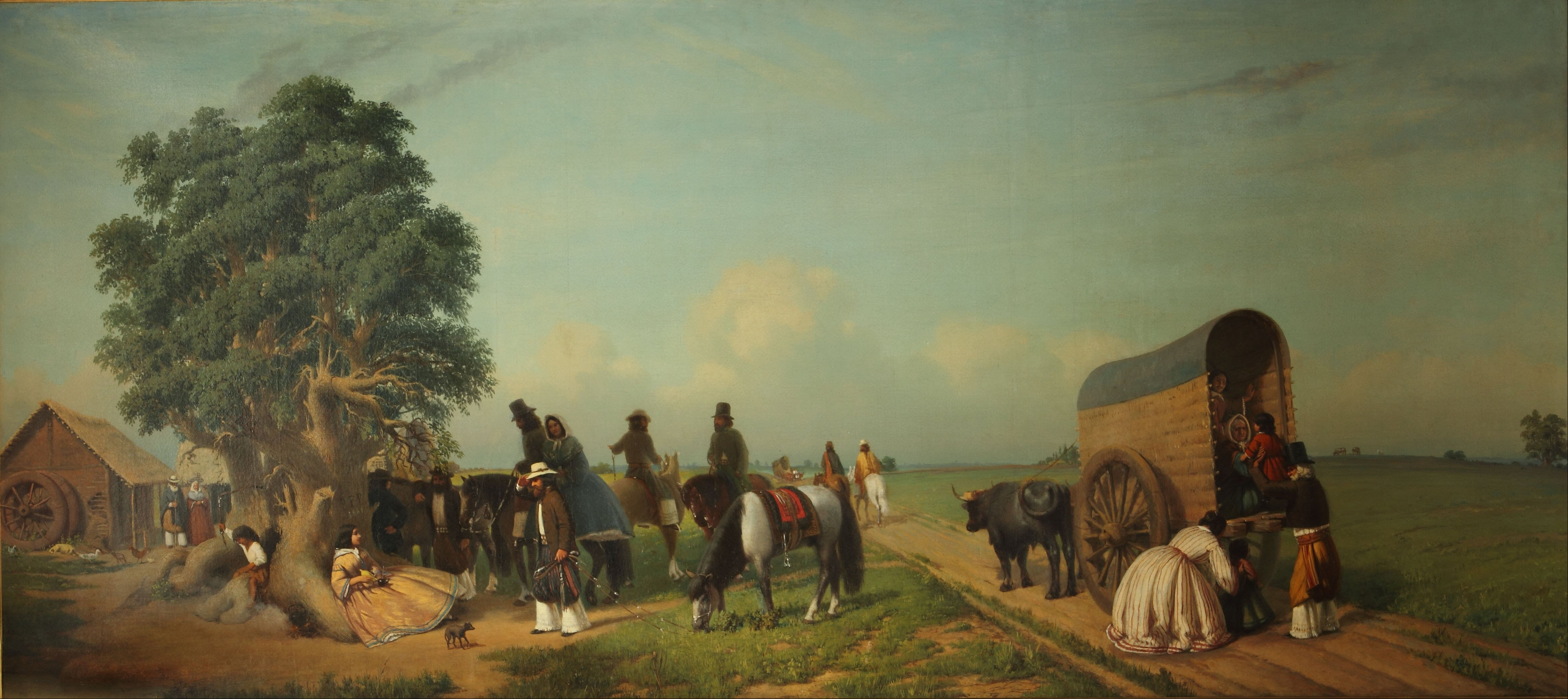
Argentine naturalism, A Stop in the Countryside, Prilidiano Pueyrredón, 1861

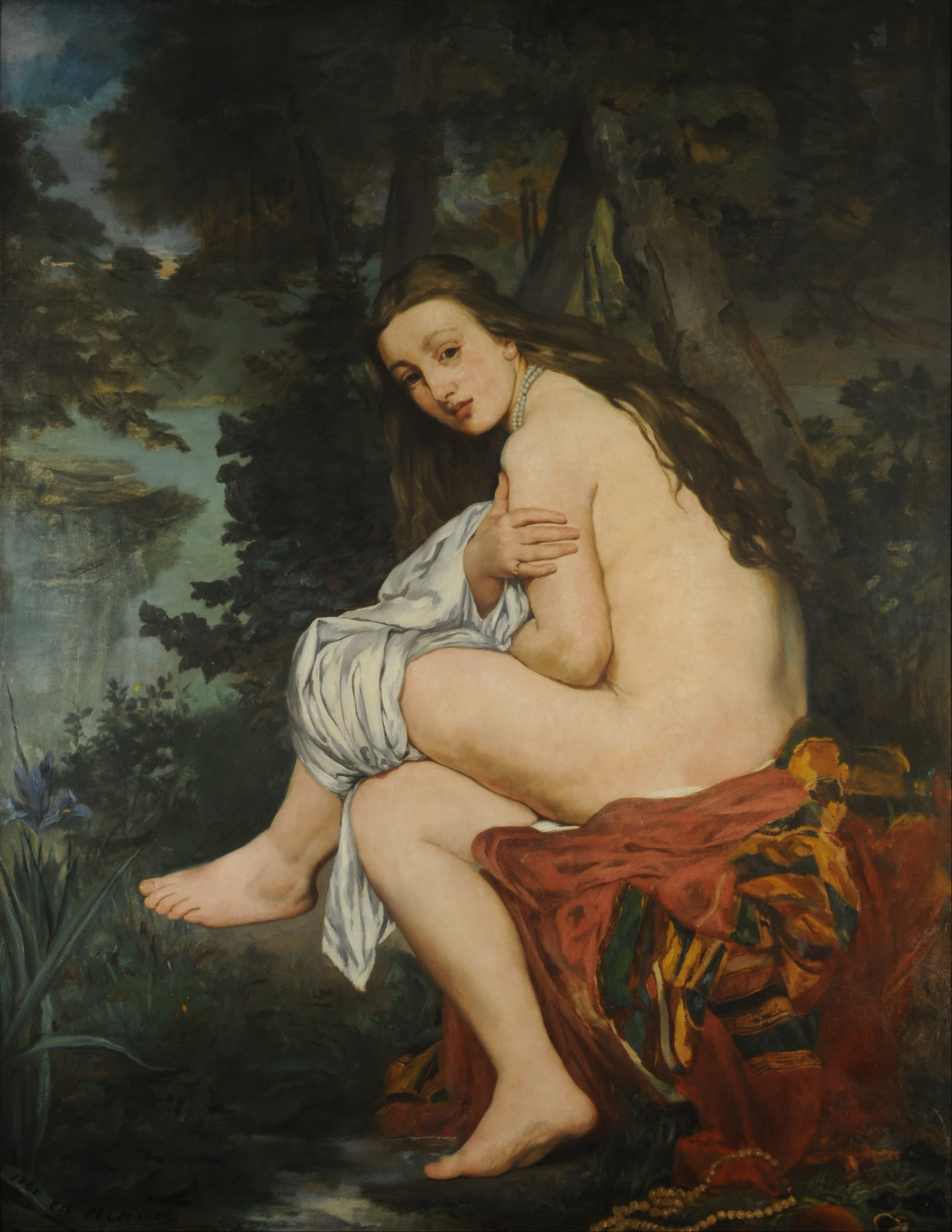
French naturalism, The Surprised Nymph, Édouard Manet, 1861

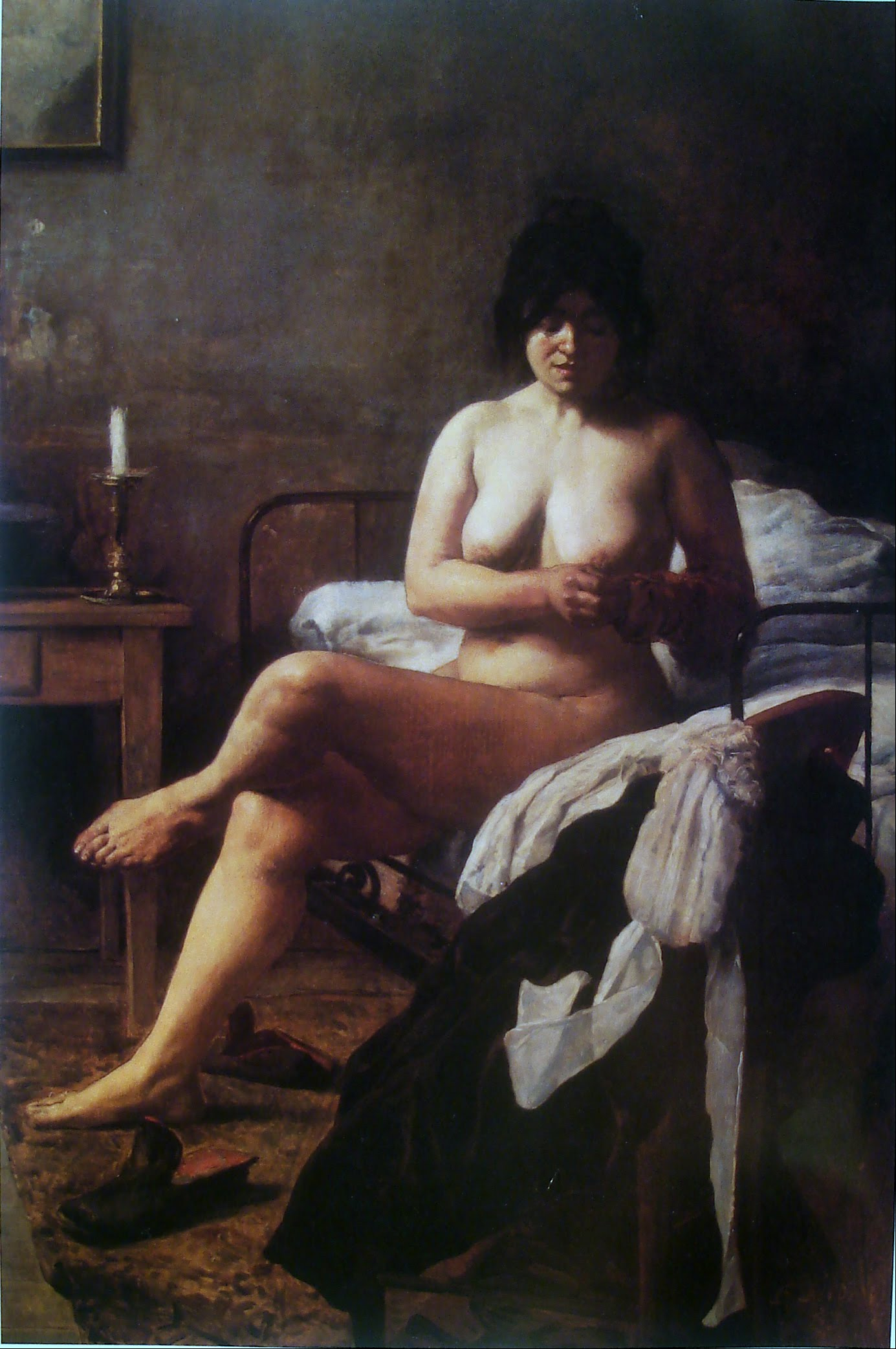
Argentine naturalism, The Maid's Awakening, Eduardo Sívori, 1887

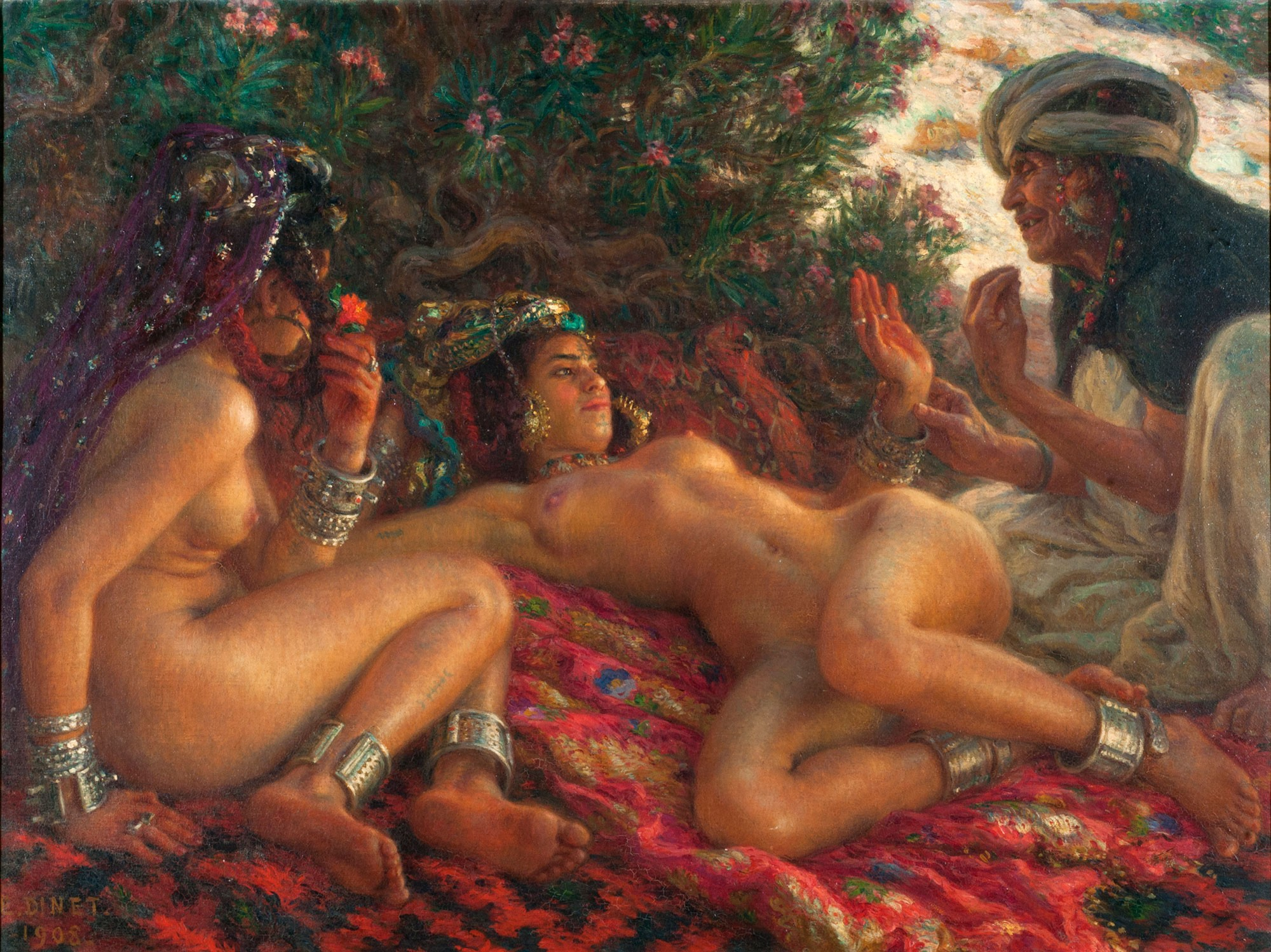
Orientalism, Satan's Messenger, Nasreddine Dinet, 1908

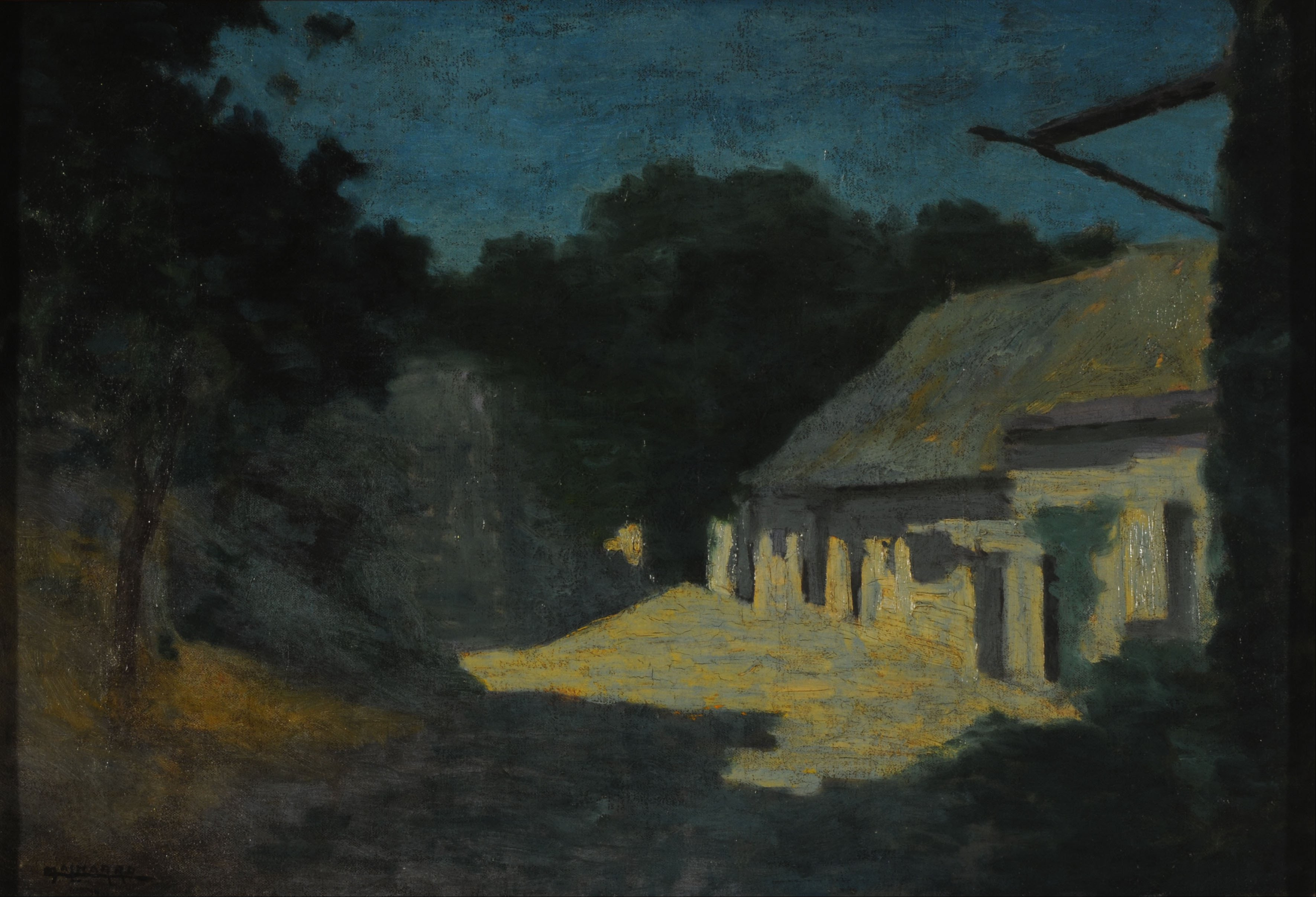
Argentine symbolism, Nocturnal, Martín Malharro, 1910

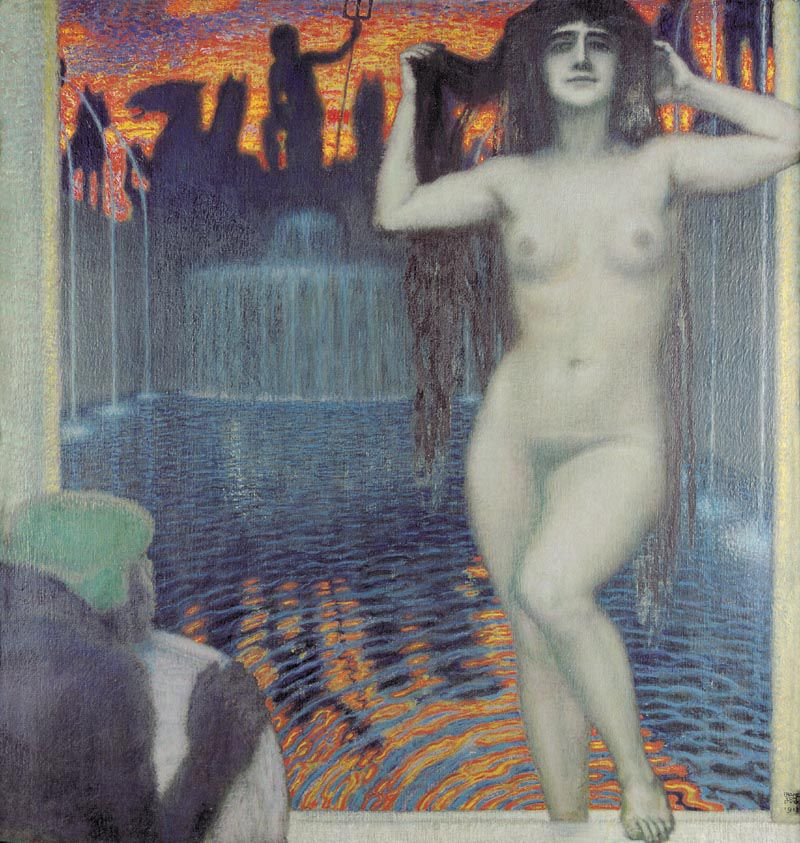
German symbolism, Batsheba, Franz von Stuck, 1912

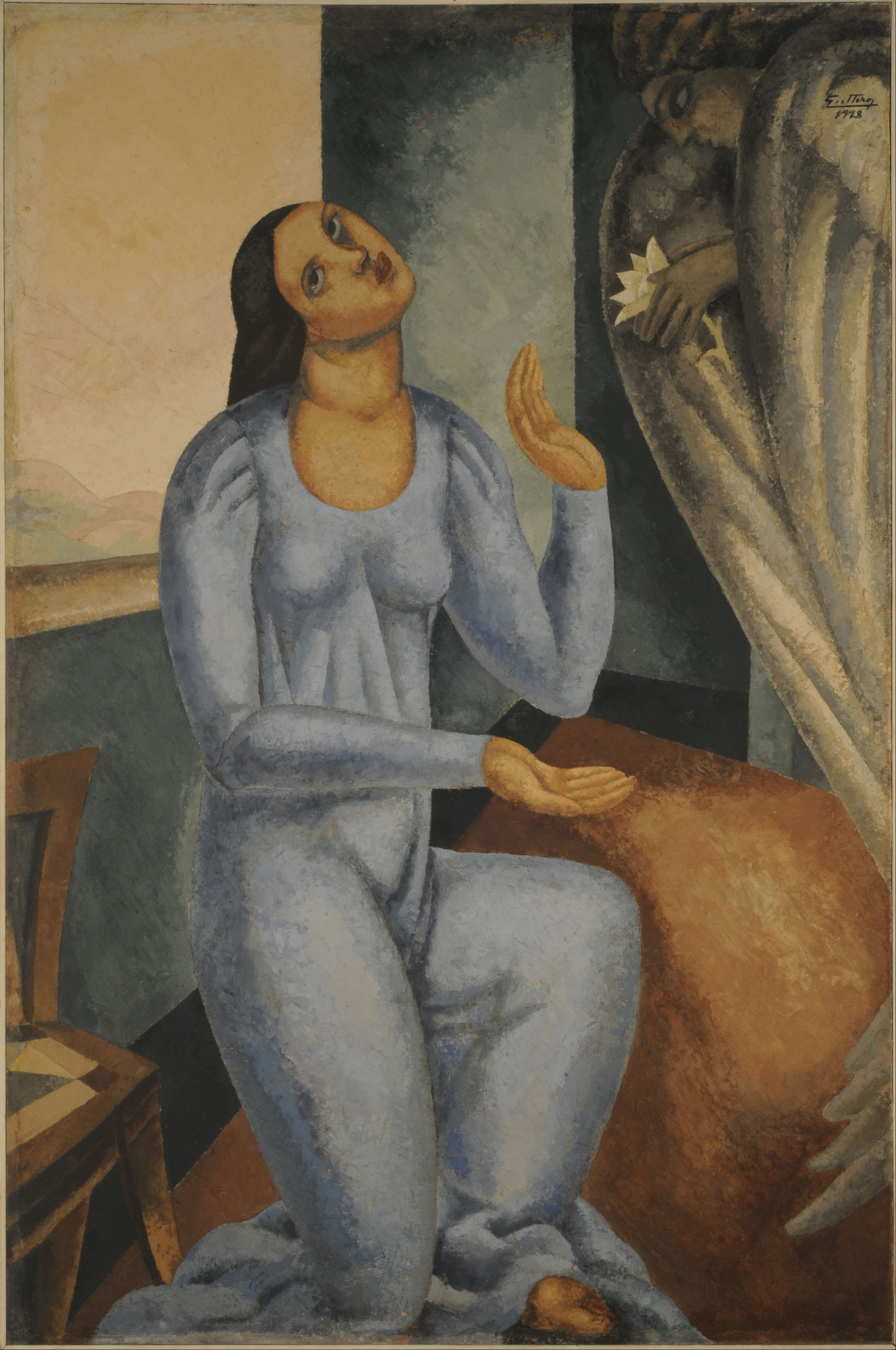
Argentine return to order, Annunciation, Alfredo Guttero, 1928
