= Alfredo Guttero =

Argentine Modernist painter and art promoter

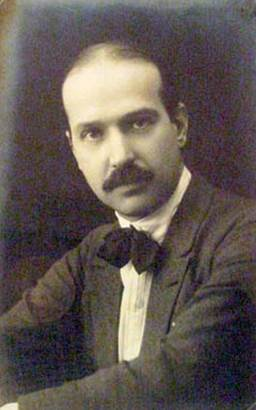
- Born: Alfredo Nicolás Guttero; 26 May 1882; Buenos Aires, Argentina
- Died: 1 December 1932 (aged 50); Buenos Aires, Argentina
- Known for: Painting, stage design
- Movement: Modernism

Alfredo Nicolás Guttero (26 May 1882, Buenos Aires – 1 December 1932, Buenos Aires) was an Argentine modernist painter and art promoter.

== Biography ==
He displayed creative talent at an early age, starting with music but later turned to art. Following his family's wishes, he began a legal career, but left it to become a painter, under the encouragement of Ernesto de la Cárcova and Martín Malharro. In 1904, he received a grant from the Argentinian government to study in Europe and lived in Paris until 1916, where he studied with Maurice Denis and participated in the Salon. Following that, he lived in Segovia and Madrid, with brief stays in Germany, Austria and Italy and visits to virtually every other part of Western Europe, ending with a major exhibition in Genoa.

After more than two decades away from home, he returned in 1927, where he remained intensely active during the five years remaining until his death. He became the Director of the "Plastic Arts" division of the local Wagner Society and created the "Hall of Modern Painters", where he introduced the works of Miguel Carlos Victorica and Demetrio Urruchúa, among others. Together with Raquel Forner, Alfredo Bigatti and Pedro Domínguez Neira (1894–1970), he created the Cursos Libres de Arte Plástico. In 1931, he exhibited at the First Baltimore Pan-American Exhibition of Contemporary Paintings at the Baltimore Museum of Art. Much of his time and energy was spent promoting modern art, in opposition to the reactionary forces prevalent at that period. His death came suddenly.

A large part of his work involves figures in unusual, kinetic poses, but he also painted landscapes with industrial buildings. His interest in music led him to provide decorations for the Teatro Colón. He also devised a painting technique he called "yeso cocido" (cooked plaster), consisting of plaster and pigments bound with glue and usually applied to wood.

== Gallery ==
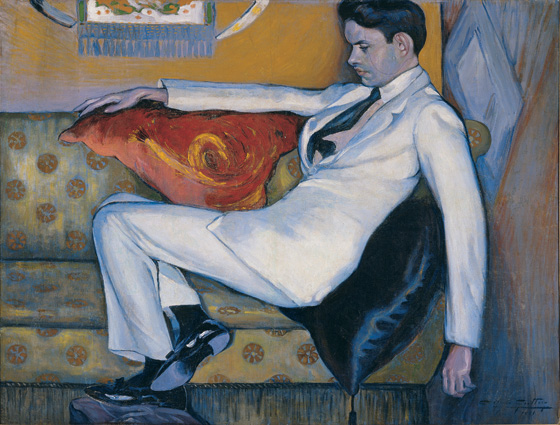
Retrato de Lucien de Cavarry (Portrait of Lucien de Cavarry), 1911, MALBA, Buenos Aires

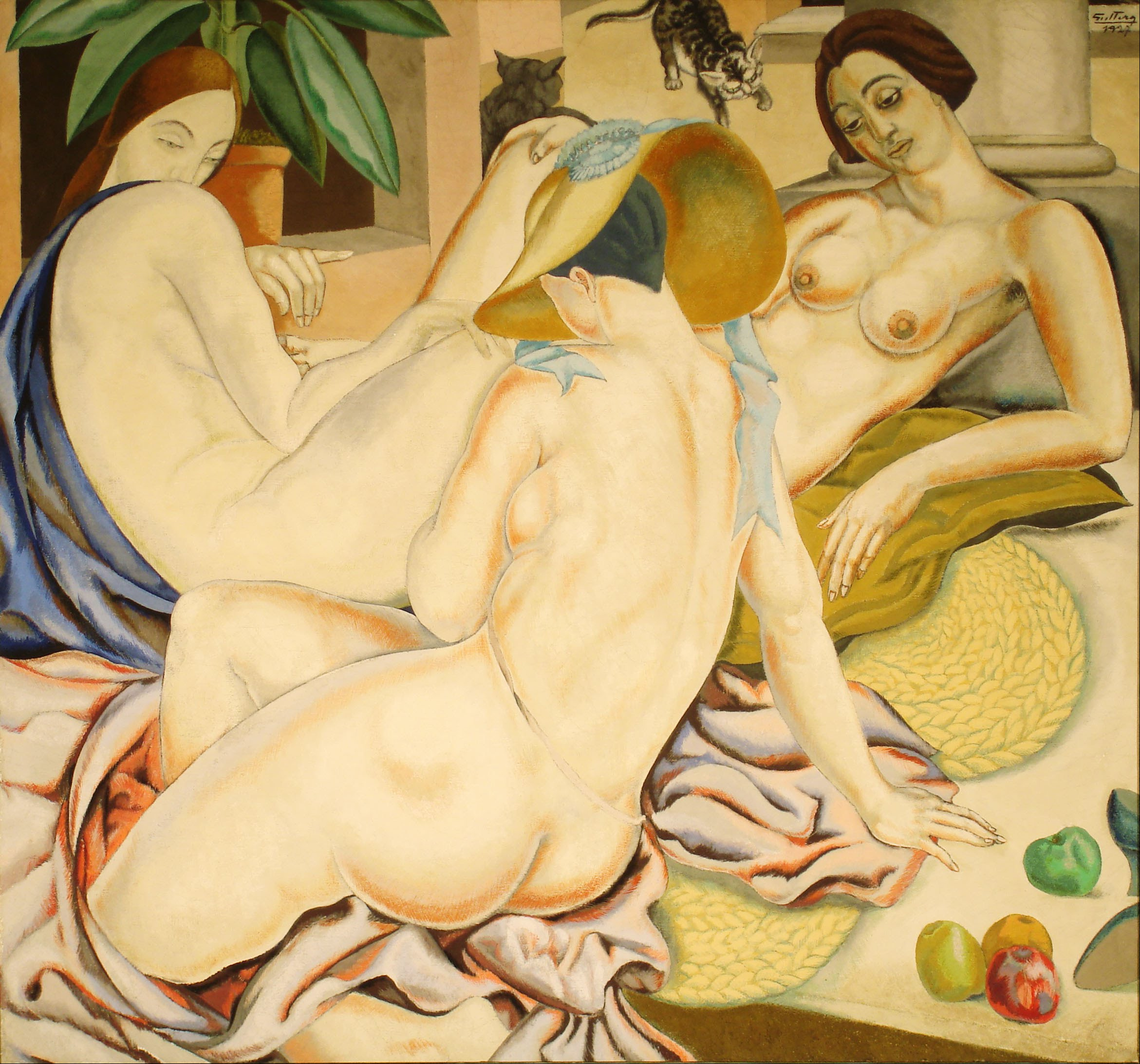
Mujeres indolentes (Indolent Women), 1927, Museo Nacional de Bellas Artes, Buenos Aires

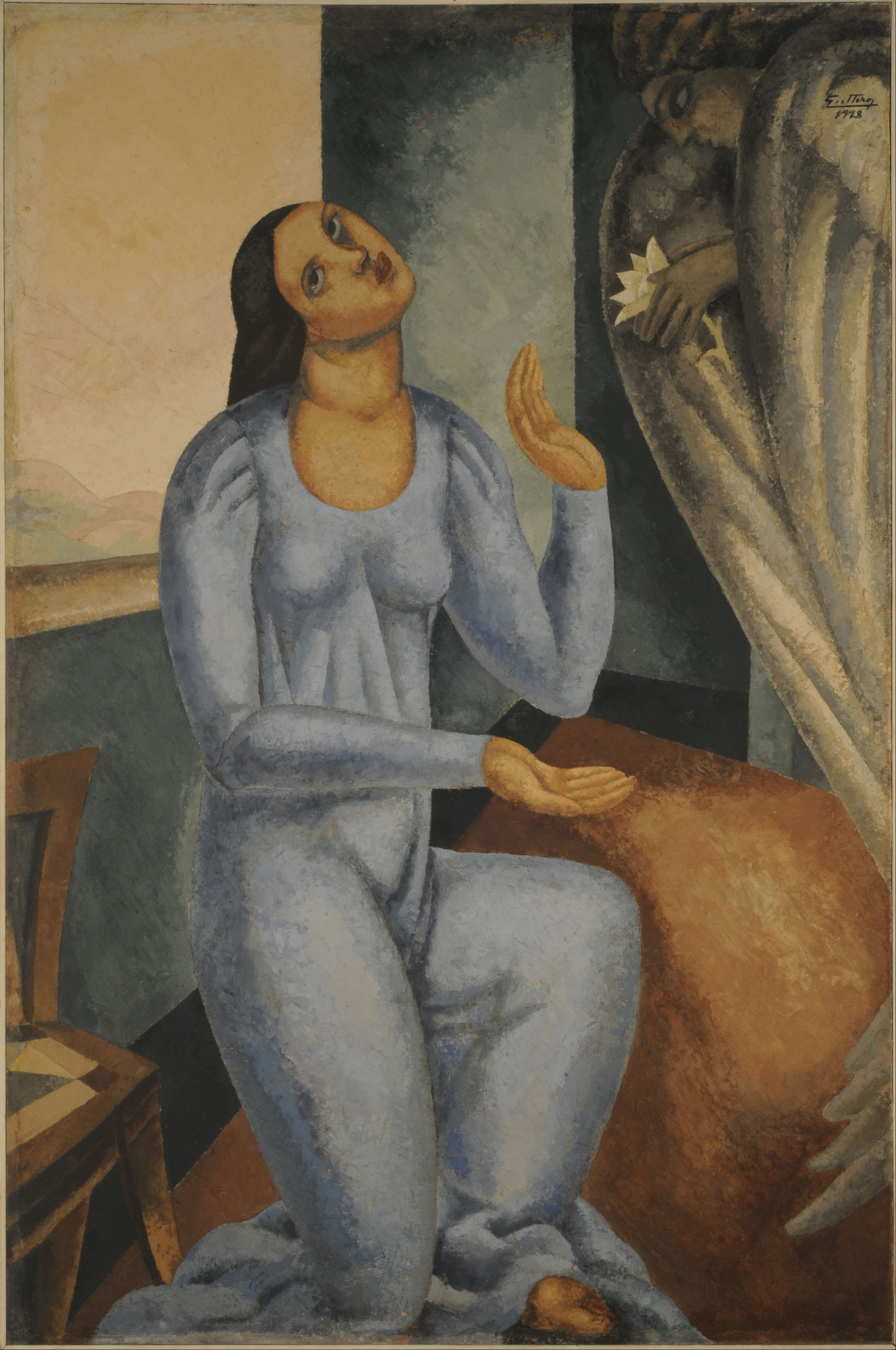
Anunciación (Annunciation), 1928, Museo Nacional de Bellas Artes, Buenos Aires

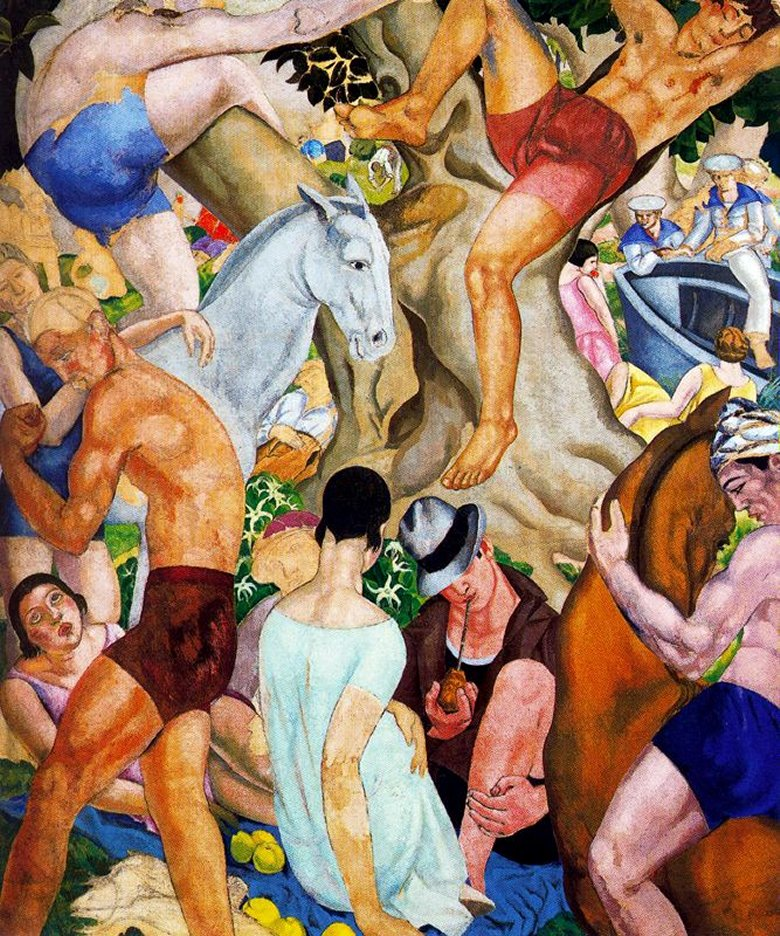
Composición (Composition), 1928, Private collection, Buenos Aires

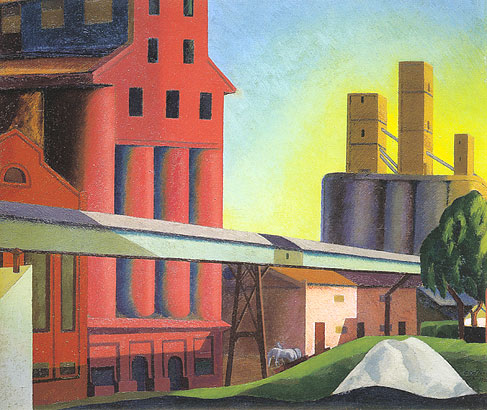
Elevadores de grano (Grain Elevators), 1928, Private collection

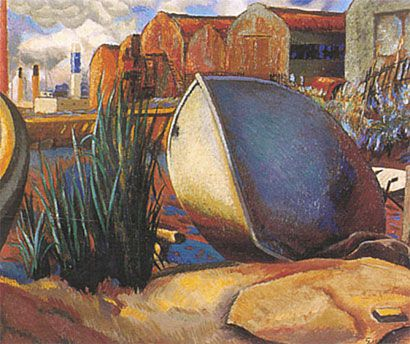
Barca en la ribera (Boat on the Riverbank), 1929, Ministerio de Relaciones Exteriores, Comercio Internacional y Culto, Buenos Aires

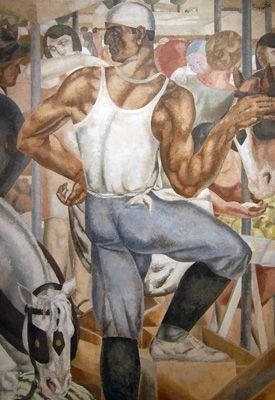
Feria (Market), 1929, Private collection

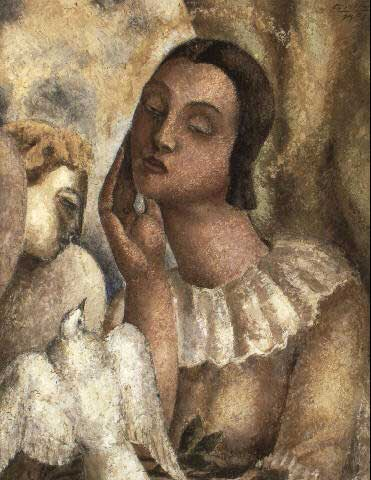
Anunciación con paloma (Annunciation with dove), 1931, MALBA, Buenos Aires
