= The First Mourning =

1888 painting by William-Adolphe Bouguereau

- Premier Deuil (French)
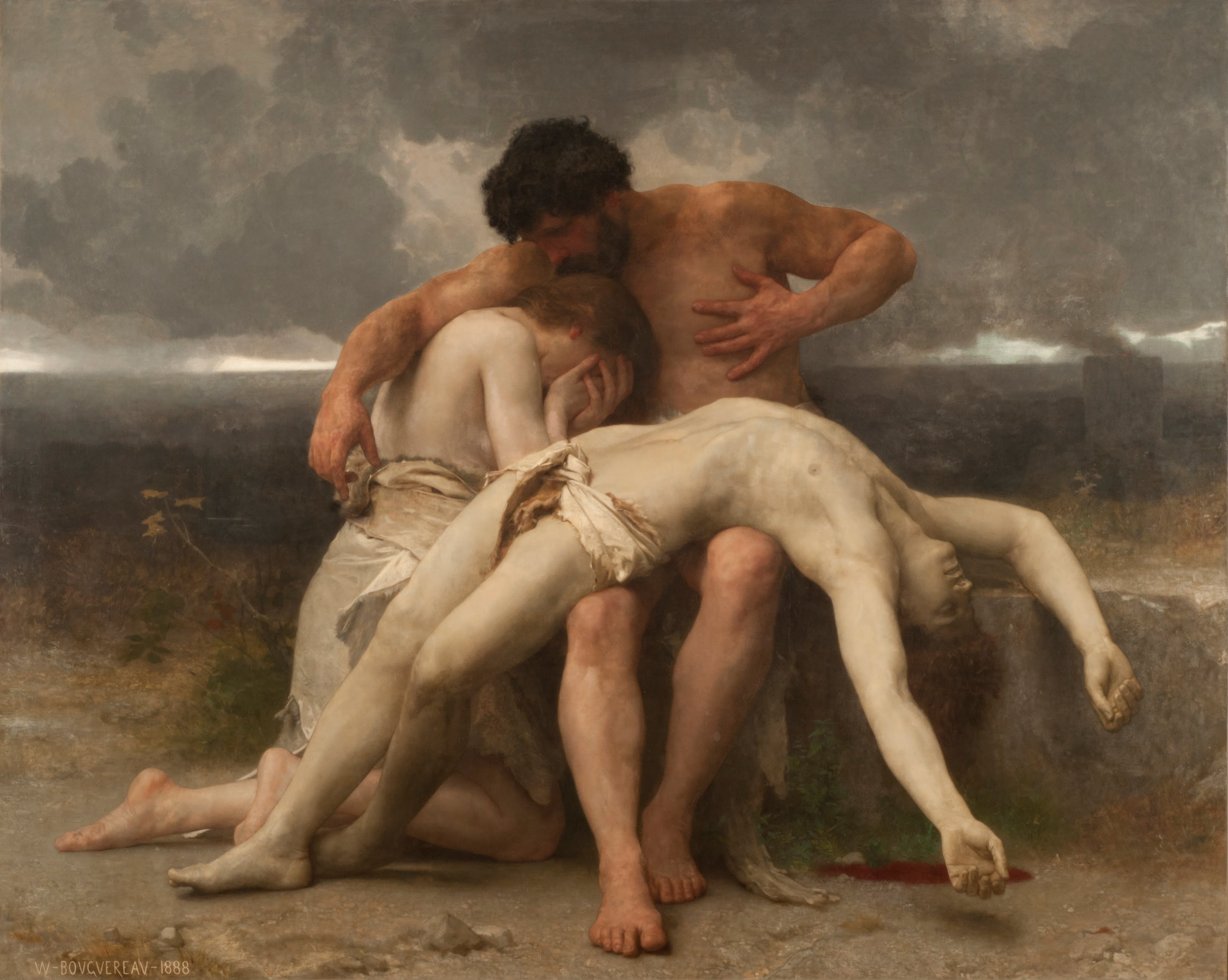
- Artist: William-Adolphe Bouguereau
- Year: 1888
- Medium: Oil on canvas
- Dimensions: 203 cm × 252 cm (80 in × 99 in)
- Location: Museo Nacional de Bellas Artes; Buenos Aires

The First Mourning (in French Premier Deuil) is an oil painting on canvas created in 1888 by the French academic painter William-Adolphe Bouguereau. Its dimensions are 203 by 252 centimetres (80 in × 99 in). It is in the Museo Nacional de Bellas Artes in Buenos Aires, Argentina.

This work depicts the moment after Adam and Eve just found the body of their son Abel, who was murdered by Cain. This is the first human death recorded in the Bible.

Bouguereau had suffered the loss of his second son shortly before painting this work.

Its original name is "Premier Deuil", in French, of which "The First Mourning" is a literal translation.
