= Satan's Messenger =

Painting by Étienne Alphonse Dinet

La Messagère de Satan
- Satan's Messenger (English)
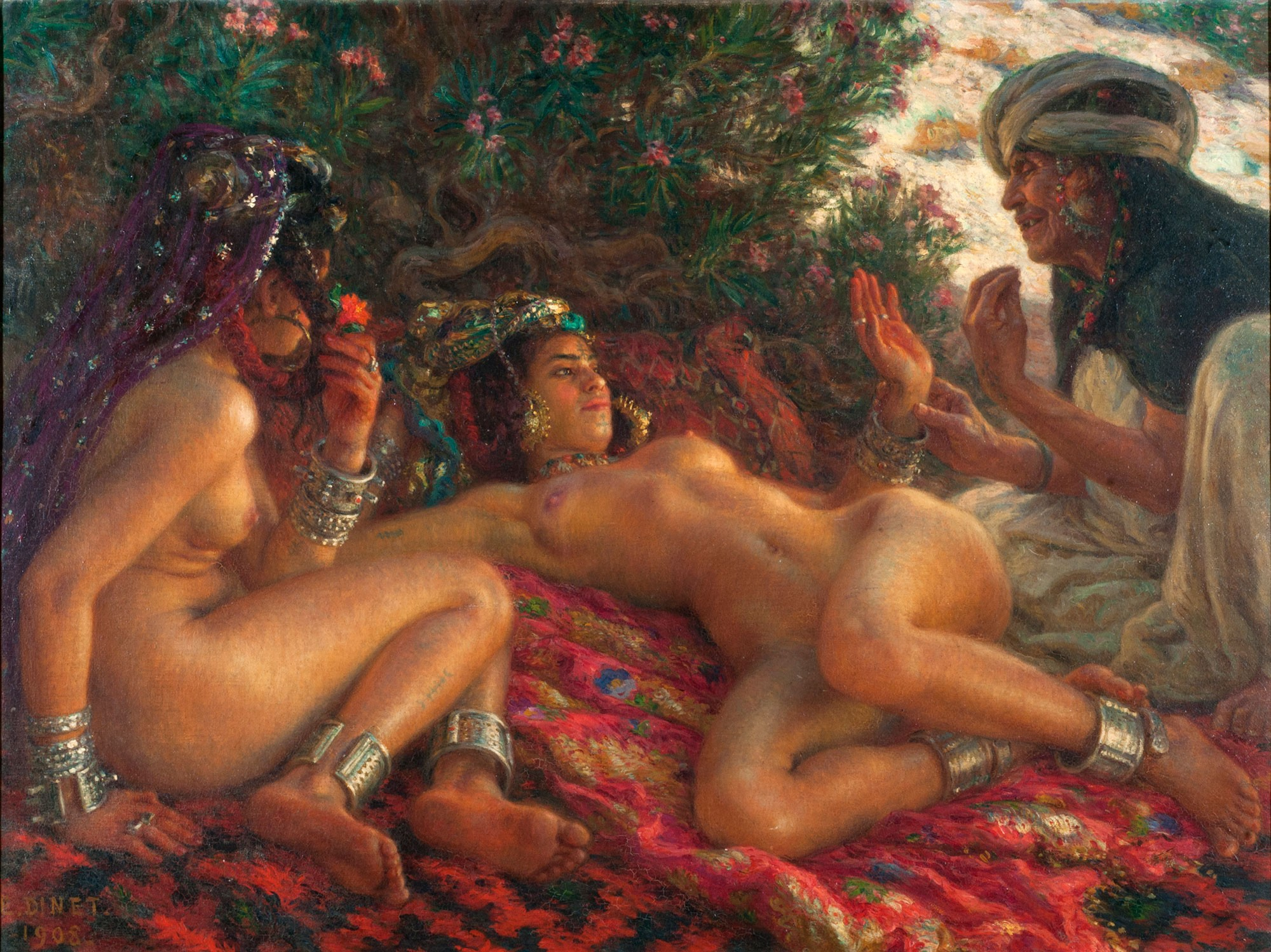
- Artist: Nasreddine Dinet
- Year: 1908
- Medium: Oil-on-canvas
- Dimensions: 112 cm × 148 cm (44 in × 58 in)
- Location: Museo Nacional de Bellas Artes, Buenos Aires

Satan's Messenger (French: La Messagère de Satan) is a genre painting created in 1908, by the French artist Nasreddine Dinet.

== Description ==
Satan's Messenger, or Mersoulet Iblis, is an oil painting by Nasreddine Dinet, created in Algeria in 1908.

Satan's Messenger was presented in 1909 at the exhibition of the Société Nationale des Beaux-Arts. The painting has been held at the National Museum of Fine Arts in Buenos Aires since 1911, following its donation to the museum by Carlos Madariaga and Josefa Anchorena de Madariaga.

In 1931, the painting was exhibited at the International Colonial Exhibition held in Paris.

== See also ==
- Orientalism
- Iblis
