= Martín Malharro =

Argentine painter

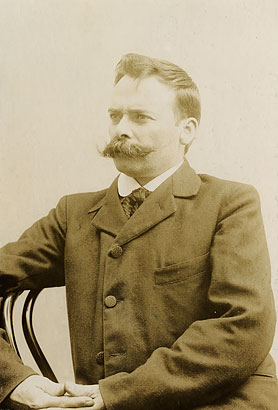
Martín Malharro

Martín Malharro (1865–1911) was an Argentine painter who introduced Impressionism in the country in the early 20th century.

== Life and work ==
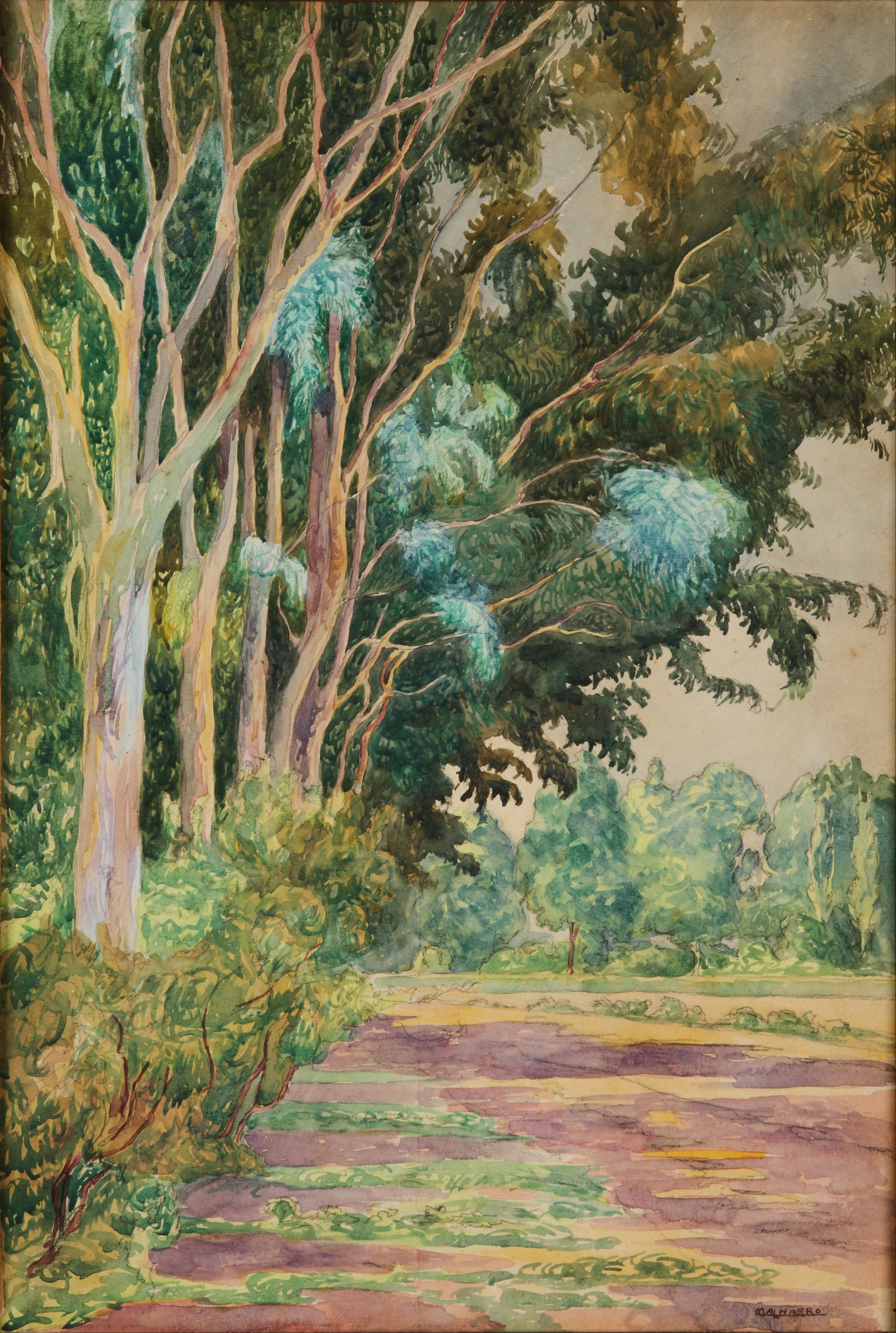
Landscape

Martín Malharro was born in the central Buenos Aires Province city of Azul in 1865. His childhood interest in painting led to domestic violence at home, from which he left for Buenos Aires in 1879. The struggling young artist was mentored in 1885 by publisher Roberto Payró, who encouraged him to enroll at the Society for the Stimulus of Fine Arts, where he received formal training by Francisco Romero, an Italian Argentine Realist painter, and others prominent in the genre locally, such as Ángel Della Valle and Reinaldo Giudici. Malharro was invited to the Córdoba Province ranch of José María Ramos Mejía in 1887, where, as an artist-in-residence, he gained experience as a landscape artist.

An 1892 excursion into Tierra del Fuego Territory introduced him to lithographer Antonio Bosco, who trained Malharro in an art which proved to be the young artist's first reliable source of income. His presentation at the Second National Atheneum in 1894, which consisted mainly of landscapes, particularly wheat fields, was well received by critics. This relative success allowed him to travel to Paris in 1895, where he befriended Realist sculptor and fellow Argentine Rogelio Yrurtia.

Malharro also drew on his experience at the Ramos Mejía ranch to refine his skill as a landscape impressionist, drawing influences from Camille Pissarro, Claude Monet and the Naturalist Barbizon School.

== Career ==
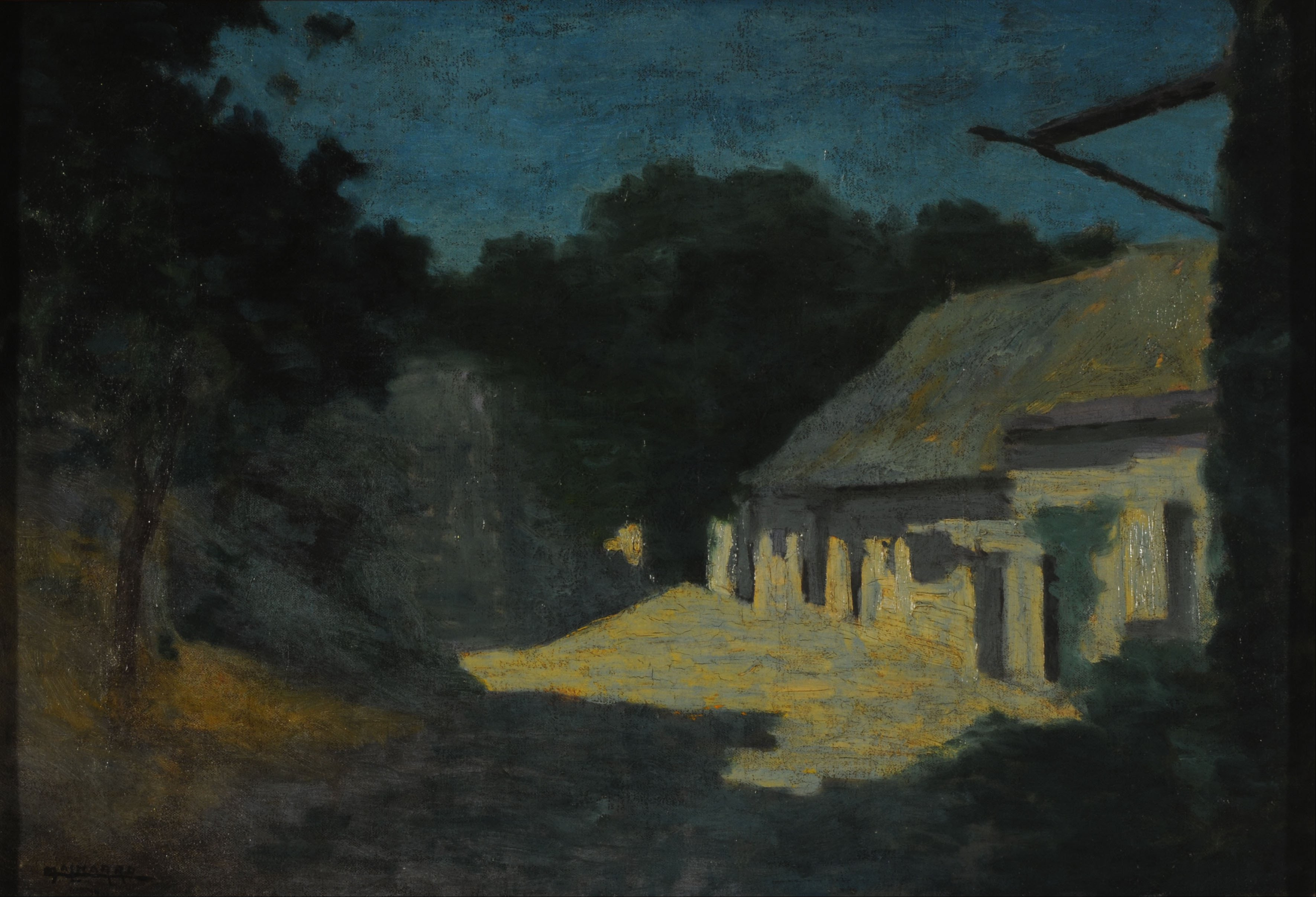
Nocturne, oil on canvas.

Returning to Buenos Aires in 1901, he secured an exhibition at the Witcomb Gallery in the following year. Conservative Argentine audiences, who still preferred Realist work, were won over by the 1902 art show, which popularized Impressionism in the then-remote South American nation. His nocturnal scenes became particularly coveted by buyers and lauded by critics. Malharro's work took an increasingly Symbolist direction and away from earlier studies on wheat fields, a common subject among Impressionist artists in Argentina at the time. Malharro, Fernando Fader, Cesáreo Bernaldo de Quirós and other artists following the same trend became the first prominent Post-Impressionists in Argentina, where they were known as the Nexus group.

The sudden renown secured Malharro a post in the prestigious University of La Plata as Dean of the School of Art, as well as in the National Fine Arts Academy. His atelier in the northside Buenos Aires district of Belgrano became increasingly sought-after, though a second exhibition in 1908 drew scorn from Argentine critics, who still rejected most work associated with the Nexus group. Malharro died in Buenos Aires on August 17, 1911, at age 46.

== Gallery ==
Martín Malharro's works

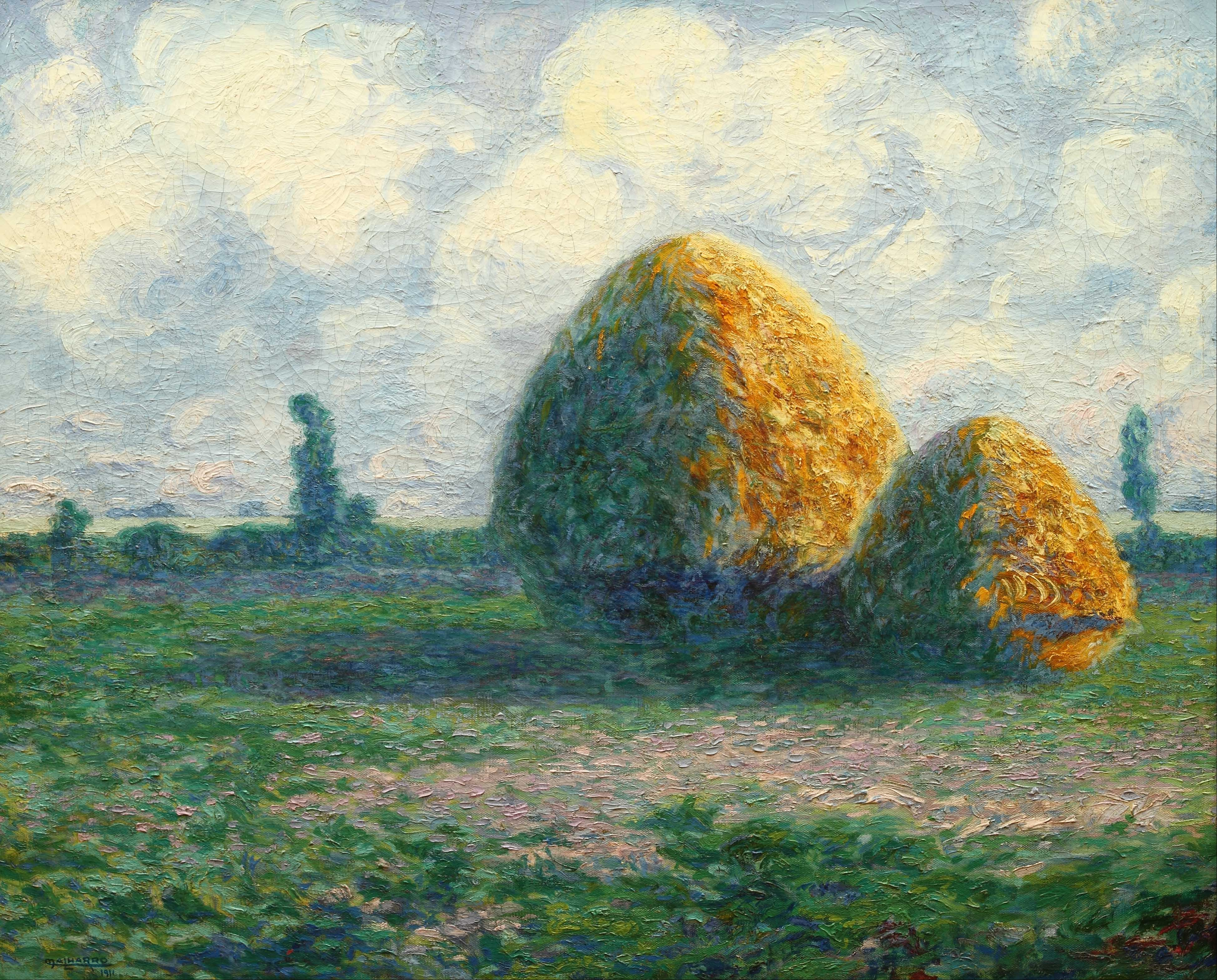
Hay, oil on canvas, 1911.

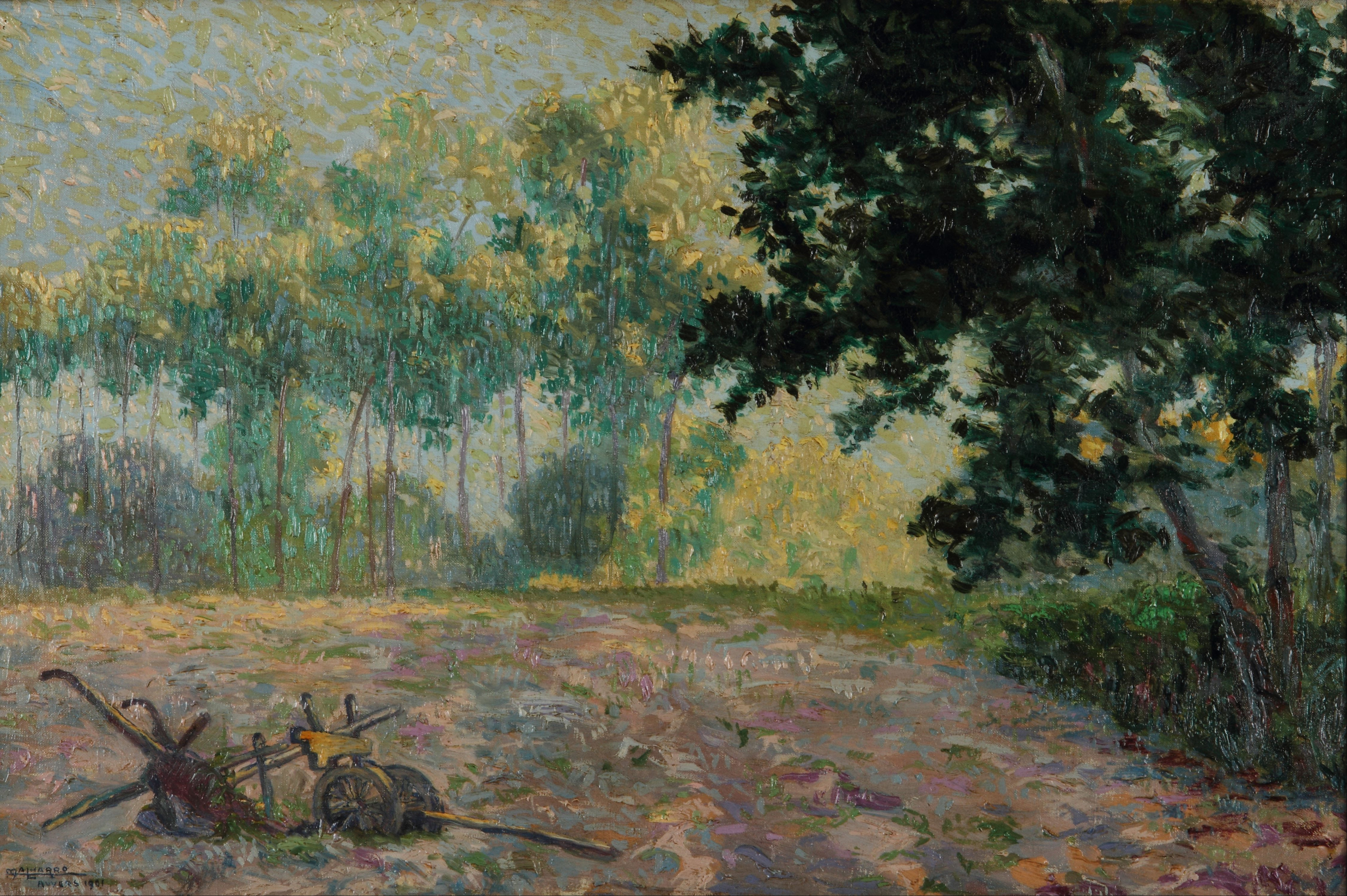
The Tiller, oil on canvas, 1901.

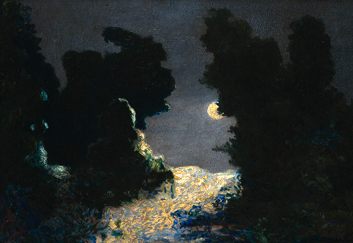
Nocturno, 1909

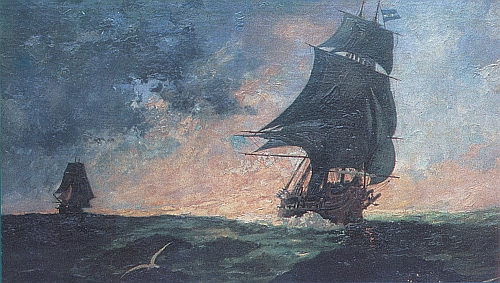
Corsair La Argentina, oil on canvas, 1895.

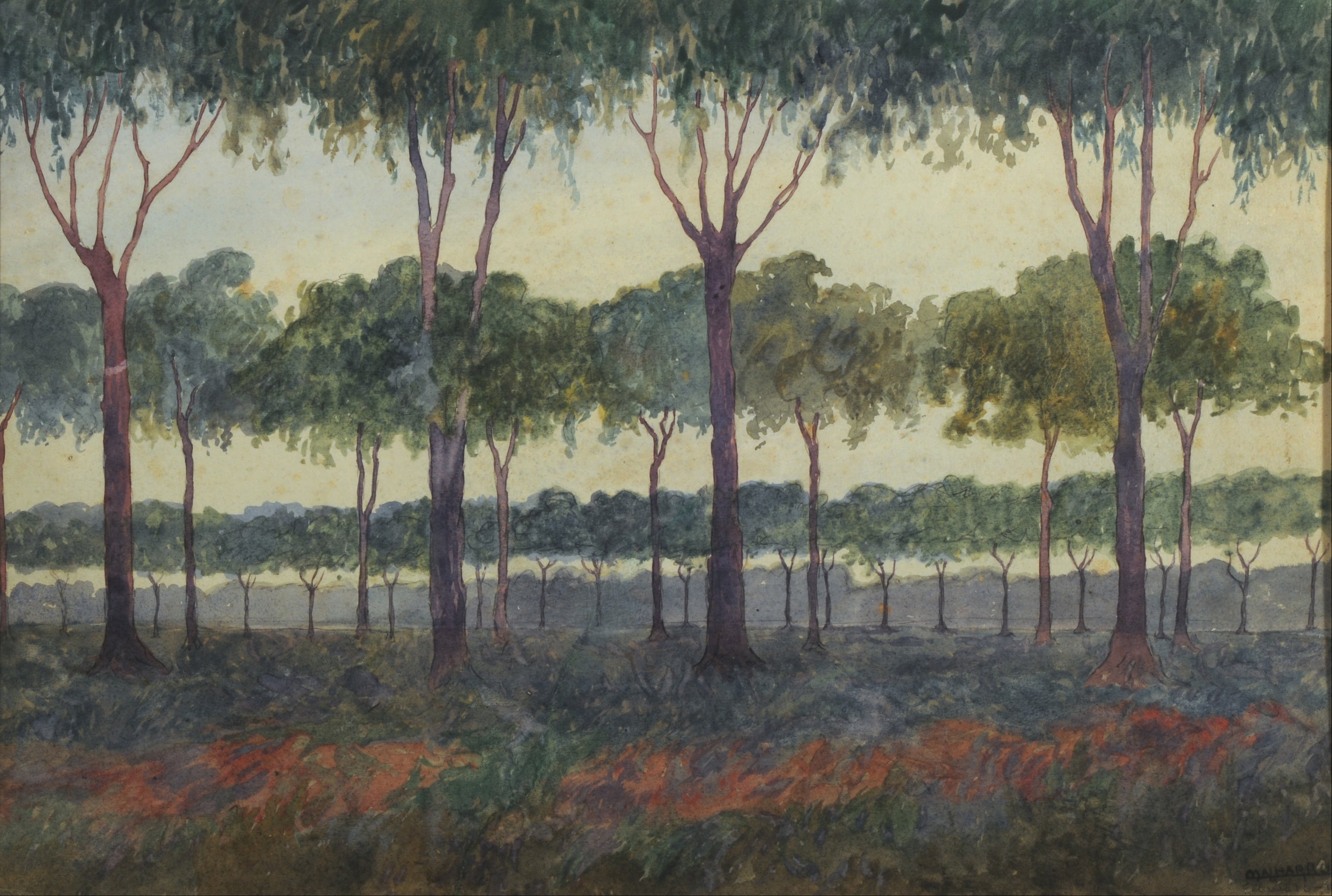
