= List of paintings by William-Adolphe Bouguereau =

The painted work of William-Adolphe Bouguereau (La Rochelle, 30 November 1825 – La Rochelle, 19 August 1905) consists of 828 paintings (listed in the catalogue raisonné by Damien Bartoli and Frederick C. Ross) produced by the artist between 1845 and 1905. It is arranged in chronological order.

== 1840s ==
Image	Title	Date	Dimensions	Notes	Current location	N° du Catalogue raisonné (Bartoli-Ross, 2010)
	Jacob receives Joseph's bloodstained tunic	1845	110,5 × 144 cm	Painted for the historical painting competition of the École des Beaux-Arts of Bordeaux in 1845.	Private collection	1845/01
	Portrait of Aunt Adèle	1845	55 × 46 cm		La Rochelle, musée des Beaux-Arts	1845/02
	Portrait of a Seated Woman with a Pink Bow	1845	32,5 × 24 cm		Private collection	1845/03
	Portrait of a Seated Woman	1845	32 × 24 cm		Private collection	1845/04
	Portrait of One of the Abbés Hontang	1846	60 × 50,5 cm		Private collection	1846/01
	Portrait of Ferdinand Chaigneau (head)	1847	41 × 33 cm		Private collection	1847/01
	Portrait of Ferdinand Chaigneau (head and hands)	1847	77 × 60 cm		Private collection	1847/02
	Portrait of the painter Édouard Brandon		40,5 x 32,5 cm	→ see 1855 (date revised on the basis of stylistic and biographical analysis)	Private collection	1847/03
	Portrait of Marie-Célina Brieu	1847	134 × 110 cm		Private collection	1847/04
	Saint Peter at Mary's House after His Release from Prison	1848	24 × 32 cm	Sketch for the 1848 Prix de Rome	Paris, Musée d’Orsay	Not catalogued
	Saint Peter at Mary's House after His Release from Prison	1848	114 × 147 cm	Painting submitted in 1848 for the Prix de Rome in painting. Bouguereau was awarded the Second Grand Prize, alongside Gustave Boulanger.	Private collection	1848/02
	Portrait of the Sculptor Chevallier	1848	41 × 32 cm		Private collection	1848/03
	Equality Before Death	1848	141 × 269 cm		Paris, Musée d’Orsay	1848/04
	Ulysses Recognized by Eurycleia	1849	112 × 145 cm	Painting submitted in 1849 for the Prix de Rome in painting. Bouguereau did not win the Prize, which was awarded to Gustave Boulanger.	La Rochelle, musée des Beaux-Arts	1849/03

== 1850s ==
Image	Title	Date	Dimensions	Notes	Current location	N° du Catalogue raisonné (Bartoli-Ross, 2010)
	Self‑portrait	1850	60,5 × 50 cm		Private collection	1850/01
	Disdain	1850	65 × 50 cm	Painted in 1850 for the competition in painted expressive heads.	Paris, École nationale supérieure des Beaux-Arts	1850/04
	Shepherds Find Zenobia on the Banks of the Araxes	1850	32 × 24 cm	Painted sketch for the 1850 Prix de Rome.	Paris, musée d'Orsay	Not catalogued
	Shepherds Find Zenobia on the Banks of the Araxes	1850	32 × 24 cm	Painted sketch for the 1850 Prix de Rome.	Paris, École nationale supérieure des Beaux-Arts	Not catalogued
	Shepherds Find Zenobia on the Banks of the Araxes	1850	147 × 113 cm	Painting submitted in 1850 for the Prix de Rome in painting. Bouguereau won the prize, alongside Paul Baudry.	Paris, École nationale Supérieure des Beaux-Arts	1850/06
	Torso or Painted Half‑Figure	1850	100 × 81 cm	Painted on 29 June 1850 for the competition in painted half‑figures.	Paris, École nationale supérieure des Beaux-Arts	1850/07
	The Lovers	1850	74 × 60 cm		Private collection	1850/08
	Dante and Virgil	1850	280,5 × 225,3 cm		Paris, musée d'Orsay	1850/10
	Portrait of Monsieur M.	1850	86,5 × 70,5 cm		Pasadena, The Norton Simon Museum of Art	1850/11
	Portrait of Eugène Bouguereau, the Artist's Uncle	1850	46 × 41 cm		Private collection	1850/12
	Portrait of Adolphe Bouguereau, the Artist's Uncle	1850	56 × 45,5 cm		Private collection	1850/13
	Portrait of Amélina Dufaud, née Bouguereau, the Artist's Aunt	1850	56 × 45,5 cm		Private collection	1850/14
	Portrait of Céline Bouguereau, the Artist's Cousin	1850	33 × 25 cm		Private collection	1850/15
	Portrait of Léonie Bouguereau, the Artist's Cousin	1850	28,5 × 23 cm		Private collection	1850/16
	Portrait of a Man	1850	46 × 38 cm			1850/16
	Portrait of Félix Chabaud, Medal Engraver	1852	47 × 37 cm		Rome, Académie de France	1852/01
	Portrait of Joseph‑Gabriel Tourny, Engraver	1852	47 × 37 cm		Rome, Académie de France	1852/02
	The Jews Led into Captivity	1852	77 × 103 cm		Private collection	1852/04
	The Canephorae	1852	244 × 176 cm		Private collection	1852/05
	Idyll	1852	84,5 × 63,5 cm		Mexico, Fondation Juan Antonio Pérez Simon	1852/06
	Self‑portrait	1853	40,5 × 32 cm		Private collection	1853/01
	Copy of Raphael's Galatea	1853	230 × 220 cm		Dijon, musée des Beaux-Arts	1853/05
	The Battle of the Centaurs and the Lapiths	1853	124 × 173,5 cm		Richmond, Virginia Museum of Fine Arts	1853/07
	Portrait of Jean‑Pierre Rémy Lasserre	1853	62 × 49 cm		Private collection	1853/10
	Portrait of Charles Garnier	1853	41 × 32,5 cm		Paris, École nationale Supérieure des Beaux-Arts	1853/15
	Portrait of Martial Deveaux, Line Engraver	1853	46 × 36 cm		Rome, Académie de France	1853/16
	Portrait of Teresa	1854	40 × 32 cm		Valenciennes, musée des Beaux-Arts	1854/01
	Portrait of Gabriel‑Jules Thomas, Sculptor	1854	47 × 36 cm		Rome, Académie de France	1854/03
	Head of a Bacchante	1854	60 × 48 cm		Moulins, musée des Beaux-Arts	1854/04
	Head of a Bacchante (Replica)	1854	60 × 50 cm		Private collection	1854/04A
	The Body of Saint Cecilia Brought into the Catacombs of Rome	1854	343 × 428 cm	Sent from Rome in 1854. Destroyed in the fire that struck the chapel of the Château de Lunéville on 3 January 2003.	Destroyed (formerly at the Château of Lunéville)	1854/05
	Self‑portrait	1854	47 × 36 cm		Rome, Académie de France	1854/06
	First Portrait of Catherine Bouguereau	1854	64,5 × 53,5 cm		Private collection	1854/07
	Second Portrait of Catherine Bouguereau	1854	100 × 80 cm		Private collection	1854/08
	Brotherly Love	1854	147 × 113,7 cm		Boston, Museum of Fine Arts	1854/10
	Brotherly Love (Reduction)	1854	64,5 × 53 cm		Private collection	1854/10A
	Portrait of a Man	1854			Current location unknown	1854/11
	Spring	1854	180 × 85 cm	Painted for Paul Monlun's pavilion in Angoulins.	Private collection	1854/12A
	Summer	1854	180 × 85 cm	Painted for Paul Monlun's pavilion in Angoulins.	Private collection	1854/12B
	Autumn	1854	180 × 85 cm	Painted for Paul Monlun's pavilion in Angoulins.	Private collection	1854/12C
	Winter	1854	180 × 85 cm	Painted for Paul Monlun's pavilion in Angoulins.	Private collection	1854/12D
	Fishing	1855	60 × 200 cm	Painted for Paul Monlun's pavilion in Angoulins.	Private collection	1855/01A
	Hunting	1855	60 × 200 cm	Painted for Paul Monlun's pavilion in Angoulins.	Private collection	1855/01B
	Dance	1855	60 × 200 cm	Painted for Paul Monlun's pavilion in Angoulins.	Private collection	1855/01C
	Bathing	1855	60 × 200 cm	Painted for Paul Monlun's pavilion in Angoulins.	Private collection	1855/01D
	Love	1855	270 × 150 cm	Painted in 1855–1856 for the salon of Anatole Bartholoni's private mansion at 55 rue de Verneuil in Paris.	Paris, Ambassade des États-Unis	1855/02A
	Friendship	1855	270 × 150 cm	Painted in 1855–1856 for the salon of Anatole Bartholoni's private mansion at 55 rue de Verneuil in Paris.	Paris, Ambassade des États-Unis	1855/02B
	Fortune	1856	270 × 150 cm	Painted in 1855–1856 for the salon of Anatole Bartholoni's private mansion at 55 rue de Verneuil in Paris.	Paris, Ambassade des États-Unis	1855/02C
	Arion on a Sea Monster	1856	71 × 112 cm	Painted in 1855–1856 for the salon of Anatole Bartholoni's private mansion at 55 rue de Verneuil in Paris.	Cleveland, Museum of Art	1855/03A
	Bacchante on a Panther	1856	71 × 112 cm	Painted in 1855–1856 for the salon of Anatole Bartholoni's private mansion at 55 rue de Verneuil in Paris.	Cleveland, Museum of Art	1855/03B
	Autumn Scenes	1855	52 × 102 cm	Painted in 1855–1856 for the salon of Anatole Bartholoni's private mansion at 55 rue de Verneuil in Paris.	Yamanashi (Japan), Prefectural Museum	1855/04B
	Idyll, Ancient Family	1855	91 × 71 cm		Private collection	1855/05A
	Idyll, Ancient Family (Reduction)	1855	60 × 48 cm		Hartford (Connecticut), Wadsworth Atheneum	1855/05B
	Portrait of Fernand Bartholoni	1855	56 × 46 cm		Private collection	1855/07
	Roman Scene	1855	110 × 81,5 cm		Private collection	1855/08
	Portrait of Mademoiselle Couder	1855	116 × 89 cm		La Rochelle, musée des Beaux-Arts	1855/09
	Portrait of the painter Édouard Brandon	circa 1855	40,5 x 32,5 cm	Date revised on the basis of stylistic and biographical analysis	Private collection	1847/03
	Dance	1856	366 × 181 cm	Painted in 1856 for the ceiling of the boudoir in Jean‑François Bartholoni's private mansion on rue de la Rochefoucauld in Paris.	Paris, musée d'Orsay	1856/01
	Music	1856	116 × 172 cm	Painted in 1856 for the ceiling of the boudoir in Jean‑François Bartholoni's private mansion on rue de la Rochefoucauld in Paris.	Tokyo, National Museum of Western Art	1856/02A
	Love Asking for His Weapons Back	1856	118 × 72 cm	Painted in 1856 for the ceiling of the boudoir in Jean‑François Bartholoni's private mansion on rue de la Rochefoucauld in Paris.	Tokyo, National Museum of Western Art	1856/02B
	Love Punished	1856	111 × 74,5 cm	Painted in 1856 for the ceiling of the boudoir in Jean‑François Bartholoni's private mansion on rue de la Rochefoucauld in Paris.	Tokyo, National Museum of Western Art	1856/02C
	History and Astronomy	1856		Painted in 1856 for the ceiling of the boudoir in Jean‑François Bartholoni's private mansion on rue de la Rochefoucauld in Paris.	Current location unknown	1856/02D
	Dance and Music	1856		Painted in 1856 for the ceiling of the boudoir in Jean‑François Bartholoni's private mansion on rue de la Rochefoucauld in Paris.	Current location unknown	1856/02E
	Tragedy and Comedy	1856		Painted in 1856 for the ceiling of the boudoir in Jean‑François Bartholoni's private mansion on rue de la Rochefoucauld in Paris.	Current location unknown	1856/02F
	Poetry and Eloquence	1856		Painted in 1856 for the ceiling of the boudoir in Jean‑François Bartholoni's private mansion on rue de la Rochefoucauld in Paris.	Current location unknown	1856/02G
	The Four Hours of the Day (First Replica)	1856	250 × 250 cm	Executed for the ceiling of the Monlun residence in Angoulins.	Private collection	1856/03A
	The Four Hours of the Day (Second Replica)	1856	250 × 250 cm		Private collection	1856/03B
	The Return of Tobias	1856	124 × 100 cm		Dijon, musée des Beaux-Arts	1856/04
	Emperor Napoleon III Visiting the Flood Victims of Tarascon	1857	200 × 320 cm	Painting commissioned by the Minister of State, Achille Fould.	Tarascon, mairie	1857/01
	Portrait of Madame Monlun and Her Daughter Élisa	1857	123 × 94 cm		Private collection	1857/03
	Portrait of Mademoiselle Lucie Carnaud	1857	53,5 × 45 cm		Private collection	1857/04
	The Seasons	1857	344 × 389 cm	Painted for the ceiling of the Salon des Saisons in the Pereire mansion, 35 rue du Faubourg Saint‑Honoré in Paris.	Current location unknown	1857/05
	The Triumph of Venus	1857	134,5 × 112 cm	Executed for the Salon of Day and Night (or Salon of the Day) in the Pereire private mansion.	Private collection	1857/06A
	Child on a Griffin	1857	64 × 87,5 cm	Executed for the Salon of Day and Night (or Salon of the Day) in the Pereire private mansion.	Private collection	1857/06B
	Child on a Sea Monster	1857	63,5 × 84 cm	Executed for the Salon of Day and Night (or Salon of the Day) in the Pereire private mansion.	Private collection	1857/06C
	Wounded Love	1857	82 × 64 cm		Private collection	1857/07
	Flora	1858		Painted for the ceiling of the Salon des Saisons in the Pereire mansion on rue du Faubourg Saint‑Honoré in Paris.	Current location unknown	1858/01A
	Ceres	1858		Painted for the ceiling of the Salon des Saisons in the Pereire mansion on rue du Faubourg Saint‑Honoré in Paris.	Current location unknown	1858/01B
	Pomona	1858		Painted for the ceiling of the Salon des Saisons in the Pereire mansion on rue du Faubourg Saint‑Honoré in Paris.	Current location unknown	1858/01C
	Vesta	1858		Painted for the ceiling of the Salon des Saisons in the Pereire mansion on rue du Faubourg Saint‑Honoré in Paris.	Current location unknown	1858/01D
	Spring	1858	80 × 152,5 cm	Painted for the ceiling of the Salon des Saisons in the Pereire mansion on rue du Faubourg Saint‑Honoré in Paris.	Private collection	1858/02A
	Summer	1858		Painted for the ceiling of the Salon des Saisons in the Pereire mansion on rue du Faubourg Saint‑Honoré in Paris.	Current location unknown	1858/02B
	Autumn	1858	63,5 × 116 cm	Painted for the ceiling of the Salon des Saisons in the Pereire mansion on rue du Faubourg Saint‑Honoré in Paris.	Current location unknown	1858/02C
	Winter	1858		Painted for the ceiling of the Salon des Saisons in the Pereire mansion on rue du Faubourg Saint‑Honoré in Paris.	Current location unknown	1858/02D
	Day and Night	1858		Painted for the ceiling of the Salon des Saisons in the Pereire mansion on rue du Faubourg Saint‑Honoré in Paris.	Current location unknown	1858/03
	The Sleep of Endymion	1858		Painted for the ceiling of the Salon des Saisons in the Pereire mansion on rue du Faubourg Saint‑Honoré in Paris.	Current location unknown	1858/04
	Portrait of Mademoiselle Jeanne Lanusse	1858	59 × 48 cm		La Rochelle, musée des Beaux-Arts	1858/05
	Portrait of Monsieur Lanusse	1858	60 × 50 cm		La Rochelle, musée des Beaux-Arts	1858/06
	Portrait of Madame Lanusse	1858			Current location unknown	1858/07
	Portrait of Nelly Bouguereau	1858	46 × 38 cm		Private collection	1858/08
	All Souls’ Day	1859	147 × 120 cm		Bordeaux, musée des Beaux-Arts	1859/01
	All Souls’ Day (Reduction)	1859	147 × 120 cm		Private collection	1859/01A
	Charity	1859	116,5 × 90 cm		Ann Arbor (Michigan), University of Michigan Museum of Art	1859/02
	Charity (Reduction)	1859	56 × 45,5 cm		Taipei, musée national du Palais	1859/02A
	Portrait of Madame Gabrielle Marcotte de Quivières	1859	100 × 73 cm		Current location unknown	1859/03
	Saint Louis Rendering Justice	1859		Painted for the Saint‑Louis Chapel of the Church of Sainte‑Clotilde in Paris.	Paris, Church of Sainte‑Clotilde	1859/04A
	Saint Louis Bringing the Crown of Thorns Back to Paris	1859		Painted for the Saint‑Louis Chapel of the Church of Sainte‑Clotilde in Paris.	Paris, Church of Sainte‑Clotilde	1859/04B
	Saint Louis Caring for the Plague‑Stricken	1859		Painted for the Saint‑Louis Chapel of the Church of Sainte‑Clotilde in Paris.	Paris, Church of Sainte‑Clotilde	1859/04C
	The Last Communion of Saint Louis	1859		Painted for the Saint‑Louis Chapel of the Church of Sainte‑Clotilde in Paris.	Paris, Church of Sainte‑Clotilde	1859/04D
	Faith, Hope, Charity, Prudence, Justice, Temperance	1859		Painted for the Saint‑Louis Chapel of the Church of Sainte‑Clotilde in Paris.	Paris, Church of Sainte‑Clotilde	1859/05

== 1860s ==
Image	Title	Date	Dimensions	Notes	Current location	Catalogue raisonné number (Bartoli‑Ross, 2010)
	Ancient Pastoral: The Return from the Fields	1860	116 × 89 cm	Salon of 1861, no. 349	Private collection	1860/01
	Ancient Pastoral: The Return from the Fields (Reduction)	1860	62 × 48 cm		Private collection	1860/01A
	Peace	1860	84 × 106,5 cm	Salon of 1861, no. 348	Saint-Louis (Missouri), Saint-Louis Art Museum	1860/02
	The Departure of Tobias	1860	153 × 119 cm		Saint-Pétersbourg, musée de l'Ermitage	1860/03
	Woman of Tivoli	1860			Current location unknown	1860/04
	Woman of Alvito	1860			Current location unknown	1860/05
	Faun and Bacchante	1860	53,5 × 64 cm	Salon of 1861, no. 347	Private collection	1860/07
	Ancient Pastoral: The Shepherd’s Departure	1861	116 × 89 cm		Private collection	1861/01
	Ancient Pastoral: The Shepherd’s Departure (Reduction)	1861	62 × 48 cm		Private collection	1861/01A
	The Woman of Cervara and Her Child	1861	109 × 83 cm		Private collection	1861/02
	Young Mother Watching Two Children Kiss	1861	84 × 103 cm		Private collection	1861/03
	First Discord	1861	196 × 150,5 cm	Salon of 1861, no. 346	Private collection	1861/04
	Philomela and Procne	1861	176 × 134 cm (ovale)		Fontainebleau, musée national du château	1861/05
	Philomela and Procne (Reduction)	1861	60 × 50 cm		Private collection	1861/05A
	The Muse (Philomela)	1861	136 × 96,5 cm		Oklahoma City, Oklahoma Heritage Society	1861/06
	Remorse, or Orestes Pursued by the Furies	1862	231,1 × 278,4 cm		Norfolk (Virginie) (Virginie), Chrysler Museum of Art	1862/01
	Bacchante Teasing a Goat	1862	115 × 185 cm		Bordeaux, musée des Beaux-Arts	1862/02
	Bacchante Teasing a Goat (Replica)	1862	114,5 × 192 cm	Painting perhaps executed by his pupil Cot.	Private collection	1862/02A
	The Holy Family	1863	138 × 109 cm		Tainan, Chimei Museum	1863/01
	The Holy Family (Reduction)	1863	60 × 48,5 cm		Private collection	1863/01A
	The Holy Family (Another Version)	1863	130 × 110 cm		Private collection	1863/01B
	The Golden Age	1863	81,5 × 100,5 cm		Mexico, Juan Antonio Pérez Simón Foundation	1863/02
	Portrait of Monsieur Gustave Pereire's Child, Aged 5	1863	82 × 65,5 cm		Private collection	1863/03
	Portrait of Monsieur Gustave Pereire's Child, Aged 2	1863	80 × 70 cm		Private collection	1863/04
	Love	1863	41,5 × 32,5 cm		Private collection	1863/05
	Love Trying His Arrows	1863			Current location unknown	1863/06
	Love Trying His Arrows (Modified or Reduction)	1863	65 × 54 cm		Private collection	1863/06A
	Love with the Thyrsus	1863	41,5 × 32,5 cm		Private collection	1863/07
	Portrait of Mademoiselle Pauline Brissac	1863	91 × 71 cm		Private collection	1863/08
	The Kiss	1863	114 × 86,5 cm		Private collection	1863/09
	The Kiss (Reduction)	1863	61 × 51 cm		Private collection	1863/09A
	War	1864	84 × 105 cm		Mexico, Juan Antonio Pérez Simón Foundation	1864/01
	The Elder Sister	1864	117 × 100 cm		Private collection	1864/02
	The Elder Sister (First Reduction)	1864	55 × 45,5 cm		New York City, The Brooklyn Museum	1864/02A
	Sleep	1864	156 × 119,5 cm		Private collection	1864/03
	Sleep (Reduction)	1864	61,5 × 51,5 cm		Private collection	1864/03A
	Bather	1864	166 × 103,5 cm		Gand, Museum of Fine Arts	1864/04
	The Reader	1864	57 × 47 cm		Hartford (Connecticut), Wadsworth Atheneum	1864/06
	Portrait of Marie‑Gabrielle Anne Marcotte de Quivières	1864	111,5 × 76 cm		Tokyo, Hachioji-city, Murauchi Museum	1864/07
	Portrait of Marie‑Thérèse Bartholoni	1864	221 × 150 cm		Tainan, Chimei Museum	1864/08
	Portrait of the Architect Jean‑Louis Pascal	1864	46 × 38 cm		Private collection	1864/09
	The Indigent Family	1865	122 × 153 cm		Birmingham, City Museum and Art Gallery	1865/01
	The Indigent Family (Reduction)	1865	56 × 70 cm		Richmond (Indiana), Art Association of Richmond	1865/01A
	The Rising	1865	115,5 × 89 cm		Private collection	1865/02
	The Rising (First Reduction)	1865	55 × 46 cm		Private collection	1865/02A
	The Rising (Second Reduction)	1865	25,5 × 20 cm		Private collection	1865/02B
	The Oranges	1865	117 × 90 cm		Private collection	1865/03
	The Oranges (Reduction)	1865	63,5 × 51 cm		Private collection	1865/03A
	The Soup	1865	81,5 × 60 cm		Private collection	1865/04
	The Soup (Replica)	1865	73,5 × 57 cm		Private collection	1865/04A
	Leaving for School	1865	63,5 × 53 cm		Private collection	1865/05
	Portrait of Madame Hoskier	1865	88,5 × 66,5 cm		Private collection	1865/06
	The Older Sister	1865	100 × 73,5 cm		Private collection	1865/07
	The Older Sister (Reduction)	1865	55 × 41 cm		Saint-Johnsbury (Vermont), Athenaeum	1865/07A
	The Awakening	1865	100,5 × 81,5 cm		Private collection	1865/09
	The Awakening (Reduction)	1865	56 × 46 cm		Private collection	1865/09A
	Joy in the Home	1865			Private collection	1865/10
	Joy in the Home (Reduction)	1865			Private collection	1865/10A
	Prayer	1865	65 × 53 cm		Private collection	1865/11
	Portrait of a Young Girl in Mauve	1865	63,5 × 50,5 cm		Private collection	1865/12
	Invocation to the Virgin	1866	134,5 × 96,5 cm		Tainan, Chimei Museum	1866/02
	Invocation to the Virgin (First Reduction)	1866	55 × 45,5 cm		Private collection	1866/02A
	Invocation to the Virgin (Second Reduction)	1866	27 × 18,5 cm		Private collection	1866/02B
	First Caresses	1866	190 × 127,5 cm		Private collection	1866/03
	First Caresses (First Reduction)	1866	100 × 67 cm		Private collection	1866/03A
	First Caresses (Second Reduction)	1866	65,5 × 44 cm		Springfield (Utah), Springfield Museum	1866/03B
	Covetousness (Reduction)	1866	97 × 65 cm		Amsterdam, Willet-Holthuysen Museum	1866/04A
	Covetousness (Reduction)	1866	65,4 × 44,1 cm		Current location unknown	1866/04
	Portrait of Madame la Vicomtesse de Chabrol	1866	130,5 × 98 cm	Salon of 1867, no. 182 Commissioned from Bouguereau on 8 May 1866 by François‑Gaspard (1821–1891), Vicomte de Chabrol‑Chaméane, husband of the Vicomtesse (Marie‑Jeanne‑Léonie Guillaume, c. 1832–1905).	Private collection	1866/05
	Saint Peter and Saint Paul	1866	320 cm	Painted to adorn the Saint‑Peter‑and‑Saint‑Paul Chapel in the Church of Saint‑Augustin in Paris.	Paris, Church of Saint‑Augustin	1866/07A
	Saint Peter Baptizing	1866	320 cm	Painted to adorn the Saint‑Peter‑and‑Saint‑Paul Chapel in the Church of Saint‑Augustin in Paris.	Paris, Church of Saint‑Augustin	1866/07B
	Saint Peter Evangelizing	1866	320 cm	Painted to adorn the Saint‑Peter‑and‑Saint‑Paul Chapel in the Church of Saint‑Augustin in Paris.	Paris, Church of Saint‑Augustin	1866/07C
	Saint John the Baptist Preaching in the Desert	1866	320 cm	Painted to adorn the Saint‑Peter‑and‑Saint‑Paul Chapel in the Church of Saint‑Augustin in Paris.	Paris, Church of Saint‑Augustin	1866/07D
	Saint John the Baptist Baptizing Christ	1866	320 cm	Painted to adorn the Saint‑Peter‑and‑Saint‑Paul Chapel in the Church of Saint‑Augustin in Paris.	Paris, Church of Saint‑Augustin	1866/07E
	The Head of Saint John the Baptist Presented to Herodias	1866	320 cm	Painted to adorn the Saint‑Peter‑and‑Saint‑Paul Chapel in the Church of Saint‑Augustin in Paris.	Paris, Church of Saint‑Augustin	1866/07F
	The Book of Hours	1867	66 × 53,5 cm		Private collection	1867/01
	Yvonette	1867	131 × 85 cm		Private collection	1867/02
	Yvonette (Reduction)	1867	64 × 40,5 cm		Private collection	1867/02A
	The Cherished Bird	1867	87,5 × 69 cm		Yamagata, Yamadera Goto Museum	1867/03
	The Cherished Bird (Reduction)	1867	34 × 27 cm		Current location unknown	1867/03A
	Soap Bubbles	1867			Current location unknown	1867/04
	Soap Bubbles (Reduction)	1867	26,5 × 21 cm		Private collection	1867/04A
	Gypsy Girl with Tambourine	1867	100 × 63,5 cm		Private collection	1867/05
	Gypsy Girl with Tambourine (Replica)	1867	100 × 64 cm		Private collection	1867/05A
	The Vow	1867	147,2 × 107 cm		Philadelphia, Museum of Art	1867/06
	The Vow (Reduction)	1867 ou après	57,8 × 41,9 cm		Private collection	1867/06A
	Far from Home	1867	160 × 106 cm		Ponce, Museo de Arte	1867/07
	Far from Home	1867	92 × 62 cm		Private collection	1867/07A
	Head of a Little Girl	1867			Current location unknown	1867/08
	Alone in the World	1867	100 × 67 cm		Private collection	1867/09
	Art and Literature	1867	200 × 108 cm		Elmira, The Arnot Art Museum	1867/10
	Landscape of Concarneau	1867	54 × 84,5 cm		Private collection	Not catalogued
	Young Schoolgirl	1868	46 × 38 cm		Private collection	1868/01
	Distraction	1868			Private collection	1868/02
	Sleeping Children	1868	66,5 × 100 cm		Private collection	1868/03
	Sleeping Children (First Reduction)	1868	30 × 56 cm		Private collection	1868/03A
	Sleeping Children (Second Reduction)	1868	46 x 55,2 cm		Private collection	1868/03B
	Sleeping Children (Another Version)	1868	65 × 100 cm		Private collection	1868/03C
	Pastoral	1868	114 × 163 cm		Private collection	1868/04
	Pastoral (Reduction)	1868	55 × 77,5 cm		Private collection	1868/04A
	Pepita (Spanish Girl's Head)	1868	66 × 56 cm		Current location unknown	1868/05
	Pepita (Spanish Girl's Head) (Replica)	1868	66 × 56 cm		Private collection	1868/05A
	Young Shepherdess	1868	106 × 72 cm		Ocala, Florida University, Appleton Museum of Art	1868/06
	Young Shepherdess (Reduction)	1868	55 × 46,5 cm		Private collection	1868/06A
	Reaper	1868	106,5 × 85 cm		Private collection	1868/07
	The Bunch of Grapes	1868	146 × 114 cm		Private collection	1868/08
	The Bunch of Grapes	1868	58,5 × 45,5 cm		Private collection	1868/08A
	Shrimp Fisherwoman	1868	72,5 × 54,5 cm		Private collection	1868/09
	Little Breton Girl Eating Her Soup	1868	53 × 44,5 cm		Current location unknown	1868/10
	Little Girl with Blue Eyes	1868	42 × 33,5 cm		Notre Dame (Indiana), Notre Dame University, The Snite Museum of Art	1868/11
	Jeannie	1868	102 × 72,5 cm		Private collection	1868/12
	The Hawthorn Blossom	1868	55 × 45,5 cm		Luxembourg, musée Pescatore	1868/13
	The Pearl Necklace	1868	64 × 54 cm		Ponce, Museo de Arte	1868/14
	The Flute Lesson	1868	113 × 86,5 cm		Private collection	1868/15
	The Pastoral Recreation	1868	113,9 x 162,9 cm		Private collection	
	Between Wealth and Love	1869	106,5 × 89 cm		Private collection	1869/01
	Young Mother (The Guardian Angel)	1869	99 × 78,5 cm		New York City, The New York Historical Society	1869/02
	The Guardian Angel	1869	51 × 40,5 cm		Private collection	1869/02A
	Rustic Toilette	1869	131 × 90 cm		Private collection	1869/03
	Mignon	1869	100,5 × 81 cm		Private collection	1869/04
	Child's Head, Study	1869	35,5 × 28 cm		Private collection	1869/05
	Return from the Market	1869	61 × 51 cm		Private collection	1869/06
	Young Worker	1869	129 × 96,5 cm		Private collection	1869/07
	Maternal Admiration	1869	116,5 × 91 cm		Private collection	1869/08
	Maternal Admiration (Reduction)	1869	56 × 39 cm		Private collection	1869/08A
	The Knitting Girl	1869	145 × 99 cm		Omaha (Nebraska), The Joslyn Art Museum	1869/09
	Haymaker	1869	101,5 × 81 cm		Pittsburgh, Carnegie Museum of Art	1869/10
	Portraits of Madame Johnson's Children	1869	101,5 × 81 cm		Private collection	1869/11
	The Crab	1869	81 × 65,5 cm		Private collection	1869/12
	The Elder Sister	1869	130 × 97 cm		Houston, The Museum of Fine Arts	1869/13
	Crossing the Ford	1869	160 × 104 cm		Private collection	1869/14
	Washerwomen of Fouesnant	1869	75 × 61 cm		Rochester, University of Rochester, Memorial Art Gallery	1869/15
	Girls of Fouesnant Returning from the Market	1869	112 × 96,5 cm		Private collection	1869/16
	Girls of Fouesnant Returning from the Market	1869	76,8 x 60,6 cm		Private collection	Not catalogued
	Italian Girl with Tambourine	1869	63,5 × 53 cm		Private collection	1869/17
	Italian Girl at the Fountain	1869	101 × 80,9 cm		Kansas City, Nelson-Atkins Museum of Art	1869/18
	The Vow at Sainte‑Anne‑d’Auray	1869	146 × 112 cm		Current location unknown	1869/19
	The Vow at Sainte‑Anne‑d’Auray	1869	61 x 50 cm		Bilbao, Museo de Bellas Artes	Not catalogued
	The Vow at Sainte‑Anne‑d’Auray (Second Version)	1869	147 × 89,5 cm		Private collection	1869/19A
	The Vow at Sainte‑Anne‑d’Auray (Reduction of the Second Version)	1869	63,5 × 53 cm		Current location unknown	1869/19B
	Portrait of Madame Hoskier	1869	128,5 × 89 cm		Private collection	1869/20
	Portrait of Mademoiselle Martha Hoskier	1869	46 × 38,4 cm		Santa Barbara, Museum of Art	1869/21
	Maternal Admiration	1869			Current location unknown	1869/22
	Maternal Admiration: The Bath	1869	130 × 99,5 cm		Private collection	1869/23
	Apollo and the Muses on Olympus	1869		Ceiling decoration of the main hall of the Bordeaux theatre.	Bordeaux	1869/24
	Martial Music	1869		Grisaille decoration for the ceiling of the main hall of the Bordeaux theatre.	Bordeaux	1869/25A
	Pastoral Music	1869		Grisaille decoration for the ceiling of the main hall of the Bordeaux theatre.	Bordeaux	1869/25B
	Dance Music	1869		Grisaille decoration for the ceiling of the main hall of the Bordeaux theatre.	Bordeaux	1869/25C
	Sacred Music	1869		Grisaille decoration for the ceiling of the main hall of the Bordeaux theatre.	Bordeaux	1869/25D

== 1870s ==
Image	Title	Date	Dimensions	Notes	Current location	Catalogue raisonné number (Bartoli‑Ross, 2010)
	Bather	1870	190,5 × 95 cm		Figueras, Dali Museum	1870/01
	Oriental Girl	1870	100,5 × 69 cm		Private collection	1870/02
	The Violet Bouquet	1870	65 × 55 cm		Private collection	1870/03
	Little Italian Girl Carrying Grass	1870			Current location unknown	1870/04
	Italian Girl at the Fountain	1870	91,5 × 73,5 cm		Private collection	1870/05
	The Woman with the Glove	1870	61 × 51 cm		Private collection	1870/06
	Haymaker	1870	117 × 84 cm		Private collection	1870/07
	Pifferaro	1870	100 × 78 cm		Private collection	1870/08
	The Italian with the Mandolin	1870	100 × 83 cm		Private collection	1870/09
	Shepherdess of the Bordelais	1871	61 × 50 cm		Private collection	1871/02
	Breton Knitter	1871			Private collection	1871/03
	Little Sulker (Full‑Length Figure)	1871	104,5 × 78,5 cm		Private collection	1871/04
	The Two Sisters	1871	91,5 × 70 cm		Private collection	1871/05
	The Picture Book (Head with Hands)	1871	46 × 38 cm		Private collection	1871/06
	Eve	1871			Current location unknown	1871/07
	Meditation	1871			Current location unknown	1871/08
	Cherries	1871	131 × 89 cm		Baltimore, The Walters Art Museum	1871/09
	Breton Brother and Sister	1871	129,2 × 89,2 cm		New York City, The Metropolitan Museum of Art	1871/10
	The Sound of the Sea	1871	78 × 53 cm		Private collection	1871/11
	Young Mother Watching Her Child	1871	76 × 95 cm		Private collection	1871/12
	Young Italian Girl Drawing Water	1871	119,5 × 79 cm		Private collection	1871/13
	The Trellis	1871	112 × 75 cm		Private collection	1871/14
	The Seashell	1871	131 × 89,5 cm		New York City, The Forbes Magazine Collection	1871/17
	The Seashell, Two Figures (Reduction)	1871	61 × 42 cm		Amsterdam, Stedelijk Museum	1871/17A
	The Rising	1871	142 × 103 cm		New York City, The Metropolitan Museum of Art	1871/18
	Portrait of Madame Lanusse‑Meyer	1872	62 × 51 cm		La Rochelle, musée des Beaux-Arts	1872/01
	Child's Head or Violets	1872	51,5 × 39 cm		Philadelphia, Drexel University, Drexel Museum and Collections	1872/02
	During the Harvest	1872	112 × 145 cm		Private collection	1872/03
	Reaper	1872	179 × 116 cm		Mexico, Juan Antonio Pérez Simon Foundation	1872/04
	Fisherwoman	1872	144 × 87,5 cm		Tokyo, Fuji Art Museum	1872/05
	The Chilly Girl	1872	66 × 56 cm		Private collection	1872/07
	During the Storm	1872	101,5 × 68,5 cm		Private collection	1872/08
	Italian Girl with a Pitcher	1872	89 × 81 cm		New York City, The New York Society Library	1872/09
	The Girl with the Tambourine	1872	63,5 × 53 cm		Current location unknown	1872/10
	The Italian Girl with the Tambourine	1872	141,5 × 106,5 cm		Private collection	1872/11
	Head of an Italian Girl with a Laurel Wreath	1872			Current location unknown	1872/12
	The Porridge	1872	81 × 50 cm		Private collection	1872/14
	The Little Schoolgirl	1872	81,5 × 46,5 cm		Current location unknown	1872/15
	On the Rock	1872	114 × 82,5 cm		Private collection	1872/16
	Little Marauders	1872	200,5 × 109 cm		Private collection	1872/17
	Seduction	1872	163,5 × 111,8 cm		New York City, The Metropolitan Museum of Art	1872/18
	Nymphs and Satyr	1873	220 × 180 cm	Official url	Williamstown, The Sterling and Francine Clark Institute	1873/01
	Spinner	1873	100 × 91,5 cm		Private collection	1873/03
	Little Louis XIII Girl	1873			Current location unknown	1873/04
	Innocence	1873	66,5 × 56 cm		Private collection	1873/05
	The Newborn Lamb	1873	165 × 87,5 cm		Pittsfield, Berkshire Museum	1873/06
	The Toilette of Venus	1873	130 × 97 cm		Buenos Aires, Museo Nacional de Bellas Artes	1873/07
	The Flute Lesson	1873			Private collection	1873/08
	The Italian Girl with the Fan	1873	66 × 56 cm		Private collection	1873/09
	Tarantella	1873	100 × 83 cm		Private collection	1873/10
	The Veil	1873			Current location unknown	1873/11
	Lullaby (Bedtime)	1873	112 × 86,5 cm		Private collection	1873/12
	Knitter	1873	66,5 × 44 cm		Current location unknown	1873/13
	Portrait of Cortlandt Field Bishop as a Child	1873	112 × 65 cm		New York City, The New York Historical Society	1873/14
	The Fisherman's Daughter	1873	80,5 × 61 cm		Private collection	1873/15
	Italian Girl Carrying Grapes	1874	130 × 95 cm		Current location unknown	1874/01
	An Angel	1874	32,5 × 25,5 cm		Private collection	1874/02
	Italian Girls at the Fountain	1874			Current location unknown	1874/03
	Charity	1874			Current location unknown	1874/04
	Homer and His Guide	1874	208,9 × 142,9 cm		Milwaukee, Art Museum	1874/05
	Italian Child Holding a Crust of Bread	1874	54,5 × 45,5 cm		Private collection	1874/06
	Pifferaro	1874	127 × 101,5 cm		Private collection	1874/07
	Rosière	1874			Current location unknown	1874/08
	Portrait of Mademoiselle Head, Young	1874	129 × 75,5 cm		Private collection	1874/09
	Portrait of Mademoiselle Head	1874	66,5 × 54,5 cm		Private collection	1874/10
	Knitter	1874			Tokyo, Matsuoka Museum of Art	1874/11
	Child with a Cup of Milk	1874	98 × 62 cm		Cincinnati, Art Museum	1874/12
	Child with a Cup of Milk (Reduction)	1874	41 × 33 cm		Private collection	1874/12A
	Little Esmeralda	1874	89 × 54,5 cm		Private collection	1874/13
	Child Braiding a Garland	1874	86 × 56 cm		Private collection	1874/14
	The Little Knitter	1874	69 × 47,5 cm		Private collection	1874/15
	Young Girl Crowned with Vines	1874	42 × 36 cm		Private collection	1874/16
	Grape Harvester	1874	140 × 63 cm		Copenhague, Ny Carlsberg Glyptotek	1874/17
	The Storm	1874	158 × 88 cm		Private collection	1874/18
	The Storm (Reduction)	1874	90,5 × 50,5 cm		Private collection	1874/18A
	After the Bath	1875	181 × 90,5 cm		Figueras, Salvador Dali Museum	1875/01
	Flora and Zephyr	1875	185 cm de diamètre		Mulhouse, musée des Beaux-Arts	1875/02
	The Virgin, the Christ Child, and Saint John the Baptist	1875	200,5 × 122 cm		Private collection	1875/03
	Lullaby (Italian Girl Spinning)	1875	89,5 × 64 cm		Private collection	1875/04
	Child with Green Apples (Bust)	1875			Current location unknown	1875/05
	Child Holding Alfalfa	1875	46 × 38,5 cm		Private collection	1875/06
	Little Ophelia	1875	55 × 46 cm		Private collection	1875/07
	Daydream	1875	55,5 × 46,5 cm		Private collection	1875/08
	Portrait of Aristide Boucicaut	1875	146 × 84 cm		Paris, Le Bon Marché	1875/09
	Portrait of Marguerite Guérin, Madame Boucicaut	1875	146 × 84 cm		Paris, Le Bon Marché	1875/10
	Shepherdess in the Mountains	1875			Current location unknown	1875/11
	Gleaner (Young Girl in a Wheat Field)	1875	131,1 x 78,1 cm		Private collection	1875/13
	Grape Harvester	1875	96 × 61 cm		Private collection	1875/14
	Oriental Woman with Pomegranate	1875	58,5 × 46 cm	Deposited at the Portland Art Museum in 2008.	Private collection	1875/15
	Pomegranate Seller	1875	135 × 87 cm		Private collection	1875/16
	By the Stream	1875	137 × 86 cm		Tokyo, National Museum of Western Art	1875/17
	The Little Knitter	1875	114 × 81 cm		Private collection	1875/18
	The Assumption of the Virgin	1875	1 200 × 1 200 cm	Decoration of the dome of the Chapel of the Virgin in the Cathedral of La Rochelle.	La Rochelle, Cathédrale	1875/19
	Pietà	1876	203 × 148 cm	Deposited at the Dallas Museum of Art.	Private collection	1876/01
	Pietà (Reduction)	1876	100 × 65 cm		Current location unknown	1876/01A
	The Secret	1876	130 × 85 cm		New York City, The New York Historical Society	1876/02
	Fellah Girl, Full‑Length	1876	163 × 88 cm		Private collection	1876/03
	Fellah Girl, Half‑Figure	1876	89 × 56 cm		Newcastle, Laing Art Gallery	1876/04
	Wildflowers	1876			Current location unknown	1876/05
	Loyalty	1876	204 × 92 cm	Commissioned by Aristide Boucicaut for the Bon Marché.	Private collection	1876/06
	The Nativity of Jesus Christ	1876	400 × 300 cm	Decoration of the archivolt of the dome of the Chapel of the Virgin in the Cathedral of La Rochelle.	La Rochelle, Cathedral	1876/08
	Youth and Love	1877	192,5 × 88 cm		Paris, musée d'Orsay	1877/01
	Youth and Love (Reduction)	1877	115,5 × 51 cm		Ocala, Florida University, Appleton Museum of Art	1877/01A
	Consoling Virgin	1877	204 × 148 cm		Strasbourg, musée des Beaux-Arts	1877/02
	Young Girl and Child	1877	61 × 48 cm		Private collection	1877/03
	The Two Sisters	1877	136 × 78 cm		Private collection	1877/04
	The Older Sister	1877	146 × 89 cm		Private collection	1877/05
	The Older Sister (Reduction)	1877	66 × 40,5 cm		Private collection	1877/05A
	The Winder	1877	161,5 × 98 cm		Private collection	1877/06
	Portrait of Monsignor Léon‑Benoît‑Charles Thomas, Bishop of La Rochelle	1877	221 × 124 cm	Painting exhibited at the 1878 Universal Exhibition.	Paris, musée d'Orsay	1877/07
	The Visitation	1877	300 × 400 cm	Decoration of the archivolt of the dome of the Chapel of the Virgin in the Cathedral of La Rochelle.	La Rochelle, Cathédrale	1877/08
	Posthumous Portrait of Georges Bouguereau	1877	80,5 × 63,5 cm		Private collection	1877/09
	Posthumous Portrait of Madame Nelly Bouguereau	1877	78 × 63 cm		Private collection	1877/10
	The Book of Fables	1877	59 × 48,3 cm		Los Angeles, County Museum of Art	1877/11
	Portrait of Madame Deseiligny	1877	137 × 101 cm		La Rochelle, musée des Beaux-Arts	1877/12
	Little Sulker	1878	63,5 × 46 cm		Current location unknown	1878/01
	Prayer	1878	45,5 × 38 cm		Tokyo, The National Museum of Western Art	1878/02
	The Flight into Egypt	1878	300 × 400 cm	Decoration of the archivolt of the dome of the Chapel of the Virgin in the Cathedral of La Rochelle.	La Rochelle, Cathedral	1878/03
	Charity	1878	196 × 117 cm		Private collection	1878/04
	A Soul in Heaven	1878	180 × 275 cm		Périgueux, musée du Périgord	1878/05
	The Nymphaeum	1878	143,5 × 208,5 cm		Stockton, The Pioneer & Haggin Galleries	1878/06
	Flute Player	1878	40,6 × 33 cm		Current location unknown	1878/07
	Spring Flowers	1878	119 × 57,5 cm		Current location unknown	1878/08
	Child Holding Flowers (Half‑Length)	1878	89 × 58 cm		Private collection	1878/09
	Young Girl and Child (Half‑Length)	1878	114 × 80 cm		Current location unknown	1878/10
	A Mother's Joys	1878	136 × 100,5 cm		Private collection	1878/11
	Augustine, Young Girl Holding Flowers to Her Chest	1878	60 × 48 cm		Private collection	1878/12
	Bathers	1878	99 × 68,5 cm		Tucson, Museum of Art	1878/13
	The Return from the Vintage, or Donkey‑Back Ride	1878	241 × 170 cm		Jacksonville, The Cummer Gallery of Art	1878/15
	The Little Hug	1878	114 × 81 cm		Private collection	1878/16
	Young Girl Carrying a Child	1878 (dated : 1879)	132 × 85 cm		Private collection	1878/17
	Young Gypsy Girls	1879	166 × 99 cm		Private collection	1879/01
	The Birth of Venus	1879	300 × 215 cm	Official site	Paris, musée d'Orsay	1879/02
	The Annunciation	1879	300 × 400 cm	Decoration of the archivolt of the dome of the Chapel of the Virgin in the Cathedral of La Rochelle.	La Rochelle, Cathedral	1879/03
	Child's Head	1879	37,5 × 29,5 cm		Private collection	1879/04
	The Cup of Milk	1879	71,7 × 50,4 cm		Private collection	1879/05
	By the Stream	1879	120,5 × 91,5 cm		Private collection	1879/06
	Children with the Lamb, Full‑Length	1879	129 × 96,5 cm		Current location unknown	1879/07
	Children with the Lamb, Half‑Figures	1879	61 × 46,5 cm		Private collection	1879/08
	Knitter	1879	100,5 × 60,5 cm		Ocala, Florida University, Appleton Museum of Art	1879/09
	Fortunata (Italian Girl's Head)	1879	45,5 × 38 cm	Déposé à Lexington, University of Kentucky.	Private collection	1879/10
	Rest	1879	165 × 118 cm		Cleveland, Museum of Art	1879/11
	Portrait of Mademoiselle Elizabeth Gardner	1879	46 × 38,5 cm		Tainan, Musée Chimei	1879/12
	Self‑Portrait	1879	46 × 38 cm		Montréal, musée des Beaux-Arts	1879/13
	Seated Bather	1879	64 × 41 cm		Private collection	1879/14
	Little Girl with Flowers	1879	51 × 36 cm		Current location unknown	1879/15
	Little Girl with the Blue Bowl	1879	70,5 × 50 cm		Current location unknown	1879/16
	The Chilly Girl	1879	72 × 50 cm		Private collection	1879/17
	The Crochet Work	1879	90 × 54,5 cm		Private collection	1879/18
	The Dragonfly	1879			Current location unknown	1879/19
	The Little Wounded Girl	1879	96,5 × 62 cm		Private collection	1879/20
	The Little Schoolgirl	1879	104 × 75,5 cm		Private collection	1879/21
	The Snack	1879			Current location unknown	1879/22
	Venus Surrounded by Doves	circa 1879	81,6 × 46,7 cm		Chapel Hill, Ackland Art Museum	Not catalogued

== 1880s ==
Image	Title	Date	Dimensions	Notes et références	Current location	Catalogue raisonné number (Bartoli‑Ross, 2010)
	Young Girl Defending Herself Against Love	1880	160 × 114 cm		Wilmington University of North Carolina, on deposit in Raleigh, North Carolina Museum of Art	1880/01
	Young Girl Defending Herself Against Love (Reduction)	1880	79 × 55 cm	Official site	Los Angeles, The J. Paul Getty Museum	1880/01A
	The Flagellation of Christ	1880	390 × 210 cm		La Rochelle, cathédrale Saint-Louis	1880/02
	The Fainting of the Virgin	1880	300 × 400 cm	Decoration of the archivolt of the dome of the Chapel of the Virgin in the Cathedral of La Rochelle.	La Rochelle, Chatedral	1880/03
	The Fainting of the Virgin	1880	75 × 58,5 cm		Current location unknown	1880/04
	Temptation	1880	99,5 × 132,5 cm		Minneapolis, Institute of Arts	1880/05
	Temptation (Reduction)	1880	58,5 × 79 cm		Private collection	1880/05A
	Rest (Young Girl Reclining)	1880	72,5 × 148 cm		Private collection	1880/06
	Knitter	1880	114 × 71 cm		Current location unknown	1880/07
	Little Beggar Girl	1880	117 × 74 cm		Private collection	1880/08
	The Frugal Meal	1880	132 × 87,5 cm		Private collection	1880/09
	The Difficult Lesson	1880	97 × 62 cm		Private collection	1880/10
	Milk Soup	1880	49 × 36 cm		Private collection	1880/11
	Crouching Fellah Child	1880			Current location unknown	1880/12
	Dawn	1881	215 × 107 cm		Birmingham (Alabama), Museum of Art	1881/01
	Dawn (Reduction)	1881	123 × 64 cm		Private collection	1881/01A
	Disarmed Love	1881	129,5 × 96,5 cm	Stolen while on deposit at the Wellesley College Museum. Recovered in ruined condition.	Destroyed	1881/02
	The Fisherman's Daughter	1881	114 × 79 cm		Private collection	1881/03
	The Song of the Angels	1881	213 × 152 cm		Glendale (Californie), Forest Lawn Museum	1881/04
	The Virgin with Angels	1881	113,5 × 79,5 cm		Private collection	1881/04A
	Pietà	1881	300 × 400 cm	Decoration of the archivolt of the dome of the Chapel of the Virgin in the Cathedral of La Rochelle.	La Rochelle, Cathedral	1881/05
	Child's Head	1881	41 × 33 cm		Current location unknown	1881/06
	The Nest	1881			Current location unknown	1881/07
	The Cherry Branch	1881			Private collection	1881/08
	Shepherdess	1881	117 × 72 cm		Seattle, The Frye Museum	1881/09
	Little Shepherdess Standing	1881	144 × 87,5 cm		Current location unknown	1881/10
	The Storm	1881	162,5 × 101,5 cm		New York City, Vanderbilt Foundation	1881/11
	The Bunch of Grapes	1881	117 × 84,5 cm		Current location unknown	1881/12
	The Virgin and Child with Saint John the Baptist	1881	190,5 × 111 cm		Ithaca, Cornell University, Herbert F. Johnson Museum of Art	1881/13
	Natural Fan, Young Girl and Child	1881	114 × 147 cm		Private collection	1881/14
	Natural Fan, Young Girl and Child (Reduction)	1881	59,5 × 80 cm		Private collection	1881/14A
	Dusk	1882	207,5 × 108 cm		Havana, Museo Nacional de Bellas Artes de Cuba	1882/01
	Dusk	1882	127 × 66 cm		Private collection	1882/01A
	The Nut Gatherers	1882	87,5 × 134 cm		Detroit, Institute of Arts	1882/03
	Frog Fishing	1882	142 × 111,5 cm		Private collection	1882/04
	The Knitter	1882	100,5 × 60,5 cm		Private collection	1882/05
	The Fisherman's Daughter	1882	149 × 90 cm		Private collection	1882/06
	Night	1883	208 × 108 cm		Washington, Hillwood Museum	1883/01
	Alma Parens	1883	230 × 140 cm		Private collection	1883/02
	Head of a Young Girl (Presented to Madame Membrée)	1883	46 × 38 cm		Private collection	1883/03
	Head of an Angel (Study Presented to Dr. Parrot)	1883	47 × 38,5 cm		Private collection	1883/04
	Head of an Angel (Another Study)	1883	46 × 38 cm		Private collection	1883/05
	Portrait of William, the Artist's Grandson, as Saint John the Baptist	1883	50 × 34 cm		Private collection	1883/06
	Flight of Cupids	1883	80 × 63,5 cm		Private collection	1883/07
	Orphan Girl at the Fountain	1883	145 × 87,5 cm		Private collection	1883/08
	Basket of Apples (Head and Hands)	1883	61 × 48 cm		Northampton (Massachusetts), Smith College	1883/09
	Hazelnut Harvest	1883	161 × 114 cm		Private collection	1883/10
	Little Grape Harvester	1883	117 × 82,5 cm		Private collection	1883/11
	The Youth of Bacchus	1884	331 × 610 cm		Private collection	1884/01
	The Adoration of the Shepherds	1884	350 × 220 cm	Painted for the Chapel of the Virgin in the Church of Saint‑Vincent‑de‑Paul in Paris.	Paris, Church of Saint‑Vincent‑de‑Paul	1884/02
	The Lost Star	1884	195,5 × 95 cm		Mexico, Juan Antonio Pérez Simon Foundation	1884/05
	The Lost Star (Reduction Presented to Alfred‑Henri Bramtot)	1884	57 × 27 cm		Private collection	1884/05A
	Day	1884	207 × 120,5 cm		Private collection	1884/06
	The Two Bathers	1884	201 × 129 cm		Chicago, The Art Institute	1884/07
	Crouching Bather	1884	116,5 × 90 cm		Williamstown, Sterling and Francine Clark Art Institute	1884/08
	Byblis	1884	95,5 × 159,5 cm		Hyderabad II (Andhra Pradesh), Salarjung Museum	1884/09
	Byblis (Reduction)	1884	48 × 79 cm		Private collection	1884/09A
	Rain	1884	93 × 119 cm		Private collection	1884/10
	The Difficult Lesson	1884	95 × 61 cm		Private collection	1884/11
	Knitter	1884	129 × 70 cm		Private collection	1884/12
	The Donkey	1884	137 × 101,5 cm		Pittsfield, The Berkshire Museum	1884/13
	Adornment of the Fields	1884	163 × 90 cm		Montréal, musée des Beaux-Arts	1884/14
	The Adoration of the Magi	1885	350 × 220 cm	Painted for the Chapel of the Virgin in the Church of Saint‑Vincent‑de‑Paul in Paris.	Paris, Church of Saint‑Vincent‑de‑Paul	1885/01A
	The Visitation	1885		Painted for the Chapel of the Virgin in the Church of Saint‑Vincent‑de‑Paul in Paris.	Paris, Church of Saint‑Vincent‑de‑Paul	1885/01B
	The Flight into Egypt	1885		Painted for the Chapel of the Virgin in the Church of Saint‑Vincent‑de‑Paul in Paris.	Paris, Church of Saint‑Vincent‑de‑Paul	1885/01C
	Portrait of Mademoiselle Yvonne de Chasseval	1885			Current location unknown	1885/02
	Woman and Captive Love	1885	120 × 97 cm		Private collection	1885/04
	Meditation	1885	132 × 86,5 cm		Omaha, The Joslyn Museum of Art	1885/05
	Young Girl with a Pitcher	1885	97 × 61 cm		Private collection	1885/06
	The Young Shepherdess	1885	157,5 × 72,5 cm		San Diego, Museum of Art	1885/07
	Young Girl Going to the Fountain	1885	160,5 × 73,5 cm		New York City, Dahesh Museum of Art	1885/08
	Young Girl Carrying a Pitcher	1885	157,5 × 86,5 cm		Private collection	1885/09
	Woman with a Seashell	1885	131 × 86,5 cm		Private collection	1885/10
	The Return of Spring	1886	215 × 117 cm		Omaha, The Joslyn Museum of Art	1886/01
	Portrait of a Little Girl	1886	35,5 × 27 cm		Private collection	1886/02
	Self‑Portrait Presented to Mr. Sage	1886	46 × 38 cm		Private collection	1886/03
	Portrait of Mademoiselle Ella Colonna Czosnowska	1886	155 × 85 cm		Current location unknown	1886/04
	Portrait of Mademoiselle Ruth Hill	1886			Current location unknown	1886/05
	Little Girl Sitting by the Water	1886	84 × 61,5 cm		Seattle, University of Washington, Henry Art Gallery	1886/06
	At the Foot of the Cliff	1886	108 × 65 cm		Memphis, Brooks Memorial Art Gallery	1886/07
	By the Pond	1886	106,5 × 53 cm		Private collection	1886/08
	The Ball of Wool	1886	140 × 76 cm		Private collection	1886/09
	Shepherdess	1886	160 × 76 cm		Springfield, Museum of Fine Arts	1886/10
	The Older Sister	1886	131 × 86 cm		Private collection	1886/11
	Thirst	1886	132 × 102 cm		Private collection	1886/12
	Head of a Little Girl	1886	45 × 32,5 cm		Current location unknown	1886/13
	Little Seated Knitter	1886	96 × 60,5 cm		Current location unknown	1886/14
	Love Victorious	1886	164 × 122,5 cm		Private collection	1886/15
	Portrait of Madame Dumont	1887	61 × 50 cm		Private collection	1887/01
	Portrait of Diane	1887	59,5 × 48,5 cm		Baltimore, Museum of Art	1887/02
	Going to the Bath	1887	175 × 80,5 cm		Private collection	1887/03
	Brother and Sister	1887	179 × 80 cm		Private collection	1887/04
	Young Shepherdess Standing	1887	157,5 × 73,5 cm		Private collection	1887/05
	The Morning Meal	1887	91,5 × 56 cm		Private collection	1887/06
	Bather	1888	189 × 108 cm		Private collection	1888/01
	The First Mourning	1888	203 × 252 cm		Buenos Aires, Museo Nacional de Bellas Artes	1888/02
	Seated Madonna	1888	176,5 × 103 cm		Adélaïde (Australie), Art Gallery of South Australia	1888/03
	Study of a Little Girl (Profile)	1888	24 × 18,5 cm		Private collection	1888/04
	By the Stream	1888	81 × 103 cm		Private collection	1888/05
	Love with a Butterfly	1888	117 × 68 cm		Private collection	1888/06
	Self‑Portrait	1888	93 × 61 cm		Private collection	1888/07
	Self‑Portrait (Replica)	1888	96 × 62 cm		Private collection	1888/07A
	Jeanne	1888	59 × 46,5 cm		Private collection	1888/08
	Shepherdess	1888	115,6 × 82,6 cm		Private collection	1888/09
	Little Sulker	1888	123 × 86 cm		Manitowoc (Wisconsin), Rahr-West Museum	1888/10
	Christ Meets His Mother	1888		Painted for the Chapel of the Virgin in the Church of Saint‑Vincent‑de‑Paul in Paris.	Paris, Church of Saint‑Vincent‑de‑Paul	1888/12
	The Annunciation	1888		Painted for the Chapel of the Virgin in the Church of Saint‑Vincent‑de‑Paul in Paris.	Paris, Church of Saint‑Vincent‑de‑Paul	1888/13
	The Annunciation (Reduction)	1888	93 × 48 cm		Private collection	1888/13A
	Meditation	1888	122 × 81,5 cm		Current location unknown	1888/14
	The Lesson	1889	99 × 61 cm		Private collection	1889/01
	Psyche and Love	1889	200 × 116 cm		Hobart (Tasmanie), Tasmanian Museum and Art Gallery	1889/02
	Cupid and Psyche as Children	1889	119,5 × 71 cm		Private collection	1889/03
	Whisperings of Love	1889	203 × 137 cm	Official site	La Nouvelle-Orléans, Museum of Art	1889/06
	First Daydream (Reduction)	1889	101 × 58 cm		Jacksonville (Floride), The Cummer Museum of Art	1889/06A
	Our Lady of the Angels	1889	230,5 × 134,5 cm		Private collection	1889/07
	Portrait of Madame Porter's Child	1889	96,5 × 62 cm		Private collection	1889/08
	The Afternoon Snack	1889	94 × 61 cm		Private collection	1889/09
	Young Girl Crocheting	1889	61 × 46,5 cm		Private collection	1889/10
	The Shepherdess	1889	159 × 93 cm		Tulsa (Oklahoma), The Philbrook Museum of Art	1889/11
	The Bohemian	1890	150 × 124,5 cm	Painting formerly at the Minneapolis Institute of Arts, sold by the museum in 2014.	Private collection	1889/12
	The Marriage of the Virgin	1889		Painted for the Chapel of the Virgin in the Church of Saint‑Vincent‑de‑Paul in Paris.	Paris, Church of Saint‑Vincent‑de‑Paul	1889/13
	The Virgin at the Foot of the Cross	1889		Painted for the Chapel of the Virgin in the Church of Saint‑Vincent‑de‑Paul in Paris.	Paris, Church of Saint‑Vincent‑de‑Paul	1889/14
	Portrait of Camille‑Gabrielle Drunzer	1889	43 × 37 cm		Private collection	1889/15
	Spring Songs	1889	149,5 × 99 cm		Private collection	1889/16

== 1890s ==
Image	Title	Date	Dimensions	Notes et références	Lieu de conservation	Catalogue raisonné number (Bartoli‑Ross, 2010)
	Little Beggar Girls	1890	161 × 93,5 cm		Syracuse (New York), Syracuse University Art Collection	1890/01
	A Little Coaxing	1890	145 × 91 cm		Private collection	1890/02
	The Holy Women at the Tomb	1890	260 × 160 cm		Anvers, musée royal des Beaux-Arts	1890/03
	Portrait of Mademoiselle Louise Bonynge, Future Madame Maxwell	1890	129 × 89 cm		Tokyo, Hachioji City, Mutauchi Museum	1890/04
	Love on the Lookout	1890	117 × 77 cm		Private collection	1890/05
	Portrait of Gabrielle Cot	1890	45,5 × 38 cm		Private collection	1890/06
	Innocence	1890	119 × 71 cm	Figures of angels	Christie's London, 1996	
	Head of a Little Girl (Without Hands)	1890	44,5 × 37 cm		Private collection	1890/07
	Head of a Little Girl (With Hands)	1890	46 × 37,5 cm		Private collection	1890/08
	Blackberries	1890	135 × 81 cm		Saint-Johnsbury (Vermont), Athenaeum	1890/09
	A Vocation	1890	56 × 45,5 cm		Private collection	1890/10
	The Carnation	1890			Current location unknown	1890/11
	Gleaner	1890	96,5 × 61 cm		Private collection	1890/12
	Fisherwoman	1890	158 × 89 cm		Private collection	1890/13
	Earrings	1890 (dated 1891)	121 × 77,5 cm		Private collection	1890/14
	Pandora	1891	92,5 × 64,5 cm		Private collection	1890/15
	The Broken Pitcher	1891	134,6 × 83,8 cm		San Francisco, Legion of Honor, Fine Arts Museum	1891/01
	Snack in the Fields	1891	89,5 × 65 cm		Private collection	1891/02
	Little Shepherdess	1891	155,5 × 86,5 cm		Private collection	1891/03
	Knitter	1891	97 × 61 cm		Private collection	1891/04
	Wet Love	1891	155,5 × 84,5 cm		Private collection	1891/05
	First Jewels	1891	172,5 × 111 cm		Private collection	1891/06
	The Goose Girl	1891	152,5 × 73,5 cm		Ithaca (New York), Cornell University, The Herbert F. Johnson Museum of Art	1891/07
	By the Stream	1891	131,5 × 76 cm		Havana, Museo Nacional de Bellas Artes de Cuba	1891/08
	The Shelter	1891	122 × 91,5 cm		Private collection	1891/09
	Before the Bath	1891	137 × 87 cm		Private collection	1891/10
	Before the Bath (Unfinished Replica)	1891	131,5 × 75,5 cm		Private collection	1891/10A
	Inspiration	1891	115,5 × 75 cm		Private collection	1891/11
	Meditation	1891			Current location unknown	1891/12
	The Captive	1891	131 × 77,5 cm		Toledo, Museum of Art	1891/13
	Love at Rest	1891	45 × 22,5 cm		Private collection	1891/14
	Interrupted Work	1891	162 × 100 cm		Amherst (Massachusetts), Amherst College, Mead Art Museum	1891/15
	Interrupted Work (Reduction)	1891	100 × 61 cm		Private collection	1891/15A
	The Awakening of the Heart	1892	160 × 111 cm		Private collection	1892/01
	Psyche	1892	107 × 65 cm		Private collection	1892/02
	Mary Magdalene	1892			Current location unknown	1892/03
	The Wasp Nest	1892	213 × 152,5 cm		Private collection	1892/04
	Antoinette	1892			Current location unknown	1892/05
	Portrait of Mademoiselle H. Avon	1892			Current location unknown	1892/06
	The Empty Cage	1892	119 × 76 cm		Private collection	1892/08
	Offering to Love	1893	300 × 230 cm	Shown at the 1893 Salon, then destroyed in the 1953 fire at the Jockey Club of Buenos Aires.	Destroyed	1893/01
	Offering to Love	1893	107 × 65 cm		Current location unknown	1893/02
	The Butterfly	1893	93 × 66 cm		Private collection	1893/03
	Youth	1893	189 × 123 cm		Private collection	1893/04
	The Young Worker	1893	142 × 87,5 cm		Private collection	1893/05
	Going to the Fountain	1893	95 × 58 cm		Louisville (Kentucky), J.B. Speed Museum	1893/06
	Apple Seller	1893	96,5 × 61 cm		Private collection	1893/07
	Innocence	1893	178 × 94 cm		Current location unknown	1893/08
	Innocence (Reduction)	1893	100 × 52,5 cm		Mexico, Juan Antonio Pérez Simon Foundation	1893/08A
	Daydream on the Threshold	1893			Private collection	1893/09
	The Pearl	1894	147,5 × 78,5 cm		Private collection	1894/01
	The Pearl (Second Version)	1894	140 × 80 cm		Private collection	1894/02
	Remembrance	1894	71 × 51 cm		Private collection	1894/03
	The Secret	1894	96,5 × 62 cm		Private collection	1894/04
	Turkey Keeper	1894	105,5 × 70 cm		Current location unknown	1894/05
	Love at the Thorn	1894	125,5 × 80 cm		Private collection	1894/06
	Love Stung	1894	123 × 78 cm		Current location unknown	1894/07
	The Palm	1894	100 × 57 cm		Private collection	1894/08
	The Rising	1894	95,5 × 61 cm		Private collection	1894/09
	Gleaner	1894	106,5 × 65 cm		Private collection	1894/10
	Daisies	1894	91,5 × 56 cm		Private collection	1894/11
	After the Bath	1894	155 × 86,5 cm		Private collection	1894/12
	Bacchante	1894	152,5 × 89 cm		Private collection	1894/13
	Priestess of Bacchus	1894	170 × 90 cm		Private collection	1894/14
	Daydream	1894	112 × 71 cm		Private collection	1894/15
	Young Girl and Love	1894	77 × 50 cm		Private collection	1894/16
	Portrait of Maître Adrien Huard	1894			Current location unknown	1894/17
	Self‑Portrait	1895	53 × 46 cm		Florence, Galerie des Offices	1895/01
	The Soul	1895			Current location unknown	1895/02
	The Rapture of Psyche	1895	209 × 120 cm	On long‑term loan to the University of Virginia Art Museum, Charlottesville (Virginia).	Private collection	1895/03
	Mischief	1895	95 × 59,5 cm		Private collection	1895/04
	The Snack	1895	115,5 × 70 cm		Private collection	1895/05
	In Penance	1895	131 × 77,5 cm		Private collection	1895/06
	The Iris	1895	46 × 38 cm		Princeton (New Jersey), Princeton University Art Museum	1895/07
	Pleasant Burden	1895	112 × 76 cm		Private collection	1895/08
	The Nightingale's Song	1895	148,5 × 94,5 cm		Dayton (Ohio), Art Institute	1895/09
	The Ford	1895	160 × 74 cm		Private collection	1895/10
	Shepherdess	1895	110,5 × 75,5 cm		Private collection	1895/11
	The Favorite Flower	1895	158,5 × 91,5 cm		Private collection	1895/12
	On the Beach	1895	81 × 117 cm		Private collection	1895/13
	The Reader	1895	117 × 80,5 cm		Private collection	1895/14
	The Two Sisters	1895	145 × 89 cm		Private collection	1895/15
	Self‑Portrait	1895	164 × 98 cm		Anvers, musées royaux des Beaux-Arts	1895/16
	The Spring Breeze	1895	98,5 × 65,5 cm		Private collection	1895/17
	Remembrance	1895	116 × 68,5 cm		Pittsburgh, Carnegie Museum of Art	1895/18
	Little Girl Holding Apples in Her Hands	1895	93,5 × 55 cm		Private collection	1895/21
	Portrait of Mademoiselle F.A.	1895	65 × 54 cm		Private collection	1895/22
	Portrait of Louise de Rohan‑Chabot, Countess of Cambacérès	1895	121 × 90,2 cm		Seattle, Art Museum	1895/23
	Portrait of a Young Girl	1896	46,5 × 38 cm		Private collection	1896/01
	The Plums	1896	96,5 × 61 cm		Private collection	1896/02
	The Wave	1896	117 × 157 cm		Private collection	1896/03
	Meditation	1896	100 × 74 cm		Syracuse (New York), Syracuse University Art Collection	1896/04
	Daydream	1896			Current location unknown	1896/05
	Secrets of Love	1896	130 × 91,5 cm		Private collection	1896/06
	On the Watch	1896	130 × 81 cm		San Antonio, Museum of Art	1896/07
	On the Watch (Head)	1896			Current location unknown	1896/08
	Little Girl with a Bouquet	1896	66 × 54,5 cm		Private collection	1896/09
	Yvonne	1896	87,5 × 54,5 cm		Private collection	1896/10
	Sisters on the Shore	1896	142,2 × 91,4 cm		Détroit, Institute of Arts	1896/11
	A Vocation	1896	104 × 71 cm		Cleveland, Museum of Art	1896/13
	April Smile	1896			Private collection	1896/14
	Wounds of Love	1897	192 × 114,5 cm		Private collection	1897/01
	Compassion!	1897	261 × 120 cm		Paris, musée d'Orsay	1897/02
	The Lambs	1897	182 × 92 cm		Private collection	1897/03
	The Lambs	1897	116 × 79 cm		Shawnee (Oklahoma), Mabee-Gerrer Museum	1897/04
	Irene	1897	46 × 38 cm		Private collection	1897/05
	The Apples	1897	65 × 51,5 cm		Madison (Wisconsin), University of Wisconsin-Madison, Chazen Museum of Art	1897/06
	At the Fountain	1897	142 × 86,5 cm		Private collection	1897/08
	The Harvest	1897	136 × 90 cm		Current location unknown	1897/09
	Admiration	1897	147 × 200 cm		San Antonio, Museum of Art	1897/10
	Little Friends	1898	131 × 85 cm		Londres, collection Fortnum & Mason	1898/01
	Frugal Snack	1898	89,5 × 56 cm		Current location unknown	1898/02
	The Assault	1898	155,8 × 106,2 cm		Paris, musée d'Orsay	1898/03
	Inspiration	1898	100 × 66 cm		Private collection	1898/04
	The Narcissus	1898	46 × 38 cm		Varsovie, musée de l'Archidiocèse	1898/05
	The Dream	1898	100 × 69 cm		Private collection	1898/06
	Reflection	1898	117 × 73 cm		Private collection	1898/07
	The Veil	1898	115 × 80 cm		Private collection	1898/08
	Portrait of a Young Girl	1898	39,5 × 32 cm		Private collection	1898/09
	The Seamstress	1898	115,5 × 71 cm		Private collection	1898/10
	The Lunch	1898	95 × 51 cm		Current location unknown	1898/11
	Return from the Fields	1898	128 × 71 cm		Private collection	1898/12
	The Knitter	1898	95 × 58 cm		Manchester, City Art Gallery	1898/13
	The Reverence	1898	138 × 74,5 cm		Private collection	1898/14
	The Two Sisters	1899	144 × 77 cm		Private collection	1899/01
	Love and Psyche	1899	220 × 128 cm		Private collection	1899/02
	Pain of Love	1899	163 × 102 cm		Private collection	1899/03
	Bacchante	1899	100 × 70,5 cm		Private collection	1899/04
	Mimosa	1899	46,5 × 38 cm		Current location unknown	1899/05
	The Lemon Seller	1899	66 × 50 cm		Jérusalem, The Israël Museum	1899/06
	The Lemon	1899	45,5 × 35,5 cm		Current location unknown	1899/07
	Ray of Sunlight	1899	127 × 70 cm		Current location unknown	1899/08
	The Wallflowers	1899	71,5 × 58,5 cm		Private collection	1899/09
	The Angel (Head)	1899	47 × 38 cm		Béziers, musée des Beaux-Arts	1899/10
	The Thistle	1899	140 × 72,5 cm		Current location unknown	1899/11
	The Mischievous Girl	1899	132 × 72,5 cm		Détroit, Institute of Arts	1899/12
	Daydream	1899	112 × 76 cm		Current location unknown	1899/13
	Frugal Snack	1899	113 × 62 cm		Private collection	1899/14
	The Virgin of the Lilies	1899	115,5 × 81 cm		Private collection	1899/15

== 1900s ==
Image	Title	Date	Dimensions	Notes	Lieu de conservation	Catalogue raisonné number (Bartoli‑Ross, 2010)
	The Young Brother	1900	100 × 73 cm		Private collection	1900/01
	Queen of the Angels	1900	285 × 185 cm	Paris Musées	Paris, musée du Petit-Palais	1900/02
	A Moment of Rest	1900	149,5 × 72,5 cm		Private collection	1900/03
	Childhood Idyll	1900	102 × 130 cm		Denver, Art Museum	1900/04
	Laurel Branch	1900	115,5 × 70 cm		Private collection	1900/05
	Inspiration	1900			Current location unknown	1900/06
	Love Hovering over the Waters	1900	170 × 103,5 cm		Private collection	1900/07
	The Plums	1900	106,7 × 96,5 cm		Private collection	1900/08
	Little Marauder	1900	124 × 73,5 cm		Private collection	1900/09
	Marguerite	1900	95 × 60 cm		Private collection	1900/10
	Before the Bath	1900	134,5 × 75 cm		Private collection	1900/11
	Portrait of Madame Victor Olry Roederer, née Mathilde Mitre	1900	196 × 108 cm		Reims, Champagne Roederer	1900/12
	Portrait of Marius Vachon	1900	46 × 38 cm		Private collection	1900/13
	Two Sisters	1901	110,5 × 78,5 cm		Appleton (Wisconsin), Lawrence University	1901/01
	The Lazy Girl	1901	157,5 × 78,5 cm		Current location unknown	1901/02
	A Dream of Spring	1901	185,5 × 131 cm		Indianapolis, Museum of Art	1901/03
	Tender Words	1901	190,5 × 122 cm		Winter Park (Floride), Rollins Museum of Art	1901/04
	Love Takes Flight	1901	170 × 112 cm		Seattle, Frye Art Museum	1901/05
	Maternal Solicitude	1901	155 × 81 cm		Private collection	1901/06
	The Prize Book	1901	115 × 67 cm		Private collection	1901/07
	The Snack	1901	88,5 × 55,8 cm		Private collection	1901/08
	Yvonne on the Doorstep	1901	95,5 × 63 cm		Private collection	1901/09
	Knitter	1901	90 × 54,5 cm		Private collection	1901/10
	The Waiting	1901	124,5 × 65 cm		Private collection	1901/11
	The Oreads	1902	237,5 × 181,5 cm		Paris, musée d'Orsay	1902/01
	Modesty	1902	160,5 × 72,5 cm		Private collection	1902/02
	The Young Brother	1902	137 × 93 cm		Richmond, Virginia Museum of Art	1902/03
	Young Priestess	1902	181 × 81 cm		Rochester (New York), Memorial Art Gallery	1902/04
	The Waiting	1902	117 × 65,5 cm		Private collection	1902/05
	In the Mountains, or Woman with Thistles	1902	116 × 73,5 cm		Private collection	1902/06
	Portrait of Mademoiselle X X	1902	46,5 × 38,5 cm		Private collection	1902/07
	By the Sea	1903	95 × 61 cm		Private collection	1903/01
	The Wave	1903	80 × 174 cm		Private collection	1903/02
	The Virgin with the Lamb	1903	116 cm de diamètre		Private collection	1903/03
	Admiration of Love	1903	46 × 38 cm		Current location unknown	1903/04
	The Madonna with Roses	1903	132 × 89 cm		Tarrytown (New York), Lyndhurst Castle, Jay Gould Museum	1903/05
	Ora Pro Nobis	1903	115 × 74,5 cm		Current location unknown	1903/06
	Spring	1903	195,5 × 106,5 cm		Private collection	1903/07
	The Daisies	1903	114,5 × 71 cm		Private collection	1903/08
	Little Girl Sitting and Embroidering	1903	128 × 66 cm		Private collection	1903/09
	The Bunch of Grapes	1903			Current location unknown	1903/10
	A Dryad	1904	125 × 115 cm		Private collection	1904/01
	Roman Beauty	1904	180,5 × 81 cm		Mexico, Fondation Juan Antonio Pérez Simon	1904/02
	Love at Rest	1904	93 × 64 cm		Private collection	1904/03
	Far niente	1904	120,5 × 76 cm		Private collection	1904/04
	The Oceanid	1904	96 × 205 cm		La Rochelle, musée des Beaux-Arts	1904/05
	Daydream	1904	116 × 81 cm		Jacksonville (Floride), The Cummer Museum of Arts	1904/06
	Meditation	1904	91,5 × 64,5 cm		Manchester (New Hampshire), Currier Gallery of Art	1904/07
	The Gladiolus	1904	106 × 71 cm		Mobile (Alabama), Museum of Art	1904/08
	Madonna	1905	81,5 × 65 cm		Private collection	1905/01
	Reflection	1905	100,5 × 81 cm		Private collection	1905/02
	In the Woods	1905	162,5 × 94 cm	Shown at the 1905 Salon, reproduced in L’Illustration no. 3244, 19 April 1905.	Seattle, Frye Art Museum	1905/03
	The Fruit Basket	1905	110,5 × 77 cm		Private collection	1905/04
	The Sprig of Broom	1905	87,5 × 58 cm		Private collection	1905/06
	Young Girl Sitting and Holding an Apple	1905	88,9 × 57,8 cm		Dallas, Museum of Art	1905/07
	Meditation	1905	105,5 × 71 cm		Current location unknown	1905/08

== See also ==
=== Bibliography ===
- Damien Bartoli; Ross, Frederick C. (2010). William Bouguereau. Vol. 2. New York: Antique Collectors' Club / Art Renewal Center..
- Catalogue illustré des œuvres de W. Bouchereau. Artistes modernes. Paris: L. Baschet. 1885. p. 184..

=== Related articles ===
- William-Adolphe Bouguereau
