= Noisette =

Noisette (which means hazelnut in French) can refer to:

- A small round piece of lean meat, especially lamb
- Beurre noisette, browned butter used in cooking
- Sauce noisette, a type of Hollandaise sauce made with browned butter
- A chocolate made with hazelnuts
- Antoine Noisette, French botanist, brother of Louis Claude and Philippe
- Louis Claude Noisette, French botanist, brother of Antoine and Philippe
- Philippe Noisette, French-American horticulturist, brother of Antoine and Louis Claude, who introduced the first rose of the Noisette group, Rosa 'Blush Noisette' in 1815
- La Noisette, a former restaurant in London
- Noisettes, a British musical group
- Noisette, a 2000 album by Soft Machine
- The Noisette roses, a group of garden roses
- Les Noisettes, or The Nut Gatherers, a painting by William-Adolphe Bouguereau
- Noisette, a character from Pizza Tower
