= La Vierge au lys =

Painting by William-Adolphe Bouguereau

The Virgin of the Lilies
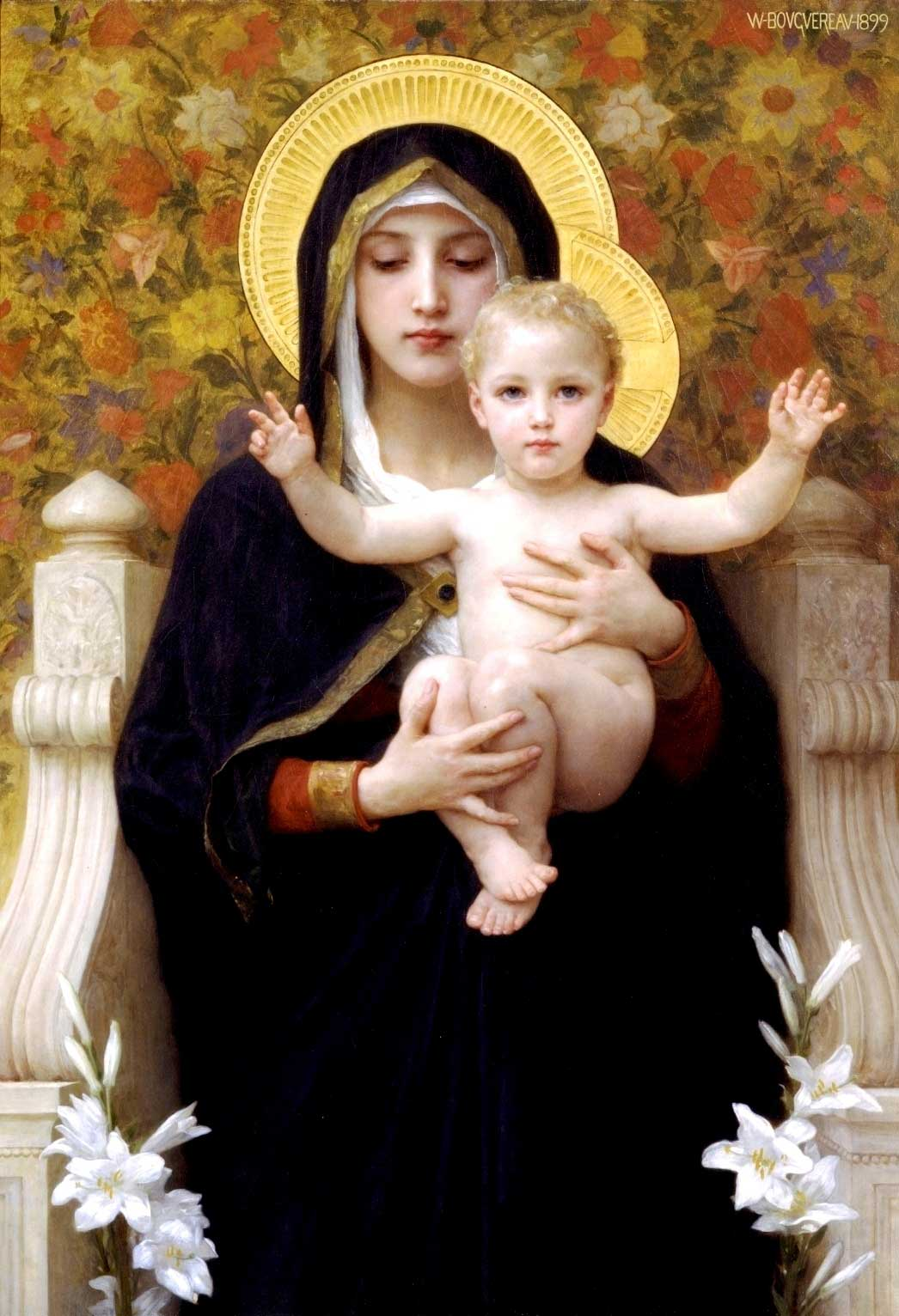
- Artist: William-Adolphe Bouguereau
- Year: 1899
- Medium: Oil on canvas
- Dimensions: 27 cm × 18.5 cm (11 in × 7.3 in)

The Virgin of the Lilies (French: La Vierge au lys), also known as The Madonna of the Lilies, is an 1899 oil painting by the French artist William-Adolphe Bouguereau, now owned by a private owner. Its dimensions are 27 × 18.5 cm.

== Description ==
The Virgin Mary is depicted in a seated position, perhaps on the Throne of Wisdom. She is carrying the Christ Child whose arms are stretched out, as if giving a blessing. Lilies are used to symbolise Mary's purity and innocence, and thus are regularly depicted with her, especially during paintings of the Annunciation.

== Similarities with other paintings ==
The poses of Mary and Jesus match the painting Queen of the Angels, another painting by Bouguereau of a similar theme.

The position of the halos also mirror the painting Pieta, the only difference being the age and facial expressions of Mary and Jesus.
