= Quiescence =

Quiescence (/kwiˈɛsəns/) is a state of quietness or inactivity. It may refer to:

- Quiescence search, in game tree searching (adversarial search) in artificial intelligence, a quiescent state is one in which a game is considered stable and unlikely to change drastically the next few plays
- Seed dormancy, a form of delayed seed germination
- Quiescence, a type of dormancy in trees
- Quiescent phase, the first part of the first stage of childbirth
- The G_{0} phase of a cell in the cell cycle; quiescence is the state of a cell when it is not dividing
- Quiescent current (biasing) in an electronic circuit
- Quiescent consistency is one of the safety properties for concurrent data structures

== See also ==
- Rest (disambiguation)
