= Rest =

Rest or REST may refer to:

== Relief from activity ==
- Sleep
  - Bed rest
- Break (work)
- Kneeling
- Lying (position)
- Sitting
- Squatting position

== Structural support ==
- Structural support
  - Rest (cue sports)
  - Armrest
  - Headrest
  - Footrest

== Arts and entertainment ==
=== Music ===
- Rest (music), a silence in a piece of music
- Rest (Gregor Samsa album), 2008
- Rest (Charlotte Gainsbourg album), 2017
- "Rest", a 2023 song by Foo Fighters from But Here We Are
- "Rest", a 1990 song by Green Day from 39/Smooth
- "Rest", a 2014 song by Kutless from Glory
- "Rest", a 2015 song by Matt Maher from Saints and Sinners
- "Rest", a 2012 song by Michael Kiwanuka from Home Again
- "Rest", a 2000 song by Skillet from Invincible
- "Rest", a 2009 song by The Temper Trap from Conditions
- "Rest", tune name for a setting of "Dear Lord and Father of Mankind"

=== Painting ===
- Repose (painting), by Manet, c.1871
- Le Repos (Picasso), 1932
- Rest (Bouguereau), 1879

== Businesses and organizations ==
- Relief Society of Tigray, an NGO in Ethiopia
- Rest Super, an Australian industry superannuation fund

== Places ==
- Rest, Kansas, U.S.
- Rest, Virginia, U.S.

== Science and technology ==
- Representational State Transfer (REST or RESTful), architectural style for APIs
- Restricted Environmental Stimulation Technique, the deliberate reduction or removal of stimuli from one or more of the senses
- reStructuredText, a lightweight markup language for Python
- RE1-silencing transcription factor, a protein encoded by the REST gene

== Other uses ==
- Rest (finance), a financial terminology
- Rest (physics), related to inertia
- Revised Extended Standard Theory, a theory of linguistic competence developed by Noam Chomsky
- James Rest (died 1999), American psychologist

== See also ==
- Restaurant (disambiguation)
- Rest stop (disambiguation)
- Death
- Leisure
- Relaxation technique
