= Resting Museum =

Indian artist duo

Resting Museum (established in 2022, India) is an artistic duo founded by Priyanka D'Souza and Shreyasi Pathak. Resting Museum aims to bring rest to art history, archival and museum studies discourse. It uses Critical disability studies and Queer studies as methodologies, by invoking crip and queer time to centre rest, particularly in the arts, while looking at the aesthetics of the incomplete and the missing body. Their work examines the role of shared resting practices in community formation.
