= Louis Claude Noisette =

French botanist (1772–1849)

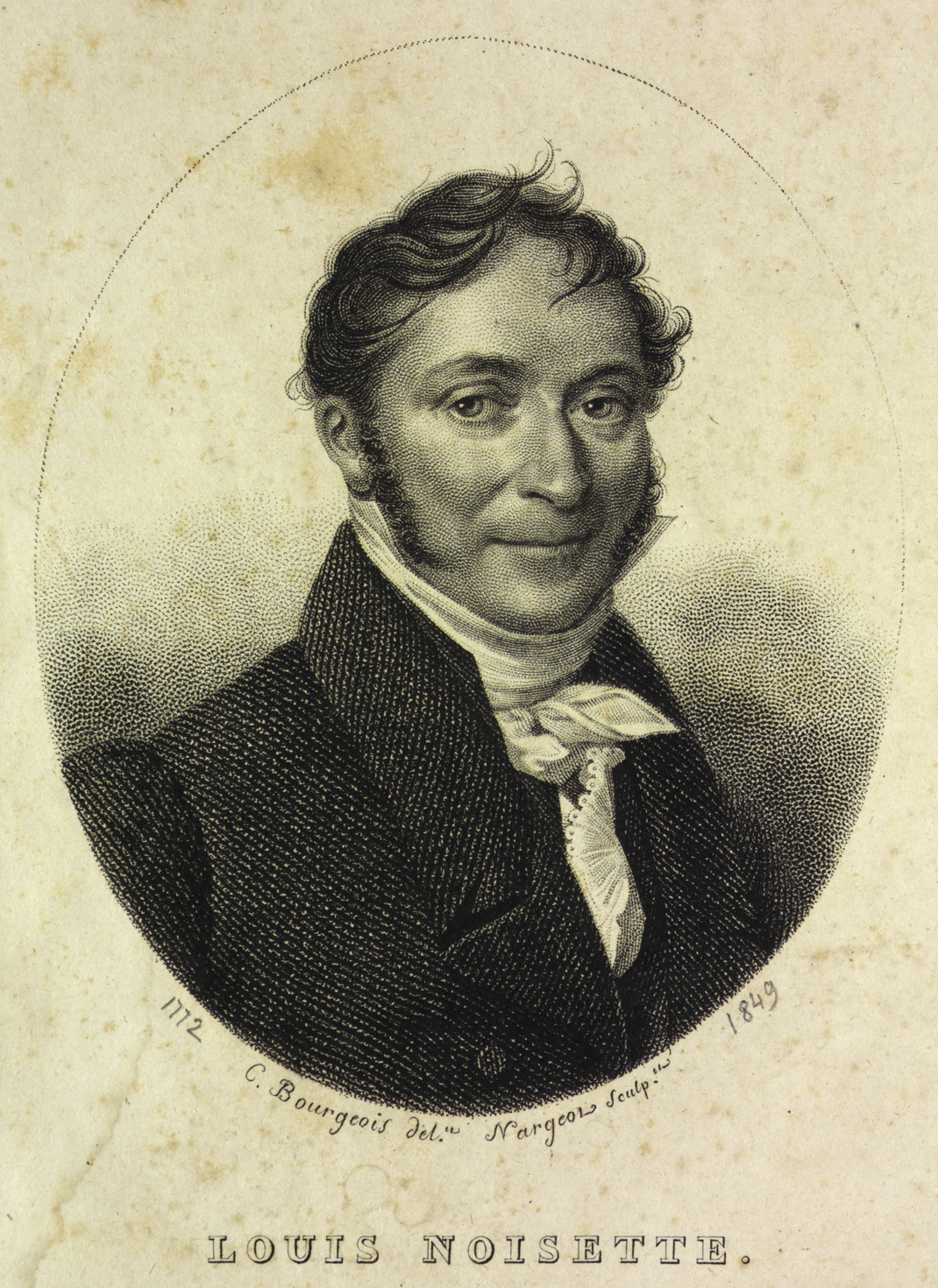
- Undated engraving of Noisette
- Born: 2 November 1772; Châtillon, France
- Died: 9 January 1849 (aged 76); Paris, France
- Scientific career
- Fields: Botany, horticulture, and agronomy
- Author abbrev. (botany): Nois.

Louis Claude Noisette (2 November 1772 – 9 January 1849) was a French horticulturist and botanist known for his contribution to the cultivation and hybridization of plants, especially roses. He is the author of Le Jardin Fruitier, a guide on the cultivation and history of fruit trees with illustrations by Pancrace Bessa.

== Life and career ==
Noisette was born in Châtillon, a suburb of Paris, France, to an unnamed mother and his father Joseph Noisette, the head gardener to the Count of Provence (later King Louis XVIII). Noisette had two brothers: Antoine Noisette, a botanist who managed the botanical garden in Nantes, France, and Philippe Noisette, an important figure in the American horticulture scene.

After studying at the Jardin des plantes (Paris), Noisette began his career in the French military infantry. He worked there for two years before moving into horticulture at the age of 23.

He took over the Val-de-Grâce Botanical School after his military service, but it closed down after a few years. From 1795–1798, he was a gardener at Val-de-Grâce. In 1806, he, along with his brothers, set up a botanical facility where they grew a wide variety of plants, with a focus on roses.

Noisette died on 9 January 1849, at the age of 76.

== The Noisette Rose ==
Noisette is known for his role in developing the Noisette rose (Rosa x Noisettiana). This hybrid rose originated from seeds sent to him by his brother Philippe from South Carolina. Philippe had crossed an 'Old Blush' plant obtained from Louis Claude Richard, with Rosa moschata, resulting in 'Champneys' Pink Cluster'. Louis Noisette subsequently created 'Blush Noisette', the first Noisette rose, by sowing seeds of 'Champney's Pink Cluster'.

== Contributions and recognition ==
Noisette introduced and distributed rare American plants and Indian plants to France. His contributions were recognized in 1840 when he was awarded with the Chevalier of the Legion of Honor.

Nikolaus II, Prince Esterházy commissioned him to landscape his estate in Austria.

The genus Noisettia, a small flowering plant native to tropical America, was named in his honor.

His publication “Le Jardin Fruitier" (1821), which consisted of 90 hand-coloured engravings of fruit trees, is a source on the cultivation, history, and uses of fruit trees.
