= The Knitting Girl =

Painting by William-Adolphe Bouguereau

- La Couseuse (French)
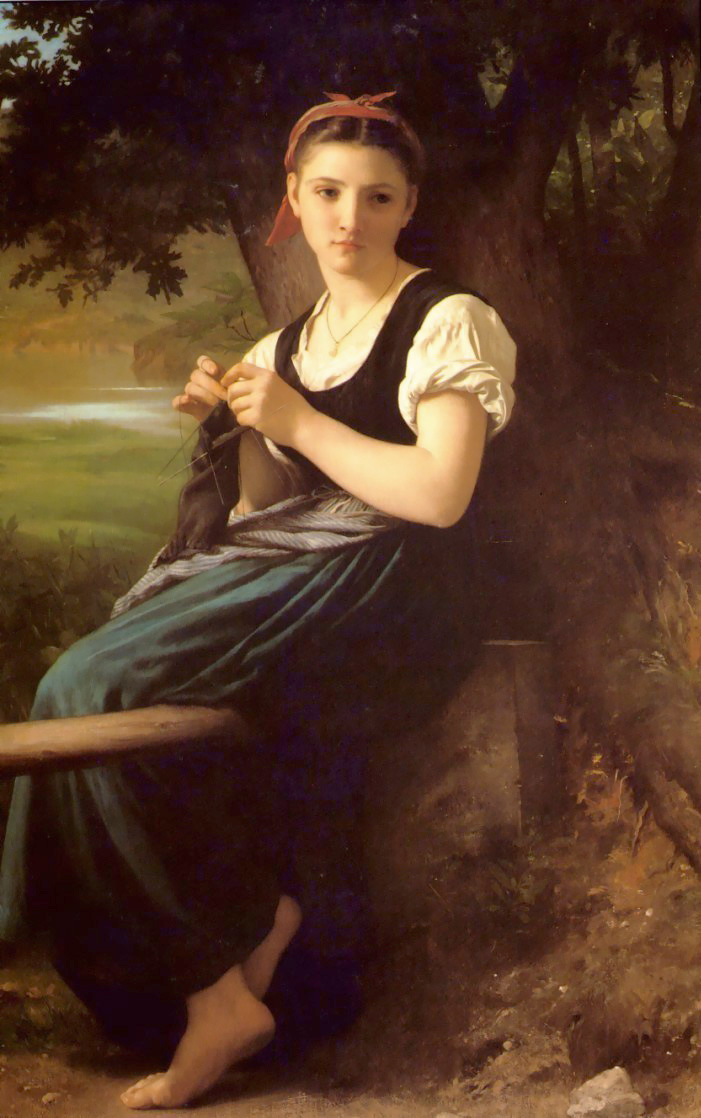
- The Knitting Girl (1869)
- Artist: William-Adolphe Bouguereau
- Year: 1869
- Medium: Oil on canvas
- Dimensions: 145 cm × 99 cm (57 in × 39 in)
- Location: Joslyn Art Museum, Omaha

The Knitting Girl (French: La Couseuse) is an oil-on-canvas painting executed in 1869 by the French academic artist William-Adolphe Bouguereau. It is currently held in the Joslyn Art Museum in Omaha, Nebraska, in the United States.

== See also ==
- William-Adolphe Bouguereau gallery
