= Breton Brother and Sister =

1871 painting by William Bouguereau

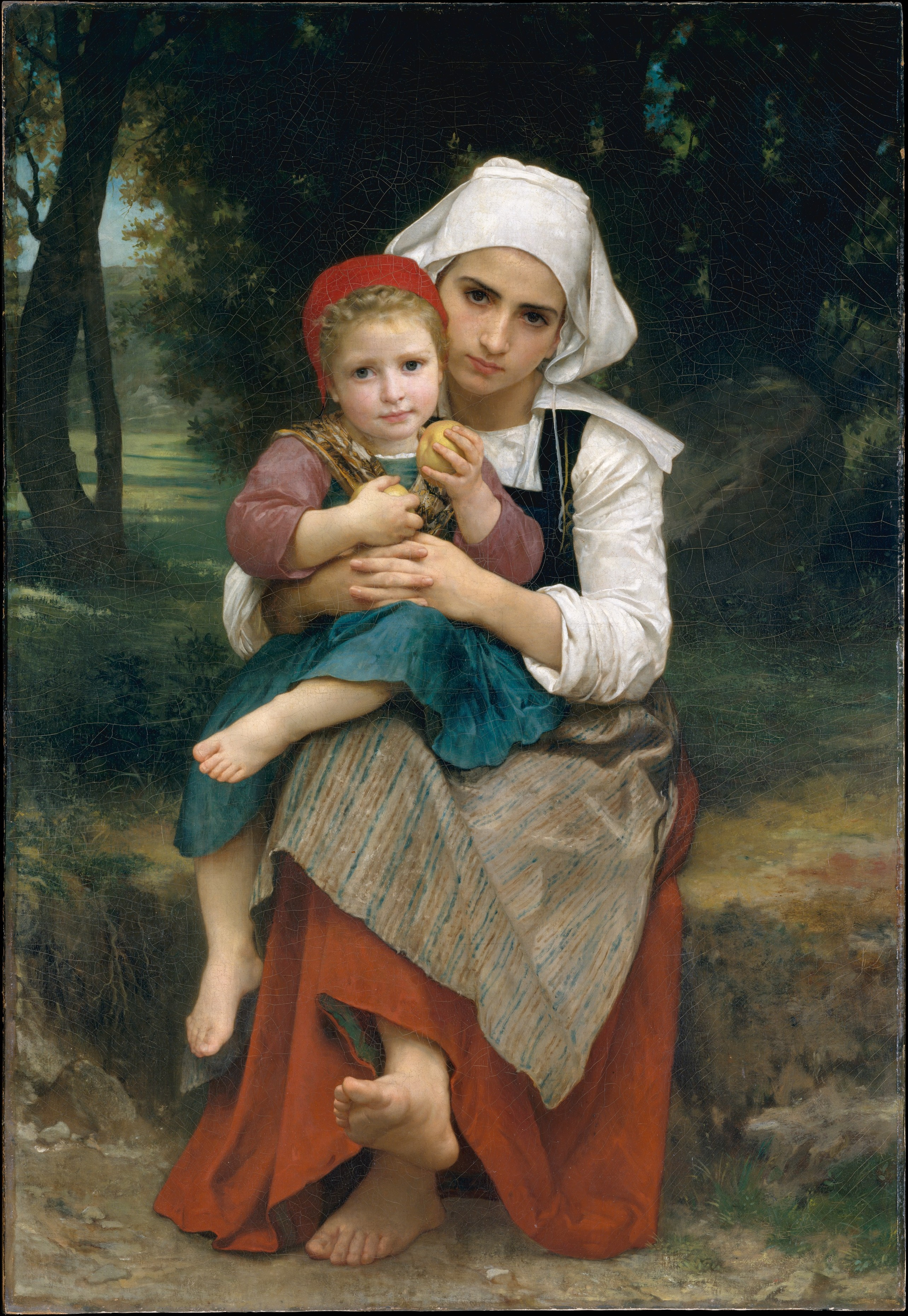
- Artist: William Bouguereau
- Year: 1871
- Medium: Oil on canvas
- Dimensions: 129.2 cm × 89.2 cm (50.9 in × 35.1 in)
- Location: Metropolitan Museum of Art; New York City
- Accession: 87.15.32

Breton Brother and Sister is a mid 19th-century painting by French artist William Bouguereau. Done in oil on canvas, the painting depicts a trousered toddler Breton brother and his older, taller, sister in traditional costume. The work – though painted in 1871 – was created on the basis of sketches Bouguereau made in the late 1860s while vacationing in Brittany. The work is in the collection of the Metropolitan Museum of Art.
