= Maternal Admiration =

1869 painting by William-Adolphe Bouguereau

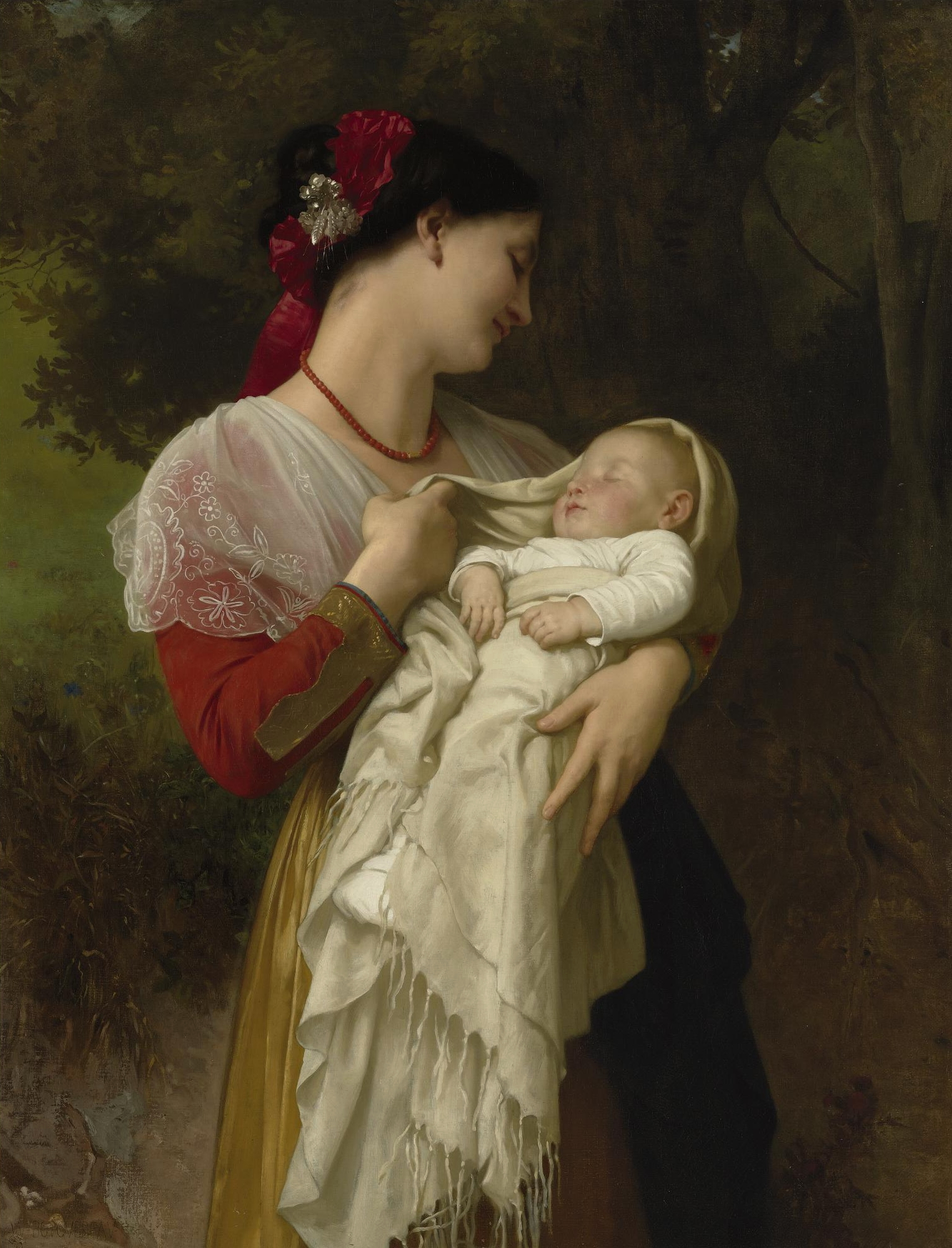
- Artist: William-Adolphe Bouguereau
- Year: 1869
- Medium: Oil on canvas
- Dimensions: 116 cm × 89 cm (46 in × 35 in)
- Location: Private collection

Maternal Admiration (French: Admiration maternelle) is an oil painting by the French artist William-Adolphe Bouguereau, painted in 1869, and now owned by a private collector. Its dimensions are 116 × 89 cm.
