= The Broken Pitcher (painting) =

1891 painting by William-Adolphe Bouguereau

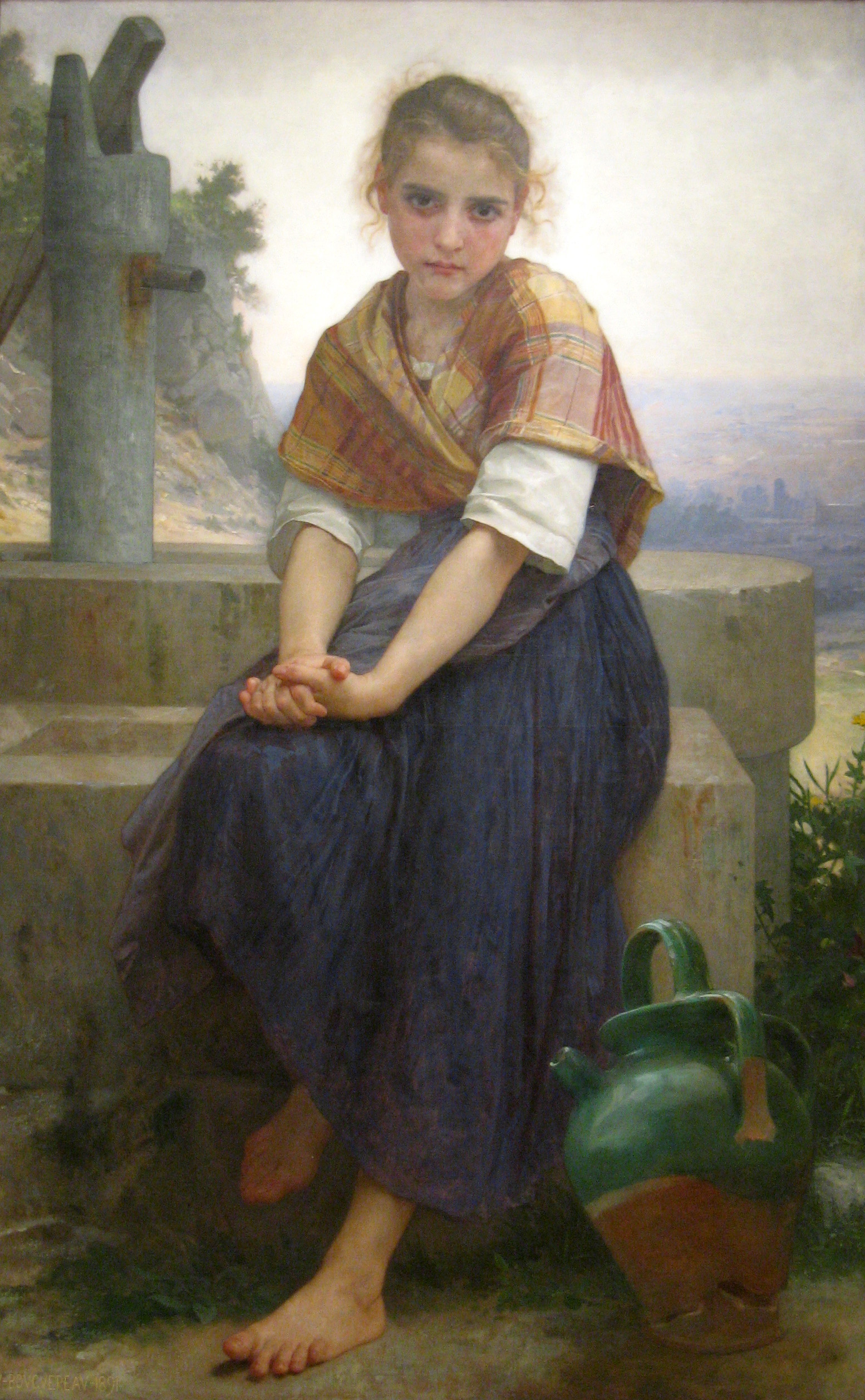
- The Broken Pitcher
- Artist: William-Adolphe Bouguereau
- Year: 1891
- Medium: Oil on canvas
- Dimensions: 53 x 33 in. (134.6 x 83.8 cm)
- Accession: 53162

The Broken Pitcher is the artwork of French artist William-Adolphe Bouguereau. The painting was completed in 1891. It was the first artwork of William-Adolphe Bouguereau to arrive in California when it was acquired by the de Youngs in 1893. The painting is the symbol of the loss of virginity. In this picture of a young girl with a blue skirt and white shirt covered by a red cloth, she sits beside the broken pitcher. This work is in the Masterworks of European Painting in the Legion of Honor (1999).
