= Rest stop (disambiguation) =

Rest stop is a rest area for motorists.

Rest stop may also refer to:

- Rest Stop (film), a 2006 horror film
  - Rest Stop: Don't Look Back, the 2006 sequel to Rest Stop
- "Rest Stop" (short story), a 2003 short story by Stephen King
- "Rest Stop", a 2000 song by Matchbox Twenty from Mad Season
