= Antoine Noisette =

- Born: 1778; Torcy
- Died: 21 August 1858; Nantes

Antoine Noisette (1778 – 21 August 1858) was a French botanist who managed the botanical garden in Nantes, France, and a landscape architect, horticulturist and naturalist, brother of Louis Claude. With another brother, Philippe Stanislas, who emigrated to Charleston, South Carolina, he is credited with introducing the Noisette group of garden roses to horticulture. Joseph Noisette, their father, was gardener to the Count of Provence, the future king Louis XVIII of France.

== Career ==
In the spring of 1822, the mayor of Nantes, Louis-Hyacinthe Levesque, made initial contact with Noisette, a renowned Parisian landscape architect, to ask him to create a botanical garden at Nantes, and in October Noisette agreed to take charge of the work. In addition to a comfortable salary and official accommodation, he enjoyed a considerable advantage, the possibility of selling surplus plants for his own profit.

In 1833, the city of Nantes decided not to renew Noisette's contract and following a report submitted to Mayor Ferdinand Favre by an oversight committee in June 1835, Noisette left his position as director of the garden in September, but not before securing the appointment of his son, Dominique, as head gardener.

== Legacy ==
A street in Nantes, in the Doulon-Bottière district was named rue Antoine-Noisette.

Noisette is buried in the Saint-Donatien Cemetery, adjoining the Basilica of Saint-Donatien, with his wife Jeanne Beauvais. In the church, a Noisette rose and a hazel branch are depicted on a keystone.
