= A Little Coaxing =

1890 painting by William-Adolphe Bouguereau

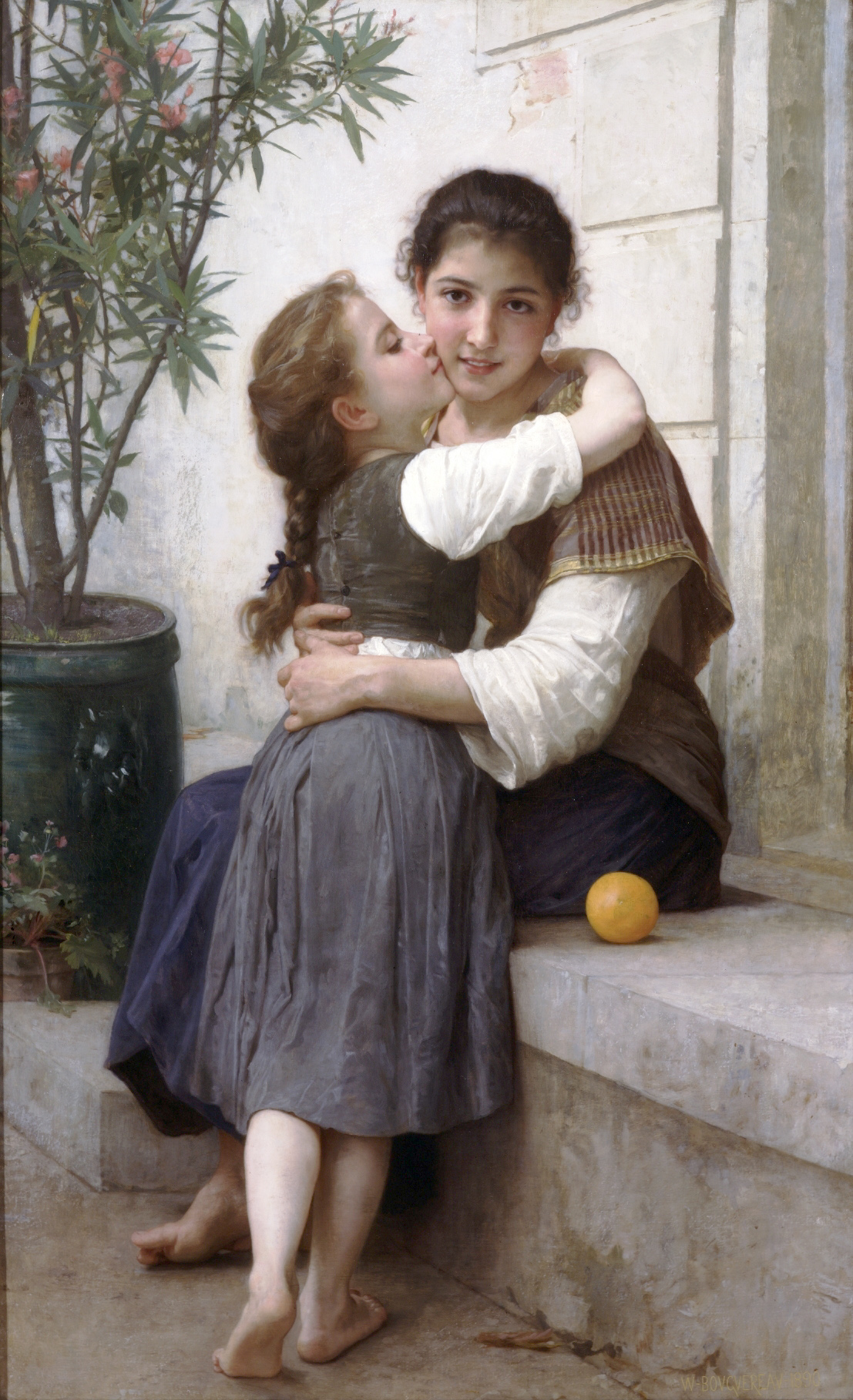
- Artist: William-Adolphe Bouguereau
- Year: 1890
- Medium: Oil on canvas
- Dimensions: 145 cm × 91 cm (57 in × 36 in)

A Little Coaxing (French: Câlinerie) is an oil painting by the French artist William-Adolphe Bouguereau, painted and completed in 1890, and now owned by a private collector.

It depicts two barefooted sisters, the older girl sitting on a concrete step beside an unpeeled orange and the younger sister giving her a kiss on the cheek.
