= Rest (finance) =

Rest is a financial terminology, describing the frequency in which an outstanding loan amount is being calculated. Usually the more frequently the outstanding amount is calculated the less the total interest over the entire duration of the loan will be.
