= Pietà (Bouguereau) =

1876 painting by William-Adolphe Bouguereau

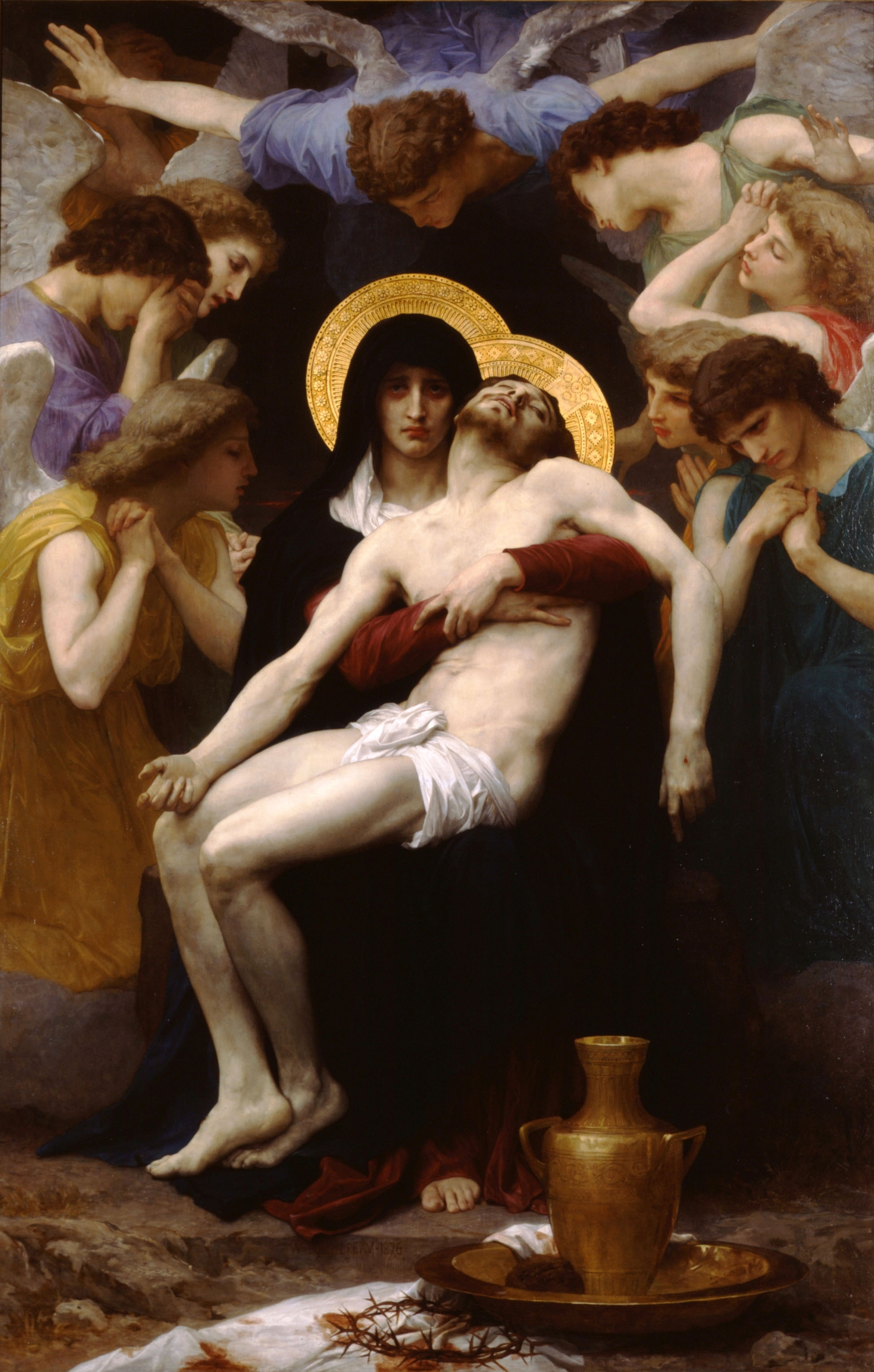
- Artist: William-Adolphe Bouguereau
- Year: 1876
- Medium: Oil on canvas
- Dimensions: 223 cm × 149 cm (91 in × 59 in)
- Location: Private Collection, Unknown

Pietà is an oil on canvas painting made in 1876 by the French artist William-Adolphe Bouguereau, depicting the Pietà. It measures 230 by 148 centimetres (91 x 58 in) and is held in a private collection.

== Description ==
The Pietà is a theme in Christian art showing the Virgin Mary holding the dead body of her son, Jesus, after His crucifixion. In Bouguereau's version, Mary sits at the centre. She wears a heavy black cloak that covers her entire body, leaving only her pale face and clasped hands visible. Her expression is one of quiet sorrow, and she looks down at the body of Christ stretched across her lap. Christ's body is painted with academic smoothness, showing the wounds on His hands and feet.

Nine angels form a semicircle behind Mary and Jesus. Their large, feathered wings overlap one another, and they bow their heads in silent mourning. Each angel is dressed in a robe of a different colour, moving through the colours of the rainbow. At the bottom of the painting, a crown of thorns and a white cloth stained with the blood of Christ lie on the ground. To the right is a stone urn bearing the Latin inscription IN MEMORIAM DILECTI MEI FILII GEORGII DIE XIX JULII ANNO MDCCCLXXV. The inscription translates to "In memory of my beloved son, Georges, on 19 July 1875."

== Symbolism ==
The rainbow-like arrangement of the angels' robes is interpreted as a reference to the Old Testament story of Noah's Ark. After the great flood, God placed a rainbow in the sky as a promise that the world would not be destroyed again and as a sign of hope for a new beginning. In the painting, the rainbow of angel robes suggests that the suffering of Jesus has ended and that a new covenant between God and humanity is being established.

The crown of thorns and bloodied cloth recall the instruments of the Passion. They ground the heavenly scene with reminders of earthly pain. The stone urn engraved with a personal dedication is a funerary symbol, linking Christ's death directly to the death of Bouguereau's own son. Mary's black cloak represents deep mourning, while the luminous skin of Christ points to the resurrection.

== Background ==
Bouguereau's eldest son, Georges, died on 19 July 1875 at the age of sixteen. Overcome with grief, the artist channelled his sorrow into this work, which he completed the following year. The painting is widely seen as a personal memorial. Just as the Virgin Mary holds her dead son, Bouguereau commemorates his own son Georges through the sacred scene. By inserting the dedicatory urn into the composition, he made the personal loss a visible part of a universal religious story.

== Exhibition and provenance ==
The painting was first exhibited at the Paris Salon in 1876, where it drew considerable attention as a major religious work by an established academic master. It remained in the Bouguereau family for generations until it was sold at auction. On 24 May 2006, Christie's New York offered the painting as lot 55 in an auction of 19th-century European art. It sold for 2,416,000 US dollars, surpassing its high estimate. The buyer was a private collector, and the painting remains in a private collection today.

== Reception ==
Contemporary critics at the 1876 Salon praised the painting's technical perfection and its emotional restraint. While Bouguereau's religious works were sometimes seen as too polished, this canvas was recognised as deeply sincere because of the personal tragedy behind it. Modern scholars often describe the Pietà as one of the artist's most moving works, a fusion of academic precision and private grief.

== See also ==
- Pietà (Michelangelo)
