= Rest (Bouguereau) =

1879 painting by William-Adolphe Bouguereau

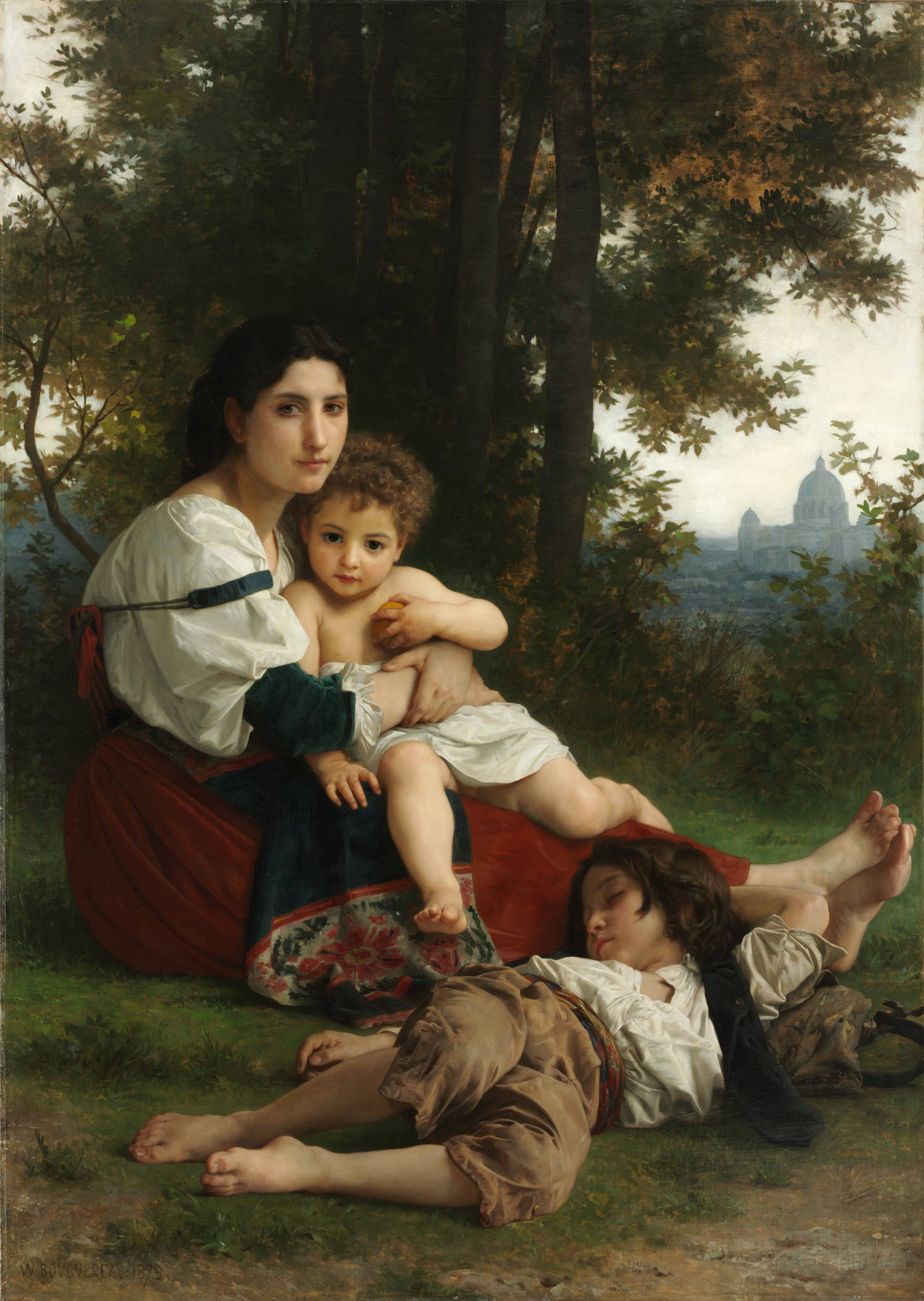
- Artist: William-Adolphe Bouguereau
- Year: 1879
- Medium: oil on fabric
- Dimensions: 164.5 cm × 117.8 cm (64.8 in × 46.4 in)
- Location: Cleveland Museum of Art, Ohio

Rest is an oil-on-canvas painting of 1879 by the French academic artist William-Adolphe Bouguereau. It is now in the Cleveland Museum of Art. It depicts a young mother with her children in the shade of a tree, with the dome of St Peter's Basilica in Rome in the background. The composition recalls paintings of the Holy Family by Raphael. The work is signed at the bottom left.

The painting was bought from the artist by Hinman Hurlbut.
