= Rosa 'Blush Noisette' =

Rose cultivar

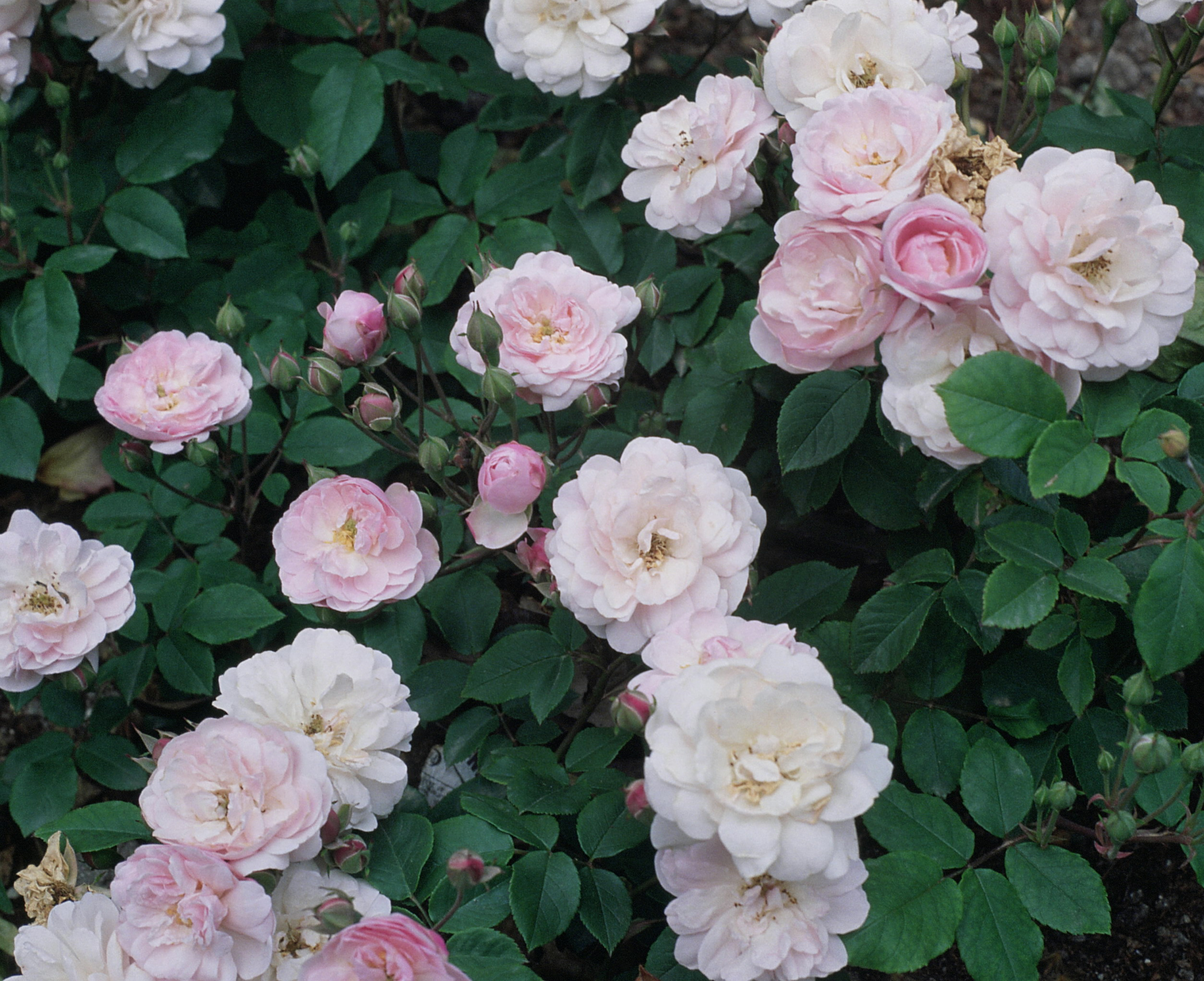
- Hybrid parentage: 'Champney's Pink Cluster' × unknown
- Cultivar group: Noisette
- Cultivar: Blush Noisette
- Marketing names: Rosa noisettaeana, 'Noisette de l'Inde, 'Noisette Carnée'
- Origin: Phillipe Noisette, pre-1814 (South Carolina, USA)

Rosa 'Blush Noisette' is a light pink Noisette rose introduced by Phillipe Noisette (Charleston, South Carolina) around 1815. It was one of the first Noisette roses, and over time has been called by a multitude of names, including Rosa × noisettiana, 'Rosier de Philippe Noisette', 'Noisette de l'Inde, 'Blush Cluster', or 'Noisette Carnée' (French for Flesh-coloured Noisette). According to the RHS Encyclopedia of Roses, the cultivar is mostly called 'Blush Noisette' in America, and otherwise known as 'Noisette Carnée'. 'Blush Noisette' arose as a seedling from the light pink rose hybrid 'Champney's Pink Cluster', introduced by Champneys around 1811 (synonym 'Champneyana'), and was the first frost-hardy climber flowering repeatedly, giving the cultivar importance as a parent rose.

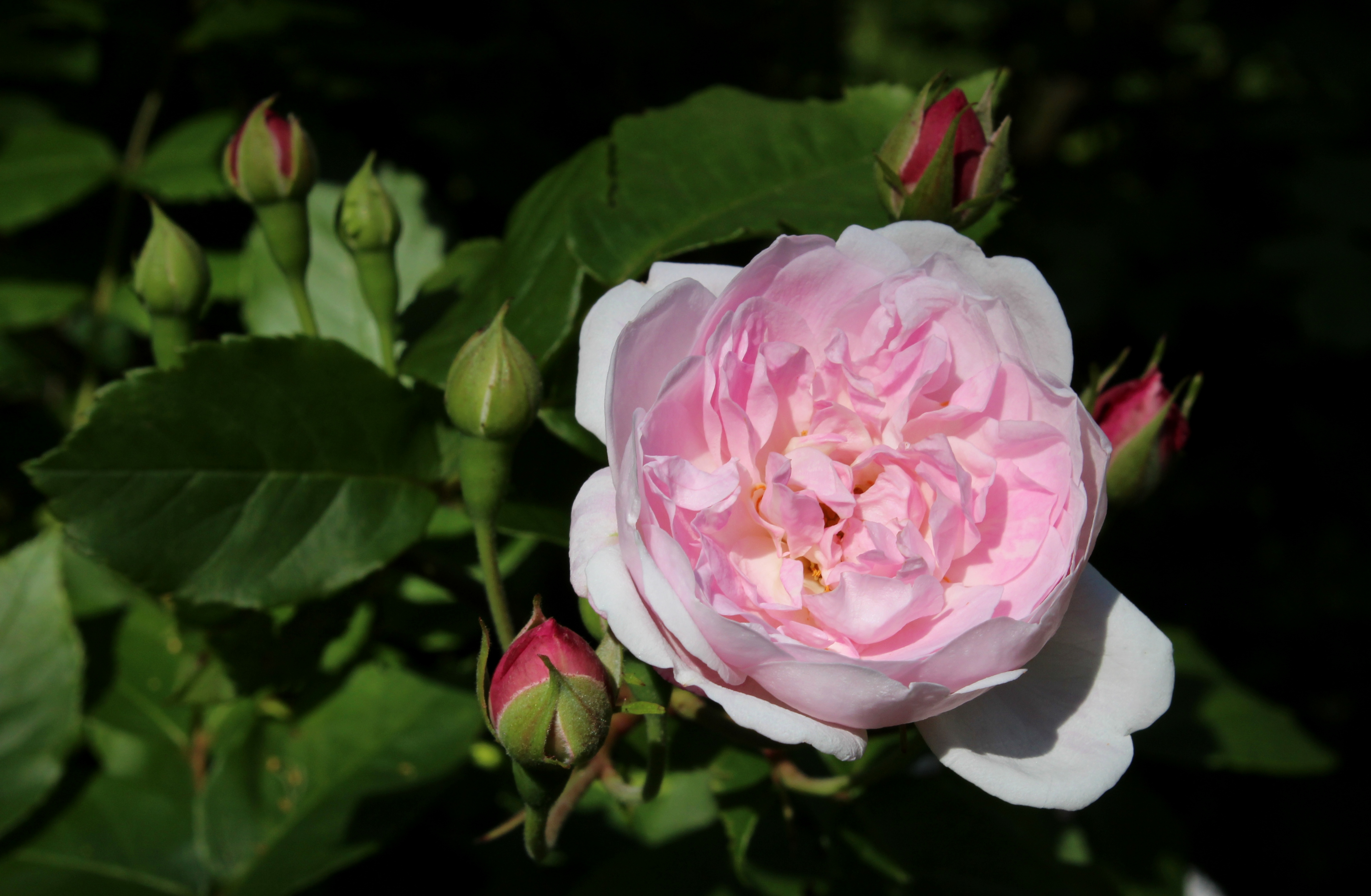
'Blush Noisette' flower and buds

The dainty, cupped, semi-double to double flowers appear solitary and in tight clusters on long, smooth stems. They have a diameter of up to 2.5 inches (6.4 cm) with up to 35 petals. Their colour changes from crimson buds to pale lilac pink and fades to pinkish white in mature petals. 'Blush Noisette' is described to have a characteristic clove-like fragrance varying in strength. The flowers appear continuously throughout the season, that can span the entire year in warmer regions.

The vigorous plant is a small climber or a tall shrub rose, reaching 1.5 to 2.5 meters height (5' to 8') at a width of 1.5 m (5'), but needs a few years to grow to its final height, as the cultivars puts more energy into its many flowers. As a climber, the cultivar can be trained to reach heights of up to 4.5 metres (15 ft). The dense shrub has long arching shoots with a reddish colour, very few prickles, and many soft, glossy leaves. The foliage is medium to dark grey green with crimson veins. 'Blush Noisette' tolerates half shade, is disease resistant and heat tolerant, but not hardy in severe winters (USDA zone 7) and the flowers are easily damaged by rain. It can be grown solitary, in dense hedges, or with some support be trained as a climber and is well suited for obelisk trellises.
