= Regina Angelorum (Bouguereau) =

1900 painting by William-Adolphe Bouguereau

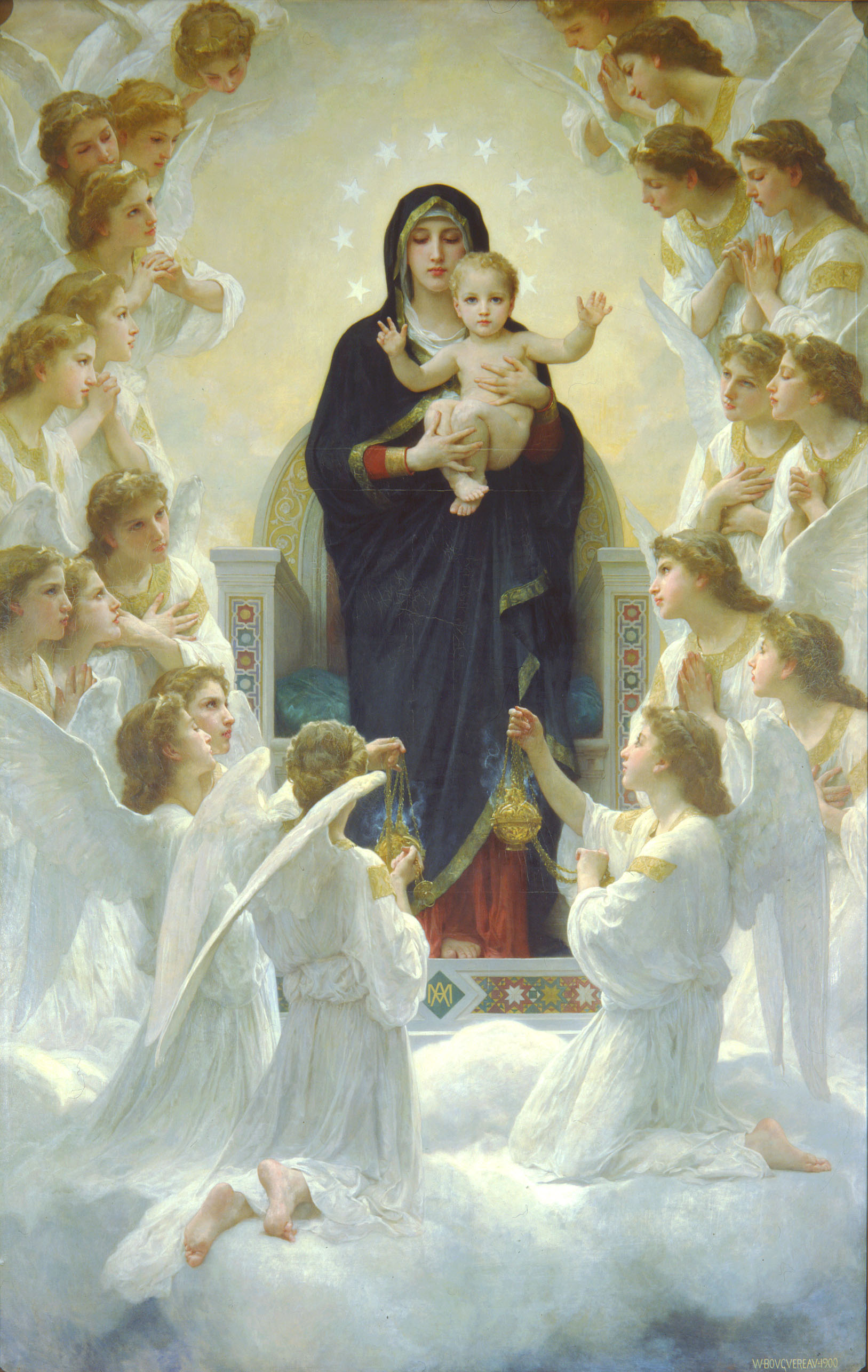
- Artist: William-Adolphe Bouguereau
- Year: 1900
- Medium: Oil on canvas
- Dimensions: 285 cm × 185 cm (112 in × 73 in)
- Location: Petit Palais, Paris

Queen of the Angels (Latin: Regina Angelorum) is an oil painting by the French artist William-Adolphe Bouguereau, depicting the Virgin and Child surrounded by angels. Two angels kneel in front of them, holding censers in their hands. The painting's dimensions are 285 × 185 cm.

It is exhibited at the Petit Palais, in Paris.
