= The Nut Gatherers =

1882 painting by William-Adolphe Bouguereau

- Les Noisettes
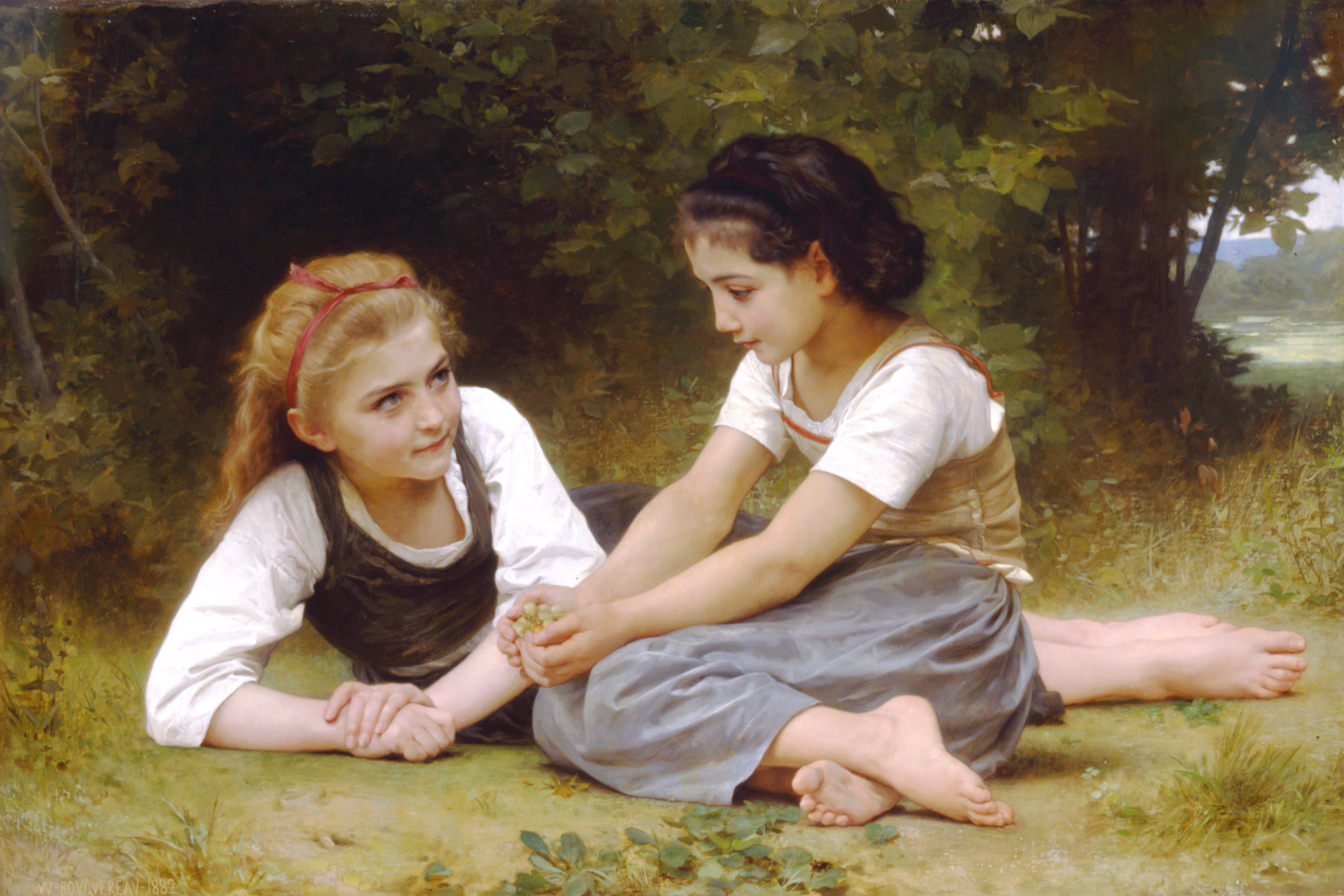
- Artist: William-Adolphe Bouguereau
- Year: 1882
- Medium: oil on canvas
- Dimensions: 87.6 cm × 134 cm (34.5 in × 53 in)
- Location: Detroit Institute of Arts, Michigan

The Nut Gatherers (Les Noisettes, literally, The Hazelnuts) is an 1882 oil painting by the French artist William-Adolphe Bouguereau. It is one of the most popular pieces at the Detroit Institute of Arts. The painting was donated to the museum by William E. Scripps in 1954.
