= Hermione =

Hermione most commonly refers to:

- Hermione Granger, a character in Harry Potter
- Hermione (given name), a female given name
- Hermione (mythology), only daughter of Menelaus and Helen in Greek mythology and original bearer of the name

Hermione may also refer to:

== Arts and literature ==
- Cadmus et Hermione, an opera by Jean-Baptiste Lully
- HERmione, a novel by American poet, Hilda "H.D." Doolittle
- "Letter to Hermione", a song by David Bowie on David Bowie (1969 album)
- Hermione (opera), Max Bruch 1872

=== Characters ===
- Hermione, a character in William Shakespeare's play The Winter's Tale
- Hermione Lodge, mother of Veronica Lodge, in Archie Comics

== Biology ==
- Hermione, a taxonomic synonym for the insect genus Epiphryne
- Hermione, a taxonomic synonym for the plant genus Narcissus
- Hipparchia hermione, the rock grayling, a butterfly

== Ships ==
- French ship Hermione, twelve ships of the French Navy
  - French frigate Hermione (1779), a French frigate that carried La Fayette to join the American fight for independence in 1780
  - French frigate Hermione (2014), a replica of the 1779 original, built in France from 1996 to 2012, launched in 2014
- HMS Hermione, four ships of the Royal Navy
- Spanish frigate Hermione, an 18th-century frigate of the Spanish Navy

== Places ==
- Hermione (Argolis), a town of ancient Argolis, Greece
  - Ermioni, a modern resort town on the site of the ancient Hermione

== Other uses ==
- 121 Hermione, an asteroid
- Hermione (Tallulah, Louisiana), a Greek Revival building built in 1855 in Tallulah, Louisiana
- Hermiones or Irminones, a group of early Germanic tribes
- Hotspot Ecosystem Research and Man's Impact On European Seas (HERMIONE), an EU-funded deep-sea research project
- Sony Ericsson P990, a mobile phone codenamed Hermione
- USS Hawk (IX-14), formerly called Hermione
- Hermionê Grammatikê (translation: ‘Hermione the literary lady' or 'Hermione the language teacher’), a mummy on display at Girton College, Cambridge
- Hermione Granger and the Quarter Life Crisis, a fanfic TV series

== See also ==
- Ermione, an opera by Gioachino Rossini
- Hermine (disambiguation)
- Hermia
- Hermia (disambiguation)
- Actor who played Hermione Granger:
  - Emma Watson
  - Arabella Stanton
- Emma Watson (disambiguation)
