= Hermine =

Hermine is a feminine form of Herman, consisting of the elements harja- "army" and mann- "man".

It could also be a German variant of the Greek name Hermione.

Hermine, Herminie, or Hermin may refer to:

== People with the given name Hermine ==
=== Mononym ===
- Archduchess Hermine of Austria (1817–1842), member of the House of Habsburg-Lorraine
- Princess Hermine of Anhalt-Bernburg-Schaumburg-Hoym (1797–1817), archduchess of Austria
- Princess Hermine of Waldeck and Pyrmont (1827–1910), German princess

=== B ===
- Hermine Bosetti (1875-1936), German coloratura soprano
- Hermine Baron (1912–1996), American contract bridge player
- Hermine “Herma” Bauma (1915–2003), Austrian athlete
- Hermine Beckett-Hanna, who may have started National Grandparents Day
- Hermine Berthold (1896–1990), German resistance activist during the Nazi years and politician
- Hermine Boettcher-Brueckner (1918–?), Nazi SS auxiliary guard
- Hermine Bosetti (1875–1936), German coloratura soprano
- Hermine Braunsteiner (1919–1999), Nazi camp guard

=== C ===
- Herminie Cadolle (1845–1926), inventor of the modern bra and founder of Cadolle house

=== D ===
- Hermine David (1886–1970), French painter and wife of Jules Pascin
- Hermine de Clermont-Tonnerre, a celebrity who competed on La Ferme Célébrités
- Hermine de Graaf (1951–2013), Dutch novelist
- Hermine Demoriane (born 1942), French singer, writer and tightrope walker

=== F ===
- Hermine Freed (1940–1998), American painter and video artist

=== H ===
- Hermine Hartleben (1846–1919), German Egyptologist
- Hermine Haselböck (born 1967), Austrian mezzo-soprano in opera, concert and lied
- Hermine Horiot (born 1986), French cellist
- Hermine Hug-Hellmuth (1871–1924), Austrian psychoanalyst
- Hermine Huntgeburth (born 1957), German film director

=== J ===
- Hermin Joseph (born 1964), Dominican sprinter

=== K ===
- Hermine Agavni Kalustyan (1914–1989), Armenian-Turkish mathematician, educator, and politician
- Hermine Kittel (1879–1948), Austrian contralto
- Hermine E. Kleinert (1880–1943), American painter and artist
- Hermine Körner (1878–1960), German actress, director and theater manager
- Hermine Küchenmeister-Rudersdorf (1822–1882), German singer, composer and voice teacher

=== L ===
- Hermine Lanctôt (1861-1943), Quebec author, journalist, and schoolteacher
- Hermine Lecomte du Noüy (1854-1915), French writer
- Hermine Liska (1930–2024), Austrian Jehovah's Witness

=== M ===
- Hermine Moquette (1869–1945), Dutch archivist

=== N ===
- Hermine Naghdalyan (born 1960), Armenian economist and politician

=== O ===
- Hermine Overbeck-Rohte (1869–1937), German landscape painter

=== P ===
- Hermine Pfleger (1884–1980), better known as Mia May, Austrian actress

=== R ===
- Hermine Reuss of Greiz (1887–1947), second wife of German Emperor William II
- Hermine E. Ricketts (1956–2019), Jamaican-born American architect
- Hermine Riss (1903–1980), Austrian Righteous among the Nations

=== S ===
- Hermine Santrouschitz (1909–2010), better known as Miep Gies, who hid the family of Anne Frank in her attic
- Hermine Schröder (1911-1978), German track and field athlete
- Hermine Stindt (1888–1974), German swimmer who competed in the 1912 Olympics
- Hermine von Siegstädt (1844–1883), Austrian operatic soprano
- Hermine Speier (1898–1989), German archaeologist
- Hermine Spies (1857-1893), German concert and opera singer

=== V ===
- Hermína Verešová (1815–1895), Hungarian (Slovak) education activist

=== W ===
- Hermine Waterneau (1862–1916), French painter

== Places ==
- Hermin, Pas-de-Calais, northern France
- Herminie, Pennsylvania, United States
- Sainte-Hermine, Vendée, western France

== Ships ==
- Grande Hermine, the ship believed to have brought Jacques Cartier to Saint-Pierre in 1535
- Petite Hermine, another of Jacques Cartier's ships

== Other ==
- L'Hermine, a 2015 French film
- Hermine, a fictional character in Herman Hesse's 1927 novel Steppenwolf
- Herminie, scène lyrique (H.29), an 1828 cantata for mezzo-soprano and orchestra by French composer Hector Berlioz
- Hurricane Hermine, a 2016 tropical cyclone that impacted the East Coast of the United States
- Tropical Storm Hermine (disambiguation)

== See also ==
- Ermine (disambiguation)
- Hermione (disambiguation)
