= La Ferme Célébrités season 3 =

La Ferme Célébrités
- Season 3
- No. of days: 70
- No. of housemates: 18
- Winner: Mickael
- Runner-up: David

Season chronology
- ← Previous; France series 2

The third season of La Ferme Célébrités en Afrique, a French TV reality show, aired on TF1 from January 29, 2010, to April 9, 2010. It was presented by Benjamin Castaldi and Jean-Pierre Foucault.

This season was won by Mickaël Vendetta, he won €110 000 for his chosen charity, "Secours populaire français", and take place in Africa.

== Contestants ==
Celebrity	Famous for	Finished
Mickaël Vendetta	Internet phenomenon	Winner
David Charvet	Actor and singer	Runner Up
Gregory Basso	Former reality-show star, actor	Finalist
Surya Bonaly	Pro figure skating star	Finalist
Christophe Guillarmé	Stylist	14th evicted
Velvet D'Amour	Model	13th evicted
Claudette Dion	Céline Dion's sister	12th evicted
Hermine de Clermont-Tonnerre	Jet set figure	11th evicted
Francky Vincent	Singer	10th evicted
Kelly Bochenko	Miss Paris deposed in 2010 after naked shots	9th evicted
Karine Dupray	Actress, singer and Anthony Dupray's sister	8th evicted
Miss Dominique	Singer, Nouvelle Star's finalist	7th evicted
Farid Khider	Kick-boxing former star	6th evicted
Adeline Blondieau	Actress, got divorced from Johnny Hallyday	5th walked
Célyne Durand	French TV host	4th walked
Jeane Manson	Singer	3rd evicted
Brigitte Nielsen	Actress, Real TV Star and Sylvester Stallone's former wife	2nd evicted
Aldo Maccione	Actor	1st walked

=== Nomination ===
	Week 1	Week 2	Week 3	Week 4	Week 5	Week 6	Week 7	Week 8	Week 9	Week 10
Mickael		Nominated		Nominated by the Head of Farm			Nominated by the Head of Farm	Nominated	Nominated	Winner (Day 70)
David	Head of Farm			Nominated			Nominated	Nominated	Nominated	Runner-up (Day 70)
Greg	Nominated	Head of Farm			Nominated by the Head of Farm	Head of Farm		Nominated	Nominated	Third Place (Day 70)
Surya						Nominated by the Head of Farm	Head of Farm	Nominated	Nominated	Fourth Place (Day 67)
Christophe			Head of Farm					Nominated	Nominated	Evicted (Day 63)
Velvet								Nominated	Nominated	Evicted (Day 63)
Claudette					Nominated	Head of Farm		Nominated	Evicted (Day 56)	
Hermine			Nominated by the Head of Farm	Head of Farm		Nominated		Nominated	Evicted (Day 56)	
Francky	Head of Farm		Nominated	Head of Farm			Nominated	Evicted (Day 49)		Guest
Kelly	Nominated						Nominated	Evicted (Day 49)		Guest
Karine	Not in the farm				Nominated	Nominated	Evicted (Day 42)			
Dominique	Not in the farm				Nominated	Evicted (Day 35)				
Farid				Nominated	Evicted (Day 28)					
Adeline	Head of Farm			Walked (Day 23)						
Célyne				Walked (Day 22)						
Jeane			Nominated	Evicted (Day 21)						
Brigitte	Nominated by the Head of Farm	Evicted (Day 7)								
Aldo	Head of Farm	Walked (Day 7)								
Up for eviction	Brigitte; Greg; Kelly	Mickael	Francky; Hermine; Jeane	David; Farid; Mickael	Claudette; Dominique; Greg; Karine	Hermine; Karine; Surya	David; Francky; Kelly; Mickael	Mickael/Christophe; David/Greg; Surya/Velvet; Claudette/Hermine	Christophe; David; Mickael; Surya; Velvet	David; Greg; Mickael; Surya
Walked	Aldo	none		Célyne; Adeline	none					
Evicted	Brigitte; 23% to save	Mickael; 61% to save	Jeane; 22% to save	Farid; 27% to save	Dominique; 15% to save	Karine; 14% to save	Francky; 22% to save Kelly; 9% to save	Hermine & Claudette; 6% to save	Velvet; 3% to save Christophe; 7% to save	Surya - 12% to win (out of 4); Greg - 22% to win (out of 3)
Evicted	Brigitte; 23% to save	Mickael; 61% to save	Jeane; 22% to save	Farid; 27% to save	Dominique; 15% to save	Karine; 14% to save	Francky; 22% to save Kelly; 9% to save	Hermine & Claudette; 6% to save	Velvet; 3% to save Christophe; 7% to save	David - 27% to win (out of 3)
Evicted	Brigitte; 23% to save	Mickael; 61% to save	Jeane; 22% to save	Farid; 27% to save	Dominique; 15% to save	Karine; 14% to save	Francky; 22% to save Kelly; 9% to save	Hermine & Claudette; 6% to save	Velvet; 3% to save Christophe; 7% to save	Mickael - 51% to win
