= Nataf (surname) =

Nataf is a surname. Notable people with the surname include:

- Igor-Alexandre Nataf (born 1978), French chess player
- Mallaury Nataf (born 1972), French singer and actress
- Robert Nataf, French chemist
