= Herminie =

Herminie can refer to:

== People ==
=== Given name ===
- Herminie Cadolle, French inventor
- Herminie Déhérain, French painter
- Herminie Templeton Kavanagh (1861–1933), British writer
- Herminie de La Brousse de Verteillac, French poet

=== Surname ===
- Patrick Herminie, Seychellois politician

== Places ==
- Herminie, Pennsylvania, U.S., a hamlet

== See also ==
- Hermine (disambiguation)
- Hermione (disambiguation)
- Harmony (disambiguation)
