= Oread (disambiguation) =

An Oread is a type of nymph in Greek mythology.

Oread may also refer to:

- Oread (poem), a poem by Hilda Doolittle
- Oread Limestone, construction stone from Mount Oread
- Mount Oread, "The Hill" upon which the University of Kansas is located
- Lake Orestiada, a lake in Greece
- Orestiada, a city in Greece
- Fey (Dungeons & Dragons) § Oread, a creature in Dungeons & Dragons
- Orestíada, the Spanish and Catalan name of a trilogy by Aeschylus
