= Hermione (given name) =

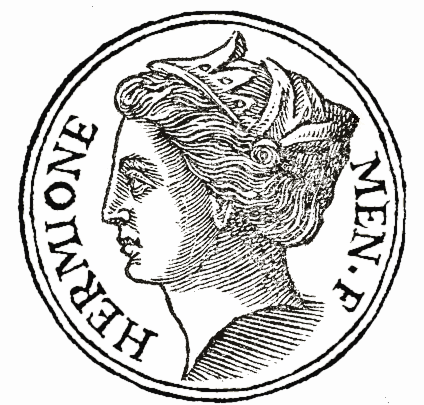
- Hermione was the daughter of Menelaus and Helen in Greek mythology
- Pronunciation: /hɜːrˈmaɪəni/ hur-MY-ə-nee
- Gender: Female

Origin
- Origin: Greek
- Meaning: derived from Hermes

Other names
- Related names: Herminie, Minnie, Mimi

Hermione (Ancient Greek: Ἑρμιόνη [hermi.ónɛː]) is a feminine given name derived from the Greek messenger god Hermes. Hermione was the daughter of Menelaus and Helen in Greek mythology. It was also the name of an early Christian martyr, Hermione of Ephesus, and of a character in William Shakespeare’s play The Winter's Tale. Usage of the name has increased in recent years due largely to a character with the name in the Harry Potter series by J.K. Rowling.

== People ==
- Hermione of Ephesus (died 117 A.D.), an early Christian martyr
- Hermione Asachi (1821–1900), Romanian writer and translator
- Hermione Baddeley (1906–1986), English actress
- Hermione Cobbold (1905–2004), British matriarch
- Hermione Cock (1904–2015), British female supercentenarian
- Hermione Cockburn (born 1973), British TV and radio presenter
- Hermione Corfield (born 1993), English actress and model
- Hermione Cronje, South African prosecutor
- Hermione Darnborough (1915–2010), English ballerina
- Hermione Eyre (born 1980), British journalist and novelist
- Hermione Farthingale (born 1949), English dancer, yoga teacher, and dated David Bowie and inspired some of his songs
- Hermione FitzGerald (1864–1895), Duchess of Leinster
- Hermione FitzGerald (born 1985), Irish professional golfer
- Hermione Gingold (1897–1987), English actress
- Hermione Gulliford, English actress
- Hermione Hammond (1910–2005), English painter
- Hermione Hannen (1913–1983), English actress
- Hermione Harvey (1931–2016), English actress and dancer
- Hermione Ruth Herrick (1889–1983), New Zealand Guide leader and women's naval administrator
- Hermione Hobhouse (1934–2014), British architectural historian
- Hermione Hoby (born 1985), British author, journalist, and cultural critic
- Hermione Kitson (born 1984), Australian news presenter and reporter
- Hermione Knox, Countess of Ranfurly, (1913–2001), British author, Countess of Ranfurly
- Hermione Lambton (1906–1990), Countess of Durham
- Hermione Lee (born 1948), British biographer and critic
- Hermione Lister-Kaye (born 1990), British naturalist and journalist, daughter of John Lister-Kaye
- Hermione Norris (born 1967), English actress
- Hermione Peters (born 1994), Belgian canoeist
- Hermione von Preuschen (1854–1918), German painter and author
- Hermione Rogers (1895–1917), British nurse who died when HMS Osmanieh was torpedoed
- Hermione (Hennessy) Ross (born 1966), British singer-songwriter
- Hermione Shirley (1891–1969), Countess Ferrers
- Hermione Underwood, Australian actress
- Hermione Wiltshire (born 1963), English photographer

== Fictional characters ==
- Hermione (mythology), the daughter of Menelaus and Helen in Greek mythology
- Hermione, a character in the novel Atonement by Ian McEwan
- Hermione, a character based on the mythological Harmonia in the opera Cadmus et Hermione by Jean-Baptiste Lully
- Aunt Hermione, a character in the BBC TV Series The Durrells played by Barbara Flynn
- Hermione, a male character in the 1582 court drama The Rare Triumphs of Love and Fortune
- Hermione, Queen of Sicily, a character in the play The Winter's Tale by William Shakespeare
- Hermione, a character in the novel Women in Love by D.H. Lawrence
- Hermione Bagwa, a character in Star Wars: Episode II – Attack of the Clones
- Hermione de Borromeo, a character in the Japanese animated TV series Romeo x Juliet
- Hermione Bostock, a character in the fiction of P. G. Wodehouse
- Hermione Gart, an autobiographical character in the novel HERmione by H.D.
- Hermione Granger, a main character in the Harry Potter novels and films
- Hermione Gravell-Pitt, a character in the novel Around the World with Auntie Mame
- Hermione Herman, the sister of character Pee-wee Herman
- Hermione Lodge, a character in the Archie Comics and in the TV series Riverdale
- Hermione Makepeace (Minnie the Minx), comic strip character from The Beano
- Hermione Montego, a character in the 1966 episode of Batman (TV series), "The Thirteenth Hat"
- Hermione Morton, a character in the British TV series Ripper Street
- Hermione Pennistone, the main character in the 1932 novel Marriage of Hermione by Richmal Crompton
- Hermione Seymour, the main character in the 1791 novel Hermione, or the Orphan Sister by Charlotte Lennox
- Hermione Shotover, a character in the play Heartbreak House of G. B. Shaw
- Hermione Trumpington-Bonnet, a character in the British TV series Monarch of the Glen

== See also ==
- Hermine (disambiguation)
- Hermes
