= Francky Vincent =

French musician

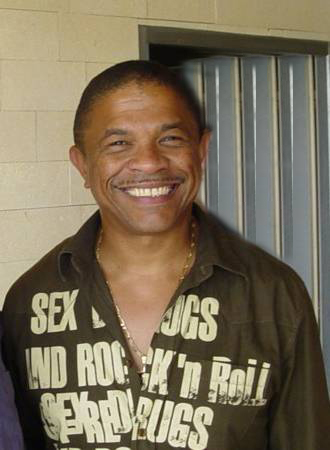

Background information
- Born: Franck Joseph Vincent; 18 April 1956 (age 69)
- Origin: Pointe-à-Pitre, Guadeloupe, French West Indies
- Genres: Adult Contemporary; Cadence-lypso; Compas; Kadans; World beat Zouk
- Occupations: Singer-songwriter; Producer; Manager; Painter; Comedian; Writer
- Instruments: Vocals, guitar, gwo ka, Intonarumori
- Years active: 1975–present
- Website: www.myspace.com/franckyvincentcebon

Franck Joseph "Francky" Vincent (born 18 April 1956) is a French singer, songwriter, record producer, painter, talent manager and musician from Guadeloupe.

== Biography ==
=== Childhood ===
Francky Vincent was born on 18 April 1956 in Pointe-à-Pitre, Guadeloupe, to a modest family, an engineer father and a mother embroiderer. After a difficult childhood in red light districts of his native city, he abandoned his studies at two months of the bachelor to occupy the post of Clerical Officer in the service of social security registration of Pointe-à-Pitre, where there is dismissed after six months. In 1976 he left to do his military service in Guyana and came home the following year and became head of a store selling spare parts for light aircraft in Raizet.

=== Career ===
In 1975, he joined a small, suburban compas group called Taboo No. 2 as a percussionist, and he traveled Guadeloupe with his bandmates to host weddings and dances. He released two albums with them, Ambition et Ti Paulette.

Finally, he decided to go it alone and abandon Taboo No. 2 to write and compose obscene, even shocking songs. His first solo album, sold under the mantle, sold 50,000 copies.

Since the 1980s, Francky became known throughout the Caribbean community living in Paris or the Caribbean. Despite a ban on air (which ultimately turned out to be very good publicity), his music appealed to tourists.

In 1990, he decided to produce his own music and created Francky Vincent productions. He began to sing more in French in order to challenge the majors and to develop nationally. The following year, his album Alice ça Glisse was a hit in the West Indies and sold more than 50 000 copies. At this time, he appeared for the first time on stage in Paris Olympia. Following this, noting that the record companies still were not interested in him, he moved to Paris in February 1992.

Two years later, he signed a license agreement with Arcadi (now Wagram Music) and launched the famous compilation Fruit De La Passion (Vas-y Francky c'est bon) which was a huge success. The lead song was the hit of the summer, and the album had other popular songs like "Alice ça Glisse", "Le Tourment D'Amour", "Viens dans mon duplex". These songs were broadcast on radio and in nightclubs. The disc was ranked 17th in the Top Albums Ifop / SNEP for 13 weeks and sold over 200 000 copies, Francky was a guest on French television studios by Michel Drucker, Jean-Pierre Foucault, amongst others. He played Olympia once again and began touring with international success.

In 1996, his album Le Tombeur was little publicized, ranked 40th and remained two weeks in the Top Albums Ifop / SNEP. At this time, he lived between Baie-Mahault and Paris. His success continued with A La Folie in 1999, which included covering Kassav's song "Zouk la sé sel médikaman", and "Chanteur de Zouk Love", a song dedicated to all Zouk Love singers, using absurd lyrics and comical themes.

His next album in 2004, Ça va chauffer, did not meet the success he expected. In this album, Francky notably related the problems he had trying to manage a restaurant in the song "Droit de réponse".

In March 2009, Francky Vincent signed a contract with Universal Music. He has since released a summer anthem single, "Tu veux mon zizi", which made an entry in the charts by automatically placing sixth and staying twenty-nine weeks in the rankings. In July 2009, he released a double compilation called My fest'of. This allowed Francky to come back under the media spotlight and score another hit.

On 29 January 2010, he joined the 3rd installment of a French reality TV show named La Ferme Célébrités, which took place in South Africa, more precisely in Zulu Nyala near Hluhluwe. This show was broadcast on TF1 with others celebrities such as Brigitte Nielsen, David Charvet, Jean-Marc Vivenza and Surya Bonaly. Francky lasted seven weeks in the game, promoting his association Association Cent Familles (Association One Hundred Families) led by Jean Luc Lahaye. He was eliminated on March 19 during his second nomination to face Kelly Bochenko (to be removed with him), David Charvet and Mickael Vendetta.

In June 2010, he went on tour and released his summer an Industrial Zouk single hit "Moi J'aime Scier".

=== Personal life ===
Francky resided with Sandrine, his wife, in Brevans until their marriage ended; They had a son, born in 2005. He has more children from other marriages and relationships. He often returns with his family to Guadeloupe.

== Discography ==
- Mathis métis (2012)
- My fest'of (2009)
- La vie en rose
- Ca va chauffer (2004)
- Complètement Francky (2003)
- Réchauffe l'hiver (2001)
- A la Folie (1999)
- Collection Légende (1999)
- Faîtes la fête avec Francky Vincent (1998)
- Le Tombeur (1996)
- Aka manman (1995)
- The very best of Francky Vincent (1995)
- Fruit de la passion (1994)
- Nigivir (1993)
- Les meilleurs succès de Francky Vincent (1992)
- Alice ça glisse (1991)
- Manze Zaza (1990)
- Coquinement Zouk (1991)
- 15 ans déjà... (Putain !) (1989)
- Manze Lola (1988)
- Positif(1987)
- Piña Colada (1986)
- Le lolo (1985)
- Comme Franky (voyé dlo) (1984)
- Dans la chaleur de la nuit
- Qui m'aime me suive (1983)

and album with Tabou n°2:

- Ambition
- Ti Paulette
- Retour en force
- La Braguette d'or (1978)
- L'âme du Tabou n°

Tu veux mon zizi (2009)
