= Op. 40 =

In music, Op. 40 stands for Opus number 40. Compositions that are assigned this number include:

- Arnold – Symphony No. 2
- Barber – Antony and Cleopatra
- Beethoven – Romance for violin and orchestra no. 1 Op. 40
- Brahms – Horn Trio
- Bruch – Hermione
- Chopin – Polonaises Op. 40
- Dohnányi – Symphony No. 2
- Dvořák – Nocturne in B major
- Elgar – Cockaigne (In London Town)
- Finzi – Cello Concerto
- Holberg – Holberg Suite
- Mendelssohn – Piano Concerto No. 2
- Rachmaninoff – Piano Concerto No. 4
- Reger – Zwei Choralphantasien, Op. 40
- Robbins – The Concert
- Saint-Saëns – Danse macabre
- Schumann – 5 Lieder
- Schwabe – Fervaal
- Shostakovich – Cello Sonata
- Strauss – Ein Heldenleben
