= Danièle Gilbert =

French television presenter

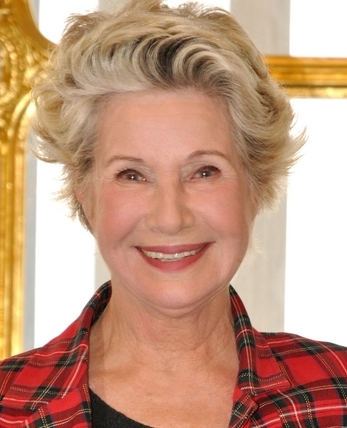
Gilbert in 2011

Danièle Gilbert (born 20 March 1943) is a French television presenter.

== Life ==
Gilbert was born in Chamalières in Puy-de-Dôme. She obtained a degree in German because she wanted to become a German teacher. During her studies, she did amateur drama and then became a radio announcer when the Clermont-Ferrand station was created to present the Weather. Then she became a journalist, reporting for the station. Danièle Gilbert made her TV debut in 1964 as an announcer at the ORTF for the regional station of Clermont-Ferrand after having been a candidate in the program The Speakers' Ball.

In 1966, when Anne-Marie Peysson was pregnant, Danièle Gilbert went to Paris to try and possibly replace her, but it was only a year later, on 18 February 1967, that Max Favalelli, after having watched the tests of the many candidates, entrusted her the presentation of her first national program: The Seven and two program appeared on Saturday at half past twelve to one o'clock. She also participated in the newspaper of Île-de-France. She became a celebrity on television, chaining during thirteen years the variety programs of mid-day: first Midi Magazine, from September 1968 to December 1971 Jacques Martin, who co-presented with her Midi Magazine, the On this occasion, the nickname "La grande Duduche" is inspired by the comic book Le Grand Duduche by Cabu. In 1972, she hosted Télé Midi 72 and Midi Trente from January 1972 to December 1974 on the first channel of the ORTF.

From 6 January 1975, the date of creation of TF1, she hosted the daily and live program Midi Première.

Danièle Gilbert was a popular host and her show Midi Premiere was a great success in terms of audience. A native of Chamalières, a town whose Valéry Giscard d'Estaing was mayor from 1967 to 1974, Danièle Gilbert publicly expressed his sympathy for the latter, having invited him on her program and having participated in his support committees during the 1974 presidential elections. and 1981.

She was sacked in December 1981 from television, following the election of François Mitterrand to the presidency of the Republic, and the arrival of the left in power. In May of the same year. she hosted the last of her flagship program Midi premiere on 1 January 1982 after thirteen years of broadcasting in the same time slot. She was replaced by Anne Sinclair who supported François Mitterrand, with the program Les Visiteurs du jour which will remain on the air for only six months.

She will not find a replacement regular show. She participated mainly in entertainment in shopping centers, supermarkets, galas, fairs and exhibitions at flea markets, where she earned a better living than on television. She also recorded some songs.

She appeared on the right list in the municipal elections of 1983 in Clermont-Ferrand. Elected city councilor in the opposition, she resigned shortly thereafter. In 2008, she ran in the municipal elections in Châtellerault (Vienne), but was not elected in 1987. Pierre Bellemare offered her the host of Since you're at home, but the change management at TF1 led her to resign.

In 2004, she was in eight weeks of the first season of La Ferme Célébrités.

== Radio ==
- 1976–1977: Les Après-midi de Danièle Gilbert (Europe 1)
- 1992–1994: Tout le monde déguste avec Didier Gustin (RMC)
- 1993–1994: Allô Danièle (RMC)
- 2014: Chroniqueuse exceptionnelle le vendredi 28 mars 2014 dans Les pieds dans le plat présentée par Cyril Hanouna sur Europe 1, en remplacement de Thierry Geffrotin, indisponible ce jour-là.

== Discography ==
- Donnez-nous des jardins
- Scusez-moi, m'sieur Antoine (1971)
- Adieu l'année (1973) No. 43 Top 50 France
- Je ne vous oublie pas (1985)
- Le Petit Chaperon bleu (1985)
- Boum boum (1986)
- Bonne fête maman (1988)
- La Bouche en cœur (1988)
- Les Idées folles (1988)
- Je suis comme je suis (1993)
- C'est la ferme ! (2004)

== Theater ==
- 1977: La rose et le chou-fleur, de Jacques Pierre, au Théâtre La Bruyère
- 2008: Monique est demandée caisse 12 de Raphaël Mezrahi, mise en scène de Philippe Sohier
- 2009: Presse pipole d'Olivier Lejeune, mise en scène de l'auteur, théâtre du Palais Royal
- 2011: Rassurons les autruches de Philippe Sohier

== Bibliography ==
- Je reviendrai, éd. Michel Lafon-Carrère, 1984
- S'il vous plaît, M. le Président, TF1 Éditions, 1996
- La-grandeduduche.fr, éd. Pascal Petiot, 2007 ISBN 978-2848140506
- Il faut que je vous raconte, Talent Éditions, 2018
