= Nathalie Simon (disambiguation) =

Nathalie Simon may refer to:

- Nathalie Simon (born 1962), French Olympic sprinter
- Nathalie Simon (presenter) (born 1964), French television and radio host for Première Compagnie (France series 1)
