= French ship Hermione =

Twelve ships of the French Navy have borne the name Hermione, in honour of Hermione, daughter of King Menelaus of Sparta and his wife, Helen of Troy.

== Ships ==
- Hermione (1699), a 30-gun frigate, lead ship of her class
- Hermione (1706), a 34-gun frigate
- Hermione (1749), a 24-gun frigate
- Hermione (1754), a 22-gun frigate
- Hermione (1779), a 32-gun Concorde-class frigate
- Ville de Milan (1803), a frigate that bore the name Hermione during her career
- Hermione (1804), a 40-gun Hortense-class frigate
- Hermione (1811), a 46-gun frigate
- Hermione (1860) (1860), a 28-gun frigate converted to steam on keel
- Hermione (1917), a Bellone-class submarine
- Hermione (Q211) an Aurore-class submarine broken up incomplete on slip in 1940

== See also ==
- Hermione (2014), a replica of the Hermione of 1779, currently in service.
- HMS Hermione (Note: Roche (vol.1, p.241) mentions HMS Hermione of 1782 as having been surrendered by her mutinied crew and perhaps incorporated in the French Navy; it appears, however, that she was with the Spanish Navy the entire time until her recapture by the Royal Navy.)

== Notes and references ==
=== Bibliography ===
- Roche, Jean-Michel (2005). Dictionnaire des bâtiments de la flotte de guerre française de Colbert à nos jours. Vol. 1. Group Retozel-Maury Millau. pp. 241–242. ISBN 978-2-9525917-0-6. OCLC 165892922.
- Roche, Jean-Michel (2005). Dictionnaire des bâtiments de la flotte de guerre française de Colbert à nos jours. Vol. 2. Group Retozel-Maury Millau. p. 250. ISBN 978-2-9525917-0-6. OCLC 165892922.
