= Hermia (disambiguation) =

Hermia is a fictional character from A Midsummer Night's Dream.

Hermia may also refer to:

- 685 Hermia, an S-type asteroid
- Hermia (Finland), a science park
- Hermia (Cilicia)

== See also ==
- Hermione (disambiguation)
