= La Ferme Célébrités season 2 =

La Ferme Célébrités
- Season 2
- No. of days: 59
- No. of housemates: 15
- Winner: Jordy
- Runner-up: Daniel

Series chronology
- ← Previous series 1 Next → series 3

The second season of La Ferme Célébrités, French TV reality show was broadcast from 30 April 2005 to 28 June 2005 TF1. It was presented by Christophe Dechavanne and Patrice Carmouze.

It was won by Jordy who won 180,000 € for the "France Parkinson" research on Parkinson's disease association.

== Contestants ==
Celebrity	Famous for	Finished
Jordy	Singer	Winner
Daniel Ducruet	Princess Stéphanie's former husband	Runner Up
Joanna	Model and singer	Finalist
Nathalie Marquay Pernaut	Model and Miss France 1987	Finalist
Régine	Actress and singer	11th evicted
Patrick Dupond	Professional dancer	10th evicted
Philippe Risoli	TV presenter	9th evicted
Plastic Bertrand	Singer	8th evicted
Marianne von Brandstetter	Billionaire	7th evicted
Jerry de la Vega	Model	6th evicted
Véronika Loubry	TV presenter	5th evicted
Princess Erika	Singer	4th walked
Jango Edwards	Clown	3rd evicted
Henri Leconte	Retired tennis player	2nd walked
Mallaury Nataf	Actress and singer	1st evicted

=== Nominations ===
	Semaine 1	Semaine 2	Semaine 3	Semaine 4	Semaine 5	Semaine 6	Semaine 7	Semaine 8	Semaine 9
Jordy	Jerry; Mallaury	Jango; Patrick	Véronika; Philippe	Régine; Jerry	Patrick; Marianne	Régine; Plastic	No; Nominations	No; Nominations	Winner (Day 60)
Daniel	Not in the farm		Véronika; Marianne	Régine; Marianne	Patrick; Marianne	Régine; Plastic	No; Nominations	No; Nominations	Second place (Day 60)
Joanna	Mallaury; Erika	Jango; Marianne	Véronika; Erika	Jerry ?	Patrick; Marianne	Régine; Plastic	No; Nominations	No; Nominations	Third place (Day 60)
Nathalie	Mallaury; Erika	Jango; Régine	Marianne; Joanna	Régine; Marianne	Patrick; Marianne	Régine; Plastic	No; Nominations	No; Nominations	Fourth place (Day 60)
Régine	Mallaury; Véronika	Jango; Patrick	Véronika; Jerry	Jordy; Jerry	Patrick; Joanna	Jordy; Plastic	No; Nominations	No; Nominations	Evicted (Day 56)
Philippe	Mallaury; Plastic	Jango; Patrick	Véronika; Joanna	Régine; Jerry	Patrick; Joanna	Jordy; Plastic	No; Nominations	Evicted (Day 49)	
Patrick	Mallaury; Plastic	Nathalie; Véronika	Véronika; Jerry	Régine; Philippe	Daniel; Nathalie	Daniel; Plastic	No; Nominations	Evicted (Day 49)	
Plastic	Mallaury; Erika	Régine; Patrick	Philippe; Joanna	Régine; Jordy	Patrick; Nathalie	Philippe; Jordy	Evicted (Day 42)		
Marianne	Plastic; Mallaury	Jordy; Régine	Véronika; Erika	Plastic; Jordy	Patrick; Nathalie	Evicted (Day 35)			
Jerry	Jordy; Mallaury	Marianne; Régine	Véronika; Joanna	Régine; Marianne	Evicted (Day 28)				
Véronika	Mallaury; Jordy	Jango; Marianne	Marianne; Joanna	Evicted (Day 21)					
Erika	Mallaury; Nathalie	Jango; Patrick	Régine; Joanna	Walked (Day 20)					
Jango	Erika; Véronika	Plastic; Patrick	Evicted (Day 14)						
Henri	Mallaury; Erika	Jango; Patrick	Walked (Day 13)						
Mallaury	Plastic; Jerry	Evicted (Day 7)							
Walked	none	Henri	Erika	none					
Up for eviction	Erika; Mallaury	Patrick; Jango	Véronika; Joanna	Régine; Jerry	Patrick; Marianne	Régine; Plastic	Jordy; Daniel; Philippe; Patrick	Joanna; Nathalie; Régine	Jordy; Daniel; Joanna; Nathalie
Evicted	Mallaury; 39% to save	Jango; 42% to save	Verónika; 60% to save	Jerry; 34% to save	Marianne; 43% to save	Plastic; 23% to save	Patrick; 10% to save	Régine; 21% to save	Nathalie; 19.26% to win
Evicted	Mallaury; 39% to save	Jango; 42% to save	Verónika; 60% to save	Jerry; 34% to save	Marianne; 43% to save	Plastic; 23% to save	Patrick; 10% to save	Régine; 21% to save	Joanna; 23.20% to win
Evicted	Mallaury; 39% to save	Jango; 42% to save	Verónika; 60% to save	Jerry; 34% to save	Marianne; 43% to save	Plastic; 23% to save	Philippe; 20% to save	Régine; 21% to save	Daniel; 23.26% to win
Evicted	Mallaury; 39% to save	Jango; 42% to save	Verónika; 60% to save	Jerry; 34% to save	Marianne; 43% to save	Plastic; 23% to save	Philippe; 20% to save	Régine; 21% to save	Jordy; 34.28% to win
