= Jacques Martin (TV host) =

French television host (1933–2007)

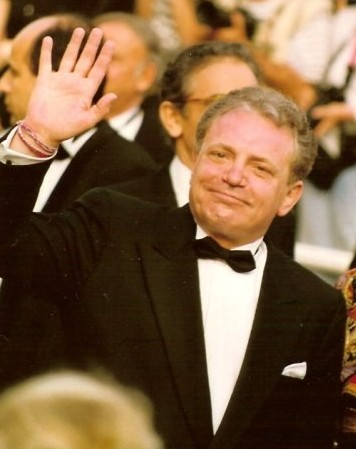
- Jacques Martin at the 1992 Cannes Film Festival
- Born: 22 June 1933; Lyon, France
- Died: 14 September 2007 (aged 74); Biarritz, France
- Resting place: Guillotière Cemetery, Lyon
- Spouse(s): Anne Lefèvre; Cécilia Ciganer-Albéniz; Céline Boisson
- Partner: Danièle Évenou
- Children: 8

Jacques Martin (French pronunciation: [ʒak maʁtɛ̃]; 22 June 1933 – 14 September 2007) was a French television host and producer.

== Life and career ==
Martin was born in Lyon. In the late 1960s, he formed a comical duet of hosts on radio Europe 1 with French actor Jean Yanne.

In the early 1970s, he was the sidekick of Danièle Gilbert, the host of Midi Première. Martin created and hosted such popular satirical TV shows such as Le Petit Rapporteur ("The Little Snitch, 1975–1976, TF1) and La Lorgnette ("The Opera Glasses", 1976–1977, Antenne 2). He pursued a film career, writing and directing one film (Na!, 1973) and playing in others such as La Passante du Sans-Souci.

Throughout his career, Martin worked with several performers who went on to see success in French entertainment, such as Pierre Desproges, Stéphane Collaro, Laurent Ruquier or Laurent Gerra. He also created several television concepts, such as Le Petit Rapporteur and L'École des Fans.

He was a regular of the radio show Les Grosses Têtes.

Until 1998, he hosted the entire afternoon of France 2 on Sundays, with a show called Dimanche Martin.

=== Illness/death ===
Martin died, aged 74, from cancer, on 14 September 2007 in the Hôtel du Palais, Biarritz, where he had settled. He is buried in Guillotière Cemetery in Lyon.

=== Family and children ===
He was married and divorced twice; his second wife, Cécilia Ciganer-Albéniz, was the second wife of French president Nicolas Sarkozy and France's first lady.

He had eight children from four different women all of whom survived him:

- with his first wife Anne Lefèvre, he had two children: David Martin, cook and television host and Élise Martin.
- with actress Danièle Évenou, he had two sons: Frédéric Martin, a radio host, and Jean-Baptiste Martin, actor.
- with his second wife Cécilia Ciganer-Albéniz, he had two daughters: Judith Martin and Jeanne-Marie Martin.
- with his last wife, Céline Boisson, he had two children: Juliette Martin and Clovis Martin.
