= Naomi Salaman =

British conceptual artist

Naomi Salaman (born 25 March 1963) is a British conceptual artist, writer and curator. Her practice uses photography and is informed both by feminism and post-structuralism. She attended Chelsea College of Arts, and completed a research/practice PhD at Goldsmiths in 2008. She currently teaches in Fine Art at University of Brighton. Salaman has written, made work on and/or curated exhibitions related to a wide range of topics including: the art school; pornography and censorship; image technologies; and social justice. She has taught studio art and art theory courses in art and photography schools nationally, and has taught fine art at University of Brighton since 1996.

== Exhibitions ==
Salaman curated the exhibition What She Wants: Women Artists Look at Men in 1994, which presented a collection of female artists exploring the gendered gaze by taking male nude photography. The work has been regarded as a good example of how the gendered gaze can support a change in power relations. Barbara Bickel found that the exhibition was one of few examples where women artists used male bodies in their practices to expose sexual desire and pleasure. This touring photographic exhibition has been regarded as a crucial exhibition on "how women looked at men".

Salaman's work, Changed Press Marks of the Private Cases (2001), was exhibited alongside ten artists in the Potential: Ongoing Archive, curated by Anna Harding in the John Hansard Gallery of the University of Southampton. Salaman used microfilm to record archivist cards related to private cases in the British Library. The library believed some materials were not suitable for public access and therefore kept them away in private cases. The photographed cards traced how archivists gradually removed the ban from some books.

Other exhibitions and works:

- Recent issue: a Survey of Recent British Photography in conjunction with Creative Camera (touring exhibition), Akehurst Gallery, 1994
- What She Wants (touring exhibition), Stills Gallery, 1995
- Nothing is Hidden, collaborated with Hermione Wiltshire, 2000.
- Looking Back at the Life Room, co-curated by Nina Pearlman and Naomi Salaman, Strang Room, University of London, 2010

== Books and edited books ==
- What She Wants: Women Artists Look at Men, Naomi Salaman ed., Verso, 1994. ISBN 978-0860914914
- Postcards on Photography: Photorealism and the Reproduction, Naomi Salaman & Ronnie Simpson, Cambridge Darkroom Gallery, 1998. ISBN 978-0947532253

== Thesis ==
- Salaman, Naomi (2008). Looking back at the life room; revisiting Pevsner's Academies of Art Past and Present, to reconsider the illustrations and construct photographs representing the curriculum (PDF) (Thesis thesis). University of London (Goldsmiths College London).

== Journal articles ==
- Salaman, Naomi (2015). "Art Theory - handmaiden of neoliberalism?". Journal of Visual Art Practice. Vol. 14, no. 2. pp. 162–173. doi:10.1080/14702029.2015.1060067.
