= Oread (poem) =

1914 poem by Hilda Doolittle

"Oread" is a poem by Hilda Doolittle, originally published under the name H. D. Imagiste. It is one of her earliest and best-known poems, and was first published in the founding issue of BLAST on 20 June 1914. The title Oread (cf. Oread) was added after the poem was first written, to suggest that a nymph was ordering up the sea.

== Text ==
Whirl up, sea—
whirl your pointed pines,
splash your great pines
on our rocks,
hurl your green over us,
cover us with your pools of fir.

== "Oread" as Imagist poem ==
"Oread" may serve to illustrate some prominent features of Imagist poetry. Rejecting the rhetorics of Late Romanticism and Victorianism, the Imagists aimed at a renewal of language through extreme reduction. This reduction is what Ezra Pound had in mind, when he wrote, counseling future poets: "use no superfluous word, no adjective, which does not reveal something".

In this poem, the reduction is brought to such an extreme that two images are superimposed on each other, depriving the reader of the possibility to determine, which is the "primary" one. The two image domains relevant here are the sea and the forest. The Oread, apparently the speaker of the poem, expresses her wish that the sea unite with the land. But while from the first line it seems clear that the sea is addressed, the second line counters this impression with the "pointed pines" of a forest. The anaphoric link between the first two lines and the use of epistrophe in the second and third lines enhance the connection between the two domains and much the same might be said about the expression "pools of fir" in the last line.
