= Hermine de Clermont-Tonnerre =

French writer and actor (1966–2020)

Princess Hermine
- Born: Marie-Hermine Antoinette de Clermont-Tonnerre; 3 February 1966; Boulogne-Billancourt, France
- Died: 3 July 2020 (aged 54); Le Kremlin-Bicêtre, France
- Spouse: Alastair Cuddeford (m. 1999; div. 2009)
- Issue: Allegra Cuddeford; Calixte Cuddeford
- House: Clermont-Tonnerre
- Father: Charles Henri, 11th Duke and 9th Prince of Clermont-Tonnerre
- Mother: Anne Moranvillé
- Occupation: Actress, stylist, etiquette writer, socialite

Princess Marie-Hermine Antoinette Hermine de Clermont-Tonnerre (3 February 1966 – 3 July 2020) was a French socialite, stylist, etiquette writer and actress. She was member of the House of Clermont-Tonnerre, a French noble family.

== Biography ==
Hermine was the daughter of Charles Henri, 11th Duke and 9th Prince of Clermont-Tonnerre, and Anne Moranvillé. She was also the sister of the current Duke of Clermont-Tonnerre. Her family are part of the French nobility and were added into the papal nobility in 1823.

De Clermont-Tonnerre became a stylist for Dior at age 22 before founding an event communication company. In 1996, she published her first book, titled Politesse oblige : le savoir-vivre aujourd'hui. She published numerous other autobiographical texts in the 2000s for JC Lattès. She took part in the 6th Rallye des Princesses, an automotive event reserved for women driving vintage cars from Paris to Monaco each year. In 2009, she paired up with Valérie Bénaïm.

In 1999, de Clermont-Tonnerre married Alastair Cuddeford, with whom she had two children: Allegra and Calixte. The couple split up in July 2009.

De Clermont-Tonnerre was a contestant on two reality TV shows: La Ferme Célébrités (2010) and Fear Factor (2004). She was a judge for Miss France in 2003 and was invited several times to appear on C'est mon choix, J'y vais... j'y vais pas ?, and others.

== Death ==
On 2 June 2020, Hermine de Clermont-Tonnerre was involved in a serious motorcycle crash and was immediately placed into a coma. She died of her injuries on 3 July 2020 at Bicêtre Hospital at the age of 54.

== Filmography ==
- Alliance cherche doigt (1997)
- Riches, belles, etc. (1998)
- Trois zéros (2002)

== Works ==
De Clermont-Tonnerre wrote under the name Princess Hermine de Clermont-Tonnerre.

- Politesse oblige : Le Savoir-Vivre aujourd'hui (1996)
- Un jour mon prince viendra, mais où, quand, comment ? : Savoir-aimer (2001)
- Politesse oblige : savoir-vivre au xxie siècle (2003)
- Mon prince est venu : pour un temps, pour longtemps, ou pour toujours ? (2005)
- L'Art et la manière du discours de mariage (2009)

=== Prefaces ===
- Comment je suis devenu un supermondain : Rallyes, bottin mondain, bal des Debs... Le parcours très secret des pros de l'incruste by Éric Bonnet (2008)
