= Les Oréades =

Painting by William-Adolphe Bouguereau

The Oreads
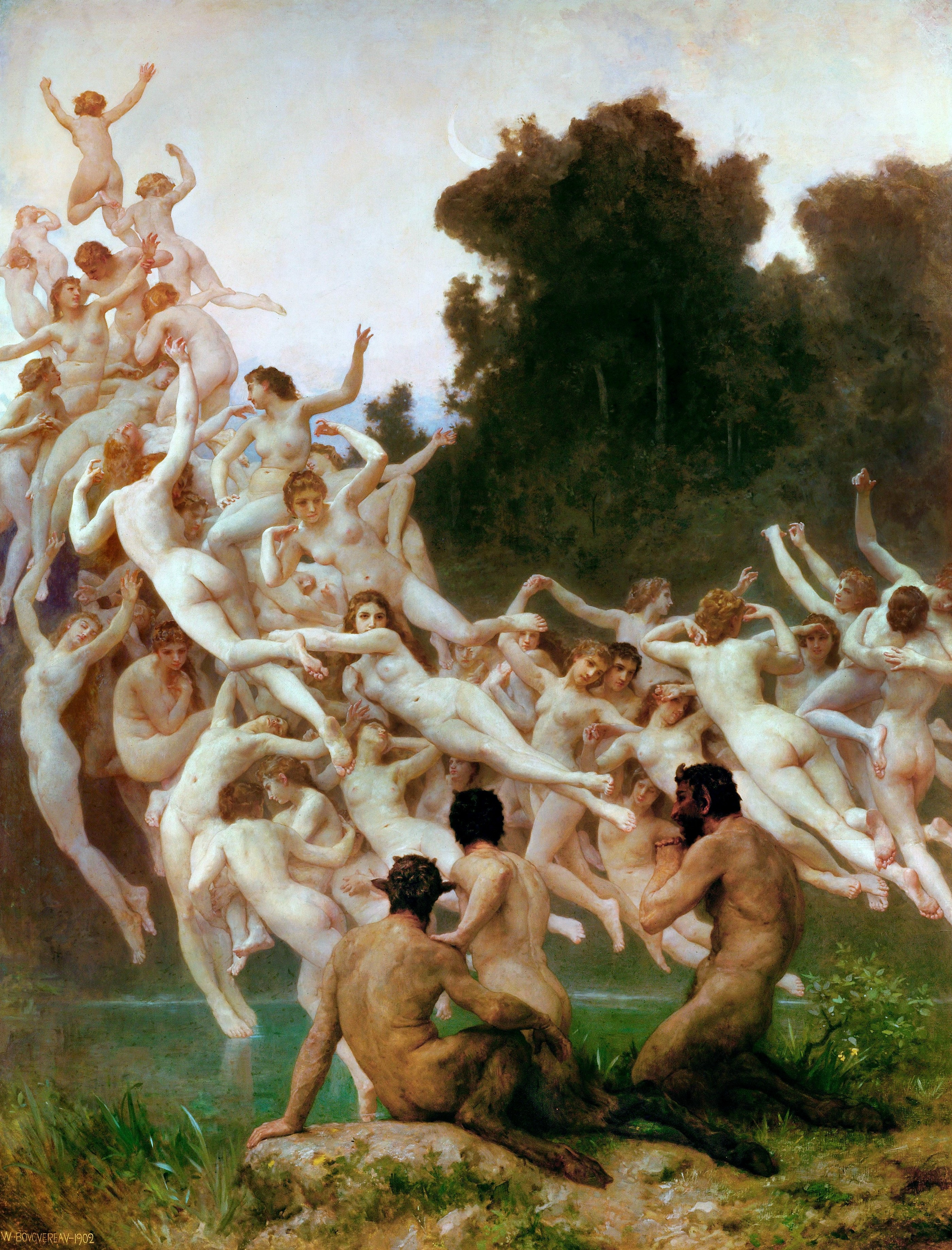
- Artist: William-Adolphe Bouguereau
- Year: 1902
- Medium: Oil on canvas
- Dimensions: 237.5 cm × 181.5 cm (93.5 in × 71.5 in)
- Location: Musée d'Orsay, Paris
- Accession: RF 2010 4
- Website: www.musee-orsay.fr/en/artworks/les-oreades-153688

The Oreads (French: Les Oréades) is an oil painting by the French artist William-Adolphe Bouguereau. It was painted in 1902 and its dimensions are 237.5 × 181.5 cm.

In 2009 the descendants of the artist donated the artwork to the Musée d'Orsay in Paris, where it is now exhibited.

== Description ==
The Oreads is a mythological painting and it is one of Bouguereau's best-known works. The painting includes many nude females, a characteristic seen in many of Bouguereau's artworks. It is painted in a Neoclassical style which features mythological Roman and Greek nymphs and satyrs.

The Oreads is named after the nymph of the mountains, the Oreads, also known as Orestiads. In Greek mythology, these creatures are led by the Greek Moon goddess of the hunt named Artemis, one of the most venerated ancient Greek deities. In ancient Rome she was known as Diana. Artemis or Diana prefers to stay on the mountainside; that is the reason the Oreads are always her companion. Oreads are lively creatures who hunt wild animals such as boar and birds with their arrows. Under Diana's guidance, the Oreads line themselves behind her in a luminous form. The painting shows the Oreads ascending into the sky while three satyrs watch them, seemingly mystified at the sight. A commentary for the title of the painting quotes:

The shadows are dissipating; dawn appears, radiant, and colours the mountain tops pink. Then a long procession soars up into the sky: it is the joyful band of nymphs who, during the night, frolicked in the shadow of the forests and by the still waters of the river; they take to the air, watched by the astonished fauns, to return to their own realm and the ethereal regions inhabited by the gods.

— Salon, 1902 catalogue

In this painting, Bouguereau expresses his attachment to his traditional and academic artwork. Another of his artworks, entitled The Assault, is in the same style as The Oreads, where the artist shows the natural expression of the human body and its attitudes. The mythological figures in this painting show the erotic side of Bouguereau's artwork, where satyrs openly stare at the nymphs. Experts were astonished by the artist's work and hailed it as his masterpiece. Even now the painting is reproduced in large numbers to sell all over the world.
