= Gertrude Reif Hughes =

American college professor (1936–2022)

- Gertrude Reif, from a 1957 engagement announcement in The New York Times
- Born: Geertrui Bernadette Reif; April 22, 1936; Bergen, The Netherlands
- Died: January 4, 2022; Waterford, Connecticut, U.S.
- Occupation: College professor

Gertrude Reif Hughes (April 22, 1936 – January 4, 2022) was an American college professor. She taught English at Wesleyan University from 1976 to 2006, and was one of the founders of the school's women's studies program. She was also a noted scholar of anthroposophy.

== Early life and education ==
Geertrui (Gertrude) Bernadette Reif was born in Bergen, the Netherlands, one of the three daughters of Paul Reif and Maria Reif. She and her family emigrated to the United States in 1940. She was raised in New York City. She graduated from the George School, and from Mount Holyoke College in 1958. She earned two master's degrees at Wesleyan University, and completed doctoral studies at Yale University in 1976, with a dissertation directed by Harold Bloom.

== Career ==
Hughes taught high school English after college. She was a member of the English department faculty at Wesleyan University for thirty years, from 1976 until she retired with full professor status in 2006. She was one of the founders, and chair, of the women's studies program at Wesleyan. She was also on the faculty of the Sunbridge Institute. In addition to her academic pursuits, Hughes was a serious student of anthroposophy. She chaired the board of the Anthroposophic Press, was president of the Rudolf Steiner summer institute, and published on Rudolf Steiner's philosophy. In 2012 she gave an oral history interview for the Wesleyan Oral History Project.

== Publications ==
- Emerson's Demanding Optimism (1984)
- ""Imagining the Existence of Something Uncreated: Elements of Emerson in Adrienne Rich's Dream of a Common Language"
- "Subverting the Cult of Domesticity: Emily Dickinson's Critique of Women's Work" (1986)
- "Making it Really New: Hilda Doolittle, Gwendolyn Brooks, and the Feminist Potential of Modern Poetry" (1990)
- "Rudolf Steiner's activist epistemology and its relation to feminist thought in America" (2012)
- More Radiant than the Sun: A Handbook for Working with Steiner's Meditations and Exercises (2013)

== Personal life ==
Gertrude Reif married Robert Gerald Hughes in 1958. They had four children and divorced in 1981. Her son Ken died in 2014. She died in Waterford, Connecticut, in 2022, at the age of 81, after several years of Alzheimer's disease.
