= La Ferme Célébrités season 1 =

2004 French television series

La Ferme Célébrités
- Season 1
- No. of days: 70
- No. of housemates: 14
- Winner: Pascal Olmeta
- Runner-up: Eve Angelie

Season chronology
- Next → P.C series 2

The first French reality TV show La Ferme Célébrités, season was broadcast between 10 April 2004 and 18 June 2004 on TF1. It was presented by Christophe Dechavanne and Patrice Carmouze. Won by Pascal Olmeta who won €180,000 for the association "Williams in Corsica" of the Williams syndrome research.

== Contestant ==
| Celebrity | Famous for | Finished |
|---|---|---|
| Pascal Olmeta | Football player | Winner |
| Eve Angeli | Singer | Runner Up |
| Elodie Gossuin | Model, Miss France 2001 and Miss Europe 2002 | Finalist |
| Vincent McDoom | Model, transvestite and TV presenter | 11th evicted |
| Danièle Gilbert | TV presenter | 10th evicted |
| Sébastien Moura | Model | 9th evicted |
| Ilario Calvo | TV presenter | 8th evicted |
| Mouss Diouf | Actor | 7th walked |
| Céline Balitran | Model, TV presenter and George Clooney's ex-fiancee | 6th evicted |
| Maxime | Humorist | 5th evicted |
| Titia | Model | 4th evicted |
| Massimo Gargia | Jet setter | 3rd walked |
| Mia Frye | Professional dancer and actress | 2nd evicted |
| Eva Kowalska | Paul-Loup Sulitzer's wife | 1st evicted |

=== Nominations ===
| | Week 1 | Week 2 | Week 3 | Week 4 | Week 5 | Week 6 | Week 7 | Week 8 | Week 9 | Week 10 |
|---|---|---|---|---|---|---|---|---|---|---|
| Pascal | Massimo; Titia | Ilario; Ève | Ève; Titia | Ilario; Maxime | Ève; Danièle | Ilario; Ève | Danièle; Sébastien | Danièle; Ève | Not eligible | Winner (Day 70) |
| Ève | Massimo; Vincent | Céline; Maxime | Maxime; Sébastien | Mouss; Céline | Mouss; Céline | Ilario; Sébastien | Vincent; Sébastien | Danièle; Élodie | Vincent; Élodie | Runner-up (Day 70) |
| Élodie | Massimo; Mia | Mia; Ilario | Ève; Titia | Danièle; Vincent | Danièle; Vincent | Vincent; Ève | Danièle; Vincent | Danièle; Ève | Not eligible | Third place (Day 70) |
| Vincent | Maxime; Ève | Ève; Titia | Titia; Maxime | Sébastien; Maxime | Ilario; Élodie | Ilario; Sébastien | Élodie; Sébastien | Ève; Pascal | Not eligible | Evicted (Day 63) |
| Danièle | Massimo; Ève | Mia; Ilario | Ève; Titia | Sébastien; Maxime | Céline; Ilario | Ilario; Sébastien | Sébastien; Élodie | Élodie; Pascal | Evicted (Day 56) | |
| Sébastien | Massimo; Mia | Ilario; Mia | Ève; Titia | Vincent; Danièle | Danièle; Vincent | Ève; Vincent | Ève; Vincent | Evicted (Day 49) | | |
| Ilario | Ève; Massimo | Sébastien; Titia | Titia; Maxime | Maxime; Sébastien | Céline; Danièle | Vincent; Ève | Evicted (Day 42) | | | |
| Mouss | Massimo; Éva | Danièle; Ève | Ève; Titia | Danièle; Sébastien | Danièle; Pascal | Walked (Day 36) | | | | |
| Céline | Massimo; Ève | Ève; Ilario | Ève; Titia | Danièle; Ilario | Danièle; Ève | Evicted (Day 35) | | | | |
| Maxime | Massimo; Ève | Mia; Ilario | Ève; Danièle | Ilario; Vincent | Evicted (Day 28) | | | | | |
| Titia | Massimo; Mia | Mia; Ilario | Céline; Vincent | Evicted (Day 21) | | | | | | |
| Massimo | Maxime; Sébastien | Céline; Éva | Walked (Day 14) | | | | | | | |
| Mia | Éva; Massimo | Maxime; Sébastien | Evicted (Day 14) | | | | | | | |
| Eva | Massimo; Pascal | Evicted (Day 7) | | | | | | | | |
| Up for eviction | Éva; Massimo | Mia; Ilario | Titia; Ève | Sébastien; Maxime | Danièle; Céline | Ève; Ilario | Vincent; Sébastien | Danièle; Ève | Vincent; Élodie | Pascal; Ève; Élodie |
| Walked | none | Massimo | none | | Mouss | none | | | | |
| Evicted | Éva; 45% to save | Mia; 29% to save | Titia; 22% to save | Maxime; 30% to save | Céline; 46% to save | Ilario; 25% to save | Sébastien; 27% to save | Danièle; 41% to save | Vincent; 48% to save | Élodie; 16% to win |
| Evicted | Éva; 45% to save | Mia; 29% to save | Titia; 22% to save | Maxime; 30% to save | Céline; 46% to save | Ilario; 25% to save | Sébastien; 27% to save | Danièle; 41% to save | Vincent; 48% to save | Ève; 27% to win |
| Evicted | Éva; 45% to save | Mia; 29% to save | Titia; 22% to save | Maxime; 30% to save | Céline; 46% to save | Ilario; 25% to save | Sébastien; 27% to save | Danièle; 41% to save | Vincent; 48% to save | Pascal; 57% to win |
