= Emma Watson (disambiguation) =

Emma Watson (born 1990) is an English actress.

Emma Watson may also refer to:

- Emma Watson (footballer) (born 2006), Scottish footballer
- Emma Watson, the protagonist of The Watsons, an unfinished novel by Jane Austen
- Emma Watson: The Watsons Completed, a completion of Austen's novel by Joan Aiken
- Emma Watson, a character in Tess Gerritsen's 1999 novel Gravity
- Emma Watson, a recurring character in the American TV series The Andy Griffith Show

== See also ==
- Emily Sibley Watson, an American philanthropist and patron of the arts
- Emily Watson, British actress
