= 685 Hermia =

S-type asteroid native to the asteroid belt

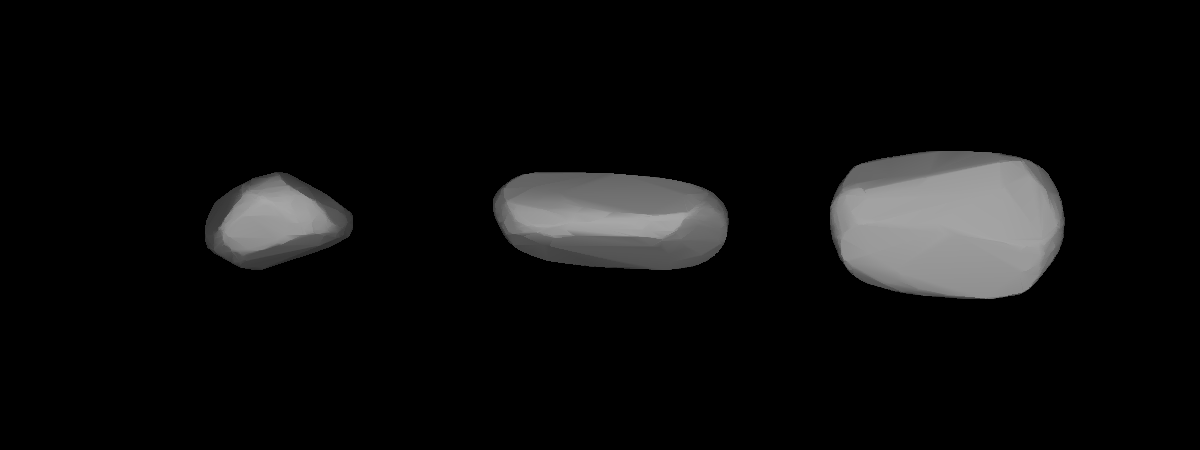
- A three-dimensional model of 685 Hermia based on its light curve

Discovery
- Discovered by: W. Lorenz
- Discovery site: Heidelberg Obs.
- Discovery date: 12 August 1909

Designations
- Alternative designations: 1909 HE

Orbital characteristics
- Epoch 31 July 2016 (JD 2457600.5)
- Uncertainty parameter 0
- Observation arc: 89.52 yr (32696 d)
- Aphelion: 2.6752 AU (400.20 Gm)
- Perihelion: 1.7969 AU (268.81 Gm)
- Semi-major axis: 2.2360 AU (334.50 Gm)
- Eccentricity: 0.19640
- Orbital period (sidereal): 3.34 yr (1221.3 d)
- Mean anomaly: 4.11590°
- Mean motion: 0° 17^{m} 41.208^{s} / day
- Inclination: 3.6466°
- Longitude of ascending node: 235.210°
- Argument of perihelion: 80.876°

Physical characteristics
- Mean radius: 5.475±0.45 km
- Synodic rotation period: 50.40 ± 0.05 h (2.1000 ± 0.0021 d)
- Geometric albedo: 0.2807±0.050
- Absolute magnitude (H): 12.0

685 Hermia is an S-type asteroid belonging to the Flora family in the Main Belt. Its diameter is about 11 km and it has an albedo of 0.281.
