= Robert Nataf =

French chemist

Robert Nataf is a French chemist and the director and founder of the Laboratoire Philippe Auguste in Paris, known for his controversial 2006 study proposing an association between childhood autism and environmental toxins, particularly mercury. Nataf has promoted the notion that mercury toxicity may be a cause of autism at various conferences, such as at the United States Autism and Asperger Association's annual conference. He has also, along with Mark Geier, conducted further research regarding the potential link between mercury toxicity and autism, as manifested in differences in the levels of certain urinary porphyrins. However, Kevin Leitch of the blog LeftBrainRightBrain has questioned Nataf's research, arguing that precoproporphyrin levels were not, as Nataf had assumed in his 2006 paper, necessarily indicative of mercury toxicity. Other critics have noted that Laboratoire Auguste Philippe sells porphyrin tests and that Nataf therefore may have a conflict of interest.

== Education ==
Nataf received his MD from Paris Diderot University.
