= Mallaury Nataf =

French singer and actress

- Born: Marie-Laurence Nataf; 19 March 1972 (age 54); Lille, France
- Other names: Mallory Nataf, Malorie Nataf

Mallaury Nataf (a.k.a. Mallory Nataf) (born Marie-Laurence Nataf, 19 March 1972) is a French singer and actress.

== Biography ==
=== Personal life ===
Mallaury Nataf was born in Lille, France. She spent her childhood between Lille and Nice and her parents divorced when she was young. Before playing in television shows, she attended law and business studies.

=== Career ===
She began her career in the sitcom Le Miel et les Abeilles, produced by AB Productions in late 1992 until 1994. Like other AB Productions like Hélène Rolles, she released a track single produced by AB Productions (Les Filles, c'est très compliqué).

In spring 1994, she sang her title Fleur sauvage without underwear under her short dress on a children show - the Jacky Show - and images from the show triggered a public scandal. Late 1994, she left Le Miel et les Abeilles and decided to get out from the AB Productions system.

Then she played in some movies for television, like Une femme explosive (1996) with Roger Hanin and she played in the first ten episodes of Saint Tropez (Sous le soleil into French television) in 1996 .

She also played in the movie Les Deux Papas et la Maman with Smaïn, Arielle Dombasle and Antoine de Caunes.

In 1998, she hosted Cinémascope on the musical cable channel MCM.

She released a CD for children during the Christmas holidays in 1999: Malorie Noël 2000. She played a dozen of theatre pieces from 1992 to 2000. In 2001, she re-attended law studies for some months.

In spring 2005, she was one of the contestants of the real TV la Ferme Célébrités 2 on TF1, and she was eliminated at the end of the first week, she also played in the movie ADN from Judith Cahen.

Her life has since taken an unfortunate turn; in February 2012, she admitted in an interview with Le Parisien that she was homeless, and that her two oldest children had been put into the custody of their respective fathers. Later, she and her youngest son, Shiloh, were found by Parisian police sleeping in the road in the 3rd arrondissement in Paris. They were not immediately recognized, but later were identified, and 3 year old Shiloh was taken out of his mother's custody.

== Filmography ==
Film
Year	Film	Role	Notes
1993	Jacques le Fataliste (Jacques the Fatalist)	Sylvie	
1994	Long Life Together (Siete mil días juntos)	Uncredited	
1996	Les deux papas et la maman (Two Dads and One Mom)	Clarisse	
1996	Al centro dell'area di rigore (Forza Roma)	Nini	
1998	Scalp	Unknown	Short film
1999	Oeil pour Oeil	Unknown	Short film
2001	Adieu Babylone	Unknown	
2005	ADN	Herself	Documentary
2006	Bleu blanc rouge	Airport voice #1	
Television
Year	Title	Role	Notes
1992–1994	Le Miel et les Abeilles	Lola Garnier	166 episodes
1994	Les filles d'à côté	Herself	1 episode
1995	Le groom	Sonia	Television movie
1995	Une famille en or (Des copains en or)	Lola Garnier	Special episode Le Miel et les Abeilles
1996	Une femme explosive	Isabelle	Television movie
1996	Saint Tropez (Sous le Soleil)	Sandra	13 episodes
2005–2006	Les coulisses du show-business	Herself	

== Singer ==
- 1993: Les filles c'est très compliqué, single (+ Fleur sauvage)
- 2000: Malorie Noël 2000

== Private life ==
In the 1990s, she dated Hervé Noel, a former TV presenter and actor.

In 1998, she gave birth to a boy called Raphaël and in 2000, she gave birth to a girl named Angeline In July 2009, she gave birth at home to a boy with her new boyfriend called Abraham.
