= Hermine Naghdalyan =

Armenian politician

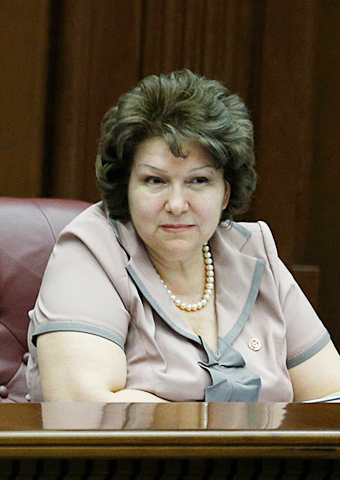

Hermine Naghdalyan (Armenian: Հերմինե Նաղդալյան 28 July 1960) is an Armenian economist and politician who is deputy speaker of the National Assembly.

== Early life and education ==
Naghdalyan was born on 28 July 1960 in Yerevan. She has a PhD in economics from the Yerevan Institute of National Economy.

Naghdalyan was elected to the National Assembly to represent district 49 for the Republican party in 1995. She is a member of the Standing Committee on State and Legal Affairs and the Standing Committee on Economic Affairs. On 31 May 2012 she was elected Deputy Speaker of the National Assembly. In 2014, she became temporary de facto President of Armenia for three days while President Serzh Sargsyan and Speaker Hovik Abrahamyan were out of the country.

Naghdalyan was head of the Armenia–US parliamentary friendship group. In 2015, Ambassador Richard M. Mills, Jr. called for her to step down due to her membership of the Russian 'Griboyedov' Club and she submitted her resignation.

Naghdalyan is the head of the Armenian delegation to the Parliamentary Assembly of the Council of Europe (PACE) On 25 February 2011 she was elected chair of the PACE committee on Economic Affairs and Development and in January 2016 she became a Vice President of PACE, presiding over the fall session.

Naghdalyan is head of the Republican Party Women's Council, which is an elected observer member of the European People's Party.

== Personal life ==
Naghdalyan is married to Davit Beglaryan and they have five children. In 2016, their company Sisian BUAT received a government contract for road construction works worth over 636 million drams ($1.3 million).

== Awards ==
- Mkhitar Gosh medal 2011
- Friendship Order of the Russian Federation, 2014
