= Hermione-class frigate (French Navy) =

Class overview
- Name: Hermione
- Builders: Brest
- Operators: French Navy
- Planned: 2
- Completed: 2

General characteristics
- Displacement: 350 tonnes
- Length: 37.4 metres (115 French feet)
- Beam: 9.7 metres (30 French feet)
- Sail plan: Full-rigged ship
- Armament: 30 guns
- Armour: Timber

A Hermione-class frigate was a type of 30-gun frigate of the French Navy, carrying a half-battery of 12-pounder long guns on the lower deck as its main armament, and a complete battery of 6-pounder guns on the upper deck. Two ships of this type were built in 1699 on plans by Blaise Pangalo. They were labelled "5th-rank frigates-ships" at the time.

== Ships ==
- Hermione

Builder: Brest
Begun: May 1699
Launched: 23 September 1699
Completed: early 1700
Fate: "Lost" about April 1705

- Méduse

Builder: Brest
Begun: May 1699
Launched: 24 September 1699
Completed: early 1700
Fate: Wrecked, either in 1733 at Port-Louis according to Vichot, or in the Indies in 1713.
