= Brevans =

Commune in Bourgogne-Franche-Comté, France

- Commune
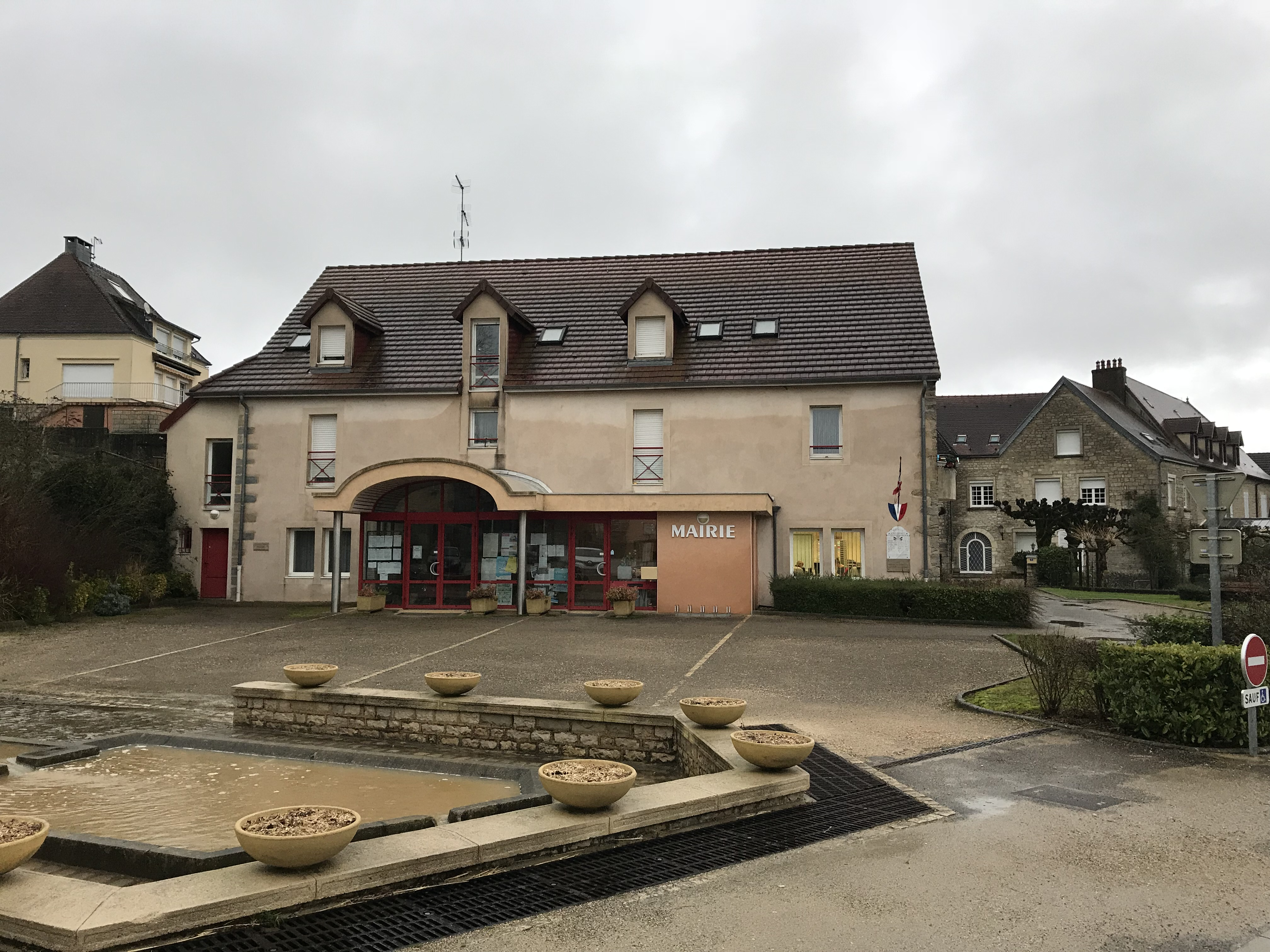
- The town hall in Brevans
- Location of Brevans
- Location within France Location within Bourgogne-Franche-Comté
- Coordinates: 47°05′51″N 5°31′28″E
- Country: France
- Region: Bourgogne-Franche-Comté
- Department: Jura
- Arrondissement: Dole
- Canton: Authume
- Intercommunality: CA Grand Dole

Government
  - Mayor (2020–2026): Denis Gindre
- Area^{1}: 3.62 km^{2} (1.40 sq mi)
- Highest elevation: 235 m (771 ft)
- Lowest elevation: 200 m (660 ft)
- Population (2023): 668
  - Density: 185/km^{2} (478/sq mi)
- Time zone: UTC+01:00 (CET)
  - Summer (DST): UTC+02:00 (CEST)
- INSEE/Postal code: 39078 /39100
- ^{1} French Land Register data, which excludes lakes, ponds, glaciers > 1 km^{2} (0.386 sq mi or 247 acres) and river estuaries.

Brevans (French pronunciation: [bʁəvɑ̃]) is a commune in the Jura department and Bourgogne-Franche-Comté region of eastern France.

== Population ==
Historical population
Year	Pop.	±% p.a.
1968	440	—
1975	406	−1.14%
1982	383	−0.83%
1990	610	+5.99%
1999	653	+0.76%
2007	626	−0.53%
2012	644	+0.57%
2017	669	+0.76%
2023	668	−0.02%
Source: INSEE

== See also ==
- Communes of the Jura department
