= Hermione Wiltshire =

English sculptor and photographer

Hermione Wiltshire (born 7 April 1963, in London) is an English sculptor and photographer.

Wiltshire studied at the Central Saint Martins College of Art and Design and the Chelsea School of Art, completing her education in 1987. In 1992, she was artist in residence at the Tate Liverpool. She is senior lecturer in photography at the Royal College of Art (2008) and acting head of the photography programme (2011–12).

Wiltshire's work treats the photograph as a sculptural object and approaches issues in sexuality, including pornography, the male gaze, and women's self-image, from a feminist perspective.

She collaborated with Naomi Salaman on the exhibition Nothing is Hidden, 2000.
