= Hermine Speier =

German classical archaeologist

- Born: 28 May 1898; Frankfurt am Main
- Died: 12 January 1989 (aged 90); Montreux

Academic background
- Education: University of Frankfurt, University of Giessen, University of Heidelberg
- Thesis: Die Gruppen angelehnter Figuren im V. und IV. Jahrhundert
- Doctoral advisor: Ludwig Curtius
- Influences: Gerhart Rodenwaldt, Eberhard Gothein, Friedrich Gundolf, Karl Jaspers, Hermann Oncken, Hans Driesch, Karl Hampe

Academic work
- Institutions: Vatican Museums
- Main interests: archaeology

Hermine "Erminia" Speier (28 May 1898 in Frankfurt am Main – 12 January 1989 in Montreux) was a German archaeologist. One of the few female archaeologists of her time, she was the first female employee of the Vatican Museums and one of the first professional women to be employed by the Vatican. She was a pioneering contributor to the collections of archaeological photographs and is often credited as being the first archaeological photo-archivist.

== Biography ==
Hermine Speier was born on 28 May 1898, in Frankfurt am Main into a wealthy Jewish family. She attended Frankfurt's Viktoriaschule, passing her matriculation examination in Wiesbaden after attending a private school. In the winter semester of 1918/19 she enrolled at the University of Frankfurt, studying history, German literature and philosophy. In the summer semester of 1919 she transferred to the University of Giessen, and in the winter semester 1919/20 continued at the University of Heidelberg. In Giessen, she also attended a teachers' training course and was introduced to classical archaeology at the college run by Gerhart Rodenwaldt. In Heidelberg she changed her major to archaeology. She studied under teachers such as Eberhard Gothein, Friedrich Gundolf, Karl Jaspers, Hermann Oncken, Hans Driesch and Karl Ludwig Hampe. After 1920, when Ludwig Curtius was appointed to the university, he became her most important teacher and patron, helping her to focus on archaeology. Besides Curtius, teachers such as Franz Boll, Alfred von Domaszewski, Karl Meister and especially Bernhard Schweitzer gave her a broad-based knowledge of antiquity.

=== Early career ===
Speier graduated with a doctorate in archaeology and a double minor in ancient history and classical philology in 1925 under Curtius with a dissertation titled Die Gruppen angelehnter Figuren im V. und IV. Jahrhundert. The work was published seven years later in Rome under the title Two figure groups in the fifth and fourth century BC. The work contrasts differences in images between the Archaic and Hellenistic periods of Greek art. Working in the tradition of Johann Joachim Winckelmann's methodology, she used scientific analysis to show that art reflected the historical development of culture and government. Curtius was so impressed with her work, that he stated: "If it were possible, I would give her the best mark for this excellent performance, but it is reserved for those of the male nature". She was the only woman to achieve a doctorate under Curtius. After graduating she began working as an assistant to Bernhard Schweitzer in Königsberg until 1928, when Curtius recruited her to help with the photographic archive at the German Archaeological Institute (German: Deutsches Archäologisches Institut) (DAI) in Rome.

Curtius was at that time the Director of the Institute and was still in the process of constructing the photographic archive. Speier was entrusted with organizing the photographic archive ("Fotothek"), with her assistant Adolf Greifenhagen. The initial collection was based on a gift of photographs by Walther Amelung. Her work, which systematically ordered the photos, has earned her the distinction as the first archaeological photo-archivist and earned her wide professional recognition at the time from other libraries. When Hitler came to power, he removed all Jews from civil service positions with the passage of the Law for the Restoration of the Professional Civil Service, and precipitously she was offered the chance to build a photographic archive at the Vatican by the Director-General of the Vatican Museums, Bartolomeo Nogara. She left the DAI in 1934, joined the staff at the Vatican and became one of the first women employed by the Holy See. Pope Pius XI signed her contract, though initially it was for no fixed term and at a daily rate, as both a statement against Nazi antisemitism and the taboo of employing women. The timing of her hiring coincided with the first administration of the Museum's collections by a scientist. Prior to Nogaras, the collections were jointly managed by Guido Galli, who was a sculptor and the painter Biagio Biagetti.

=== Vatican archivist ===
The first task was to divide the 20,000 photographic negatives into three separate collections named Classical Archaeology, Medieval and Modern Times, and Ethnographic Missions. Then she and her colleagues, archaeologist Filippo Magi and the art historian Deoclecio Redig de Campos, began to classify the images, and deal with the constant flow of incoming new photographs. In 1935, the Marchese Benedetto Guglielmo donated a private Etruscan art collection to Pope Pius XI. Speier was assigned to organize the collection. Of particular importance, she established two halls with 17 original Greek sculptures from the collection and worked on the Roman refurbishment of the Greek vase collection and the Antiquarium. During the mid-1930s, Speier spent considerable time in Germany traveling annually to visit her family. In 1937, her letters to her lover, Italian General, airship pioneer and Arctic explorer Umberto Nobile, indicated that she was in Frankfurt for an extended period, and then in 1938, she spent time in Basel and Geneva before returning to Frankfurt. Hitler's first meeting with Mussolini took place in Rome in May 1938, but Speier was not back in Rome until July. Then in September, she was in the Tuscan town of Chianciano Terme. Pope Pius XI died on 10 February 1939 and Speier converted to Catholicism later that year with Pope Pius XII immediately renewing her employment. Although she was intensely occupied with her work at the Vatican, she often considered emigrating to the United States, where her mother and sister lived, or to Brazil. During this early period of his papacy, Pius XII granted 3,000 visas to Jews, if they had been baptized, to emigrate to Brazil, though the only evidence found linking Speier and Pius XII at this time was, in her correspondence, his congratulatory telegram on her conversion. Throughout 1939 and 1940, Nobile was in the United States and Speier remained in Rome until the summer of 1940, when she took a retreat to Chianciano. After 1940, correspondence between the two was sparse as they feared censors and writing had become increasingly impractical.

Nobile returned to Rome in May 1942 and her family severed communication with Speier after learning of her Catholic baptism, effectively ending her reasons for emigration. During the German occupation of Rome 1943/1944 Pope Pius XII made arrangements for Giulio Belvederi, nephew of the former Pontifical Master of Ceremonies Pietro Respighi, to hide Speier in the Catacombs of St. Priscilla, under the nunnery. Hiding in the catacombs saved Speier from the Raid of the Ghetto of Rome on 16 October 1943 in which more than 1,000 Jews were deported to Auschwitz and all save 16 were killed. During this part of the war, the Museum was closed, until the end of September 1944, and many artworks from war-torn areas were shipped to the Vatican for storage. When it reopened, she continued with her work creating a detailed monuments inventory of the Vatican holdings, which resulted in several important finds. In 1946, in an antiquities storage facility, she found a horse head sculpted by Phidias which was originally from one of the pediments of the Parthenon. On further examination, it was established from its weathering that it was in fact the second horse of Athena's chariot on the western gable, where the dispute between Athena and Poseidon over the land of Attica is depicted. Speier also discovered the two so-called ancient Aurai statues that decorated the exterior of the Sala Rotonda when it was built in the 18th century. She published Die Skulpturen des Vaticanischen Museums (The Sculptures of the Vatican Museums) in 1956 about the find of the Parthenon horse's head, and earlier in 1950 had published a distinguished report concerning the excavations of St. Peter's Basilica in Herbig's Vermächtnis der Antiken Kunst (Legacy of Ancient Art) entitled "Die neuen Ausgrabungen unter der Peterskirche in Rom".

Speier was solely responsible for the collection of antiquities in the Vatican Museums, from 1961, and all of the photo-archives before 1966 were under her direction. With her appointment, a tradition was established of including one member from Germany in the central administration. She retired as archivist and director in 1967, being succeeded by Francesco Roncalli and Georg Daltrop. As a result of her immense knowledge of ancient monuments, from the mid-1950s until the early 1970s Speier was entrusted by the German Archaeological Institute with the publication of the fourth edition of Wolfgang Helbig's guide to the public collections of classical antiquities in Rome (Führer durch die öffentlichen Sammlungen klassischer Altertümer in Rom), which had not been updated in half a century. She expanded the guide's coverage, classifying the works into various groupings. She brought in several young experts to assist her, in particular Helga von Heintze, Klaus Parlasca, Erika Simon, Hans von Steuben, Dietrich Willers and Paul Zanker. She also translated the guide from Italian into German.

== Personal life ==
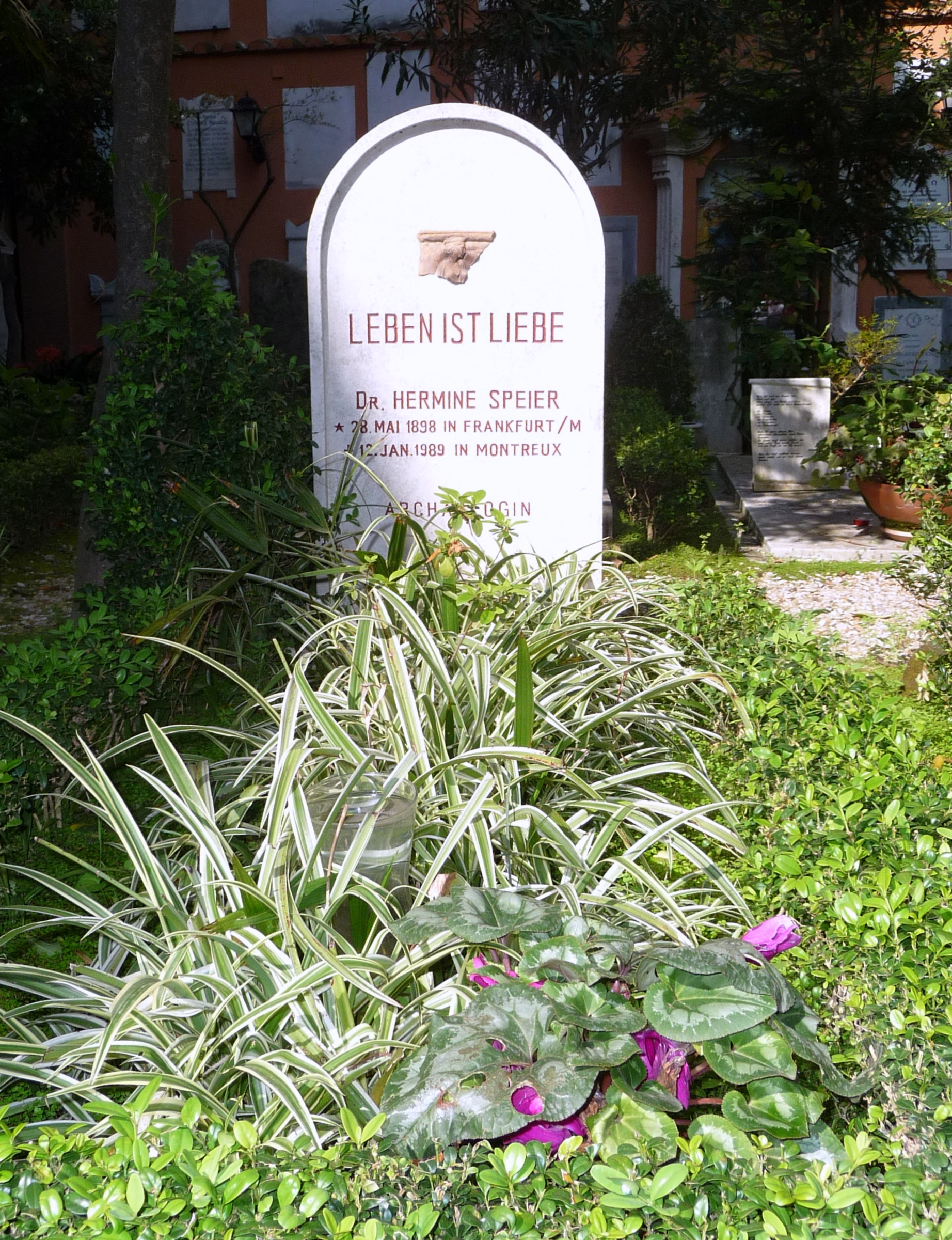
Grave of Hermine Speier in the Collegio Teutonico.

Speier was never married despite several betrothals. She lived near the Vatican on the Janiculum in a comfortable apartment with a roof terrace which had been put at her disposal by her lifelong patron Erich Boehringer. She held a cultural salon there, inviting guests such as Marie Luise Kaschnitz, who dedicated a poem to Speier; de:Engelbert Kirschbaum, a noted archaeology professor; Paul Augustin Mayer, a German Cardinal and Oriol Schädel, head of the Library of the Piazza di Monte Citorio, among others of the German and Italian intelligentsia. Speier was an active member of the German Archaeological Institute and the Pontifical Academy of Archaeology. In 1973, she was awarded the Cross of Merit of Germany. She received the Pro Ecclesia et Pontifice medal from the Vatican.

Speier died on 12 January 1989 in Montreux, Switzerland, and was buried in the Campo Santo Teutonico, the Vatican's Teutonic Cemetery. Her grave bears a piece of a Tarentum clay relief which she had wanted to publish about as early as 1937 in the Festschrift Corolla Ludwig Curtius. She had been unable to do so as Jews were excluded from the publication. Finally in 1955 she exhibited the piece from her private collection and published Fragment eines tarentinischen Tonreliefs in römischem Privatbesitz (Fragment of a Roman Tarentum clay relief in private property). Her gravestone also bears the inscription Leben ist Liebe (Life is Love).

== Selected works ==
- Speier, Hermine (1932). Zweifiguren-Gruppen im fünften und vierten Jahrhundert vor Christus (in German). Rome: Deutsches Archäologisches Institut. OCLC 45101115.
- Speier, H (1949). "Die Vatikanische Necropole unter den "Groten" des Petersdomes". Wort und Wahrheit (in German). 4 (2). Vienna, Austria: 481–489.
- Speier, Hermine (1950). Sonderdruck aus Vermaechtnis der Antiken Kunst. Fragment eines Pferdekopfes aus dem Westgiebel des Parthenon (in German). Heidelberg, Germany: Kerle Verlag. OCLC 80398457.
- Speier, Hermine (1950). "Die neuen Ausgrabungen unter der Peterskirche in Rom". In Herbig, Reinhard (ed.). Vermächtnis der antiken Kunst: Gastvorträge zur Jahrhundertfeier der Archäologischen Sammlungen der Universität Heidelberg (in German). Heidelberg, Germany: Kerle. OCLC 260101773.
- Speier, H (1952). "Memoria Sancti Petri, die Auffindung des Petrusgrabes". Wort und Wahrheit (in German). 7 (1). Vienna, Austria: 262–272.
- Speier, Hermine (1954). Die Iliupersisschale aus der Werkstatt des Euphronios (in German). Stuttgart, Germany: W. Kohlhammer. OCLC 878483537.
- Speier, Hermine (1955). Fragment eines tarentinischen Tonreliefs in römischem Privatbesitz (in German). Stuttgart, Germany: W. Kohlhammer. OCLC 43656407.
- Speier, Hermine (1963). Führer durch die öffentlichen Sammlungen klassischer Altertümer in Rom/ 1, Die päpstlichen Sammlungen im Vatikan und Lateran. Wolfgang Helbig Guides (in German). Vol. 1. Tübingen, Germany: Wasmuth. OCLC 310505646.
- Speier, Hermine (1966). Führer durch die öffentlichen Sammlungen klassischer Altertümer in Rom/ 2, Die städtischen Sammlungen - Kapitolinische Museen und Museo Barracco, die staatlichen Sammlungen - Ara pacis, Galleria Borghese, Galleria Spada, Museo Pigorini, Antiquarien auf Forum und Palatin. Wolfgang Helbig Guides (in German). Vol. 2. Tübingen, Germany: Wasmuth. OCLC 310505668.
- Speier, Hermine (1969). Führer durch die öffentlichen Sammlungen klassischer Altertümer in Rom/ 3, Die staatlichen Sammlungen : Museo Nazionale Romano (Thermenmuseum), Museo Nazionale di Villa Giulia. Wolfgang Helbig Guides (in German). Vol. 3. Tübingen, Germany: Wasmuth. OCLC 310505679.
- Speier, Hermine (1972). Führer durch die öffentlichen Sammlungen klassischer Altertümer in Rom/ 4, Die staatlichen Sammlungen : Museo Ostiense in Ostia Antica, Museo der Villa Hadriana in Tivoli; Villa Albani. Wolfgang Helbig Guides (in German). Vol. 4. Tübingen, Germany: Wasmuth. ISBN 9783803010063. OCLC 310505696.

== Bibliography ==
- Bittel, Kurt; Deutsches Archäologisches Institut (1979). Beiträge zur Geschichte des Deutschen Archäologischen Instituts 1929 bis 1979. von Zabern. ISBN 978-3-8053-0396-5.
- De Marco, Angelus A. (1964). The Tomb of Saint Peter: A Representative and Annotated Bibliography of the Excavations. Leiden, The Netherlands: Brill Archive. GGKEY:EHF48W247B5.
- Ermolaev, Alekseĭ Mikhaĭlovich; Dibner, Vitaliĭ Davydovich (2009). Arctic Scientist, Gulag Survivor: The Biography of Mikhail Mikhailovich Ermolaev, 1905-1991. Calgary, Canada: University of Calgary Press. ISBN 978-1-55238-256-1.
- Fattorini, Emma (2011). Hitler, Mussolini and the Vatican: Pope Pius XI and the Speech That was Never Made. Cambridge, England: Polity. ISBN 978-0-7456-4488-2.
- Fries, Jana Esther; Gutsmiedl-Schümann, Doris (2013). Ausgräberinnen, Forscherinnen, Pionierinnen: Ausgewählte Porträts früher Archäologinnen im Kontext ihrer Zeit. Münster, Germany: Waxmann Verlag. ISBN 978-3-8309-7872-5.
- The Metropolitan Museum of Art, New York (1982). Schultz, Ellen; Horbar, Amy (eds.). The Vatican collection the Papacy and art; [Ausstellung] Metropolitan Museum of Art, New York vom 26.2.1983 - 12.6.1983; [Bestand] Vatikan, Rom. New York City, New York: Abrams. ISBN 0-8109-1710-6.
- Palagia, Olga (1998). The Pediments of the Parthenon. Leiden, The Netherlands: Brill. ISBN 90-04-11198-0.
- Rozett, Dr Robert; Spector, Dr Shmuel (2013). Encyclopedia of the Holocaust. London and New York: Routledge. ISBN 978-1-135-96950-9.
- Sailer, Gudrun (2015). Monsignorina. Die deutsche Jüdin Hermine Speier im Vatikan. Münster, Germany: Aschendorff. ISBN 978-3-402-13079-7.
- Zanker, Paul (2014). "Hermine Speier (1898-1989)-eine Archäologin in Vatikan". In Heid, Stefan; Matheus, Michael (eds.). Orte der Zuflucht und personeller Netzwerke: Der Campo Santo Teutonico und der Vatikan 1933-1955. Freiburg, Germany: Verlag Herder. ISBN 978-3-451-80140-2.
