= Mickaël Vendetta =

French actor

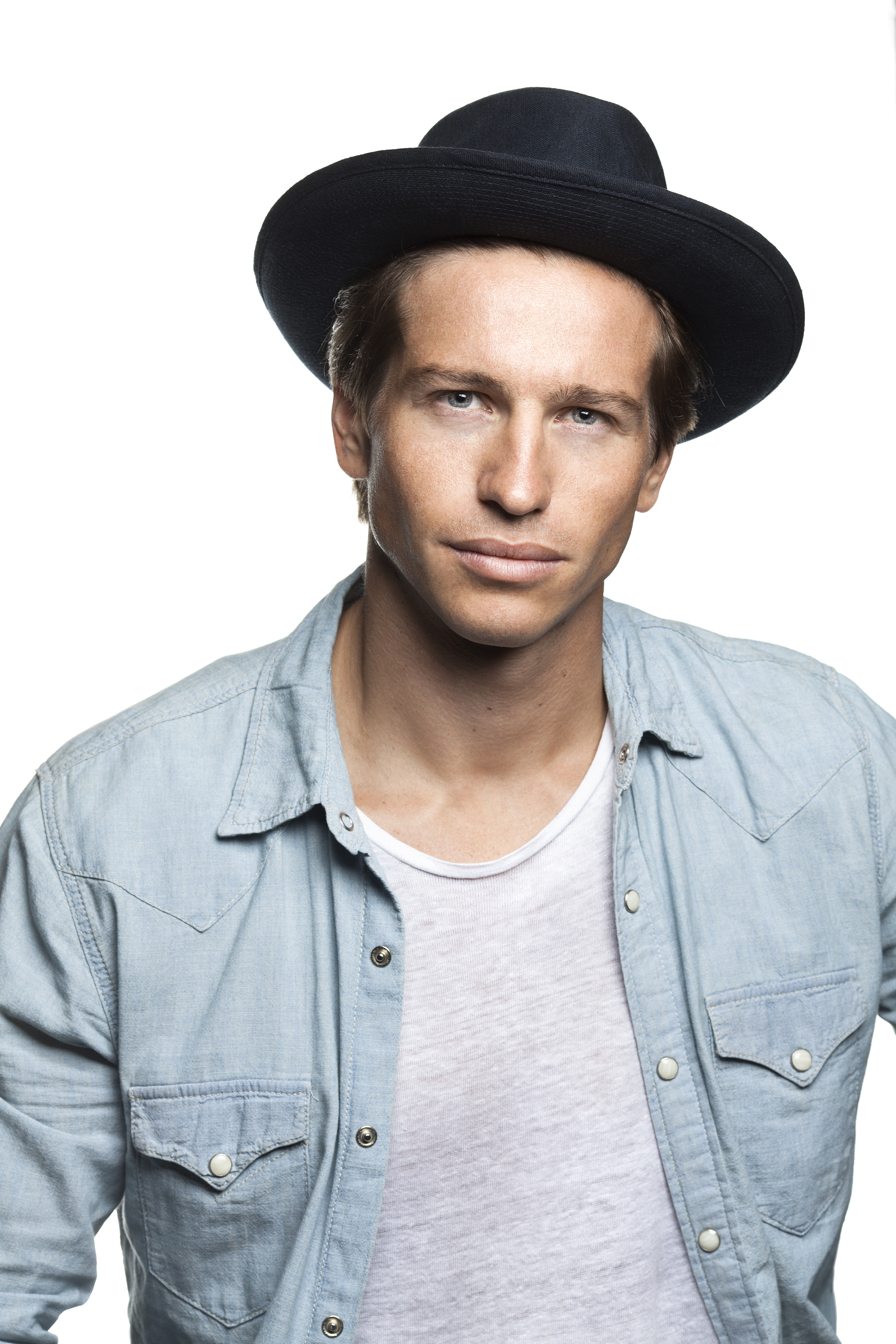

Mickaël Adon (French pronunciation: [mikaɛl adɔ̃]; born October 3, 1987, in Paris), better known as Mickaël Vendetta, is a French Internet phenomenon and entrepreneur whose notoriety followed upon the buzz he created on the internet through his personal blog.

== Background ==
He lists as his personal objectives, to become an actor, to market a clothing line, and release a single of house music. He also considers becoming a politician like Arnold Schwarzenegger, and, along with Bernard Tapie, supports Nicolas Sarkozy.

== Career ==
Vendetta worked briefly in real estate before leaving that business to develop his philosophy of "Bogossitude" ("good looking guy-ness") and promoting it on his blog and in media. He created a buzz by publishing partly naked videos of him on his personal blog, showing his physique and establishing having a strong personality, by being purposefully arrogant and pretentious in order to gain public response.

He appeared on the site Trendywebtv.com, a site which had previously produced Cindy Sander.

Vendetta appeared on various TV and radio shows and acted for several TV commercial spots for Pringles chips, produced a house music single, and won La Ferme Célébrités (Celebrity Farm) (2010). He has produced a house music single named "The bogoss Life" on XIII Bis Records, as well as making appearances in business schools and night clubs.

=== Television and radio ===
Among the shows in which Vendetta has appeared are La méthode Cauet (The Cauet Method) on TF1, Chez Morandini on Direct8, LCI, as well as on Swiss TV and on Virgin Radio. His appearance on La méthode Cauet made the audience of the show become quite heated in response.

== Critique ==
While he was part of the cast, and eventual winner, of La Ferme Célébrités 2010, the media had earlier criticized him for being arrogant, conceited and contemptuous. In 2008, David Abiker of France Info compared Vendetta to Paris Hilton, in that he was engaged in a similar race for notoriety. Ecrans called Vendetta "une marchandise dont le contenu n'est rien d'autre que son propre message publicitaire" (a commodity whose content is nothing other than his own publicity).
