= Première Compagnie =

- Season 1
- No. of days: 49
- No. of housemates: 12
- Winner: Nathalie Simon
- Runner-up: Jean Roucas

Season chronology
- ← Previous; The Farm 1 Next → The Farm 2

Première Compagnie is French television reality presented by Laurence Boccolini (weekly) and Bruno Roblès (daily) and broadcast on TF1 from 5 February 2005 to 25 March 2005. The show was produced by Endemol.

== Contestant ==
Celebrity	Occupation	Status
Lætitia Bléger	Miss France 2004	Eliminated 1st on 5 February 2005
Frank Delay	Former member of 2Be3	Eliminated 2nd on 18 February 2005
Marlène Mourreau	TV Personality & glamour model	Eliminated 3rd on 25 February 2005
Douchka	Disney Ambassador & singer	Eliminated 4th on 5 March 2005
Sylvain Mirouf	Magician	Eliminated 5th on 11 March 2005
Jean-Pierre Castaldi	Actor & Benjamin Castaldi's father	Withdrew on 17 March 2005
Thallia	Glamour model	Eliminated 6th on 18 March 2005
Pascal Gentil	Champion of taekwondo	Eliminated 7th on 22 March 2005
Vincent Moscato	Former rugby player	Eliminated 8th on 23 March 2005
Hélène Rollès	Actress & singer	Third Place on 24 March 2005
Jean Roucas	Humorist	Second Place on 25 March 2005
Nathalie Simon	Champion of windsurfing	Winners on 25 March 2005
