= H.D. =

American poet and novelist (1886–1961)

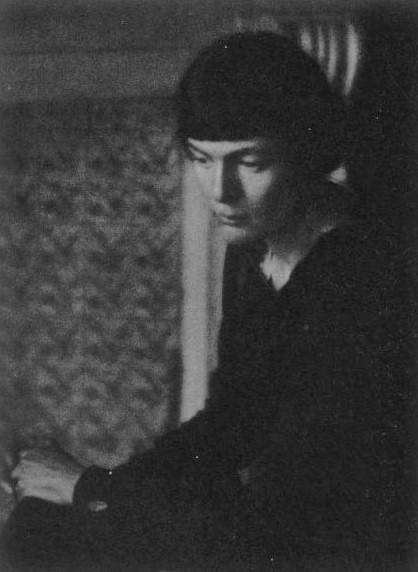
- H.D. c. 1917
- Born: Hilda Doolittle; September 10, 1886; Bethlehem, Pennsylvania, U.S.
- Died: September 27, 1961 (aged 75); Zürich, Switzerland
- Education: Bryn Mawr College
- Occupations: Poet; novelist; memoirist

Hilda Doolittle (September 10, 1886 – September 27, 1961) was an American modernist poet, novelist, and memoirist who wrote under the name H.D. throughout her life. Her career began in 1911 after she moved to London and co-founded the avant-garde Imagist group of poets with American expatriate poet and critic Ezra Pound. During this early period, her minimalist free verse poems depicting Classical motifs drew international attention. Eventually distancing herself from the Imagist movement, she experimented with a wider variety of forms, including fiction, memoir, and verse drama. Reflecting the trauma she experienced in London during the Blitz, H.D.'s poetic style from World War II until her death pivoted towards complex long poems on esoteric and pacifist themes.

H.D. was born in Bethlehem, Pennsylvania, to wealthy and educated parents. Discovering her bisexuality, she had her first same-sex relationship while attending Bryn Mawr College between 1904 and 1906. After years of friendship, H.D. became engaged to Pound and followed him to London in 1911, where he championed her work. Their relationship soon fell apart, however, and H.D. instead married the Imagist poet Richard Aldington in 1913. In 1918, she met the novelist Bryher, who became her romantic partner and close friend until her death. An associate literary editor of the Egoist journal between 1916 and 1917, H.D. was published by The English Review and The Transatlantic Review. During World War I, both her brother and father died, and she separated from Aldington. She was treated by Sigmund Freud during the 1930s, as she sought to address and understand both her war trauma and bisexuality.

H.D. was keenly interested in Ancient Greek literature and published numerous Greek translations. Her poems routinely drew from Greek mythology and classical poets, from her earliest Imagist lyrics which depicted natural landscapes using Hellenistic motifs, to her 1950s long poem Helen in Egypt which reinterpreted the myth of the Trojan War. Raised Moravian by her family, and first introduced to occult and esoteric religious ideas by Pound in her youth, H.D. gradually developed a unique syncretic spiritual worldview. H.D.'s spiritual devotion intensified during and after World War II, and her syncretic ideas became the central focus of her later writing.

While H.D. wrote in a wide range of genres and modes over her career, during her lifetime she was known almost exclusively for her early Imagist poems. Following a reappraisal by feminist critics in the 1970s and 1980s, the significance of her late long poems and prose works was increasingly recognized, and she has come to be understood as a central figure in the history of modernist literature.

== Early life and education ==
Hilda Doolittle was born on September 10, 1886, in the Moravian community of Bethlehem, Pennsylvania. Her father, Charles, was professor of astronomy at Lehigh University in Bethlehem, and her mother, Helen (née Wolle), was a member of the Moravian brotherhood. Hilda had five brothers. When her father was appointed professor of astronomy at the University of Pennsylvania to take charge of the Flower Observatory in Philadelphia, the family moved to Upper Darby.

She attended Friends' Central School in Philadelphia, and graduated in 1905. She delivered a commencement address, titled "The Poet's Influence". She enrolled at Bryn Mawr College in 1905 to study Greek literature, where she met the poets Marianne Moore and William Carlos Williams. After three terms of poor grades, H.D. withdrew from the college, and studied at home until 1910.

H.D. met poet Ezra Pound as a teenager in 1901. Pound became a lifelong friend and played a formative role in her development as a writer. In 1905, Pound and H.D. began an on-and-off relationship which included at least two engagements. Although his parents were in favor of the relationship, her parents strongly objected. In 1907, Pound gave her Hilda's Book, a handmade vellum binding of twenty-five of his earliest love poems, which he dedicated to her.

In 1910, Doolittle began a relationship with Frances Josepha Gregg, a young female art student at the Pennsylvania Academy of the Fine Arts in Philadelphia. Inspired by Gregg, H.D. wrote her first published poems, modeled after the work of Theocritus. Some of her early work, including some children's stories about astronomy, was published in New York newspapers and Presbyterian newsletters.

== Career ==
=== Imagism ===
In May 1911, H.D. traveled to London on a vacation with Gregg and Gregg's mother; Gregg returned home, but H.D. stayed to develop a career as a writer. Pound introduced her to his friends, including English writer Brigit Patmore. Patmore introduced her to Richard Aldington, who became her husband in 1913. The three lived in Church Walk in Kensington; Pound resided at no. 10, Aldington at no. 8, and H.D. at no. 6, and they gathered to work daily in the British Museum Reading Room.

Pound began to meet with other poets in London to discuss ideas for reforming contemporary poetry. Like most modernists in different artistic fields, she sought to "make it new", which they accomplished by incorporating free verse, the brevity of the tanka and haiku forms, and the removal of unnecessary verbiage. Pound, H.D. and Aldington became known as the "three original Imagists" and published a three-point manifesto proclaiming the edicts of Imagism. According to Pound:

We were agreed upon the three principles following:

1. Direct treatment of the 'thing' whether subjective or objective.
2. To use absolutely no word that does not contribute to the presentation.
3. As regarding rhythm: to compose poetry in the sequence of the musical phrase, not in sequence of a metronome.

During a 1912 conversation with Pound, H.D. told him that she found "Hilda Doolittle" to be an old fashioned and "quaint" name; he suggested the signature H.D., an abbreviation she kept for the remainder of her career. After he "scrawled the name H.D. Imagiste" at the bottom of the page of her poem "Hermes of the Ways", she adopted H.D. as a pen. Privately he called her "Dryad".

In October 1912, under the rubric Imagiste, Pound submitted a selection of H.D.'s poems to Harriet Monroe, founder of the magazine Poetry, which was founded that year. In the January 1913 issue, three of her poems were published, "Hermes of the Ways", which Pound described as "this is poetry" after reading, "Priapus: Keeper of Orchards", later renamed "Orchard", and "Epigram". Three poems by Aldington were also published in the issue. These early poems are informed by her reading of Classical Greek literature, especially of Sappho, an interest she shared with Aldington and Pound. Her Imagist poetry is characterized by sparse language and a classical, austere purity, exemplified by one of her earliest and best-known poems, "Oread" (1915):

Whirl up, sea—
whirl your pointed pines,
splash your great pines
on our rocks,
hurl your green over us,
cover us with your pools of fir.

The style was not without its critics. In a dedicated Imagist issue of The Egoist magazine in May 1915, Harold Monro, an English poet, labeled H.D. the "truest Imagist" but dismissed her early work as "petty poetry", denoting "either poverty of imagination or needlessly excessive restraint". In contrast, a 1927 review by the British modernist author and critic May Sinclair described "Oread"'s brevity as a "miracle" and criticized Monro for not recognizing it.

=== World War I and after ===
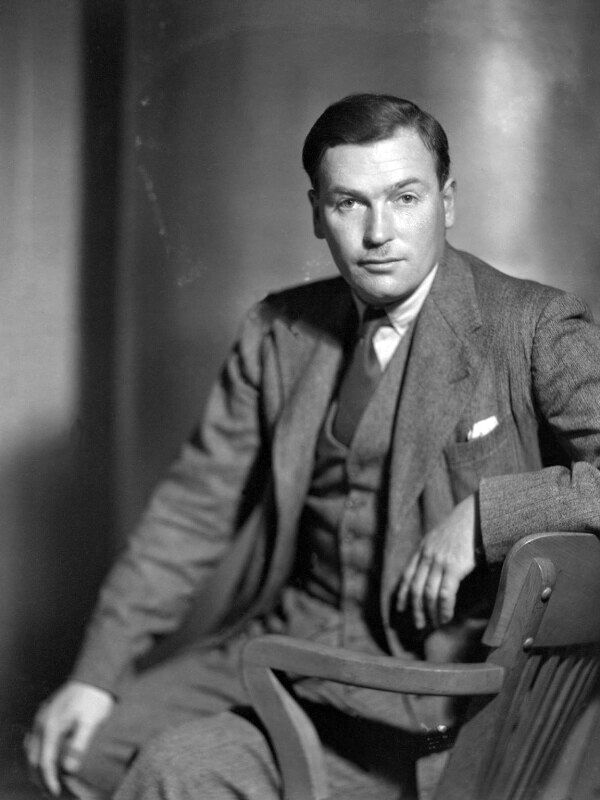
English writer and poet Richard Aldington in 1931; he and H.D. married in 1913 but soon became estranged, divorcing in 1938.

In 1913, H.D. married Richard Aldington. The following year, Pound married the English artist Dorothy Shakespear. H.D. and Aldington's only child, a daughter, was stillborn in 1915. He enlisted in the British Army, and she took his place as assistant editor of The Egoist, serving for the next year. In 1916, H.D.'s first book, Sea Garden, was published. Meanwhile, H.D. and Aldington drifted apart; he reportedly took a mistress in 1917, and she started a close but platonic relationship with the English writer D. H. Lawrence.

In 1918, H.D.'s brother Gilbert was killed in action. She moved to Cornwall that March with the Scottish composer Cecil Gray, a friend of Lawrence. She became pregnant with Gray's child, but by the time she realized she was expecting, the relationship had cooled and Gray had returned to London. H.D. learned that her father died, having never recovered from Gilbert's death. Despondent and sick with the Spanish flu, she came close to death during the birth of their daughter Perdita Aldington in 1919.

H.D. and Aldington tried to salvage their relationship but failed, in part because of his post-war post-traumatic stress disorder, but especially because of her pregnancy with Gray. They became estranged, and later divorced in 1938.

In July 1918, she met the wealthy English novelist Bryher (Annie Winifred Ellerman) in Cornwall, and the two began a relationship. Bryher was several years younger than H.D., a lesbian, and equally non-conformist. Both women were unusually tall, a fact that made H.D. self-conscious. The two lived together on and off until 1950. Both had numerous other partners, but Bryher was H.D.'s lover for the rest of her life. Bryher entered a marriage of convenience with the American writer and publisher Robert McAlmon, allowing him to use some of her wealth to fund his Paris-based Contact Press publishing house. In 1923, H.D. and Bryher traveled to Egypt for the opening of Tutankhamun's tomb, before settling in Switzerland.

She wrote one of her few known statements on poetics, Notes on Thought and Vision, in 1919, although it was not published until 1982. In it, she speaks of poets (including herself) as belonging to a kind of elite group of visionaries with the power to "turn the whole tide of human thought". During this time, she incorporated feminist ideas into her poems.

=== Poetry cycles, novels and psychoanalysis ===
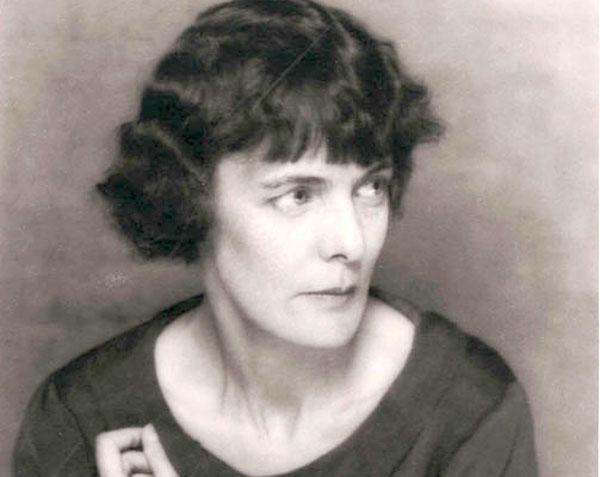
H.D. at approximately age 36 in 1922

Poetry and novella cycles are a feature of H.D.'s early 1920s writing. The first, "Magna Graeca", consists of the poems Palimpsest (1921) and Hedylus (1928), which use classical settings to explore the role of a poet, particularly a female poet's value in a patriarchal literary culture. The following cycles, "HERmione", "Bid Me to Live", "Paint It Today", and "Asphodel" are largely autobiographical and preoccupied with the development of the female artist and the conflict between heterosexual and lesbian desire. The novellas Kora and Ka and The Usual Star from the Borderline cycle were published in 1933, followed by Pilate's Wife, Mira-Mare and Nights.

In 1927, H.D.'s mother died. Bryher divorced McAlmon that year to marry Kenneth Macpherson, then H.D.'s male lover. Bryher, Macpherson and H.D. lived and traveled together through Europe together in what the New York School poet Barbara Guest termed a "menagerie of three". Bryher adopted H.D.'s daughter, Perdita, while still married to Macpherson: leading to the change of name to Perdita Macpherson. Later, Bryher named Perdita as heir to her will. They moved to the shores of Lake Geneva where they lived in a Bauhaus villa. H.D. became pregnant in 1928 and got an abortion.

In 1927, Bryher and Macpherson founded the monthly magazine, Close Up, as a venue for the discussion of cinema. That year the independent film cinema group POOL or Pool Group was established (largely funded with Bryher's inheritance) and was managed by all three. In the 1930 POOL film Borderline, the actors were H.D. and Bryher and the couple Paul and Eslanda Robeson, the latter appearing as wife and husband. The film explores extreme psychic states, racism, and interracial relationships. H.D. wrote an explanatory pamphlet to accompany the film.

In 1928, H.D. began psychoanalysis with the Freudian Hanns Sachs. In 1933, she traveled to Vienna in 1933 for analysis with Sigmund Freud. Her interest in Freud's theories began in 1909 after she read his works in its original German. She was referred to Freud by Bryher's psychoanalyst because of her apparent paranoia about the rise of Adolf Hitler. World War I left her feeling shattered; she lost her brother in action, her father died in reaction to the loss of his son, her husband was traumatized by combat, and she believed that the shock at hearing of the sinking the RMS Lusitania indirectly caused the miscarriage of her child. H.D. undertook two series of analysis with Freud from March to May 1933 and from October to November 1934. At Freud's suggestion, H.D. wrote Bid me to Live, which was not published until 1960, and in which she details her traumatic war experiences. Writing on the Wall, an impressionistic memoir of the sessions and a reevaluation of the importance of Freud's psychoanalysis, was written concurrently with Trilogy and published in 1944; in 1956, it was published under the title Tribute to Freud. Advent, based on the journal she kept during her analysis, was added to Tribute to Freud when it was reissued in 1974.

=== World War II ===
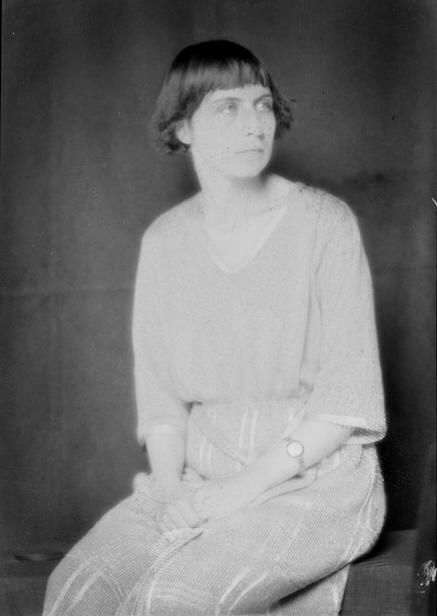
A 1923 photo of Bryher by Man Ray

Hilda and Bryher spent World War II in London. While there, her daughter Perdita became a secretary of the Office of Strategic Services (OSS). Between 1941 and 1943 H.D. wrote The Gift, a short memoir of her childhood in Bethlehem that details the people and events that shaped her. She began the Trilogy series in 1942, comprising three long, unrhyming, and complex volumes of poems: The Walls do not Fall (1944), Tribute to the Angels (1945) and The Flowering of the Rod (1946). H.D. wrote the first while living in London and details her reactions to the Blitz and World War II. The following two books compare the ruins of London to those of ancient Egypt and classical Greece; the former of which she had seen during a 1923 visit. The opening lines of The Walls do not Fall clearly and immediately signal her break with her earlier work:

An incident here and there,
and rails gone (for guns)
from your (and my) old town square.

H.D.'s relationship with Bryher ended just after the war, although they remained in contact. She moved to Switzerland where she had a severe mental breakdown in the spring of 1946 and took refuge in a clinic until the autumn of that year. She lived in Switzerland for the rest of her life. In the late 1950s, she underwent further treatment with the psychoanalyst Erich Heydt, who supported her while she wrote End to Torment, a memoir of her relationship with Pound.

=== Later work ===
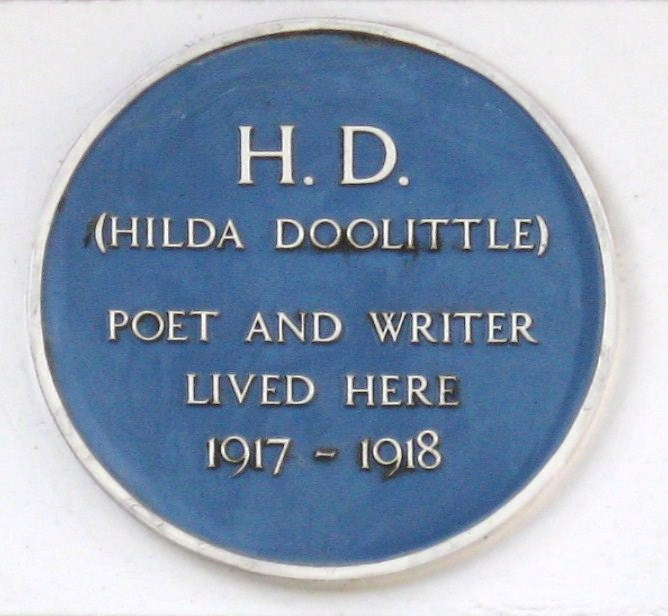
A commemorative plaque at 44 Mecklenburgh Square in London

H.D.'s later work drew heavily from her eclectic blend of Christianity, Ancient Greek and Egyptian religion, Spiritualism, Hermeticism, Martinism and Cabala via the works of Robert Ambelain, alchemy, tarot, astrology, and Freudian psychoanalysis. She used the medium of the long poem to explore and communicate this mix of spiritualities.

Between 1952 and 1955, while in her 60s, H.D. wrote her longest poem, Helen in Egypt. It was not published until just before her death in 1961. It is based on Euripides' trilogy drama Helen, but imagines Helen of Troy's life after the fall of Troy and her relocation to Egypt. The poem reconstructs the source material into a feminist reinterpretation, and has thus been described as "exploring ... [but] ... concluding" the themes as her earlier work. Helen in Egypts long form and wide historical span has been seen as a response to Pound's Cantos, which she admired. In End to Torment she approved of Norman Holmes Pearson's labeling of Helen in Egypt as "her 'cantos'".

A compilation of her late poems were published posthumously in 1972 under the title Hermetic Definition. The book takes as its starting points her love for a man 30 years her junior and the line "so slow is the rose to open" from Pound's Canto 106. "Sagesse", which she wrote in bed having broken her hip in a fall, serves as a coda to Trilogy, being partly written in the voice of a young female Blitz survivor who finds herself living in fear of the atom bomb. "Winter Love" was written during the same period as End to Torment and uses as narrator the Homeric figure of Penelope to restate the material of the memoir in poetic form. At one time, H.D. considered appending this poem as a coda to Helen in Egypt.

She returned to the U.S. in 1960, when she was the first woman to be recognized with the Award of Merit Medal for poetry from the American Academy of Arts and Letters.

== Death ==
H.D was left gravely ill after a stroke in July 1961 and was taken to the Klinik Hirslanden in Zürich, where she died on September 27. She was survived by Bryher and her daughter Perdita.

Her ashes were brought to Bethlehem, Pennsylvania, where they were buried in the family plot in Nisky Hill Cemetery on October 28, 1961. Her headstone is inscribed with lines from her early poem "Epitaph":

So you may say,
Greek flower; Greek ecstasy
reclaims forever
one who died
following intricate song's
lost measure.

== Appraisal ==
During her career, H.D. wrote a large number of works in a variety of styles and formats. They evolved from lyrics written in the 1910s, such as Sea Garden, through her early period Imagist poems and free verse, to her complex long poems Trilogy (written 1942–1944), Helen in Egypt (1952–1955), Vale Ave (1957), and the 1971 collection Hermetic Definition, consisting of the title poem (1961), "Sagesse" (1957), and "Winter Love" (1959). During her lifetime, her later poems, novels, and numerous translations of classical works were rarely studied or taught, and only her early poems, "Oread" and "Heat", appeared in anthologies. For decades, her reputation was as an Imagist who peaked in the 1920s; a consignment the literary critic Susan Friedman believes placed H.D. as "a captive and in prison". In 1972, Hugh Kenner wrote that assigning her as just an Imagist poet was similar to evaluating "five of the shortest pieces in Harmonium [as equal to] the life's work of Wallace Stevens". Although Pound claimed in the 1930s that he formed the Imagist movement "to launch H.D. and Aldington before either had enough stuff for a volume", several key poets within the group, including Amy Lowell, viewed H.D. as the main focal point and innovator in achieving the group's "revolution in taste".

H.D. was aware early on that both the strictures of Imagism and Pound's controlling temperament would constrain her creative voice, and by the mid-1920s her work had developed beyond Imagism. In 1990, the feminist scholar Gertrude Reif Hughes described her as "physically fragile-looking in a traditionally feminine way". H.D. understood the danger of objectification, particularly as the only woman in a group of men in her circle. She worried about being perceived merely as their private muse, which she feared affected her public image and standing as a poet and prominent intellectual in her own right. Female objectification is explored in "HER", where she writes of "a classic dilemma for woman: the necessity to choose between being a muse to another or being an artist oneself". Although Pound was a lifelong champion, a number of other early Imagists, including Aldington and Lawrence, attempted to diminish her importance and consign her to a minor role. Similarly, while her mid-period poems and writings explore mysticism, esotericism and the occult, in a similar manner to poets such as W. B. Yeats (with whom she was personally acquainted), H.D. was rarely read before the 1970s.

Although the critic Linda Wagner wrote in 1969 that one of the "ironies of contemporary literature [is] that H.D. is remembered chiefly for her Imagist work given that few contemporary writers have written so much in their maturity"; her reappraisal only began in the 1970s and 1980s. This coincided with the emergence of feminist interest in her work, followed by queer studies scholars. Specifically, critics such as Friedman (1981), Janice Robertson (1982) and Rachel DuPlessis (1986) began to challenge the standard view of English-language literary modernism as based on only the work of male writers, and gradually restored H.D. to a more significant position in the movement. In 1990, Hughes wrote that H.D.'s mid-century poems, like those of Gwendolyn Brooks, anticipate second-wave feminism, and explore issues raised in Simone de Beauvoir's 1949 book The Second Sex. According to Hughes, H.D.'s work challenges patriarchal privilege and seeks to "revise the mentalities that sponsor them". She notes in particular how in Helen in Egypt, H.D. positions Helen as "the protagonist, instead of the pawn", in such a way as to counter the "conservative and often misogynistic" tendencies which Hughes finds in the modernism of Pound and T. S. Eliot.

H.D.'s writings have served as a model for a number of more recent female poets working in the modernist and post-modernist traditions, including Barbara Guest, the Black Mountain poet Hilda Morley and the Language poet Susan Howe. The Anglo-American poet Denise Levertov wrote of her deep appreciation for H.D., particularly for her long poems on mystical themes, writing that H.D. "showed the way to penetrate mystery, [...] to enter into darkness, mystery, so that it is experienced". Her influence is not limited to female poets; many male writers and poets, including Robert Duncan, have acknowledged their debt. Duncan, whose poetics built on her syncretic spirituality, placed H.D. at the center of his study of modernist poetry, titled The H.D. Book, and frequently lectured on her work. The Dutch poet H.C. ten Berge wrote his 2008 "Het vertrapte mysterie" ("The Trampled Mystery") in memory of H.D.

Passages from Trilogy were widely shared across electronic discussion lists in the days following the September 11th attacks.

During World War II, H.D.'s daughter Perdita was involved in breaking codes at Bletchley Park, and later worked for the Office of Strategic Services, the predecessor of the Central Intelligence Agency. In the OSS, she served with Graham Greene and James Angleton. H.D.'s grandchildren include the author and Beatles biographer Nicholas Schaffner.

== Works ==
Works are listed by date of composition, where known.

=== Poetry ===
- Sea Garden (1912–1916)
- Choruses from the Iphigeneia in Aulis and The Hippollytus of Euripides (1919)
- Hymen (1921)
- Heliodora (1924)
- Collected Poems of H.D. (published 1925, bringing together Sea Garden, Hymen, Heliodora, and two new collections)
  - The God, grouping previously uncollected poems (1913–1917)
    - "Oread"
  - Translations (1915–1920)
- Red Roses for Bronze (1931)
  - "The Mysteries: Renaissance Choros"
- Uncollected and Unpublished Poems 1912–1944, first collected in Collected Poems: 1912–1944 (1983)
  - A Dead Priestess Speaks (1930s approx.)
- Trilogy
  - "The Walls Do Not Fall" (1942)
  - "Tribute to the Angels" (1944)
  - "The Flowering of the Rod" (1944)
- Helen in Egypt (1952–1955)
- Vale Ave (1957)
- Hermetic Definition (published 1971)
  - "Hermetic Definition" (1960–1961)
  - "Sagesse" (1957)
  - "Winter Love" (1959)
- Collected Poems: 1912–1944 (published 1983)

=== Plays ===
Both texts are loose verse translations of Greek dramas by Euripides.

- Hippolytus Temporizes: A Play in Three Acts (1927)
- Ion (1937)

=== Prose ===
H.D.'s fictional and nonfictional prose writings are difficult to distinguish with much certainty. Her novels and short stories are often romans-a-clef, and her memoirs and essays are often experimental.

==== Fiction ====
- Paint it Today (1921)
- Asphodel (1921–1922)
- Palimpsest (1926)
- HERmione (1927)
- Bid Me to Live (1927, revised 1947)
- Kora and Ka (1930)
- Nights (1931)
- Usual Star (1934)
- The Hedgehog (1936)
- Majic Ring (1943–1944)
- Pilate's Wife (1929–1934)
- Within the Walls (1941)
  - Collection of short stories or vignettes.
- The Gift (1941–1943)
- The Sword Went Out to Sea (1946–1947)
- White Rose and the Red (1948)
- By Avon River (1949)
  - Hybrid of historical fiction, literary criticism, and poetry.
- The Mystery (1949–1951)
- Magic Mirror (1955–1956)

==== Nonfiction ====
- Notes on Thought and Vision (1919)
- Borderline: A POOL Film with Paul Robeson (1930)
- Tribute to Freud
  - "Advent" (1933)
  - "Writing on the Wall" (1944)
- Compassionate Friendship (1955)
- Hirslanden Notebooks (1957–1959)
- End to Torment: A Memoir of Ezra Pound (1958)
- Thorn Thicket (1960)

== Sources ==
- Aldington, Richard (1992). Gates, Norman T. (ed.). Richard Aldington: An Autobiography in Letters. Pennsylvania State University Press. ISBN 978-0-271-00832-5.
- Anderson, Elizabeth (2013). H.D. and the Modernist Religious Imagination: Mysticism and Writing. London: Bloomsbury.
- Bancroft, Christian (2021). "Doolittle, Hilda ('H.D.'; 1886–1961)". In De Roche, Linda (ed.). Twentieth-Century and Contemporary American Literature in Context. Santa Barbara, California: Greenwood Press. ISBN 978-1-4408-5358-6.
- Barnstone, Aliki. "Reader's Notes". In H.D. (1998).
- Bryer, Jackson R.; Roblyer, Pamela (Autumn 1969). "H. D.: A Preliminary Checklist". Contemporary Literature. 10 (4, Special Number on H.D.: A Reconsideration): 632–675. doi:10.2307/1207704. JSTOR 1207704.
- Carr, Helen (2009). The Verse Revolutionaries: Ezra Pound, H.D. and The Imagists. London: Jonathan Cape. ISBN 978-0-224-04030-3.
- Caserio, Robert L. (June 2004). "Material Modernism: The Politics of the Page and Becoming Marianne Moore: The Early Poems, 1907-1924 (review)". American Literature. 76 (2): 400–402. doi:10.1215/00029831-76-2-400. ISSN 1527-2117. S2CID 152423723.
- Chisholm, Dianne (Spring 1990). "H. D.'s Autoheterography". Tulsa Studies in Women's Literature. 9 (1): 79–106. doi:10.2307/464182. JSTOR 464182.
- Connor, Rachel Ann (2004). H.D. and the Image. Manchester University Press. ISBN 0-7190-6122-9.
- Davies, Megan Lloyd (1997). "H.D. imagiste? Bisexuality: Identity: Imagism". In Bertram, Vicki (ed.). Kicking Daffodils: Twentieth-Century Women Poets. Edinburgh University Press. ISBN 0-7486-0782-X.
- Downs, M. Catherine (2000). "H.D. (Hilda Doolittle) (1886–1961)". In Champion, Laurie (ed.). American Women Writers, 1900–1945: A Bio-Bibliographical Critical Sourcebook. Westport, Connecticut: Greenwood Press. ISBN 978-0-3133-0943-4.
- DuPlessis, Rachel Blau (1986). H.D., The Career of that Struggle. Bloomington and Indianapolis: Indiana University Press. ISBN 978-0-2533-2702-4.
- DuPlessis, Rachel Blau; Friedman, Susan Stanford (Autumn 1981). "'Woman Is Perfect': H.D.'s Debate with Freud". Feminist Studies. 7 (3): 417–430. doi:10.2307/3177758. hdl:2027/spo.0499697.0007.305. JSTOR 3177758. PMID 11620149.
- Engel, Bernard F. (Autumn 1969). "H. D.: Poems That Matter and Dilutations". Contemporary Literature. 10 (4, Special Number on H.D.: A Reconsideration): 507–522. doi:10.2307/1207693. JSTOR 1207693.
- Firchow, Peter E. (1980). "Rico and Julia: The Hilda Doolittle: D. H. Lawrence Affair Reconsidered". Journal of Modern Literature. 8 (1): 51–76. ISSN 0022-281X. JSTOR 3831310.
- Friedman, Susan (March 1975). "Who Buried H. D.? A Poet, Her Critics, and Her Place in "The Literary Tradition"". College English. 36 (7): 801–814. doi:10.2307/375177. JSTOR 375177.
- ——— (1981). Psyche Reborn: The Emergence of H.D. Bloomington, Indiana: Indiana University Press. ISBN 0-253-37826-5.
- ——— , ed. (2002). Analyzing Freud: Letters of H.D., Bryher, and Their Circle. New York: New Directions. ISBN 978-0-8112-1499-5.
- Friedman, Susan Stanford; DuPlessis, Rachel Blau, eds. (1990a). Signets: Reading H.D. Madison, Wisconsin: University of Wisconsin Press. ISBN 978-0-2991-2680-3.
- Friedman, Susan Stanford; DuPlessis, Rachel Blau (1990b). "'I Had Two Loves Separate': The Sexualities of H.D.'s Her". In Friedman & DuPlessis (1990a).
- Friedman, Susan Stanford (1990). Penelope's Web: Gender, Modernity, H.D.'s Fiction. Cambridge University Press. ISBN 978-0-5212-5579-0.
- Gates, Norman T. "Introduction to Chapter 1". In Aldington (1992).
- Gill, Jo (2005). "H.D. (Hilda Doolittle) (1886–1961)". In Marshall, Bill; Johnston, Cristina (eds.). France and the Americas: Culture, Politics, and History. Santa Barbara, California: ABC-CLIO. ISBN 978-1-8510-9411-0.
- Glaser, Brian Brodhead (2005). "H.D.'s 'Helen in Egypt': Aging and the Unconscious". Journal of Modern Literature. 28 (4): 91–109. ISSN 0022-281X. JSTOR 25167543.
- Guest, Barbara (1984). Herself Defined: The Poet H.D. and Her World. Garden City, New York: Doubleday. ISBN 978-0-3851-3129-2.
- H.D. (1983). Martz, Louis L. (ed.). Collected Poems, 1912–1944. New York: New Directions. ISBN 978-0-8112-0876-5.
- ——— (1998). Trilogy. New York: New Directions. ISBN 978-0-8112-2266-2.
- Hatlen, Burton (1995). "The Imagist Poetics of H.D.'s Sea Garden". Paideuma: Modern and Contemporary Poetry and Poetics. 24 (2/3): 107–130. ISSN 0090-5674. JSTOR 24726520.
- ——— . "The Long Poem". In Parini & Leininger (2004), Vol. 2.
- Hokanson, Robert O'Brien (December 1992). "Penelope's Web: Gender, Modernity, H.D.'s Fiction by Susan Stanford Friedman". American Literature. 64 (4): 839–840. doi:10.2307/2927666. JSTOR 2927666.
- Hollenberg, Donna Krolik (2022). Winged Words: The Life and Work of the Poet H.D. Ann Arbor: University of Michigan Press. ISBN 978-0-472-22006-9.
- Hughes, Gertrude Reif (September 1990). "Making It Really New: Hilda Doolittle, Gwendolyn Brooks, and the Feminist Potential of Modern Poetry". American Quarterly. 42 (3): 375–401. doi:10.2307/2712940. JSTOR 2712940.
- Kammer, Jeanne (1979). "The Art of Silence and the Forms of Women's Poetry"". In Gilbert, Sandra M.; Gubar, Susan (eds.). Shakespeare's Sisters: Feminist Essays on Women Poets. Bloomington, Indiana: Indiana University Press. ISBN 978-0-2532-0263-5.
- Keeling, Bret L. (Summer 1998). "H. D. and 'The Contest': Archaeology of a Sapphic Gaze". Twentieth Century Literature. 44 (2): 176–203. doi:10.2307/441870. ISSN 0041-462X. JSTOR 441870.fkeel
- Keenaghan, Eric (Summer 2005). "Vulnerable Households: Cold War Containment and Robert Duncan's Queered Nation". Journal of Modern Literature. 28 (4): 57–90. doi:10.1353/jml.2005.0054. ISSN 0022-281X. JSTOR 25167542. S2CID 153457298.
- Kelvin, Norman (Spring 2000). "H.D. and the Years of World War I". Victorian Poetry. 38 (1): 170–196. ISSN 0042-5206. JSTOR 40004298.
- King, Michael (Fall 1981). "Go, Little Book: Ezra Pound, Hilda Doolittle, and 'Hilda's Book'". Paideuma: Modern and Contemporary Poetry and Poetics. 10 (2): 347–360. ISSN 0090-5674. JSTOR 24725256.
- Korg, Jacob (2003). Winter Love: Ezra Pound and H.D. Madison, Wisconsin: University of Wisconsin Press. ISBN 978-0-299-18390-5.
- Lewis, Jone Johnson (June 5, 2021). "Biography of Hilda Doolittle, Poet, Translator, and Memoirist". ThoughtCo.
- Lohser, Beate; Newton, Peter M. (1996). Unorthodox Freud: The View from the Couch. New York: Guilford Press. ISBN 978-1-5723-0128-3.
- Mandel, Charlotte (January 1980). "Garbo/Helen: The Self-Projection of Beauty by H. D.". Women's Studies. 7 (1/2): 127–136. doi:10.1080/00497878.1980.9978507.
- McCabe, Susan (2005). Cinematic Modernism: Modernist Poetry and Film. Cambridge University Press. ISBN 978-0-5218-4621-9.
- ——— (2021). H.D. and Bryher: An Untold Love Story of Modernism. Oxford University Press. ISBN 978-0-1906-2122-3.
- Moody, Anthony David (2009). Ezra Pound: Poet. A Portrait of the Man and his Work. Vol. 1: The Young Genius 1885–1920. Oxford University Press. ISBN 978-0-19-957146-8.
- Morris, Adalaide (Winter 1986). "A Relay of Power and of Peace: H. D. and the Spirit of the Gift". Contemporary Literature. 27 (4): 493–524. doi:10.2307/1208493. ISSN 0010-7484. JSTOR 1208493.
- Parker, Sarah (2014). The Lesbian Muse and Poetic Identity, 1889–1930. London: Pickering & Chatto. ISBN 978-1-84893-386-6.
- Parini, Jay; Leininger, Phillip W., eds. (2004). The Oxford Encyclopedia of American Literature. Oxford University Press. ISBN 978-0-19-515653-9.
- Pearson, Norman Holmes; Dembo, L. S. (Autumn 1969). "Norman Holmes Pearson on H. D.: An Interview". Contemporary Literature. 10 (4, Special Number on H.D.: A Reconsideration): 435–446. doi:10.2307/1207690. JSTOR 1207690.
- Pondrom, Cyrena N. (1990). "H.D. and the Origins of Imagism". In Friedman & DuPlessis (1990a).
- Pound, Ezra (1954). Eliot, T. S. (ed.). Literary Essays of Ezra Pound. New York: New Directions.
- Richardson, Mark. "H.D. (Hilda Doolittle)". In Parini & Leininger (2004), Vol. 2.
- Robinson, Matte (2016). The Astral H.D.: Occult and Religious Sources and Contexts for H.D.'s Poetry and Prose. London: Bloomsbury. ISBN 978-1-6289-2419-0.
- Schaffner, Val (2002). "Perdita Macpherson Schaffner (1919-2001)". www.imagists.org. Archived from the original on February 24, 2021.
- Scott, Bonnie Kime (1995). "H. D.". In Cathy N., Davidson; et al. (eds.). The Oxford Companion to Women's Writing in the United States. Oxford University Press. ISBN 978-0-19-989105-4 – via Oxford Reference.
- Silverstein, Louis H. (1990). "Herself Delineated: Chronological Highlights of H.D.". In Friedman & DuPlessis (1990a).
- Sinclair, May (March 1927). "The Poems of 'H.D.'". The Fortnightly Review. Archived from the original on July 22, 2022.
- Twitchell-Waas, Jeffrey (Winter 1998). "Seaward: H. D.'s Helen in Egypt as a Response to Pound's Cantos". Twentieth Century Literature. 44 (4): 464–483. doi:10.2307/441594. ISSN 0041-462X. JSTOR 441594.
- Wagner, Linda Welshimer (Autumn 1969). "'Helen in Egypt': A Culmination". Contemporary Literature. 10 (4, Special Number on H.D.: A Reconsideration): 523–536. doi:10.2307/1207694. ISSN 0010-7484. JSTOR 1207694.
- Walton, Jean (Winter 1997). "'Nightmare of the Uncoordinated White-Folk': Race, Psychoanalysis, and Borderline". Discourse. 19 (2): 88–109. ISSN 1522-5321. JSTOR 41389446.
- Ward, A. C. (1970). Longman Companion to Twentieth Century Literature. Prentice Hall Press. ISBN 978-0-582-32803-7.
- Wilhelm, James J. (1990). Ezra Pound in London and Paris, 1908–1925. University Park: Pennsylvania State University Press. ISBN 0-271-00682-X.
- Willis, Elizabeth (Spring 2007). "A Public History of the Dividing Line: H. D., the Bomb, and the Roots of the Postmodern". Arizona Quarterly: A Journal of American Literature, Culture, and Theory. 63 (1): 81–108. doi:10.1353/arq.2007.0005. S2CID 162848498.
