= Hermine Riss =

Hermine Riss (1903 in Vienna – 1980) was an Austrian Righteous among the Nations.

From 1942 until 1945, Riss hid in her apartment Regina Heinrich, who was threatened with deportation as a Jew under Nazi Germany's Nuremberg Laws.

She also hid two other Jews, Stefanie Zach (née Rosenstadt) and Otto Breichenstein, at various places, including her own home, to escape deportation. By doing so, Hermine Riss risked her own life.

On 15 May 2005, Yad Vashem recognized Hermine Riss as Righteous Among the Nations.
