= HMS Hermione =

Four ships of the Royal Navy have been named HMS Hermione after Hermione, the daughter of Menelaus and Helen in Greek mythology.

- HMS Hermione (1782) was a 32-gun fifth rate launched in 1782. Her crew mutinied in 1797 and handed her to the Spanish in La Guaira. She was recaptured in Puerto Cabello (1799), renamed HMS Retaliation, and renamed again to HMS Retribution in 1800. She was broken up in 1805.
- HMS Hermione (1893) was an Astraea-class protected cruiser launched in 1893. She served in the First World War and was sold in 1921.
- HMS Hermione (74) was a Dido-class light cruiser, launched in 1939. She was sunk in the Mediterranean by the German submarine U-205 in 1942.
- HMS Hermione (F58) was a Leander-class frigate launched in 1967 and scrapped in 1997.

Also

- HMAS Hermione (774) was an Australian auxiliary patrol vessel, purchased in 1943 and sold in 1945.
