= HERmione =

Book by H.D. (written 1927)

- Author: H.D.
- Language: English
- Genre: Novel, Autobiography
- Publisher: New Directions Publishing Corporation
- Publication date: 1 November 1981
- Publication place: United Kingdom
- Media type: Print Paperback
- Pages: 256
- ISBN: 0-8112-0817-6
- OCLC: 7553331
- Dewey Decimal: 813/.52 19
- LC Class: PS3507.O726 H47 1981

HERmione is an autobiographical novel written by the poet H.D. It forms part of what she refers to as her Madrigal cycle, which also includes Bid Me to Live, Paint it Today and Asphodel.

Although written in 1927, it was not published until 1981; this may be due to a lack of confidence in her writing quality, as H.D. suggested was true of Asphodel, or due to the centrality of her homosexual relationship with Frances Josepha Gregg represented in the novel. While there is no evidence that H.D. attempted to publish the novel, it, along with another autobiographical work The Gift were being prepared for publication at the time of her death in 1961. Her literary executor, Norman Holmes Pearson, had created a typescript of HER which had been heavily revised by H.D.

In the novel, she represents herself as Hermione Gart, a woman in her twenties, shortly after failing at Bryn Mawr. It includes portraits of poet Ezra Pound (as George Lowndes) and Gregg (as Fayne Rabb), with both of whom she had relationships.

== Sources ==
- Friedman, Susan Stanford; DuPlessis, Rachel Blau. 'The Sexualities of H.D.'s Her'. Signets:Reading H.D.. Madison: University of Wisconsin Press, 1990. ISBN 0-299-12680-3
- Moody, A. David. Ezra Pound: Poet. A Portrait of the Man and His Work. I: The Young Genius 1885–1920. Oxford: Oxford University Press, 2007. ISBN 978-0-19-957146-8
