= Hermione (opera) =

Opera by Max Bruch

Hermione is an opera in 4 acts, Op. 40, by Max Bruch to a libretto by Emil Hopffer, based on Shakespeare's The Winter's Tale. The opera premiered March 21, 1872, in Berlin.

== Recordings ==
- Aria of Leontes (No. 7): "Setzt Ihnen nach!", Aria of Leontes (No. 19): "Allein, allein mit meinem Gram" by Franz Hawlata bass, Capriccio 1996
