= Oread =

Type of nymph in Greek mythology

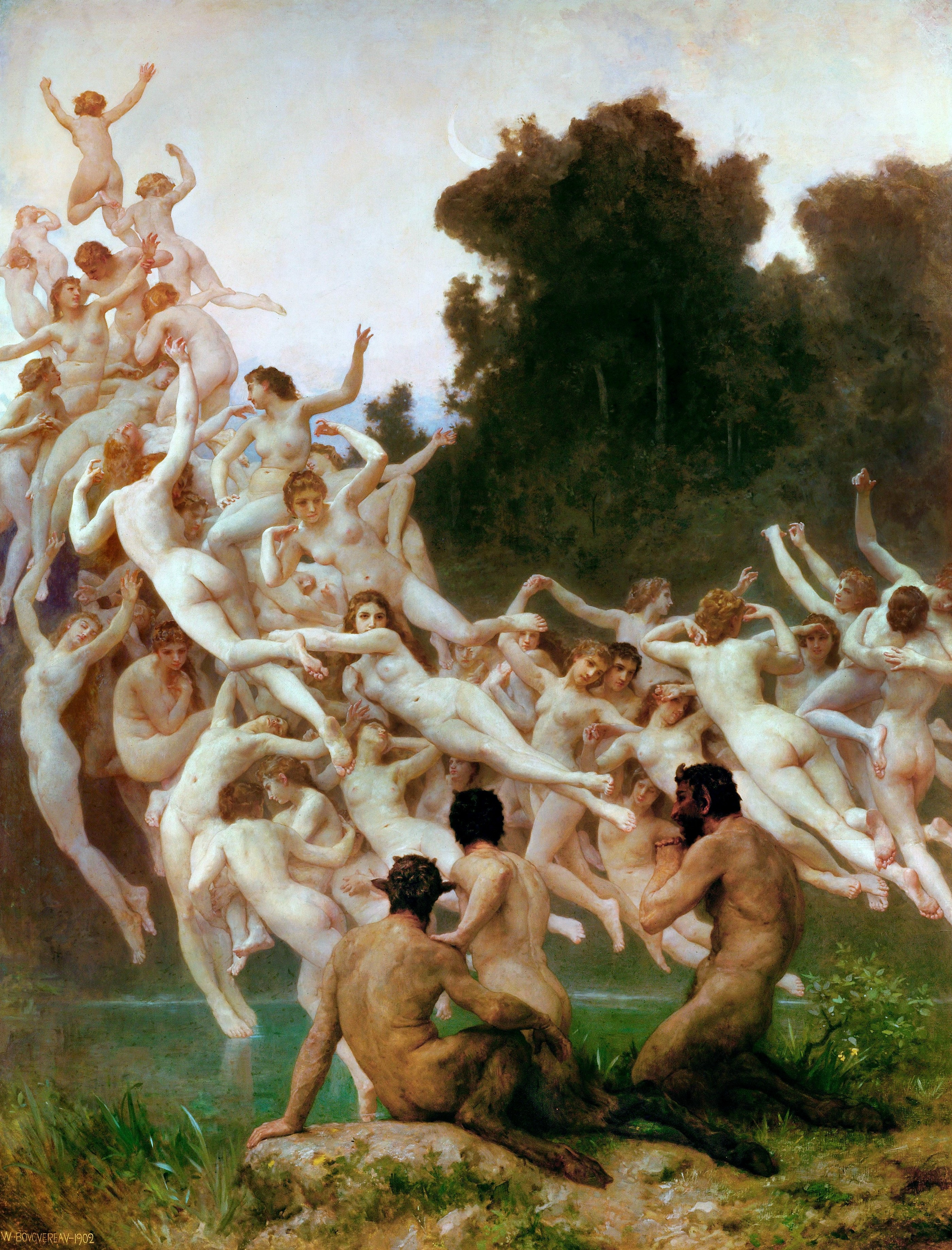
Les Oréades (1902) by William-Adolphe Bouguereau, in Musée d'Orsay

In Greek mythology, Oreads (/ˈɔːriˌæd, ˈɔːriəd/; Ancient Greek: Ὀρειάς, romanized: Oreiás) or Orestiads (/ɔːˈrɛstiˌæd, -iəd/; Ὀρεστιάδες, Orestiádes) are mountain nymphs. They are described as being companions of Artemis, or as being found alongside gods such as Pan or Dionysus.

A 2nd-century AD epigram relates that, with the help of the daughters of Nilus, they erected a place of worship in honour of the woman Isidora, who died by drowning.
