= La Ferme Célébrités =

- Genre: Reality
- Presented by: Benjamin Castaldi; Jean-Pierre Foucault; Christophe Dechavanne; Patrice Carmouze
- Voices of: Jean-Claude Donda (Pipol)
- Theme music composer: Magic System (season 3)
- Country of origin: France
- Original language: French
- No. of seasons: 3
- No. of episodes: 230(70 for season 1 & 3, 60 for season 2)

Production
- Production locations: South Africa, Visan, Paris
- Running time: 50 minutes & 145 minutes
- Production company: Endemol France

Original release
- Network: TF1
- Release: 10 April 2004 – 9 April 2010

Related
- Première Compagnie; Je suis une célébrité, sortez-moi de là !

La Ferme Célébrités is the French version of the international TV show The Farm, produced in France by Endemol and broadcast on TF1. A certain number of B-List celebrities (about 14) appear on it. The show was running in 2004 and 2005, then in 2010. It was hosted by Christophe Dechavanne and Patrice Carmouze in 2004 and 2005 . The farm was located in Visan, Vaucluse in the first seasons. For the season 3, the farm is located in South Africa, Benjamin Castaldi (who hosted the French Pop Idol and the French Big Brother, Secret Story) and Jean-Pierre Foucault (Miss France and Who wants to be a millionaire?) are the new hosts.

== See also ==
- The Farm
