= Robert Herring (poet) =

British writer (1903–1975)

Robert Herring (Robert Herring Williams, b. 13 May 1903, Wandsworth – December 1975, Chelsea) was a novelist, essayist and poet, remembered as an early writer on film, being film critic of The Guardian for most of the 1930s, a regular contributor to the modernist film magazine Close Up, and later editor of the literary magazine, Life and Letters To-day from 1935 to 1950.

== Biography ==
His father, Arthur Herring Williams (1854-1906), made a substantial fortune in business in South Africa but died in England while Herring was still a child. Herring's elder brother, Ernest Arthur Williams (1896-1978) remained in Kokstad, South Africa to manage the family interests but Robert and his mother stayed in Britain. Herring was a cousin of the British writer, translator and polymath Edward Heron-Allen. He was educated at Clifton College, Bristol where he was a protege of R.P. Keigwin. Herring would remain friendly with his former tutor for the rest of Keigwin's life. He then took a second class degree in the English Tripos at Kings College, Cambridge, where his tutor was the specialist in Jacobean revenge tragedy, F.L. Lucas. He graduated in 1924. At Cambridge he was associated with the group around Ivor Montagu and Angus McPhail, publishing his poetry regularly in Montagu's magazine, The Cambridge Mercury. He associated with the "Bright Young Things" in mid 1920s London, being friends with Inez Holden, and invited to Elizabeth Ponsonby's notorious "Bath and Bottle Party" of 13 July 1928. For most of the late 1920s and 1930s Herring lived in a large new apartment at 1 Irvine Court, Porchester Terrace, to the north of Hyde Park, sharing it with his mother, a maid and a chauffeur. The building was destroyed in 1940 by a direct hit during the Blitz. When the lease expired in September 1937 Herring's mother, Clara Helena Williams, née Spillman (1869-1940), with maid and chauffeur, moved to a new home in Eastbourne, where she lived until her death in 1940. In June 1937 Herring moved to 52, Upper Cheyne Row, in Chelsea, sharing it until early 1938 with a friend, Johnny Cole, a 22 year old former soldier in the Grenadier Guards.

== Writing career ==
He began his writing career with a whimsical, fictional travelogue set in Andorra, The President’s Hat (1926) whilst also undertaking editorial work and introductions for a series of new editions of English comedies of manners for the highly reputable publisher Macmillan, starting with The School for Scandal in 1927. His talent was attractive enough for him to be contracted to the literary agency Curtis Brown, and his second book, the satire Adam and Eve at Kew, or, the Revolt in the Gardens, written in late 1926, would eventually appear in early 1930 with illustrations by the fashionable young artist Edward Bawden.

Early in his career, Herring worked for the publisher Allen & Unwin. He was assistant editor of The London Mercury from 1925 to 1928 and a regular contributor, particularly of film criticism, until the journal was sold to new owners in 1934 and J.C. Squire ceased to be editor. At the same time he contributed film criticism regularly to the magazine Drawing and Design: The Magazine of Taste, up to 1929. He became film critic at The Manchester Guardian in mid 1928, being one of the newspaper's best paid freelance contributors for several years. From 1932 onwards he reviewed ballet for the newspaper. He also became London Correspondent for the film magazine Close Up, contributing 38 feature articles between late 1927 and 1933, making him the journal's third most prolific contributor behind the editor Kenneth Macpherson and Oswell Blakeston. He was a regular contributor of talks about the cinema for the BBC and was published several times in The Listener, including two specially commissioned pieces, which were rare in a journal whose content had to be almost wholly the transcripts of earlier broadcasts. On several occasions the BBC considered hiring Herring as its contracted film correspondent. In 1938 he became film critic of the Glasgow Herald. Herring also delivered what was almost certainly the first official lecture on cinema at Cambridge University, on 13 August 1934.

He took over editorship of Life and Letters in 1935, when it was purchased by Bryher's Brendin Publishing Company for £1200. He held the post for about 15 years, working initially with Dorothea Petrie Townsend, an old school friend of Bryher's who was a highly experienced editor with commercial magazines. The magazine's title was modified to Life and Letters To-day, the content of the magazine changed radically, with a large film section being included, directly under Herring's control, and the circulation expanded. The first issue featured articles by Mary Butts, Murray Constantine, H. D., Havelock Ellis, Kenneth Macpherson, Lotte Reiniger, and Gertrude Stein, besides contributions by Sergei M. Eisenstein, André Gide, Horace Gregory, Osbert Sitwell and Eric Walter White. White's essay was probably the first substantial critique of Bertolt Brecht published in English. It continued to publish major figures, including Henry Miller and Dylan Thomas and was the first British magazine to publish emerging young American poets such as Elizabeth Bishop and Muriel Rukeyser. Life and Letters To-day was not a typical modernist "little magazine". The initial circulation as a quarterly was nearly 3000 per issue, and the magazine was stocked by major retailers such as W.H. Smith and Menzies. When the title switched to monthly publication in autumn 1938, Smith's alone increased their order by 1000 copies an issue. In March 1939 Brendin purchased the failing London Mercury and Bookman titles and incorporated them to the journal. The magazine reverted to its pre-Bryher title, Life and Letters later in World War II and Herring remained editor until its closure in 1950.

Herring became close friends of the Pool Group (H.D., Bryher and Kenneth Macpherson), having associated with them since their interest in experimental film in the late 1920s. Bryher paid for Herring's psychoanalysis in London with the Freudian analyst Walter Schmideberg between 1935 and 1939.

Herring played the pianist in Macpherson's avant-garde production, Borderline (1930).

Herring died in a fire at his flat in Chelsea, London in December 1975, which destroyed his personal archive.

== Works ==
- The President's Hat (1926)
- Films Of The Year (1927)
- Films of the Year, 1927 – 1928 (1929)
- Adam and Evelyn at Kew, or Revolt in the Gardens (Elkin Mathews & Marrot, 1930) (Colour illustrations by Edward Bawden)
- Cactus Coast (1934) novel
- Cinema Survey (with Dallas Bower and Bryher).
- Harlequin Mercutio, Or, A Plague on Both Your Houses (A Ride Through Raids to Resurrection)(1943)
- The Impecunious Captain or Love as Liv'd (1944)
- Westward Look.Poems 1922-45 (1945)
