= Mary Chadwick =

British nurse and psychoanalyst

Mary Chadwick (died 1943) was a British nurse and psychoanalyst, characterised by Edward Glover as "the founder of child-analysis in Britain". A friend of the poet H.D., she analysed their work in 1931.

== Life ==
Chadwick was introduced to psychotherapy by the Medico-Psychological Clinic, receiving her first analysis there from Julia Turner. She delivered a paper on child analysis to the inaugural British Psychoanalytic Society meeting in 1919. In 1920 she accompanied James Strachey, Edward Glover and Ella Freeman Sharpe to Berlin, where she underwent analysis with Hanns Sachs. She started seeing children in therapy in 1922, and became an Associate Member of the BPAS in 1923.

In the mid-1920s Chadwick wrote a pair of essays on the sexual motivations underlying curiosity, characterising the male will to know as envious of the female ability to give birth. Her argument here influenced Melanie Klein, who later also reviewed Chadwick's book on menstruation.

In 1930 Chadwick befriended the poet H.D., the novelist Bryher and the filmmaker Kenneth Macpherson. H.D., Bryher and MacPherson collaborated in film production as the Pool Group, and Chadwick wrote for their magazine, Close Up, in 1931. Bryher paid for both Kenneth Macpherson and H.D. to go into analysis with Chadwick. H.D. saw Chadwick for 24 sessions, from April to July 1931, before ending analysis abruptly. She found Chadwick's mixing of analysis and friendship distressing, and seems to have associated her with 'sadism'. By comparison with Hanns Sachs, with whom H.D. entered analysis at the end of the year, H.D. also felt Chadwick was hampered by an English moralism:

I like Chaddie, love her [...] but rock-bottom she is ENGLISH [...] perhaps that is the worst and the best to say of anyone.

— H.D. to Bryher, 2 June 1931.

[Sachs] is terribly kind and helpful, just the person for me, as he ties it all up into a dramatic whole, while with poor Chaddie a lot of subterranean 'morality' somehow had to creep in.

— H.D. to Bryher, 3 December 1931.

Chadwick died suddenly in May 1943.

== Works ==
- 'A Case of Kleptomania in a Girl of Ten Years', International Journal of Psycho-Analysis, Vol. 6 (1925), pp. 300–312
- 'Über die Wurzel der Wissbegierde' [On the origin of curiosity], Internationale Zeitschrift für Psychoanalyse, Vol. 11 (1925), pp. 54–68.
- 'Notes upon the Acquisition of Knowledge', Psychoanalytic Review, Vol. 13 (1926), pp. 257–80.
- 'Ein Experiment in einem Kindergarten', Zeitschrift für psychoanalytische Pädagogik, Vol. 1, No. 11-12 (1927), pp. 350–357.
- 'Die Gott-Phantasie bei Kindern', Imago, Vol. 13 (1927), pp. 383–394.
- Difficulties in child development. London: G. Allen & Unwin, Ltd, 1928.
- 'Die Unterscheidung zwischen Ton und Sprache in der frühen Kindheit', Zeitschrift für psychoanalytische Pädagogik, Vol. 2 (1928), pp. 369–83.
- 'Notes upon the Fear of Death', International Journal of Psycho-Analysis, Vol. 10 (1929), pp. 321–34.
- 'Die Erziehung der Erzieher' [The education of the educators], Zeitschrift für psychoanalytische Pädagogik, Vol. 4 (1930), pp. 356–370.
- Nursing Psychological Patients. London, 1931.
- 'Menstruationsangst', Zeitschrift für psychoanalytische Pädagogik, Vol. 5 (1931), pp. 184–189.
- 'My First Sound Film', Close Up, Vol. 8. No. 1, 1931.
- The Psychological Effects of Menstruation. New York: Nervous and Mental Disease Pub. Co., 1932.
- Adolescent Girlhood. London: G. Allen & Unwin Ltd., 1932.
- Women's Periodicity. London, 1933.
- Chapters about Childhood. The Psychology of Children from 5–10 Years. London, 1939.
- The Toddler in the Home. London, 1940.
