= Paul Robeson filmography =

Movies and documentaries in which Paul Robeson has either starred, narrated or been featured and those that were film projects he was involved.

== Films ==
Year	Title	Role	Director	Producer
1925	Body and Soul	Reverend Isaiah T. Jenkins / His brother Sylvester	Oscar Micheaux	Micheaux Film Corporation
1926	Camille	Himself (cameo)	Ralph Barton	Warner Bros. Pictures
1930	Borderline	Pete Varond, a Negro	Kenneth MacPherson	The Pool Group
1933	The Emperor Jones	Brutus Jones	Dudley Murphy	Gifford Cochran
1935	Sanders of the River	Bosambo	Zoltán Korda	Alexander Korda
1936	Showboat	Joe	James Whale	Carl Laemmle Jr.
1936	Song of Freedom	John Zinga	J. Elder Wills	H. Fraser Passmore
1937	Big Fella	Banjo	J. Elder Wills	British Lion Films Corporation
1937	King Solomon's Mines	King Umpoba	Robert Stevenson	Gaumont-British
1937	My Song Goes Forth	Himself (Narrator)	Joseph Best	Ambassador Films
1937	Jericho/Dark Sands	Jericho Jackson	Thornton Freeland	Capitol Films
1938	Canciones de Madrid	Himself (Documentary)	Juan Manuel Plaza	Estado Mayor, Comisariado del Ejército del Centro
1940	The Proud Valley	David Goliath	Pen Tennyson	Ealing Studios
1942	Tales of Manhattan	Luke	Julien Duvivier	Boris Morros
1942	Native Land	Narrator	Leo Hurwitz and Paul Strand	Leo Hurwitz and Paul Strand
1954	Das Lied der Ströme/The Song of the Rivers	Narrator/Song	Joris Ivens	DEFA (GDR)

== Documentaries ==
Year	Title	Role	Director	Producer
1977	The Tallest Tree in Our Forest	Himself	Gil Noble	Gil Noble
1979	Paul Robeson: Tribute to an Artist	Himself	Saul J. Turell	Jessica Berman and Saul J. Turell
1998	Paul Robeson: Speak of Me as I Am	Himself	Rachel Hermans	BBC Wales/New Jersey Public Television
1999	Paul Robeson: Here I Stand	Himself	St. Clair Bourne	Chris Schultz

== Projects ==
Year	Title	Involvement	Problem	Status
1934	Black Napoleon	Paul Robeson was reportedly attached to this 'historical drama' about Toussaint-Louverture, liberator of Colonial Haiti.	The film was to be directed by Sergei Eisenstein and he and Robeson discussed the idea at length during Robeson's first trip the Soviet Union in December 1934. Boris Shumyatsky, the Soviet head of film had it listed in the export catalogue of Intorgkino, the USSR's international film source.	film never made
1936	Oliver Law Film	Robeson wanted to do a bio-pic on the African American communist, labor organizer, and social activist, Oliver Law who fought with the Abraham Lincoln Brigade after hearing about his heroism during the Spanish Civil War.	Robeson was unable to find the financial backing saying that the "Motion Picture industry, and so refuse to allow such a story," preferring to profitable films of "mediocre entertainment."	film never made
1958	Othello Film	Robeson was reportedly going to finally bring his renowned portrayal of Othello to the big screen in a Soviet backed production.	Robeson fell ill before pre-production commenced and he had other artistic commitments to fulfill once he was well again..	film never made
1959	The Blacks	Robeson was considered for the lead role in the film version of the comedy play The Blacks by the French dramatist Jean Genet.	Robeson and his wife/manager, Eslanda Cardozo Goode, reviewed the film script and declined.	film never made
