= Berman brothers (painters) =

Russian painters

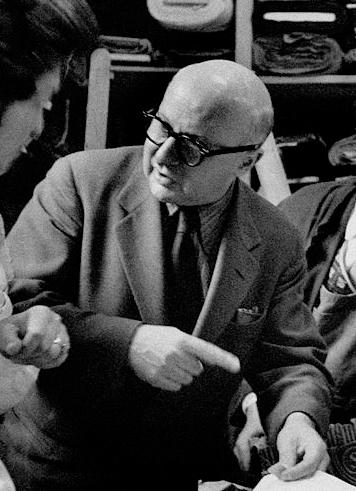
Eugene Berman in Italy in the 1960s

Eugène Berman (Russian: Евгений Густавович Берман; 4 November 1899, Saint Petersburg, Russia – 14 December 1972, Rome) and his brother Leonid Berman (1896 – 1976) were Russian Neo-romantic painters and theater and opera designers.

== Early years ==
Born in Russia, the Bermans studied art in Europe, before returning to begin their formal art education with the Russian realist painter P.S. Naumoff. They fled the Russian Revolution in 1918. In Paris the Bermans exhibited at the Galerie Pierre where their work earned them the name "Neo-Romantics" for its melancholy and introspective qualities, having taken inspiration from the Blue Period paintings of Pablo Picasso. Other Neo-Romantic painters were Christian Bérard, Pavel Tchelitchev, Kristians Tonny and, later in America, their friend Muriel Streeter (wife of their art dealer Julien Levy).

Eugène's work was characterized by lonely landscapes featuring sculptural and architectural elements, often ruins, rendered in a neo-classical manner, whereas that of Leonid depicted beaches with fisherman's boats and nets in many parts of the world. In 1935 Eugène left for New York where he exhibited frequently at the Julien Levy Gallery (as did Leonid after the war). Later, in the 1940s, Eugène settled in Los Angeles and married the actress Ona Munson, while Leonid remained in New York and married the harpsichordist Sylvia Marlowe. In 1950 he exhibited at Instituto de Arte Moderno, Buenos Aires. In 1950, Eugene Berman was elected into the National Academy of Design as an Associate member, and became a full member in 1954.

== Later years and death ==
In America, Eugène became well known as a stage designer for ballet and opera. Following the suicide of his wife in 1955, he moved to Rome where Princess Doria-Pamphilj provided an apartment and studio for him in a wing of her palazzo on the via del Corso. In 1957 he was working with Sylvia Guirey on a new production for the Metropolitan Opera of Don Giovanni. Berman continued to paint in Italy until his death in 1972. Leonid died in New York in 1976.

=== Works ===
- Ballet Imperial by George Balanchine, Sadler's Wells Ballet, London (1950).

== Legacy ==
Eugene Berman's work can be found in a number of institutions, including:

- McNay Art Museum
- Museum of Modern Art
- Art Institute of Chicago
- Hirshhorn Museum and Sculpture Garden

== See also ==
- Christian Bérard
