= A Colour Box =

Animated film by Len Lye

- Directed by: Len Lye
- Produced by: John Grierson
- Music by: Don Barreto and his Cuban Orchestra
- Production company: GPO Film Unit
- Release date: 6 September 1935
- Running time: 3 minutes
- Country: United Kingdom

A Colour Box is a 1935 British experimental animated film by Len Lye. Commissioned to promote the General Post Office, it was Lye's first direct animation to receive a public release.

== Production ==
In mid 1935, Lye struck a deal with John Grierson to make a direct animation for the GPO Film Unit. Lye was paid £30, with his materials paid for by the GPO.

Lye and sound editor Jack Ellitt went through hundreds of records looking for music to use as the soundtrack. They selected a beguine called "The Belle Creole" by Don Barreto and his Cuban Orchestra. After the music was transferred to film, Lye made cue marks on the sound track, which he used as a guide as he painted on the image track.

Lye painted long, continuous patterns on the 35 mm film stock, without frame lines to separate individual film frames and with few splices used. He used combs or sticks to create linear patterns on the film stock. It took him five days to finish most of the film. Before settling on the title A Colour Box, Lye used the titles Cheaper Parcel Post and La Belle Creole.

== Release ==
A Colour Box was first shown to critics and journalists on 6 September 1935. Cinema owners were hesitant to screen the work because of its experimental approach and promotional nature. The Granada Theatre and the Tatler Cinema were among the first to screen it.

The film had its international premiere in October 1935 at the International Cinema Festival in Brussels. The jury created a special "fantasy film" category so that they could award A Colour Box with a Medal of Honour. The film was later screened at the 1936 Venice Film Festival, where Nazi viewers labeled it degenerate art and protested the film. They stomped their feet loudly, leading to the three-minute film being stopped before its completion.

== Reception ==
Contemporary reactions to A Colour Box were polarised. Many critics recognised its originality but viewed it as little more than a novelty. Robert Herring called it "the first ballet in film". One review in Sight & Sound said that Lye had "stirred the abstract film to a new vitality."

Canadian animator Norman McLaren carefully studied the film, inspired by Lye's "technical inventiveness". It became a major influence on his own direct filmmaking practices.
