= Dorothea Tanning =

American painter, printmaker and sculptor (1910–2012)

- Max Ernst and Dorothea Tanning in 1948. Photo by Robert Bruce Inverarity in the Smithsonian Institution collection.
- Born: Dorothea Margaret Tanning; 25 August 1910; Galesburg, Illinois, U.S.
- Died: 31 January 2012 (aged 101); New York City, U.S.
- Known for: Painting, sculpture, printmaking, writing
- Movement: Surrealism
- Spouses: Homer Shannon (m. 1941, divorced) Max Ernst (m. 1946; died 1976)

Dorothea Margaret Tanning (25 August 1910 – 31 January 2012) was an American painter, printmaker, sculptor, writer and poet, whose early work was inspired by Surrealism.

== Biography ==
Dorothea Tanning, Birthday, 1942, oil on canvas, 40 1/4 x 25 1/2 in./102.2 x 64.8 cm, Philadelphia Museum of Art. ©The Estate of Dorothea Tanning

Dorothea Tanning was born and raised in Galesburg, Illinois. She was the second of three daughters to Andrew Peter Tanning (born Andreas Peter Georg Thaning; 1875–1943) and Amanda Marie Hansen (1879–1967), who named her for her maternal grandmother. Both of her parents were immigrants from Sweden. After graduating from Galesburg Public High School in 1926 and working in the Galesburg Public Library in 1927, she attended Knox College in Illinois for two years beginning in 1928. In 1930, she left to pursue an artistic career in Chicago, where she attended art classes for several weeks before determining to teach herself to paint.

Tanning moved to New York City in 1935, where she supported herself as a commercial artist while working on her own paintings. There, Tanning discovered Surrealism at the Museum of Modern Art's seminal 1936 exhibition, Fantastic Art, Dada and Surrealism. In 1941, she was married briefly to the writer Homer Shannon in 1941, after an eight-year relationship. That year, impressed by her creativity and talent in illustrating fashion advertisements, the art director at Macy's department store introduced her to the gallery owner Julien Levy, who immediately offered to show her work. (Tanning would also become good friends with Levy and his wife, the painter Muriel Streeter, as seen in letters they exchanged in the 1940s.) Tanning presented two solo exhibitions (in 1944 and 1948) with Levy; Levy also introduced her to the circle of émigré Surrealists whose work he was showing in his gallery, including the German painter Max Ernst.

Tanning first met Ernst at a party in 1942. Later he dropped by her studio to consider her work for inclusion in the 1943 Exhibition by 31 Women at the Art of This Century gallery in New York., which was owned by Peggy Guggenheim, Ernst's wife at the time. As Tanning recounts in her memoirs, he was enchanted by her iconic self-portrait Birthday (1942, Philadelphia Museum of Art). The two played chess, fell in love, and embarked on a life together that took them to Sedona in Arizona, and later to France. They lived in New York for several years before moving to Sedona, where they built a house and hosted visits from many friends crossing the country, including Henri Cartier-Bresson, Lee Miller, Roland Penrose, Yves Tanguy, Kay Sage, Pavel Tchelitchew, George Balanchine, and Dylan Thomas. Tanning and Ernst were married in 1946 in a double wedding with Man Ray and Juliet Browner in Hollywood, and they stayed married for 30 years.

In 1949, Tanning and Ernst relocated to France, where they divided their time between Paris and Touraine, returning to Sedona for intervals through the early and mid-1950s. They lived in Paris and later, Provence, until Ernst's death in 1976 (he had suffered a stroke a year earlier), after which Tanning returned to New York. She continued to create studio art in the 1980s, then turned her attention to her writing and poetry in the 1990s and 2000s, working and publishing until the end of her life. Tanning died on January 31, 2012, in her Manhattan home at age 101.

In 1997, The Dorothea Tanning Foundation was established with a mission to preserve the artist’s legacy and foster a broader public understanding of her contributions in the visual and literary arts. The Foundation works in tandem with The Destina Foundation, which was established in New York in 2015 to manage and distribute the art and assets of Dorothea Tanning’s Estate for philanthropic purposes.

=== Artistic career ===
Dorothea Tanning, Some Roses and their Phantoms, 1952, oil on canvas, 29 7/8 x 40 1/4 in./76.3 x 101.5 cm, Tate Modern.

The surreal imagery of Tanning's paintings from the 1940s and her close friendships with artists and writers of the Surrealist Movement have led many to regard Tanning as a Surrealist painter, yet she developed her own individual style over the course of an artistic career that spanned six decades.

Tanning's early works—paintings such as Birthday and Eine Kleine Nachtmusik (1943, Tate Modern, London)—were precise figurative renderings of dream-like situations. Tanning read many Gothic and Romantic novels from her local library in her hometown of Galesburg. These fantastical stories, filled with imagery of the imaginary, heavily influenced her style and subject matter for years to come. Like other Surrealist painters, she was meticulous in her attention to details and in building up surfaces with carefully muted brushstrokes. Through the late 1940s, she continued to paint depictions of unreal scenes, some of which combined erotic subjects with enigmatic symbols and desolate space. During this period she formed enduring friendships with, among others, Marcel Duchamp, Joseph Cornell, and John Cage. She also designed sets and costumes for several of George Balanchine's ballets, including The Night Shadow (the original version of his ballet La Sonnambula, which premiered in 1946 at City Center of Music and Drama in New York), and performed in two of Hans Richter's avant-garde films, Dreams That Money Can Buy (1947) and 8 x 8: A Chess Sonata in 8 Movements (1957).

Over the next decade, Tanning's painting evolved, becoming less explicit and more suggestive. Now working in Paris and Huismes, France, she began to move away from Surrealism and develop her own style. During the mid-1950s, her work radically changed and her images became increasingly fragmented and prismatic, exemplified in works such as Insomnias (1957, Moderna Museet, Stockholm). As she explains, "Around 1955 my canvases literally splintered... I broke the mirror, you might say".

Dorothea Tanning, Hôtel du Pavot, Chambre 202 (Poppy Hotel, Room 202) 1970-73, mixed media, 133 7/8 x 122 1/8 x 185 in./340 x 310 x 470 cm, Musée National d'Art Moderne, Centre Georges Pompidou, Paris, ©The Estate of Dorothea Tanning

By the late 1960s, Tanning’s paintings were almost completely abstract, yet always suggestive of the female form. From 1969 to 1973, Tanning embarked on what she described as "an intense five-year adventure in soft sculpture," concentrating on a body of three-dimensional works in fabric, a departure from traditional, harder, longer-lasting sculptural materials. In an interview, she stated that her soft sculptures signified 'cloth as a material for high purpose' and rejoiced at 'softness over hardness'. Five of these soft or 'living' sculptures comprise the installation Hôtel du Pavot, Chambre 202 (1970–73) that is now in the permanent collection of the Musée National d'Art Moderne at the Centre Georges Pompidou, Paris. During her time in France in the 1950s to 1970s, Tanning also became an active printmaker, working in ateliers of Georges Visat and Pierre Chave and creating work for a number of limited edition artists' books by such poets as Alain Bosquet, Rene Crevel, Lena Leclerq, and André Pieyre de Mandiargues. After her husband's death in 1976, Tanning remained in France for several years with a renewed concentration on her painting. By 1980, she had relocated her home and studio to New York and embarked on an energetic creative period in which she produced paintings, drawings, collages, and prints.

Tanning's work has been recognized in numerous one-person exhibitions, both in the United States and in Europe, including major retrospectives in 1974 at the Centre National d’Art Contemporain in Paris (which became the Centre Georges Pompidou in 1977), and in 1993 at the Malmö Konsthall in Sweden and then at the Camden Arts Centre in London. The New York Public Library mounted a retrospective of Tanning's prints in 1992, and the Philadelphia Museum of Art mounted a small retrospective exhibition in 2000 entitled Birthday and Beyond to mark its acquisition of Tanning’s celebrated 1942 self-portrait, Birthday. In 2018, Museo Nacional Centro de Arte Reina Sofía, Madrid, held a major exhibition of the artist’s work, which travelled to the Tate Modern, London in 2019.

=== Literary career ===
Dorothea Tanning, Etched Murmurs, 1984, oil on canvas, 12 2/5 × 8 1/4 in./31.4 x 21 cm, Spaightwood Galleries.

Tanning wrote stories and poems throughout her life, with her first short story published in VVV in 1943 and original poems accompanying her etchings in the limited edition books Demain (1964) and En chair et en or (1973). However, it was after her return to New York in the 1980s that she began to focus on her writing. In 1986, she published her first memoir, entitled Birthday for the painting that had figured so prominently in her biography. It has since been translated into four other languages. In 2001, she wrote an expanded version of her memoir called Between Lives: An Artist and Her World.

With the encouragement of the poet James Merrill, who was her friend and mentor, Tanning began to write her own poetry in her 80s, and her poems were published regularly in literary reviews and magazines such as The Yale Review, Poetry, The Paris Review, and The New Yorker until the end of her life. A collection of her poems, A Table of Content, and a short novel, Chasm: A Weekend, were both published in 2004. Her second collection of poems, Coming to That, was published by Graywolf Press in 2011.

In 1994, Tanning endowed the Wallace Stevens Award of the Academy of American Poets, an annual prize of $100,000 awarded to a poet in recognition of outstanding and proven mastery in the art of poetry.

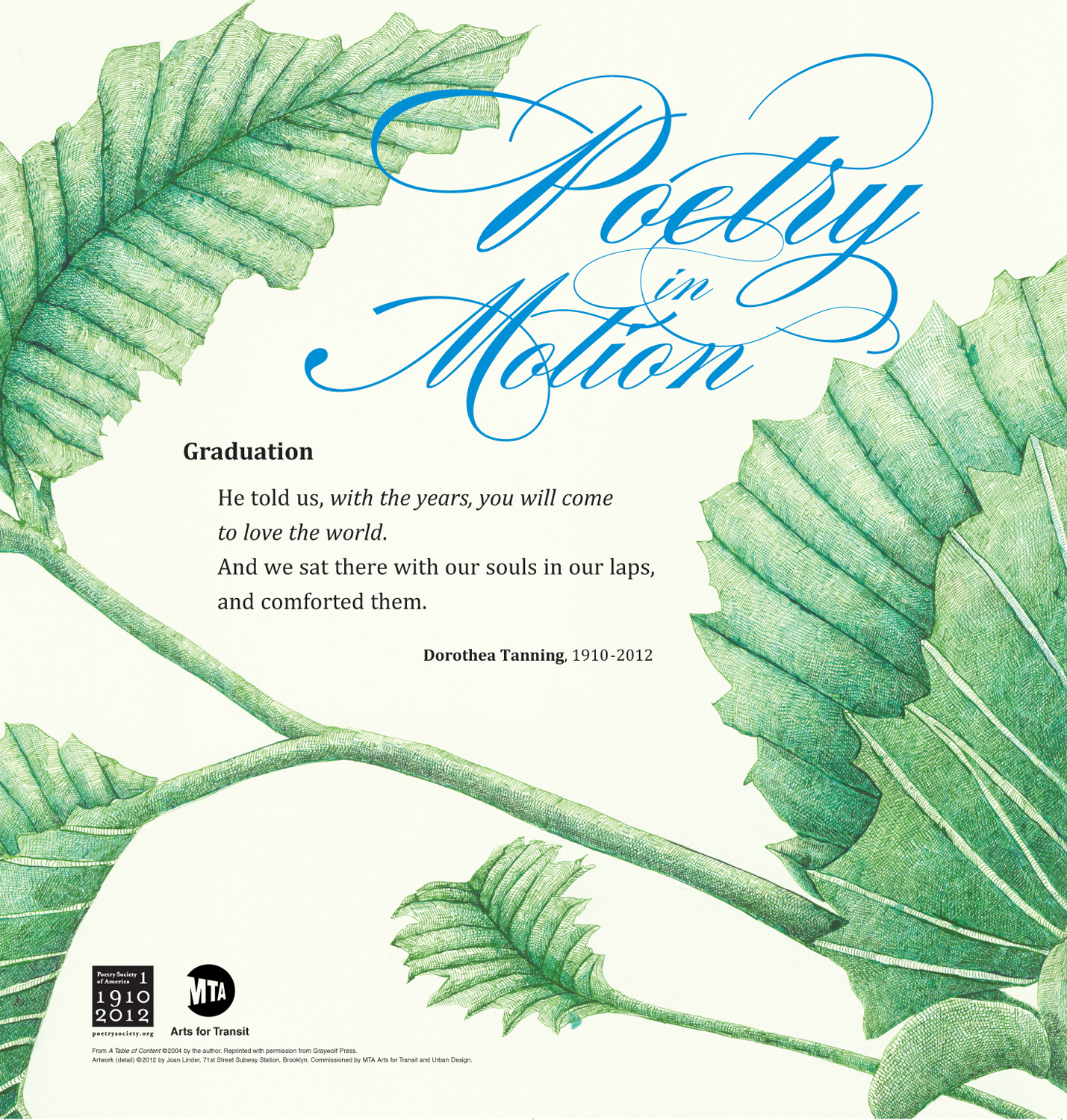
"Graduation" by Dorothea Tanning

== Bibliography ==
=== Books by Dorothea Tanning ===
- Abyss. New York: Standard Editions, 1977. ISBN 0918746027
- Birthday. Santa Monica: The Lapis Press, 1986. ISBN 0932499163 (memoir)
- Between Lives: An Artist and Her World. New York: W.W. Norton, 2001. ISBN 0-393-05040-8 (memoir)
- Chasm: A Weekend. New York: Overlook Press, and London: Virago Press, 2004. ISBN 1-58567-584-9 (novel)
- A Table of Content: Poems. New York: Graywolf Press, 2004. ISBN 1-55597-402-3 (collection of poems)
- Coming to That: Poems, New York: Graywolf Press, 2011. ISBN 978-1-55597-601-9 (collection of poems)

=== Monographs ===
- Bosquet, Alain. La Peinture de Dorothea Tanning. Paris: Jean-Jacques Pauvert, 1966.
- Plazy, Giles. Dorothea Tanning. Paris: Editions Filipacchi, 1976 and (English translation) 1979. ISBN 2850181684
- Dorothea Tanning: Numéro Spécial de XXe Siècle. Paris: Editions XXe Siècle, 1977.
- Bailly, Jean Christopher, John Russell, and Robert C. Morgan. Dorothea Tanning. New York: George Braziller, 1995. ISBN 0807614025
- McAra, Catriona. A Surrealist Stratigraphy of Dorothea Tanning’s Chasm. London: Routledge, 2017. ISBN 1472463447
- Carruthers, Victoria. Dorothea Tanning: Transformations. London: Lund Humphries, 2020. ISBN 9781848221741
- Lyford, Amy. Exquisite Dreams: The Art and Life of Dorothea Tanning. London: Reaktion Books, 2024. ISBN 9781789147971

=== Exhibition catalogues ===
- Waldberg, Patrick. Dorothea Tanning, Casino Communal, XXe Festival Belge D'Été. Brussels: André de Rache, 1967.
- Jouffroy. Alain. Dorothea Tanning: Oeuvre. Paris: Centre National D'Art Contemporain, 1974.
- Dorothea Tanning: 10 Recent Paintings and a Biography. New York: Gimpel-Weitzenhoffer Gallery, 1979.
- Dorothea Tanning on Paper, 1948-1986. New York: Kent Fine Art, 1987.
- Eleven Paintings by Dorothea Tanning. New York: Kent Fine Art, 1988.
- Dorothea Tanning: Between Lives--Works on Paper. London: Runkel-Hue-Williams Ltd., 1989.
- Waddell, Roberta, and Louisa Wood Ruby, eds., with texts by Donald Kuspit and Dorothea Tanning. Dorothea Tanning: Hail Delirium! A Catalogue Raisonné of the Artist’s Illustrated Books and Prints, 1942-1991. New York: The New York Public Library, 1992. ISBN 0871044307
- Nordgren, Sune, John Russell, Alain Jouffroy, Jean-Christophe Bailly, and Lasse Söderberg. Dorothea Tanning: Om Konst Kunde Tala (If Art Could Talk). Malmö, Sweden: Malmö Konsthall, 1993. ISBN 9177040597
- Dorothea Tanning: Insomnias, Paintings from 1954 to 1965. New York: Kent Fine Art, 2005. ISBN 1878607952
- Dorothea Tanning: Beyond the Esplanade: Paintings, Drawings and Prints from 1940 to 1965. San Francisco: Frey Norris Gallery, 2009. ISBN 9780982393246
- Greskovic, Robert, Joanna Kleinberg, and Rachel Liebowitz. Dorothea Tanning: Early Designs for the Stage. New York: The Drawing Center, 2010. ISBN 0942324560
- Dorothea Tanning: Unknown but Knowable States. San Francisco: Gallery Wendi Norris, 2013. ISBN 0615720900
- Dorothea Tanning: Web of Dreams. London: Alison Jacques Gallery, 2014. ISBN 0957226942
- Mahon, Alyce, ed., with Ann Coxon and Idoia Murga Castro. Dorothea Tanning. Madrid: Museo Nacional Centro de Arte Reina Sofía, 2018 ISBN 9788480265751 and London: Tate Publishing, 2018. ISBN 9781849766432
- Dorothea Tanning: Doesn't the Paint Say It All? New York: Kasmin Gallery, 2022. ISBN 9781947232983

== Interviews ==
In a 2002 interview for Salon.com in response to: "So what have you tried to communicate as an artist? What were your goals, and have you achieved them?" Tanning replies: "I’d be satisfied with having suggested that there is more than meets the eye." And in response to: "What do you think of some of the artwork being produced today?" Tanning replies: "I can’t answer that without enraging the art world. It’s enough to say that most of it comes straight out of dada, 1917. I get the impression that the idea is to shock. So many people laboring to outdo Duchamp’s urinal. It isn’t even shocking anymore, just kind of sad."

When speaking on her relationship with Ernst in an interview, Tanning said: "I was a loner, am a loner, good Lord, it's the only way I can imagine working. And then when I hooked up with Max Ernst, he was clearly the only person I needed and, I assure you, we never, never talked art. Never."

"If it wasn’t known that I had been a Surrealist, I don’t think it would be evident in what I’m doing now. But I’m branded as a Surrealist. Tant pis."

"Women artists. There is no such thing—or person. It’s just as much a contradiction in terms as "man artist" or "elephant artist". You may be a woman and you may be an artist; but the one is a given and the other is you."

"Art has always been the raft onto which we climb to save our sanity."

== Public collections ==
- Centre Georges Pompidou / Musée National d'Art Moderne, Paris
- Hood Museum of Art, Hanover, New Hampshire
- Los Angeles County Museum of Art
- The Menil Collection, Houston
- Moderna Museet, Stockholm
- Musée d’Art Moderne de la Ville de Paris
- Museum of Modern Art, New York
- Nelson-Atkins Museum of Art, Kansas City, Missouri
- Philadelphia Museum of Art
- San Francisco Museum of Modern Art
- Scottish National Gallery of Modern Art, Edinburgh
- Smithsonian American Art Museum, Washington, D.C.
- Tate Modern, London
- Whitney Museum of American Art, New York

== See also ==
- List of centenarians (artists)
- Visionary art
- Magic realism
- Women Surrealists
