= 8 × 8: A Chess Sonata in 8 Movements =

1957 film by Jean Cocteau

- Directed by: Hans Richter
- Starring: Jean Arp Paul Bowles Ceal Bryson Alexander Calder Jean Cocteau Willem de Vogel Marcel Duchamp Dorothea Ernst Max Ernst Richard Huelsenbeck Frederick Kiesler Julien Lary Julien Levy Jaqueline Matisse Darius Milhaud Eugene Pellegrini Man Ray Yves Tanguy
- Music by: Robert Abramson John Gruen Douglas Townsend
- Release date: March 15, 1957
- Country: United States
- Language: English

8 × 8: A Chess Sonata in 8 Movements is a 1957 American experimental film directed by Hans Richter, with contributing work by Marcel Duchamp and Jean Cocteau that was released on March 15, 1957, in New York City. It features original music by Robert Abramson, John Gruen and Douglas Townsend.

Described by Richter as "part Freud, part Lewis Carroll", it is a fairy tale for the subconscious based on the game of chess. "8 × 8" in the title refers to the layout of a chessboard.

While living in New York, Hans Richter directed two feature films, Dreams That Money Can Buy (1947) and 8 × 8: A Chess Sonata in collaboration with Max Ernst, Cocteau, Paul Bowles, Fernand Léger, Alexander Calder, Duchamp, and others, which was partially filmed on the lawn of his summer house in Southbury, Connecticut.

== Content ==
8 × 8: A Chess Sonata in 8 Movements opens with a foreword appearing on the screen: "“This film deals with the world of fantasy. It is a fairy-tale for grown-ups. It explores the realm behind the magic mirror which served Lewis Carroll 100 years ago to stimulate your imagination. (...) This film has been produced by artists. We have made use of the traditional freedom of the artist to follow our inspiration.”

The film and screen are segmented in reference to the structure of a chess-board.

== Contributors ==
Several artists contributed to the film or appear in it:

- Jean Arp
- Paul Bowles
- Ceal Bryson
- Alexander Calder
- Jean Cocteau
- Willem de Vogel
- Marcel Duchamp
- Dorothea Ernst
- Max Ernst
- Richard Huelsenbeck
- Frederick Kiesler as the Minotaur
- Julien Lary
- Julien Levy
- Jaqueline Matisse
- Darius Milhaud
- Eugene Pellegrini
- Man Ray
- Yves Tanguy

== Screening ==
The film was screened on 7 March 1957 at the MoMa.

== See also ==
- List of avant-garde films of the 1950s
- List of works by Marcel Duchamp
