= Jimmie Daniels =

American cabaret performer, actor, model, and nightclub owner (1907–1984)

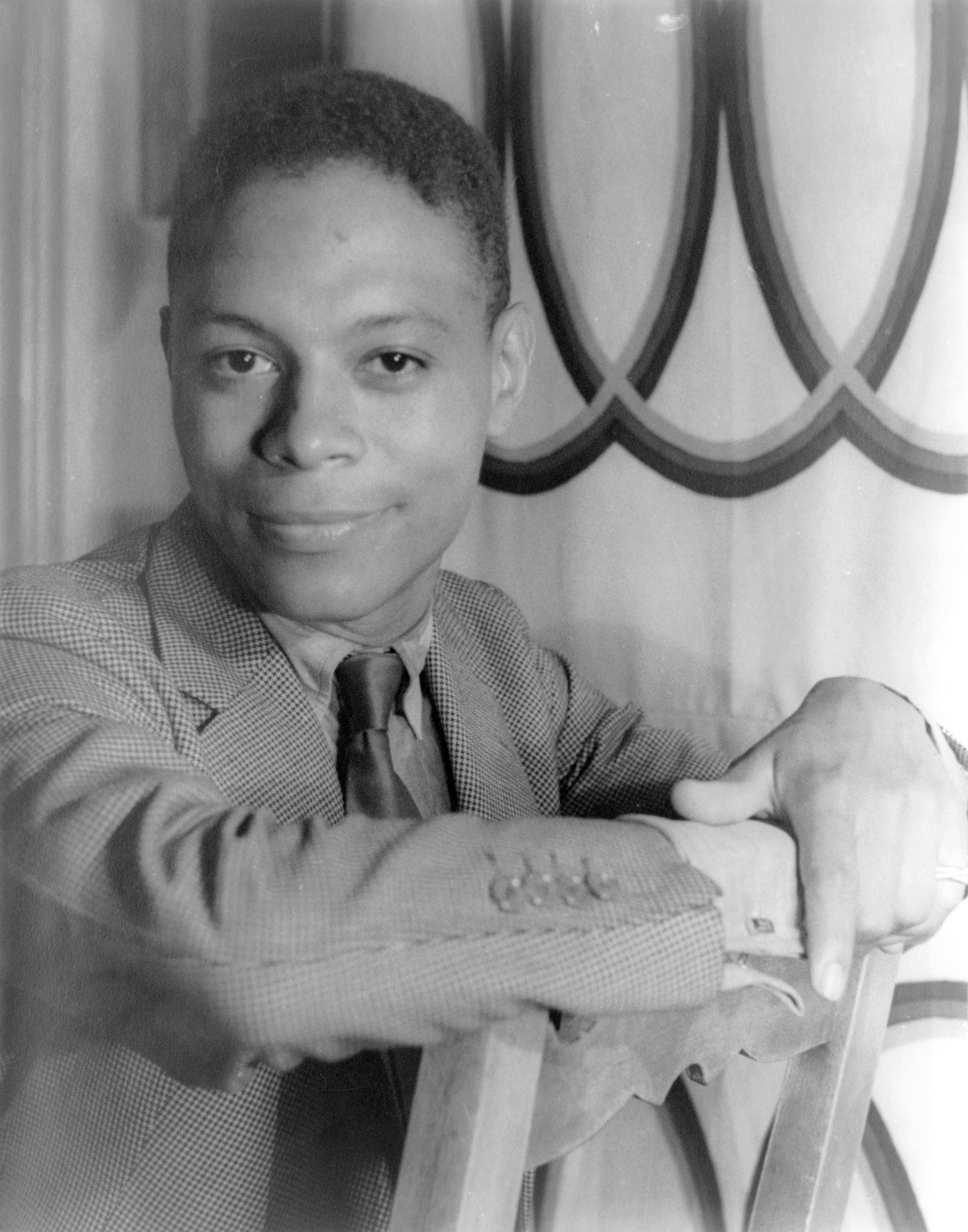
- Portrait by Carl Van Vechten (July 11, 1940)
- Born: November 23, 1907; Laredo, Texas, U.S.
- Died: June 29, 1984 (aged 76); New York, New York, U.S.

James Lesley Daniels (November 23, 1907 – June 29, 1984) was an American cabaret performer, actor, model, and nightclub owner, a part of the Harlem Renaissance.

== Early life and career ==
James Lesley Daniels was born in Laredo, Texas, in 1907. He grew up in Little Rock, Arkansas. In the 1920s he moved to New York City and joined the circles of the Harlem Renaissance. He also attended Bird's Business College in the Bronx.

After college, he went back to Little Rock and worked as secretary for A.E. Bush, president of the Century Life Insurance Company. In 1928, he was back to New York City to try a career on the stage. He performed in Katharine Cornell's Broadway play Dishonored Lady (1930), directed by Guthrie McClintic, in John Golden's production of Savage Rhythm (1931), and with the Chamberlain Brown Stock Company in Mount Vernon, New York. He then moved to cabaret singing and performed at Harlem's Hot Cha nightclub.

Jimmie Daniels performed primarily music by George Gershwin, Cole Porter, and Harold Arlen. He moved on the stages of New York, Paris, London and Monaco.

In 1933 and 1934, Daniels toured Europe and performed at different places like Summer Sporting Club in Monte Carlo and Ciro's in London (with Reginald Forsythe). Back in the United States he was the lead performer at Marian Cooley's Sunday night suppers at Ship Grill in New York. In 1935 he organized a series of parties at the Bronze Studio. At this time he met Herbert Jacoby who convinced him to go back to Europe and perform at Le Reubon Blue in Paris in 1936 and 1937, and again in 1938.

In 1939, he opened the Jimmie Daniels Nightclub at 114 West 116th Street in Harlem, which he managed until 1942 when he enlisted. During World War II, Daniels performed for the troops.

In 1950, Daniels became the lead performer at the Bon Soir in Greenwich Village, a place which attracted a mixed clientele—Black, White, straight, gay.

In the 1960s, he organized a series of parties at the L'Etang Supper Club in Downtown Manhattan. At the same time Jimmy Merry, prominent property owner of Cherry Grove, New York, hired Daniels to manage the Tiffany Room, now the Ice Palace. He also performed at the Blue Whale Bar in Fire Island Pines, New York. But a racist event, a cross burned in front of Daniels' home on the island, convinced him to drop this venture.

In the later 1970s, Daniels performed at parties and clubs like Jan Wallman's Restaurant in Greenwich Village.

== Personal life ==
In 1934, Daniels met Philip Johnson, already a prominent architect. Daniels was Johnson's first serious relationship. The relationship lasted one year and Johnson would recall later that "a terrible man stole him away—who had better sex with him, I gather. But I was naughty. I went to Europe and I would never think of taking Jimmie along."

Later Daniels was in a relationship with Kenneth Macpherson, filmmaker who was married with wealthy English heiress Annie Winifred Ellerman, also known as Bryher. Bryher commissioned Richmond Barthé to make a bust of Daniels. In the 1950s Daniels shared a home with fashion designer Rex Madsen.

Since 1925, Daniels was a good friend of Alberta Hunter and took care of her when she was old.

Jimmie Daniels died on June 29, 1984, just a few days after performing at the Kool Jazz Festival's Evening of the Music of Harold Arlen at Carnegie Hall.

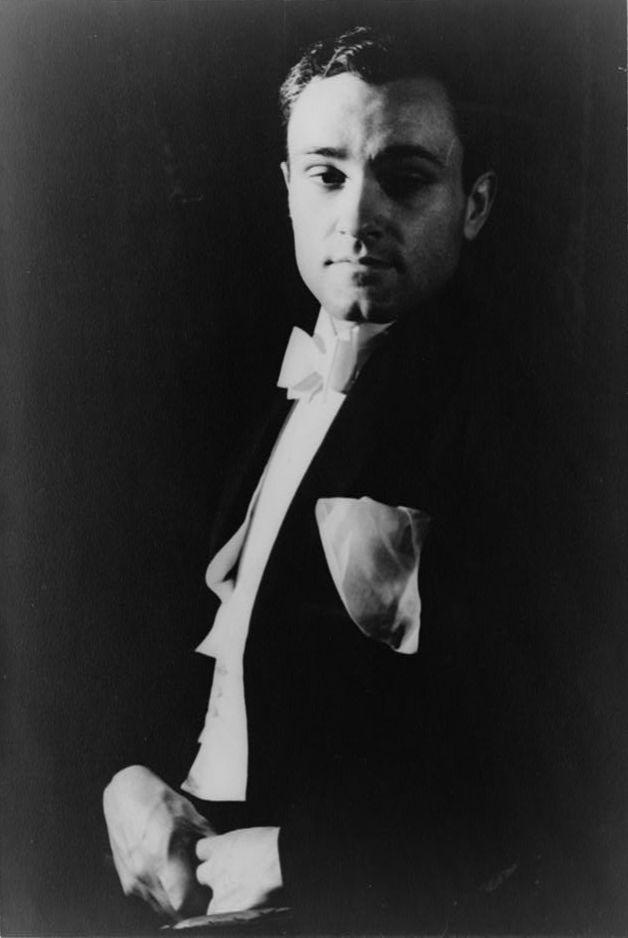
Philip Johnson by Carl Van Vechten, c.1933

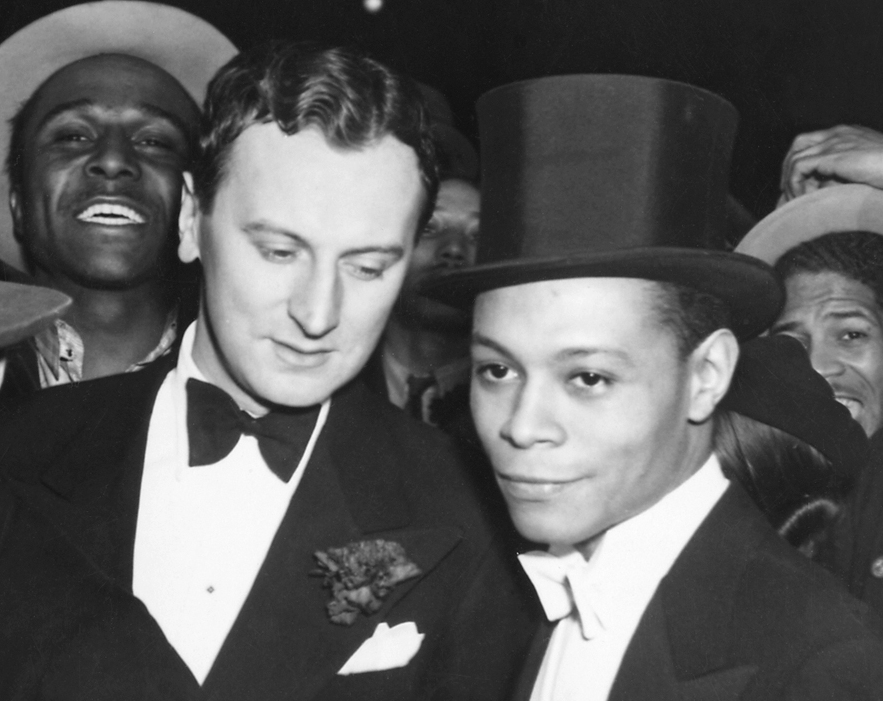
Kenneth Macpherson (left foreground) and Daniels at the opening of the Federal Theatre Project's production of Macbeth, April 14, 1936

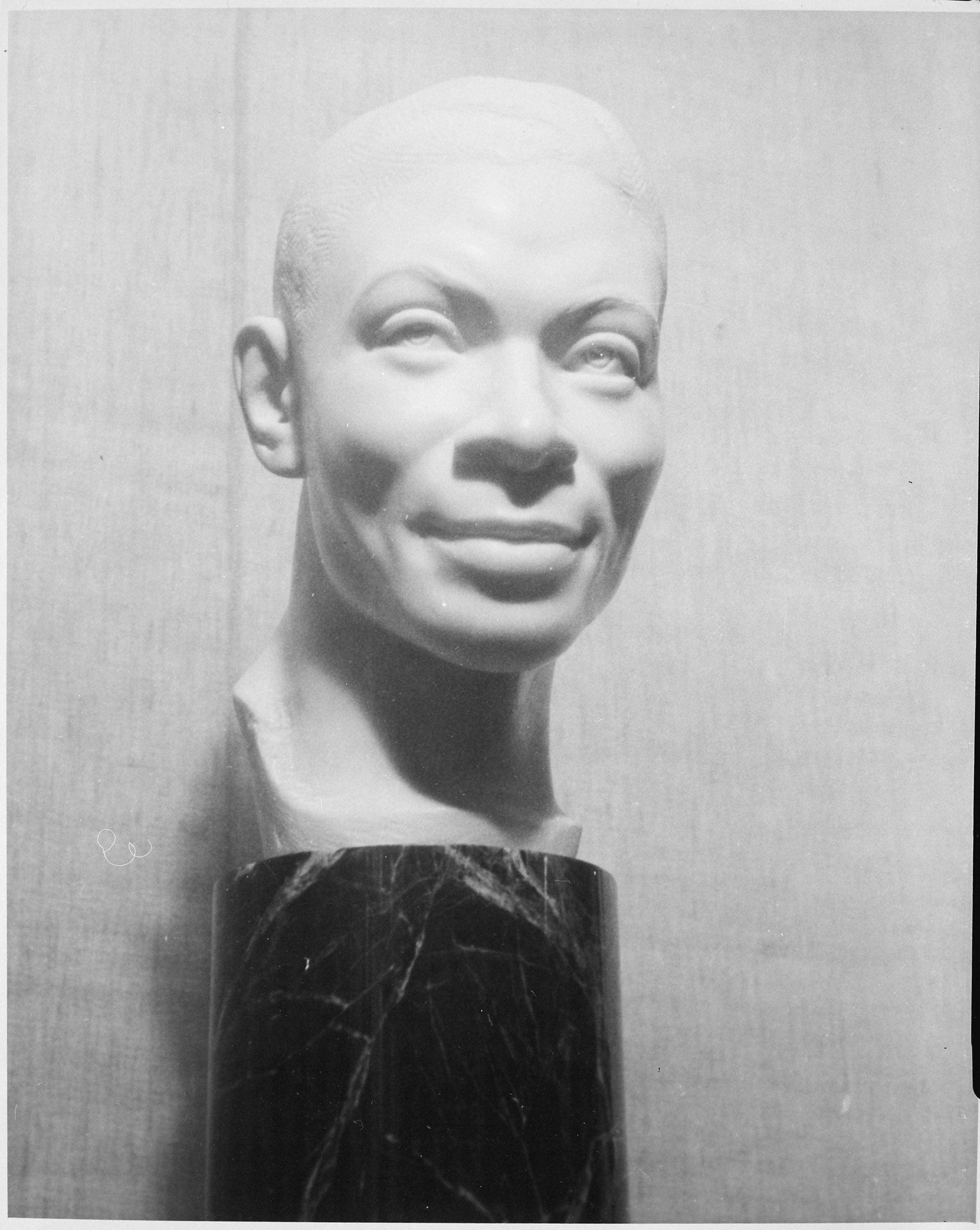
Jimmie, bust by Richmond Barthé, 1938
