= Susan McCabe =

American poet and scholar

Susan McCabe is an American poet and scholar. She is currently a professor of English at the University of Southern California.

== Life ==
Susan McCabe received her Ph.D. in literature at the University of California, Los Angeles. She has taught at the University of Oregon and Arizona State University. She currently lives in Los Angeles and teaches in the creative writing and literature PhD program at the University of Southern California.

== Work ==
McCabe's first book, Elizabeth Bishop: Her Poetics of Loss (Penn State University Press, 1994), was called by poet Donald Revell "the first book to present Bishop's poetry as a successful entirety, a coherent, humane, and progressive enterprise."

From 2005–2006 McCabe was president of the Modernist Studies Association. Focusing particularly on Modernist poetry, McCabe's books of criticism include Cinematic Modernism: Modern Poetry & Film (Cambridge University Press, 2005).

Her critical literary biography H.D. & Bryher: An Untold Love Story of Modernism was published by Oxford University Press in 2021.

She has published many reviews, including one of Brenda Hillman's work (Colorado Review) and a series of "eco-relations" reviews published by the Los Angeles Review of Books. She has written many articles on the topics of Alfred Hitchcock, Gertrude Stein, and other 20th century figures and cultural movements.

Her first book of poems, Swirl (2003), was nominated for a Lambda Literary Award. She won the Agha Shahid Ali Prize in Poetry from the University of Utah Press for Descartes' Nightmare in 2007, and it was published by the press in 2008.

== Honors ==
- Beinecke Library Research Fellowship, Yale University, 2005
- U.S. Scholar Grant, Fulbright Program, 2006
- Agha Shahid Ali Prize in Poetry, University of Utah Press, 2007
- Faculty Mentoring Graduate Students Award, University of Southern California, 2010
- John P. Birkelund Fellowship in the Humanities, American Academy in Berlin, 2011
- Maria Sutton Weeks Fellowship, Stanford Humanities Center, 2016

== Publications ==
- Elizabeth Bishop: Her Poetics of Loss, Penn State University Press, 1994.
- "Borderline Modernism: Paul Robeson and the Femme Fatale," Callaloo 25.2, Spring 2002.
- Swirl, Red Hen Press, 2003.
- "Introduction," Visa for Avalon, Bryher, reissued ed., Paris Press, 2004.
- Cinematic Modernism: Modern Poetry and Film, Cambridge University Press, 2005.
- Descartes' Nightmare: A Book of Poems, University of Utah Press, 2008.
- "'Say Can You See a Wind from the East': Gertrude Stein and a Feminist Is," Feminaissance, ed. Christine Wertheim, Les Figues Press, 2010.
- "Close Up and the Wars They Saw: From Visual Erotics to a Transferential Politics," The Space Between: Literature and Culture, 1914-1945 8.1, January 2013.
- "Luis Buñuel's Angel and Maya Deren's Meshes: Trance and the Cultural Imaginary," A Companion to Luis Buñuel, eds. Julián Daniel Gutiérrez-Albilla and Rob Stone, Wiley-Blackwell, 2013.
- "'Geographical Emotions': Bryher & Walter Benjamin, 'the last European,'" H.D.’s Trilogy and Beyond, eds. Hélène Aji, Antoine Cazé, Agnès Derail-Imbert, and Clément Oudart, Presses Universitaires de Paris Ouest, 2014.
