= Jack Ellitt =

British-Australian filmmaker and composer (1902–2001)

Jack Ellitt (20 May 1902 – 2001) was a British filmmaker, composer and musician. He was born Avrom Yitzhak Elitski to an orthodox Jewish Lithuanian family in Manchester and raised in Sydney from the age of 3.

== Career ==
Ellitt's career began with the New South Wales State Conservatorium of Music where he studied piano and violin and played bassoon in the conservatorium's orchestra.

In the early 1920s, Ellitt became friends with the New Zealand-born artist Len Lye, then resident in Sydney. Lye left Sydney for London in 1926 and Ellitt followed in 1927, settling into the same Hammersmith artistic circle as Lye. Through A. P. Herbert, Lye had obtained a job as stage hand at the Lyric Theatre and Ellitt took over this role upon his arrival in London while Lye dedicated more time to his practice.

Ellitt and Lye worked in collaboration through the next decade, with Ellitt serving as sound editor or composer on many of Lye's experimental short films. The first of these was Lye's debut film, Tusalava (1929), produced with support from the London Film Society. Ellitt composed a live, two-piano score for the 7-minute film. Tusalava's debut screening happened on 1 December 1929 at the New Gallery Cinema. Unhappy with the film society providing only one piano, Ellitt refused to participate as a pianist, leaving the other pianist to perform alone. He destroyed records of the score, rendering the film silent to this day. Lye later suggested Eugene Goossen's Rhythmic Dance. op. 30 could be a suitable approximation for what Ellitt had produced for the film.

Ellitt collaborated with Oswell Blakeston and Francis Bruguière on the film Light Rhythms (1931), composing the live piano score.

Further projects with Len Lye came in the 1930s with Ellitt contributing sound editing to all of Lye's GPO Film Unit productions alongside Full Fathom Five (1935), Kaleidoscope (1935) and Birth of the Robot (1936). During the production of the GPO's N or NW? (1937) the relationship between Ellitt and Lye soured and the two parted ways with Ellitt taking the role of chief editor at Strand Film Company, a production house specialising in documentary films. In 1942, Ellitt directed the ICI-sponsored Technicolor documentary, This Is Colour, alongside Jack Cardiff and Basil Wright.

Ellitt subsequently worked on hundreds of films for Strand and other companies while based in Sussex with his wife, Doris Harrison (previously a nanny working for Robert Graves).

He returned with Doris to Australia in the 1970s, living in Kincumber. Ellitt died in 2001.

== Compositions ==
Ellitt's work as a composer involved techniques such as drawn sound and musique concrète. In 1935 Ellitt outlined his musical practice in an essay called in On Sound published in Life and Letters, expressing a desire to "free our ears (from) tight-laced musical values" and anticipating future sound art practices where "good recording apparatus is easily acquired, many people will record simple everyday sounds which give them pleasure. The next step would be to mould these sound-snaps into formal continuity". Ellitt employed the term "Sound Construction" for his recordings.

Few of Ellitt's musical compositions are extant today, limiting a fuller perspective on his innovations in the field. It is possible Ellitt destroyed much of his work later in life, leaving just a handful of pieces for reference. All extant works by Ellitt have been published in Australia by Shame File Music.

=== Light Rhythms ===
The score for the live piano accompaniment to Blakeston and Bruguière's film Light Rhythms was published in Cantrill's Film Notes and a new synchronisation of the score with the film published in Bruce Posner and David Shepard's Unseen Cinema: Early American Avant-Garde Film 1894-1941 DVD set (2005).

=== Journey #1 ===
A recording demonstrating Ellitt's ideas from his 'On Sound' essay and the use of musical, concrete and synthetic sounds. The piece is identified by Len Lye biographer Roger Horrocks as a piece of soundtrack for an unfinished film collaboration between Lye, Basil Taylor, John Aldridge, Eustace Lewis, Norman Cobb and Ellitt called Quicksilver (1930–1934). A vinyl recording pressed in 1954 is archived in the National Film and Sound Archives of Australia.

=== Homage to Rachel Carson (part 2) ===
The second of two recordings inspired by the ecological writings of Rachel Carson, this 1987 piece narrates the life of Len Lye with spoken word by Ellitt interspersed with sound construction passages.

== Filmography ==
- Scotland Speaks (1941)
- This Is Colour (1942)
- Chasing the Blues (1946)
- Education of the Deaf (1946)

== Recordings ==
- Jack Ellitt Sound Constructions, Shame File Music, 2011
- Various Artists Artefacts of Australian Experimental Music: 1930 – 1973, Shame File Music, 2007
