= Standard Editions =

Standard Editions was a short-lived imprint founded in New York by the artists Constance DeJong and Dorothea Tanning.

== History ==
DeJong and Tanning were introduced by Mimi Johnson at a party in New York. They started Standard Editions together and published DeJong's Modern Love as well as an unpublished manuscript of Tanning's from 1947 called Abyss.

== Publications ==
- The Lucy Amarillo stories. Constance DeJong, 1978. ISBN 0-918746-03-5
- Abyss. Dorothea Tanning, 1977. ISBN 0918746027
- Modern Love. Constance DeJong, 1975–1977.
