= Eslanda Goode Robeson =

American anthropologist, author, actor and civil rights activist (1895–1965)

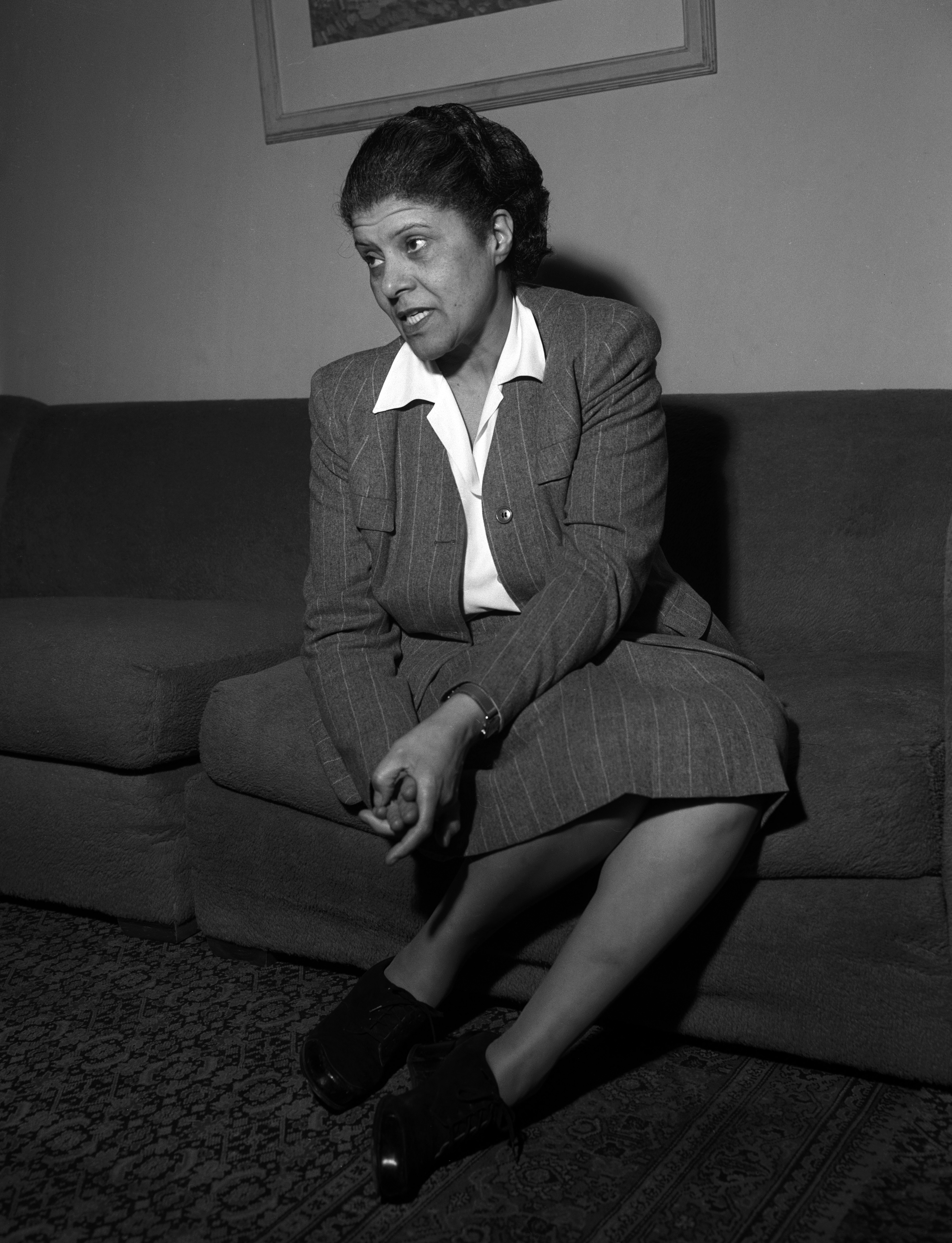
- Eslanda Robeson, c. 1947
- Born: Eslanda Cardozo Goode; December 15, 1895; Washington, D.C., U.S.
- Died: December 13, 1965 (aged 69); New York City, N.Y., U.S.
- Education: University of Illinois, Urbana-Champaign; Columbia University (BS); London School of Economics (MS); Hartford Seminary (PhD)
- Spouse: Paul Robeson (m. 1921)
- Children: Paul Robeson Jr.
- Scientific career
- Fields: Anthropology
- Workplaces: New York-Presbyterian Hospital

Eslanda "Essie" Cardozo Goode Robeson (December 15, 1895 – December 13, 1965) was an American anthropologist, author, actress, and civil rights activist. She was the wife and business manager of performer Paul Robeson.

== Biography ==
=== Early years and marriage ===
Eslanda Cardozo Goode was born in Washington, D.C., on December 15, 1895. Her maternal great-grandparents were Isaac Nunez Cardozo, a Sephardic Jew whose family was expelled from Spain in the 17th century, and Lydia Weston, who was of partial African descent and had been enslaved and then manumitted in 1826 by Plowden Weston in Charleston, South Carolina. Their son, Francis Lewis Cardozo, was the first black Secretary of State of South Carolina, and he married Catherine Romena Howell, daughter of an Englishwoman and a man of color from the West Indies. Their daughter, Eslanda Sarah Cardozo, married John Jacob Astor Goode, a law clerk in the War Department who later finished his law degree at Howard University. Eslanda Goode had two older brothers, John Jr. and Francis.

Eslanda attended the University of Illinois and later graduated from Columbia University in New York with a B.S. degree in chemistry. She first became politically active during her years at Columbia, when her own interest in racial equality was reinforced by young intellectuals in New York. While there, she began to work at New York-Presbyterian Hospital, she soon became the head histological chemist of Surgical Pathology, the first black person to hold such a position.

In 1920, Eslanda and Paul Robeson attended summer school at Columbia. They married one year later in August 1921. Eslanda gave up her intentions to study medicine and supported her husband as his business manager. Indeed, Paul credited her as the catalyst for his acting career, saying: "Even then, I never meant to [become an actor]. I just said yes to get her to quit pestering me." Eslanda worked at the hospital until 1925, when the career of her husband took more and more of her time. She spent time in Harlem, London and France in the following years.

The only child of the Robesons, Paul Jr, "Pauli" was born on November 2, 1927; Robeson was on a tour in Europe at that time. The marriage was strained and Eslanda suffered under the affairs of her husband that reportedly started with a relationship with Freda Diamond in 1925. Other affairs affecting their relationship were those with actresses Fredi Washington and Peggy Ashcroft. Robeson's long-term liaison with Yolanda Jackson almost broke up the marriage, and Eslanda even agreed to a divorce at one point. Despite all the setbacks and separations, the marriage endured, as each of the two had needs that only the other could fill. Eslanda chose to "rise above Paul's affairs", but to stay married to him and pursue her own career.

In the late 1920s, Eslanda wrote her first book, a first biography of her husband, titled Paul Robeson, Negro. It was published by Harper in 1930. Robeson, who had provided no direct input, was "deeply angered" by it. He resented that she put words into his mouth and depicted him as lazy, immature, and needy of her guidance. In the book, Robeson complains, "she treats me just as a ... small child", to which she replies "perhaps when you grow up I'll treat you as a man." She also addresses the issue of his infidelity, which he neither confirms or denies; she assures him that she feels that they have such a deep level of love, that past events could not affect it, "No matter what other women have done to you, or you to them, they have in no way walked in my garden." Harry Hanson, a New York critic, gave the book a positive review and called it inspiring, and that it was written with "rich understanding" and "deep pride". He recommended that the book should be read by white America. W. E. B. Du Bois placed it in the "must read" category in The Crisis, the NAACP magazine. Other views, however, were negative. Stark Young in the New Republic called it "biographical rubbish".

Eslanda played Adah in Borderline, an avant-garde classic silent film directed in 1930 by Kenneth MacPherson. Eslanda wrote in her diary of the experience: "Kenneth and H.D. used to make us so shriek with laughter with their naïve ideas of Negroes that Paul and I often completely ruined our makeup with tears of laughter, had to make up all over again."

=== Anthropologist ===
In 1931, the couple were living in London, England, and became more estranged. Eslanda resumed her own career, taking acting parts in three movies over the next couple of years. She enrolled at the London School of Economics for anthropology and graduated in 1937. In England, she learned more about Africa. She made the first of three journeys to the continent, touring South and East Africa with her son in 1936. With the signs of war imminent in Europe, the Robesons moved back to Harlem in 1938. Three years later, they moved to Enfield, Connecticut, to their estate "The Beeches". Eslanda earned her Ph.D. in anthropology at the Hartford Seminary in 1946. Using her diary notes of her Africa trip, she completed her second book, African Journey, the same year. The book was unusual, as few books in those days dealt with Africa in the first place, and her perspective, as an African-American woman, on women in black Africa was unique. The book's publication was endorsed by Pearl Buck, whose husband was the head of the John Day publishing house. The book argued that black people should take pride in their African heritage. Both white and black reviews were favorable.

Buck and Eslanda continued to work together. As a result, American Argument was published in 1949, a book of dialogues and comments, edited by Buck, that lets Eslanda speak on society, politics, gender role, and race relations. While the book contained a critique of Cold War politics, its reception, in general, was positive, but few copies were sold.

=== Cold War era ===
During the Cold War, the Robesons' lives changed dramatically. The couple had first visited the Soviet Union in 1934, were impressed by the apparent absence of racism, and agreed with the stance of communism against racism, colonization, and imperialism. While aware of the Great Purge by or before 1938, they accepted this (as Robeson explained to his son, "(S)ometimes... great injustices may be inflicted on the minority when the majority is in a pursuit of a great and just course") and did not speak out against it. By 1938, however, they helped Eslanda's brother Francis escape. Her brother John had already departed the previous year, and Paul Jr. did not continue with his education at a Moscow "model school".

In 1941, Eslanda and Paul joined other influential black people to found the Council on African Affairs. As a member, Eslanda spoke often and articulately in critique of Western colonial powers for subjugating people of color for political and economic gain.

The couple were targeted during McCarthyism. His passport revoked, Robeson's career came to a standstill, their income dropped dramatically, and the Connecticut estate had to be sold. On July 17, 1953, Eslanda, like her husband, was called to testify before the U.S. Senate. Asked if she was a communist, she took the Fifth Amendment and challenged the legitimacy of the proceedings. Her passport was revoked, until the decision was overturned in 1958. Fighting for the decolonization of Africa and Asia, she continued to work for the Council on African Affairs and to write as the UN correspondent for the New World Review, a pro-Soviet magazine.

Once their passports had been returned to the Robesons, they flew to London and the Soviet Union. Eslanda made her third and final trip to Africa, attending the first postcolonial All-African Peoples' Conference in Ghana in 1958. In 1963, she was diagnosed with breast cancer. She returned from Russia to the US and died in New York in 1965, two days before her 70th birthday.

== Publications ==
- Eslanda Goode Robeson: Paul Robeson, Negro. Harper Brothers, 1930
- Eslanda Goode Robeson: African Journey, John Day Co., 1945
- Pearl S. Buck with Eslanda Goode Robeson: American Argument, John Day Co., 1949

== Filmography ==
- Jericho (1937) (a.k.a. Dark Sands), as a Tribal princess
- Big Fella (1937), (uncredited)
- Borderline (1930), as Adah, a Negro Woman

== Awards and honors ==
- Clara Zetkin Medal (Clara-Zetkin-Medaille), GDR
