= Max Chapman (artist) =

English visual artist (1911–1999)

Max Balthazar Chapman (1911 – 1999) was an English visual artist. He was primarily a painter, but also made drawings, collages, and photographs.

Chapman attended Dulwich College, then the Byam Shaw Art School, 1927–30, where he was taught and befriended by Charles Ricketts. In 1931, Ricketts provided for Chapman to take "a scholarship to Italy and the European Grand Tour". He had his first solo exhibition at Storran Gallery, and then at Leger Gallery and Molton Gallery, all in London. Chapman was the long-time partner of writer Oswell Blakeston, with whom he collaborated on numerous books, for Arts Review and other publications.

According to his obituary in The Independent, Chapman "showed widely, ranging from the established Royal Academy, London Group and Leicester Galleries to the more experimental Grabowski, Molton and New Vision Centre galleries, and abroad".
