= Visa for Avalon =

1965 novel by Bryher

- First edition (publ. Harcourt Brace)
- Author: Bryher
- Language: English
- Publication date: 1965

Visa for Avalon is a 1965 novel by Bryher. It was re-released by Paris Press in 2004 with a new introduction by Susan McCabe.

== Plot summary ==
During a fishing vacation to Trelawney in an unidentified country, Mr. Robinson (his first name is never given) receives word that the Movement, a protest group with the tacit approval of the government, is planning a General Strike. Mr. Robinson's landlady, Mrs. Blunt, is given notice that the government is claiming her land as eminent domain. The pressures of mass industrialization and scattered reports of Movement activity lead Robinson, Blunt, Alex, Mr. Lawson, and Sheila Willis to seek refuge in the country of Avalon before the borders are closed for good. Avalon is not specifically identified in the story; only a glimpse is seen of white sandy beaches there at the book's end.
