= Sylvia Marlowe =

Sylvia Sapira (September 26, 1908 in New York City – December 11, 1981) was an American harpsichordist who performed and recorded under the name Sylvia Marlowe. She performed both the Baroque repertoire as well as contemporary compositions by composers such as Alan Hovhaness. Marlowe was the harpsichord soloist in the 1949 Fritz Reiner recording of Bach's Brandenburg Concerto No. 5, and can be seen and heard playing the Falla Harpsichord Concerto on Episode 4 of WNET's Music in the Twenties, with series presenter Aaron Copland conducting.

In 1957 she founded the Harpsichord Music Society, Inc. to promote new works for harpsichord and award scholarships for the advanced study of harpsichord and its repertoire. Composers commissioned by the society include Elliott Carter, Ned Rorem, Vittorio Rieti and Henri Sauguet.

== Sources ==
"Sylvia Marlowe (Harpsichord)". Bach-Cantatas.com.
