= Oswell Blakeston =

English writer, poet, filmmaker (1907–1985)

Blakeston in the 1930s.

Oswell Blakeston was the pseudonym of Henry Joseph Hasslacher (1907–1985), a British writer and artist who also worked in the film industry, made some experimental films, and wrote extensively on film theory. He was also a poet and wrote in non-fiction areas including travel, cooking and pets. His pseudonym combined a reference to the writer Osbert Sitwell with his mother's maiden name.

== Life ==
Blakeston was born to a family of Austrian origin. At age 16 he ran away, becoming a conjuror's assistant, a cinema organist and studio clapperboy.

Blakeston joined the staff of Close Up, the magazine of the Pool Group, in August 1927. While at Close Up, he very much became a protégé of Kenneth Macpherson, the publication's editor, and contributed more articles than any other single writer—a total of 84; he contributed to all but four of the journal's issues. While writing for Close Up, he worked in a variety of capacities in the British film industry and was for a time an assistant cameraman at Gaumont Studios.

In 1930, he made the short abstract film Light Rhythms with Francis Bruguière, long thought to be lost but which is now recovered.

He then edited the little magazine Seed with Herbert Jones, and wrote detective fiction with Roger Burford, under the pseudonym 'Simon'. From 1929, he also published novels and stories under the Blakeston name, producing 15 books of fiction, as well as 10 collections of poetry. The novels are wide-ranging, and include a number of works that mix gay themes with suspense and detective plots.

Blakeston was a contributor to John Gawsworth's anthologies, and a collaborator of M. P. Shiel. He also authored a number of travel books. According to the obituary of his partner Max Chapman, Blakeston achieved a number of firsts: his book Magic Aftermath (1932) was "the first fiction to be published in spiral binding" and his 1935 crime story The Cat with the Moustache (a collaboration with Burford) was "one of the first descriptions of trips with mescal". In his 1938 anthology Proems, Blakeston "published the first poems by Lawrence Durrell".

In the 1950s he was a contributor to ArtReview, then titled Art News and Review.

Blakeston's work was produced for small presses and specialty publishers and is no longer in print. The Harry Ransom Center at the University of Texas at Austin is home to an archive of Blakeston materials available to researchers.

Many of Blakeston's books are dedicated to his longtime partner, the artist Max Chapman, who also provided illustrations or photographs for a number of the volumes.

== Art ==
Blakeston was an artist with a "quick eye for the bizarre and the outrageous” according to Max Chapman. His art mixed abstract and expressionist imagery and tended to be small scale. Blakeston had over 40 solo shows, including in London at New Vision Centre, Drian and Grabowski galleries, and some 100 mixed shows at others such as the Leicester, Madden and Mercury galleries. In 1981 he shared an exhibition at Middlesbrough Art Gallery with Max Chapman and after his death, a memorial show was held in 1986 at Camden Arts Centre. Blakeston's work can be found in public collections including the Victoria & Albert Museum, Middlesbrough Institute of Modern Art and the Ulster Museum in Belfast, as well as national galleries in Finland, Poland and Portugal.

== Works ==
=== Films ===
- I Do Like to Be Beside the Seaside (1929)
- Light Rhythms (1930, with Francis Bruguière)

=== Fiction ===
==== Under the pseudonym "Simon", in collaboration with Roger Burford ====
- Murder Among Friends (1933)
- Death on the Swim (1934)
- The Cat with the Moustache (1935)
- The Mystery of the Hypnotic Room (1949)

==== Under the name Oswell Blakeston ====
- Extra Passenger (1929)
- Sluice Gates (c. 1930s)
- The Grim Case of Mrs. John (c. 1930s)
- Few Are Chosen (1931, with Francis Bruguière)
- Magic Aftermath (ca. 1932)
- Jim's Gun (1939, with Max Chapman)
- Danger in Provence (1946, with Max Chapman)
- Priests, Peters and Pussens (1947)
- Boys in Their Ruin (1949)
- Pink Ribbon, as Told to the Police (1950)
- Hop Thief (1959)
- The Night's Moves (1961)
- The Queen's Mate (1962)
- Fingers (1964)
- For Crying Out Shroud (1969)
- Ever Singing Die, Oh! Die (1970)
- Pass the Poison Separately (1976)

=== Poetry ===
- Poems, a Single Word! (ca. 1930)
- Death While Swimming (1932)
- Oswell Blakeston (1956)
- What the Dino-saur (1960)
- The Greatest Romantic Poem in the World (1963)
- How to Make Your Own Confetti (1965)
- The Furious Futures Dying (1967)
- Jeremy & Others (1971)
- Some Essential Information (1975)
- Journeys End in Young Man's Meeting (1979)

=== Cookbooks ===
- Edwardian Glamour Cooking Without Tears (1960)
- A Surprise in Every Dinner (1968)
- Cooking With Nuts (1979)

=== Travel ===
- Portuguese Panorama (1955)
- Isle of St. Helena (1957)
- Sun at Midnight (Finland) (1958)
- Thank You Now: an Exploration of Ulster (1960)

=== On Film and Photography ===
- Through a Yellow Glass (1928)
- Cruising with a Camera (1939, with F. W. Frerk)
- Phototips on Cats and Dogs (1938, with Edwin Smith)
- Working for the Films (1947) (editor)
- How to Script Amateur Films (1949)

=== Miscellaneous ===
- Working Cats (1963)
- Zoo Keeps Who? (1964)
