= Francis Bruguière =

American photographer

Francis Joseph Bruguière
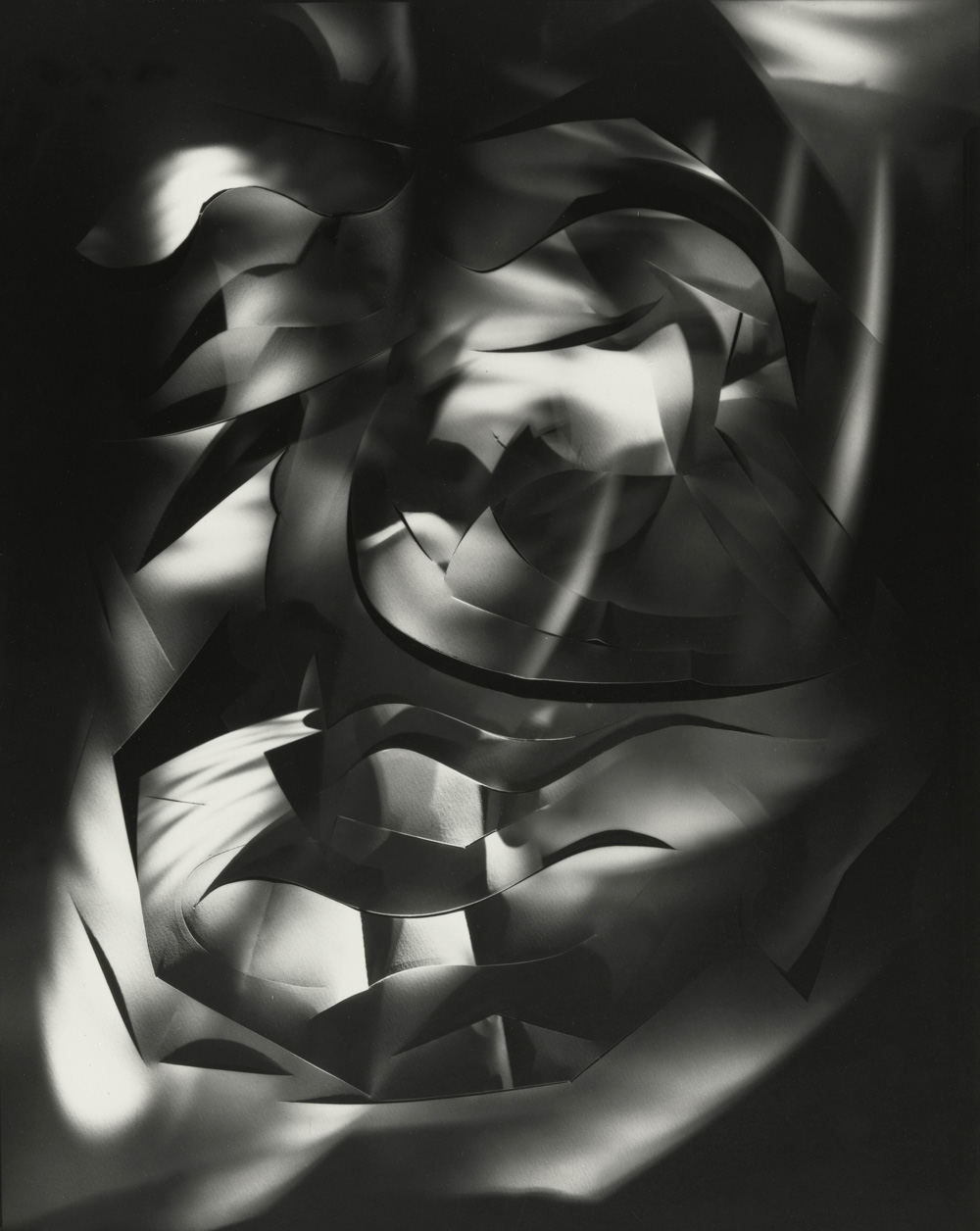
- Light Abstraction, 1925
- Born: 15 October 1879; San Francisco, California, US
- Died: 8 May 1945 (65); Middleton Cheney, England
- Occupations: Experimental photographer, painter and sculptor
- Partner: Rosalinde Fuller (actor 1892–1982)

Francis Joseph Bruguière (15 October 1879 – 8 May 1945) was an American photographer.

== Biography ==
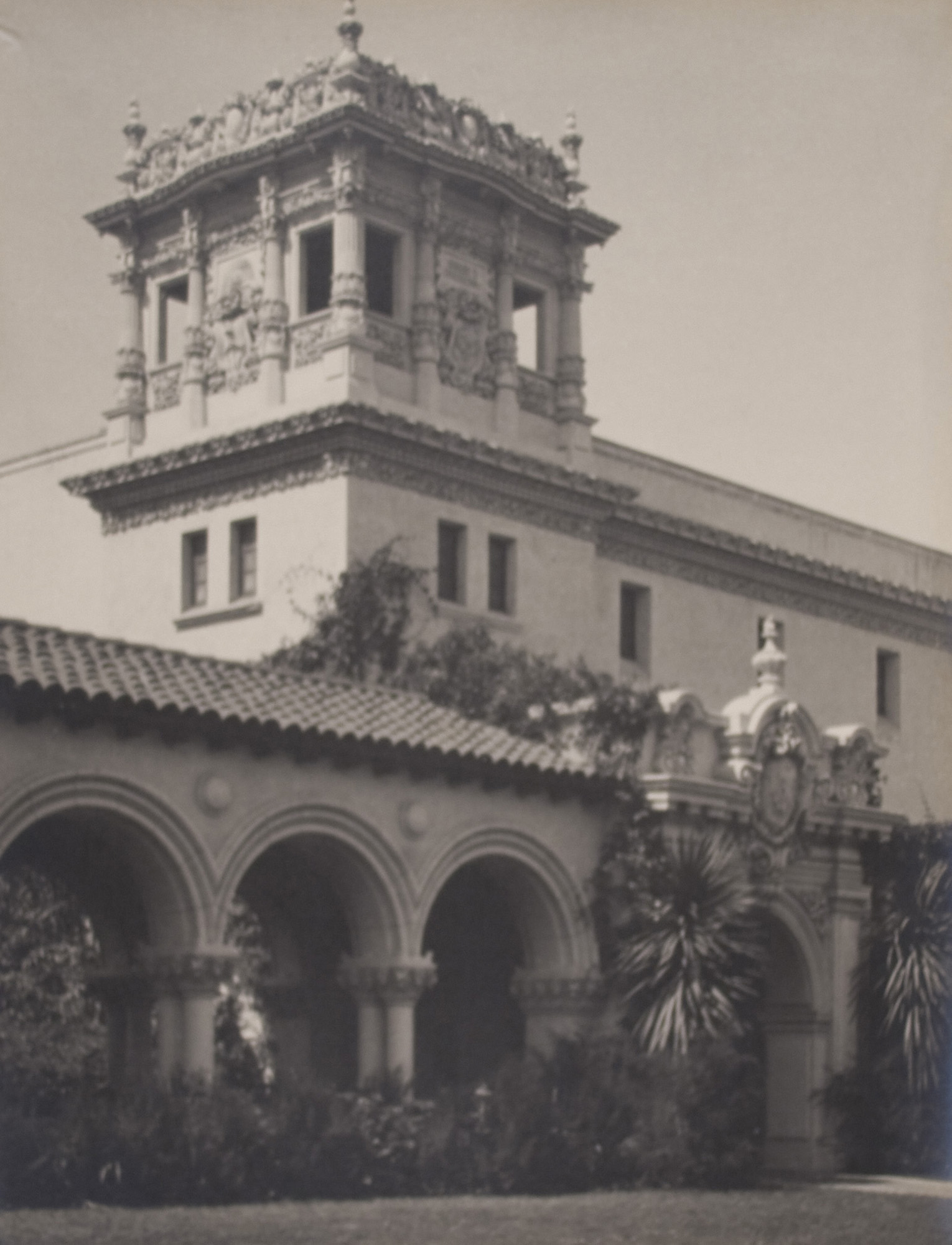
Colonade to Foreign Arts Building at the 1915 Panama–California Exposition, taken by Bruguière

Francis Bruguière was born in San Francisco, California, to Emile Antoine Bruguière (1849–1900) and Josephine Frederikke (Sather) Bruguière (1845–1915). He was the youngest of four sons born into a wealthy banking family and was privately educated. His brothers were painter and physician Peder Sather Bruguière (1874–1967), Emile Antoine Bruguiere Jr. (1877–1935), and Louis Sather Bruguière (1882–1954), who married wealthy heiress Margaret Post Van Alen. He was also a grandson of banker Peder Sather. His mother died in the 1915 sinking of the British ocean liner SS Arabic by a German submarine.

In 1905, having studied painting in Europe, Bruguière became acquainted with photographer and modern art promoter Alfred Stieglitz (who accepted him as a Fellow of the Photo-secession), and set up a studio in San Francisco, recording in a pictorialist style images of the city after the earthquake and fire; some of them were reproduced in a book called San Francisco in 1918. He co-curated the photographic exhibition at the 1915 Panama–California Exposition in San Diego, and nine of his photographs were included in The Evanescent City (1916) by George Sterling.

In 1918, following the decline of the family fortune, he moved to New York City where he made his living by photographing for Vanity Fair, Vogue, and Harper's Bazaar. Soon he was appointed the official photographer of the New York Theatre Guild. In this role he photographed the British stage actress Rosalinde Fuller, who was debuting in What's in a Name? (1920), and she partnered him for the rest of his life.

Throughout his life, Bruguière experimented with multiple-exposure, solarization (years ahead of Man Ray), original processes, abstracts, photograms, and the response of commercially available film to light of various wavelengths. Until his one-man show at the Art Centre of New York in 1927, he showed this work only to friends. In the mid-1920s, he planned to make a film called The Way, depicting stages in a man's life, to be played by Sebastian Droste with Rosalinde doing all the female parts. To obtain funding, Bruguière took photographs of projected scenes, but Droste died before filming started; so we are left with only the still pictures.

In 1927 they moved to London, where Bruguière co-created the first British abstract film, Light Rhythms, with Oswell Blakeston. Long thought to have been lost, it has now been recovered. In 1949 a memorial exhibition was held in the Focal Press gallery at 31 Fitzroy Square, London from 5 May to 3 June 1949. During World War II, he returned to painting.

== Other sources ==
- Enyeart, James (1977) Bruguière: His Photographs and His Life (New York: Alfred A. Knopf)
