= Pool Group =

British filmmaker trio

- Founded: 1927
- Founders: H.D.; Bryher; Kenneth Macpherson
- Type: Filmmakers’ collective
- Location: Territet, Switzerland

The Pool Group were a trio of filmmakers and poets consisting of H.D., Kenneth Macpherson, and Bryher (Annie Winifred Ellerman). Their work has been studied by poetry and film historians as well as by scholars of mysticism, feminism and psychoanalysis. The group produced four films of which Borderline is perhaps its best known, featuring the African American activist and entertainer Paul Robeson in the lead role. They also published a progressive and opinionated film journal called Close Up. The Pool Group were virtually forgotten for more than half a century after they broke up in the mid-1930s until the early 1980s when they were rediscovered by historians of 20th century arts and cinema.

== Members and formation ==
The Pool Group was launched in 1927, from Riant Chateau, Territet, Switzerland and consisted of Bryher, Kenneth Macpherson and Hilda Doolittle, better known by her initials, H.D. Macpherson designed the Pool Group's logo, which served as the cover of its catalog, showing concentric ripples in water.

=== Bryher ===
Bryher's father was the shipowner and financier John Ellerman, who left her a very large inheritance. It was Bryher who took care of the finances of the group. Bryher knew from an early age that she was lesbian. Her wealth enabled her to give financial support to struggling writers, including Joyce and Edith Sitwell. She also helped with finance for the Paris bookshop Shakespeare and Company (founded by Sylvia Beach) and certain publishing ventures. She also helped provide funds to purchase a flat in Paris for struggling artist Baroness Elsa von Freytag-Loringhoven.

=== H.D. ===
H.D. (1886–1961) was born Hilda Doolittle in Bethlehem, Pennsylvania. She was the daughter of a professor of astronomy and a musically inclined mother. While still a school-girl she met Ezra Pound, who encouraged her writing and, in 1913, proposed that she adopt the pseudonym H.D. as a pseudonym under which to publish her first poems in Poetry Magazine. At the same time as the problematic relationship with Pound (they were twice engaged) H.D. was carrying on a love affair with a Pennsylvania woman art student, Frances Josepha Gregg. In 1919 H.D. had a daughter, Perdita, by the Scottish composer and music critic Cecil Gray (1895–1951). It was while she was pregnant that she formed an alliance with Bryher which was to last until H.D.’s death in 1961. The relationship was an open one, with both taking other partners. In 1921 Bryher entered into a marriage of convenience with the American author Robert McAlmon, whom she divorced in 1927. In 1928, H.D. became pregnant by Kenneth Macpherson, but the pregnancy was terminated later the same year. The complexities of H.D.'s relationships led her to consult the pioneer sexologist Havelock Ellis and to develop a deep interest in psychoanalysis: in the 1930s, she was to be analyzed by Freud, and her interest deeply marked her poems and other writings.

=== Kenneth Macpherson ===
In 1927, Bryher married Kenneth Macpherson, a writer who shared her interest in film and who was at the same time H.D.'s lover. Macpherson, was a young Scottish painter with a passion for film. H.D. seems to have fallen in love with him though Macpherson was evidently exclusively homosexual. In Burier, Switzerland, overlooking Lake Geneva, the couple, along with Doolittle, built a Bauhaus-style structure that doubled as a home and film studio, which they named Kenwin. Bryher and Macpherson also formally adopted H.D.'s young daughter, Perdita, whose name they officially registered as Frances Perdita Macpherson.

== Close Up ==
Close Up was the Pool Group's main literary output, in the form of a monthly journal. The first issue of Close Up appeared in July 1927, with Macpherson as editor, Bryher as assistant editor, and H.D. and Oswell Blakeston as regular contributors.

The first issue announced that next month’s contributors would be Osbert Sitwell, Havelock Ellis, André Gide, Dorothy Richardson and Doolittle. As symbol of the group’s aims, this was explained in their 1929 catalog of publications:

. . . The expanding ripples from a stone dropped in a pool have become more a symbol for the growth of an idea than a simple matter of hydraulics.. .As the stone will cause a spread of ripples to the water's edge, so ideas once started will go to their unknown boundary. . . . These concentric expansions are exemplified in POOL, which is the source simply - the stone - the idea. POOL is seeking to express new trends and new will. Not, as we have said before, to grind any axe, but to make a centre for new ideas and modern thought.

== Publications ==
Other publications included books on film to novels and a German-teaching text by Bryher and Trude Weiss called “The Light-hearted Student”, exemplifying Bryher's idiosyncratic teaching methods. The Pool-books were: Kenneth MacPherson, Pool Reflection (spring 1927); F. L. Black, the pseudonym of Bryher's younger brother John Ellerman Jr.: Why Do They Like It?, with a foreword by Dorothy Richardson (spring 1927), on British public schools; Bryher: Civilians (fall 1927), on World War I; MacPherson's novel Gaunt Island (fall 1927); Oswell Blakeston: Through a Yellow Glass (1928), a complete guide to the cinema Studio; Eric Elliot: Anatomy of a Motion Picture Art (1929), history of cinematography; Bryher: Film Problems of Soviet Russia; Oswell Blakeston's novel: Extra Passenger (1930); Hanns Sachs: Does Capital Punishment Exist? (a pamphlet). Bryher's analyst from 1928 to 1932, Hanns Sachs (1881–1947) was one of the seven members of Freud's inner circle.

=== Oswell Blakeston ===
Most of the books were by the members of the group which had been expanded by the addition of Oswell Blakeston (né Henry Joseph Hasslacher, 1907–1985) who had started his working life in the cutting rooms at Gaumont British. A contemporary of David Lean, at around 20, Blakeston became a protégé of Macpherson and went on to a long career as writer and critic.

== POOL film-making ==
Pool heartily approved much avant-garde work, and had an early enthusiasm for independent and private film-making. Their principal loyalties however were to German cinema, and particularly G.W. Pabst, and to Soviet cinema, outstandingly Eisenstein. While dismissing the greater part of British and American film-making as "trash", they also recognized Hollywood's capacity for better things, hailing films like Greed and The Big Parade as masterpieces. The only extant film still available is Borderline (1930); fragments survive of Wing Beat (1927) and Foothills (1929). (H.D. was in all three, and Bryher was in Borderline.) 16mm fragments of Wing Beat, Foothills, and "Macpherson material," and the complete film, Borderline, can be viewed at the Museum of Modern Art Film Study Center in New York City.

=== Opinions on contemporary cinema ===
Kenneth Macpherson wrote of his views on world cinema in an editorial from the first issue of Close Up that encompassed many of the Pool Group's views,

But it was only a glimpse here and there. The Germanic thing was getting across though, curious details, watchfulness, harking on claustrophobia. We filed Germany for future reference and peeped at Vienna. Here again was tripe. Hollywood was better. Italy a shade worse. France tied up in knots on problems of continuity. While England trundled deplorably in wake, the only thing that could be said for it that it didn't seem to mind being a laughing stock. Then we began to hear from Russia. We had got very sick of Russian novels and Russian plays, and in spite of a recrudescence of Russian influence in art and decoration, there was prejudice. But Potemkin and Aelita put an end to that. Russia was getting its finger on something....Cinematography has stuck itself in front of the artist, and the artist wants to work his medium straight. His conflict is with the business manager. He also wants HIS medium straight. The thing one sees in consequence is compromise, and the beginning of a problem. As usual there are ways and means, which we will talk about later. I want first of all to cavil a bit in a general way and work in a bit of analysis and criticism.

— Scaramouche

== Borderline ==
The film Borderline centers on an interracial love triangle. The main narrative is concerned with racism and is illustrated without any attempt to take a moral standpoint. The film concentrated on the inner psychology of the characters, using a form of montage which had the effect of superimposition. Where the film was not banned by censorship authorities it was unenthusiastically received by the critics, and disappeared for many years. A pristine print exists however in the Swiss Film Archive, which has recently issued it in DVD form, together with Véronique Goel's documentary Kenwin, about the house which Bryher and Macpherson built at La Tour-de-Peilz.

As well as acting in this film, H.D. with Kenneth Macpherson, wrote an explanatory pamphlet to accompany it and to distribute to the audience, a piece later published in Close Up.Paul Robeson is the only professional actor in the film and his desire to connect to a like-minded set of individuals in Europe allegedly led him to play the role of Pete for no fee.

=== Borderline plot and analysis ===
The story revolves around a guesthouse run by a set of liberal, hedonistic young people sympathetic to the emerging black American culture. In what would have been completely frowned upon at the time, the manageress played by Bryher has given a room to Pete (Paul Robeson) and his light-skinned black wife Adah, played by Robeson's real wife at the time Eslanda Robeson. Adah though is having an affair with a white man Thorne (Gavin Arthur), who is also involved with Astrid, played by the poet H.D. When Adah leaves Thorne to be with her husband Pete, Thorne is distraught and race becomes an issue.

Increasingly Pete becomes the scapegoat for the heartache and conflict that follows between Thorne and Adah. When Thorne “accidentally” murders Astrid, the “liberal” Guest House is forced by the authorities to kick Pete out: “That’s what we’re like,” admits the sympathetic manager resignedly. To an extent, Robeson's character could be seen as reductionist in terms of identity, as he tends to be photographed in natural surroundings: sometimes with clouds and the sea as backdrops. The location set in a Swiss Alps border town is important in this respect. Likewise, Pete's behavior is stoical even in the most threatening situations. Yet on the other hand, this portrays the reality of culture in this period, and besides, Pete is also the character that comes out of the situation with the most dignity even when he is asked to leave town.

== Disbandment of POOL and legacy ==
Close Up ceased publication in 1933, and Macpherson departed from the group. In the United States during the 1940s, he lived with Peggy Guggenheim, and produced Hans Richter's Dreams That Money Can Buy (1944). During World War II, Bryher devoted her money and energies to helping refugees from Nazi Germany, and Kenwin became an important staging post on the flight.

During the 1950s, H.D. wrote a considerable amount of poetry, including Helen in Egypt, which she wrote between 1952 and 1954. Helen in Egypt is a feminist deconstruction of epic poetry which uses Euripides's play Helen as a starting point for a reinterpretation of the basis of the Trojan War and, by extension, of war itself. Bryher's friendship with H.D. lasted to the end of their lives. H.D. spent her last years of failing health in a Swiss clinic. She died on September 27, 1961, in Zurich. Her daughter Perdita moved to the United States, where she raised a family, all of whom became writers. Perdita died in 2001.
