= Close Up (magazine) =

Literary magazine (1927–1933)

Close Up was an influential literary magazine devoted to film, published by the Pool Group between 1927 and 1933. "It was the brain child of Kenneth Macpherson, a young man of independent means, not a little talent, and quite a lot of personal charm". The monthly magazine, founded at the group's 'headquarters' in Territet, Switzerland, would be dedicated to "independent cinema and cinema from around the world". The first issue was published in July 1927 and described itself on the front cover as an "international magazine devoted to film art". Macpherson was editor-in-chief, with Bryher as assistant editor, and Hilda Doolittle ("H.D.") and Oswell Blakeston making regular contributions.

The publication was truly international with correspondents reporting on productions worldwide, with major literary and cinematic figures contributing articles on the latest film theory (René Crevel, Dorothy Richardson, Sergei Eisenstein, Hanns Sachs, Harry Potamkin) and advertising revenue coming from Paris, Berlin, and New York.

Macpherson "dictated the tone and direction of the publication, contributing articles that defined the role of the director and defended the integrity of cinema and its right to be considered as art". Close Up would discard the vulgar entertainment films coming out of Britain and Hollywood, preferring the avant-garde productions from Germany and the Soviet Union. Blakeston, the most prolific of the magazine's writers, would mock British lack of imagination and general ineptitude. Editorial offices opened in 1928 at 24 Devonshire Street, and from April 1930 at 25 Litchfield Street, off Charing Cross Road, London, above Anton Zwemmer's bookshop and gallery.

The Academy cinema at 165 Oxford Street, which was dedicated to showing Continental and 'Unusual' art-house films, frequently advertised in its pages.

The magazine reduced in frequency from monthly to quarterly, eventually fizzling out in 1933 when Macpherson departed. A printed slip was attached to the flyleaf of the final December issue, requesting that in future all letters and orders should be addressed to Mr. A. Zwemmer, 87 Charing Cross Road. (Note: This is the address of Albany Mansion, a block of shops with chambers above, previously a bank. Zwemmer (and later his son Desmond) also owned a bookshop and gallery at 79 Charing Cross Road.)

== Publication details ==
- [Volume I], Nos. 1-6, July–December 1927
- Volume II, Nos. 1-6, January–June 1928
- Volume III, Nos. 1-6, July–December 1928
- Volume IV, Nos. 1-6, January–June 1929
- Volume V, Nos. 1-6, July–December 1929
- Volume VI, Nos. 1-6, January–June 1930
- Volume VII, Nos. 1-6, July–December 1930
- Volume VIII, Nos. 1-4, March, June, September & December 1931
- Volume IX, Nos. 1-4, March, June, September & December 1932
- Volume X, Nos. 1-4, March, June (p. 109), September (p. 227) & December (p. 309) 1933
