= Julien Levy =

American art dealer (1906–1981)

Julien Levy (1906–1981) was an art dealer and owner of Julien Levy Gallery in New York City, important as a venue for Surrealists, avant-garde artists, and American photographers in the 1930s and 1940s.

== Biography ==
Levy was born in New York on January 22, 1906. After studying museum administration at Harvard under Paul J. Sachs, Levy dropped out shortly before graduating, and moved to New York. There he met Marcel Duchamp. In 1926 he traveled to Paris with Duchamp, and befriended Man Ray and Berenice Abbott, through whom he came into possession of a portion of Eugène Atget's personal archive. In Paris in 1927, he also met artist and writer Mina Loy and was married to Loy's daughter, Joella Haweis.

The couple returned to New York, where Levy worked briefly at the Weyhe Gallery before establishing his own New York gallery at 602 Madison Avenue in 1931.

Levy and Haweis were divorced in 1942. In 1944, Julien Levy married again, to surrealist artist Muriel Streeter. His connections with many other artists during this period of the 1930s and 1940s allowed Streeter to gain helpful insight with her own work during this time spent in and around Levy's New York gallery.

In 1949, Levy moved to Connecticut, he was a friend to Arshile Gorky, and he married a third time, to Jean Farley McLaughlin in 1958. He wrote and taught at Sarah Lawrence College and State University of New York at Purchase. Levy's books include Memoir of an Art Gallery and Surrealism'.

Julien Levy died on February 10, 1981.

== Julien Levy Gallery ==
Concentrating at first on photography, he staged Man Ray's first major show, introduced Henri Cartier-Bresson to the US, and promoted many other European and American figures.

1932, January 29, landmark multi-media Surrealist exhibition, "Surrealism: Paintings, Drawings and Photographs" of the work of Pablo Picasso, Max Ernst, Joseph Cornell, Marcel Duchamp, and the introduction of Salvador Dalí's The Persistence of Memory (which Levy owned). He also championed the surrealist work of Leon Kelly. This exhibition marks the first in New York to display the works of members of the official surrealist group.

1933, November 21 - December 8, Salvador Dalí exhibition.

1934, April 3-19, Salvador Dalí drawings and etchings exhibition.

1934, October 1–13, Fifty Photographs by George Platt Lynes.

1934, October 22 - November 2, 8 Modes of Modern Painting.

1934, November 21 - December 10, Salvador Dalí exhibition.

1935, Julien Levy publishes Salvador Dalí's booklet Conquest of the Irrational.

1936, January 3–20, René Magritte exhibition.

1936, December 10 - January 9 1937, Salvador Dalí exhibition.

1937, the gallery moved to 15 East 57th Street.

1937, Julien Levy publishes Salvador Dalí's booklet, The Metamorphosis of Narcissus.

1937, October 6 - November 1, Dalí, Ernst, Berman, Tchelitchew, Leonid.

1938, January 4–18, Rene Magritte exhibition.

1938, November 1–15, the first solo exhibition of the work of Frida Kahlo.

1939, March 21- April 17, Salvador Dalí exhibition.

1941, April 22 - May 31, Salvador Dalí exhibition.

1943, the gallery moves to 42 East 57th Street.

1945, Arshile Gorky had his first solo show.

1947, Paul Delvaux had an exhibition of paintings, which was well received by critics.

The gallery closed in 1949.
