= Borderline (1930 film) =

1930 British film by Kenneth Macpherson

- Directed by: Kenneth Macpherson
- Written by: Kenneth Macpherson
- Produced by: The Pool Group
- Starring: Paul Robeson; Eslanda Robeson; Gavin Arthur; H.D.; (billed as Helga Doorn)
- Cinematography: Kenneth Macpherson
- Edited by: The Pool Group
- Release date: 1930
- Running time: 63 minutes
- Country: United Kingdom
- Language: Silent film with English intertitles

Borderline is a 1930 film, written and directed by Kenneth Macpherson and produced by the Pool Group in Territet, Switzerland. The silent film, with English title cards, is primarily noted for its handling of the contentious issue of interracial relationships, using avant-garde experimental film-making techniques.

The film, which features Paul Robeson, Eslanda Robeson, and H.D., was originally believed to have been lost, but was discovered, by chance, in Switzerland in 1983. An original 16mm copy of this film is now held in the Donnell Media Center, New York City Public Library.

In 2006, the British Film Institute sponsored the film's restoration by The George Eastman House and eventual DVD release with a soundtrack composed by Courtney Pine. Its premiere at the Tate Modern gallery in London attracted 2,000 people. In 2010, the film was released with a soundtrack composed by Mallory Johns, performed by the Southern Connecticut State University Creative Music Orchestra.

== Plot ==
Borderline (1930)

The film revolves around an interracial love triangle and its effects on the local townsfolk. The story is based in a guesthouse occupied by a pair of liberal, hedonistic young people sympathetic to the emerging black American culture. In what would have been frowned upon at the time, the manager has let out a room to a black couple, Pete and Adah.

Adah has an affair with Thorne, a white man, much to the dismay of the prejudiced townsfolk and Thorne's wife, Astrid. Pete attempts a reconciliation with Adah, but she eventually decides to leave him and the town. Astrid confronts Thorne about the affair and attacks him with a knife. In the scuffle, Astrid is killed. The film concludes with the aftermath of Thorne's trial for murder and the townsfolk's resolution of the issue.

== Cast ==
- Paul Robeson as Pete
- Eslanda Robeson as Adah
- Gavin Arthur as Thorne
- H.D. (billed as Helga Doorn) as Astrid
- Charlotte Arthur as The Barmaid
- Blanche Lewin as The Old Lady

== Cinematic techniques ==
Macpherson was particularly influenced by the cinematic techniques of G.W. Pabst and Sergei Eisenstein, whom he first met in 1929. In Borderline, he uses avant-garde, experimental film-making techniques, blending Eisenstein’s montage innovation and Pabst’s psycho-analytical approach, to identify the emotional and psychological states of the film’s characters. These techniques called for unconventional post-production editing, the use of light and shadow, and exaggerated movement on the part of the actors. "Macpherson’s brilliance lies in his ability to photograph small movements as nuanced, meaning-producing gestures".

== Reception ==
British film critic C. A. Lejeune wrote that "when a man like Macpherson directs a film like Borderline, towards an exclusively intelligent audience, there can be no question of give and take; the picture strives towards the renaissance ideal; it has a German-Russian approach with a keen knife-blade of indigenous intrepidity; it is something quite different from the multitude of experimental films made by non-professional groups all over the film seeing world; a challenge to public intelligence, an opportunity for everyone of us to declare himself, to test his honesty and his appreciation."

R. H. wrote in The Guardian "it is the cerebral implications which the director quite uncannily brings out; the psychological currents are the real action of the film; and he was excellently served, not only by his stars, but by the rather neurotic characters whose drama engulfs them; the old village at Lutry gave perfect exteriors." Jez Conolly opined "judged on its own merits, Borderline is a ground-breaking work, dealing as it does with issues of race and sexuality at a time when such subject matter was still largely taboo and had only been previously tackled cinematically through oblique inference".

In his review of the DVD, Martin Stollery opined that "contemporary critics have commented on how Borderline celebrates Paul Robeson, or at least his body, as more soulful, vital and grounded than the white characters around him; yet the film also deactivates Robeson within the narrative and presents him as in some respects less sophisticated than his white counterparts. Courtney Pine's score, with its recurrent bass notes for Robeson and more jarring, synthesised motifs for the white characters, makes this aspect of the film audible."

Jean Walton observed that "critical attention to Borderline has been diverse, characterizing the film in each of the following discrete manners: as a feminist production, modernist expression, psychoanalytic experiment, lesbian or queer text, white representation of blackness, and a significant moment in Paul Robeson's film career; but in almost every case, emphasis on one aspect of the film's importance inevitably results in the bracketing of its other dimensions, with little attention paid to their interdependency."

== Film and legacy details ==
For many years, Borderline was largely inaccessible to film scholars, with rare copies in a few archives around the world. It was seldom screened in public. Many film historians of avant garde and experimental film-making, feel that it represents one of the last examples of modernism of the 1920s, when many artists had hoped that artistic experimentation and commercial viability need not be mutually exclusive. An anonymous libretto, 'The Borderline Pamphlet', credited to H.D., was written to accompany – and explain – the film.
