= Muriel Streeter =

American artist

- Born: 1913; Vineland, New Jersey, U.S.
- Died: 1995 (aged 81–82); Tucson, Arizona, U.S.
- Occupation: Artist

Muriel Streeter (1913–1995) was an American artist known for her surrealist and neo-romantic paintings. Her work is included in the collections of the Smithsonian American Art Museum, the Wadsworth Atheneum Museum of Art, and The Philadelphia Museum of Art, where her archives are also held.
