= Bryher (novelist) =

English novelist and writer (1894–1983)

- Born: 2 September 1894; Margate, Kent, England
- Died: 28 January 1983 (aged 88); Vevey, Switzerland
- Resting place: Saint Martin's Cemetery, Vevey, Switzerland
- Occupation: Novelist

Annie Winifred Ellerman (2 September 1894 – 28 January 1983), known by the pen name Bryher, was an English novelist, poet, memoirist, magazine editor, and a member of the Ellerman ship-owning family.

She was a major figure of the international set in Paris in the 1920s, using her fortune to help many struggling writers. With her lover H.D. and the Scottish writer Kenneth Macpherson, she launched the film magazine Close Up, which introduced Sergei Eisenstein’s work to British viewers. From her home in Switzerland, she helped to evacuate Jews from Nazi Germany, and then became an historical novelist.

== Early life ==
Bryher was born in September 1894 in Margate. Her father was the shipowner and financier John Ellerman, who at the time of his death in 1933 was the richest Englishman who had ever lived. He lived with her mother Hannah Glover, but did not marry her until 1908.

Bryher traveled in Europe as a child, to France, Italy, Egypt, Spain, Germany, Switzerland, North Africa and Greece. At the age of fourteen she was enrolled at Queenwood Ladies' College and at around this time her mother and father married. On one of her travels, Ellerman journeyed to the Isles of Scilly off the southwestern coast of Great Britain and acquired her future pseudonym from her favourite island, Bryher.

During the 1920s, Bryher was an unconventional figure in Paris. Among her circle of friends were Ernest Hemingway, James Joyce, Gertrude Stein, Sylvia Beach and Berenice Abbott. Her wealth enabled her to give financial support to struggling writers, including Joyce and Edith Sitwell. She also helped with finance for Sylvia Beach's bookshop Shakespeare and Company and certain publishing ventures, and started a film company Pool Group. She also helped provide funds to purchase a flat in Paris for the destitute Dada artist and writer Baroness Elsa von Freytag-Loringhoven. As well, Berenice Abbott, who was working for Man Ray during the 1920s, wished to own her own camera rather than relying on Ray's, so Bryher purchased and gifted Abbott a camera.

== Relationship and later life ==
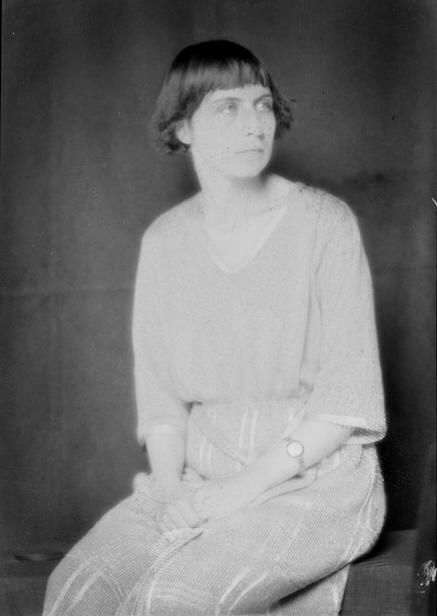
Bryher photographed in 1923 by Man Ray

Bryher knew from an early age that she was lesbian. In 1918 she met and became involved in a relationship with American poet Hilda Doolittle, better known by her initials, H.D. The relationship was open, and both had other partners. In 1921 she entered into a marriage of convenience with the American author Robert McAlmon, whom she divorced in 1927.

That same year she married Kenneth Macpherson, a writer who shared her interest in film and who was at the same time H.D.'s lover. In Burier, Switzerland, overlooking Lake Geneva, the couple built a Bauhaus-style structure that doubled as a home and film studio, which they named Kenwin. They formally adopted H.D.'s young daughter, Perdita. In 1928, H.D. became pregnant with Macpherson's child, but chose to abort the pregnancy. Bryher divorced MacPherson in 1947; she and Doolittle no longer lived together after 1946, but continued their relationship until Doolittle's death in 1961.

== Filmmaking and film criticism ==
Bryher, H.D., and Macpherson formed the film magazine Close Up, and the Pool Group. Only one POOL film, Borderline (1930), starring H.D. and Paul Robeson, survives in its entirety. In common with the Borderline novellas, it explores extreme psychic states and their relationship to surface reality. Bryher herself plays an innkeeper.

Bryher's most notable non-fiction work was Film Problems of Soviet Russia (1929). In Close Up she compared Hollywood cinema unfavorably with Soviet cinema, arguing that the studio system had "lowered the standards" of cinema. Her writings also helped to bring Sergei Eisenstein to the attention of the British public.

== World War II and after ==
In a 1933 article in Close up entitled "What Shall You Do in the War?", Bryher wrote about the situation of Jews in Nazi Germany, urging readers to take action. Starting that year, her home in Switzerland became a "receiving station" for refugees; she helped more than 100 people escape Nazi persecution before she began to fear for her own safety and returned to the UK. This experience influenced her 1965 science fantasy novel Visa for Avalon, about a group of people trying to escape an unnamed country for a place called Avalon on the eve of revolution.

From 1940 to 1946 she lived in London with H.D. and supervised the literary magazine Life and Letters To-day. She later wrote a memoir of these years entitled The Days of Mars, as well as a novel, Beowulf (1948), set during the Blitz.

Starting in 1952, she wrote a series of historical novels. Most are set in Britain during various eras; Roman Wall (1954) and The Coin of Carthage (1963) are set in the Roman Empire; Ruan (1960) is set in a post-Arthurian Britain. They are well researched and vivid, typically set in times of turmoil and often seen from the perspective of a young man. The Fourteenth of October (1952) focuses on a young boy, Wulf, caught up in the Battle of Hastings. The Player's Boy (1953) is centred on James Sands, a youthful apprentice actor in the Elizabethan theatre. Ruan portrays the adventures of a Druid Novice who yearns to escape the confines of his surroundings and upbringing to become a sea captain. Rosemary Sutcliff, who admired Bryher's work, reprinted The Player's Boy in her series, the "Hodder and Stoughton Library of Great Historical Novels".

Acclaimed in her own time, her historical novels have now fallen out of print, but used copies are readily available. Since 2000, Visa for Avalon, her early semi-autobiographical novels Development and Two Selves, her memoir The Heart to Artemis, and her historical novel The Player's Boy have been republished.

== Selected works ==
=== Poetry ===
- Region of Lutany (1914)
- Arrow Music (1922)

=== Novels ===
- Development (1920)
- Two Selves (1923)
- West (1925)
- Civilians (1927)
- Manchester (serialised, 1935–1936)
- Beowulf (1948)
- The Fourteenth of October (1952)
- The Player's Boy (1953)
- Roman Wall (1954)
- Gate to the Sea (1958)
- Ruan (1960)
- The Coin of Carthage (1963)
- Visa for Avalon (1965)
- This January Tale (1966)
- The Colors of Vaud (1969)

=== Nonfiction ===
- Amy Lowell: A Critical Appreciation (1918)
- A Picture Geography for Little Children: Part One – Asia (1925)
- Film Problems of Soviet Russia (1929)
- The Light-hearted Student: I German (1930 – grammar text)
- The Heart to Artemis: a Writer's Memoirs (1963)
- The Days of Mars: a Memoir, 1940–1946 (1972)
