= Jean-François-Timothée Trullet =

Jean-François-Timothée Trullet (15 April 1755 in Saint Tropez – 27 May 1819 in Toulon) was a French Navy officer.

== Biography ==
Born to a family of sailors, and elder brother of Louis-Léonce Trullet, Jean-François-Timothée Trullet joined the Navy as a cabin boy in 1770, before sailing on a merchantman captained by his father.

He was appointed commerce captain in 1777. In 1779, he joined the French Royal Navy as an auxiliary ensign and served off Arabia

By 1792, Trullet had risen to ensign and served on Tonnant. Promoted to lieutenant in July, he took command of an aviso. From February 1793, he served on the Heureux.

In May 1795, Trullet received a temporary promotion to captain and was appointed second captain on Victoire. In May 1795, he obtained command of the Duquesne.

In 1798, Trullet was appointed to the 74-gun Guerrier, on which he took part in the Battle of the Nile. His ship hopelessly damaged, he ordered the colours struck, and was taken prisoner. Guerrier was set on fire after the battle as she was damaged beyond repairs.

Released on parole in November, Trullet served ashore until he was given command of the Formidable in 1803. He transferred to Annibal in 1805.

Troude retired in 1810.

== Honours ==
- Legion of Honour.

== Sources and references ==
- Saint Tropez, porte de l'Orient. Les frères Trullet, vie et destin de deux marins tropéziens., by Guy Rachet. Rocher, ISBN 978-2-268-03610-6 (fictitious memoirs)
- Dictionnaire des capitaines de vaisseau de Napoléon, Danielle & Bernard Quintin, SPM, 2003, ISBN 2-901952-42-9
