= French brig Foudre =

Brig-rigged aviso

Foudre
History

France
- Name: Foudre
- Namesake: Lightning
- Builder: Toulon dockyard
- Laid down: 1795
- Launched: 1796

Great Britain
- Name: HMS Foudre
- Acquired: March 1799 by capture
- Captured: April 1799

France
- Name: Foudre
- Acquired: April 1799 by capture
- Captured: 1800

Great Britain
- Name: HMS Foudre
- Acquired: 1800 by capture
- Fate: Sold 1801

General characteristics
- Tons burthen: 192 (bm)
- Complement: French service:52 at capture
- Armament: French service: Originally: 6 × 4-pounder guns (pierced for 8); At capture: 8 guns; British service: 8 guns

Foudre was a brig-rigged aviso that the French Navy launched in 1796. The Royal Navy captured her in March 1799, only to have the French recapture her the next month. The British recaptured her in 1800, returned her to service, but sold her in 1801.

== French career ==
Between 28 August 1794 and 11 December, Foudre was under the command of lieutenant de vaisseau non entretenu Lambert, and escorting a convoy from Saint-Malo to Saint-Valery-sur-Somme. From there between 14 January 1795 and 14 June, she escorted convoys between Cherbourg and Boulogne, before returning to Havre. Around April 1796 she escorted a convoy from Dieppe to Saint-Valery-sur-Somme.

== Capture ==
Foudre was one of a flotilla of seven vessels that Commodore Sir Sidney Smith in HMS Tigre took at Acre on 18 March 1799, all of which the British took into service. At capture Foudre carried six guns and had a crew of 52 men.

The flotilla of gun-vessels was carrying siege artillery and other siege supplies to reinforce Napoleon's troops besieging Acre. Smith immediately put the guns and supplies to use to help the denizens of the city resist the French, and the gun-vessels to harass them.

Smith anchored Tigre and HMS Theseus, one on each side of the town, so their broadsides could assist the defence. The gun-vessels were of shallower draft and so could come in closer. Together, they helped repel repeated French assaults. The French attacked multiple times between 19 March and 10 May before Napoleon finally gave up. On 21 May he destroyed his siege train and retreated back to Egypt, having lost 2,200 men dead, 1,000 of them to the plague.

== Recapture ==
However, on 9 April, the French frigate Courageuse recaptured Foudre and the French navy took her back into service.

== Re-recapture ==
Then in 1800 the Royal Navy recaptured her and returned her to service as HMS Foudre. She was sold in 1801.
