= Guy Rachet =

French egyptologist, novelist (born 1930)

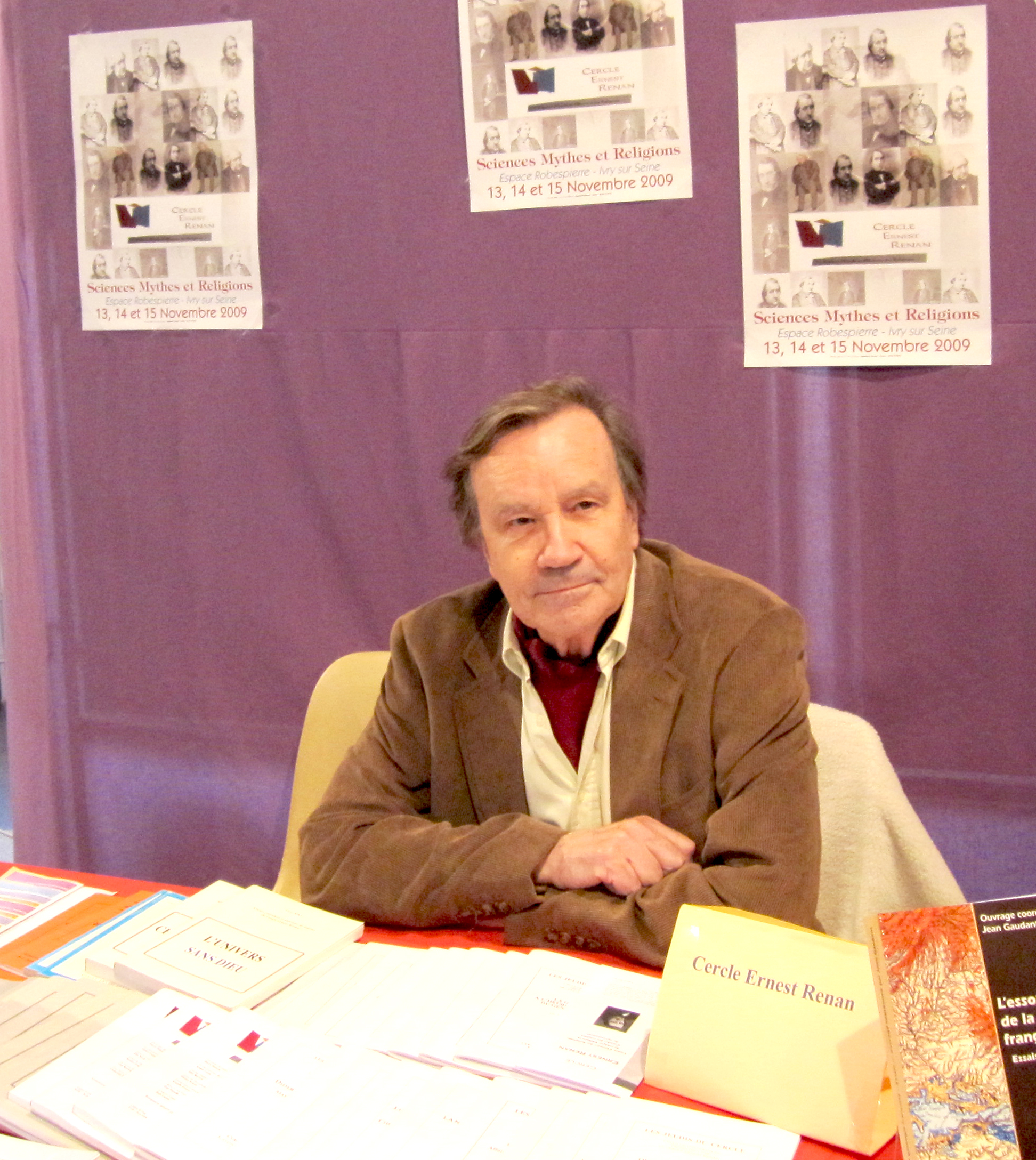
- Born: 27 December 1930; Narbonne
- Education: École des Roches
- Occupations: Writer, archaeologist, historian, novelist
- Relatives: Sylvie Simon

Guy Rachet (born December 27, 1930, in Narbonne) is a French egyptologist historian, archaeologist, novelist and president of the Cercle Ernest Renan. Rachet is the author of numerous works on ancient civilizations in general and Egyptian civilization in particular.

== Life ==
At the age of 18 Rachet enlisted in the army after his father's suicide. Upon his return, and being stripped of his inheritance due to family disputes, he began to work at whatever he could find until he got a job at the U.S. embassy in Paris.

In the early 1960s, Rachet, who had no formal qualifications, used the knowledge he had acquired over 20 years to approach a number of archaeological luminaries such as Abbé Breuil, and even to direct the archaeological excavations at the Gallo-Roman villa of La Pépinière2 near Villiers-le-Duc (Côte-d'Or). There, he met a budding 17-year-old archaeologist, Marie-Françoise, and fell in love with her. The couple married a few months later, in 1961, and together they had eight children.

The couple wrote several specialized works, such as L'Archéologie de la Grèce préhistorique and Le Dictionnaire de la Civilisation grecque, which were published by Marabout and Larousse. Until the early 1980s, the couple and their children lived frugally on the little money they earned from their scientific books, managing to make very long journeys by van to all the countries of the Mediterranean, and in particular to the Middle East, where Guy Rachet met the famous archaeologist André Parrot at the site of Mari, in Syria.

== Success and recognition ==
In 1979, Guy Rachet published his first novel, Massada, les Guerriers de Dieu, with Lattès, but it met with little success. It wasn't until the following year that the writer finally made a name for himself with Les Vergers d'Osiris, a historical novel set in ancient Egypt, written in 1967, which the young publisher Olivier Orban agreed to publish. In 1981, the book won the RTL Grand Public prize and became a best-seller, selling over 250,000 copies, with a sequel published the following year, Vers le Bel Occident.

While continuing to write a number of popular archaeological works, Guy Rachet also began writing historical novels on a regular basis.

Based in Paris, Guy Rachet is now an author and archaeologist considered a specialist in Egypt, a country to which he has dedicated several works and to which he has travelled on several occasions.

Since 2008, Guy Rachet has been vice-president of the Cercle Ernest Renan, a center for the history of religions, biblical criticism and research into the origins of Christianity. At the 2008 general meeting, he was elected president of the center.

== Award ==
- Grand prix RTL-Lire.
