= French frigate Hermione (2014) =

Frigate reproduction in France

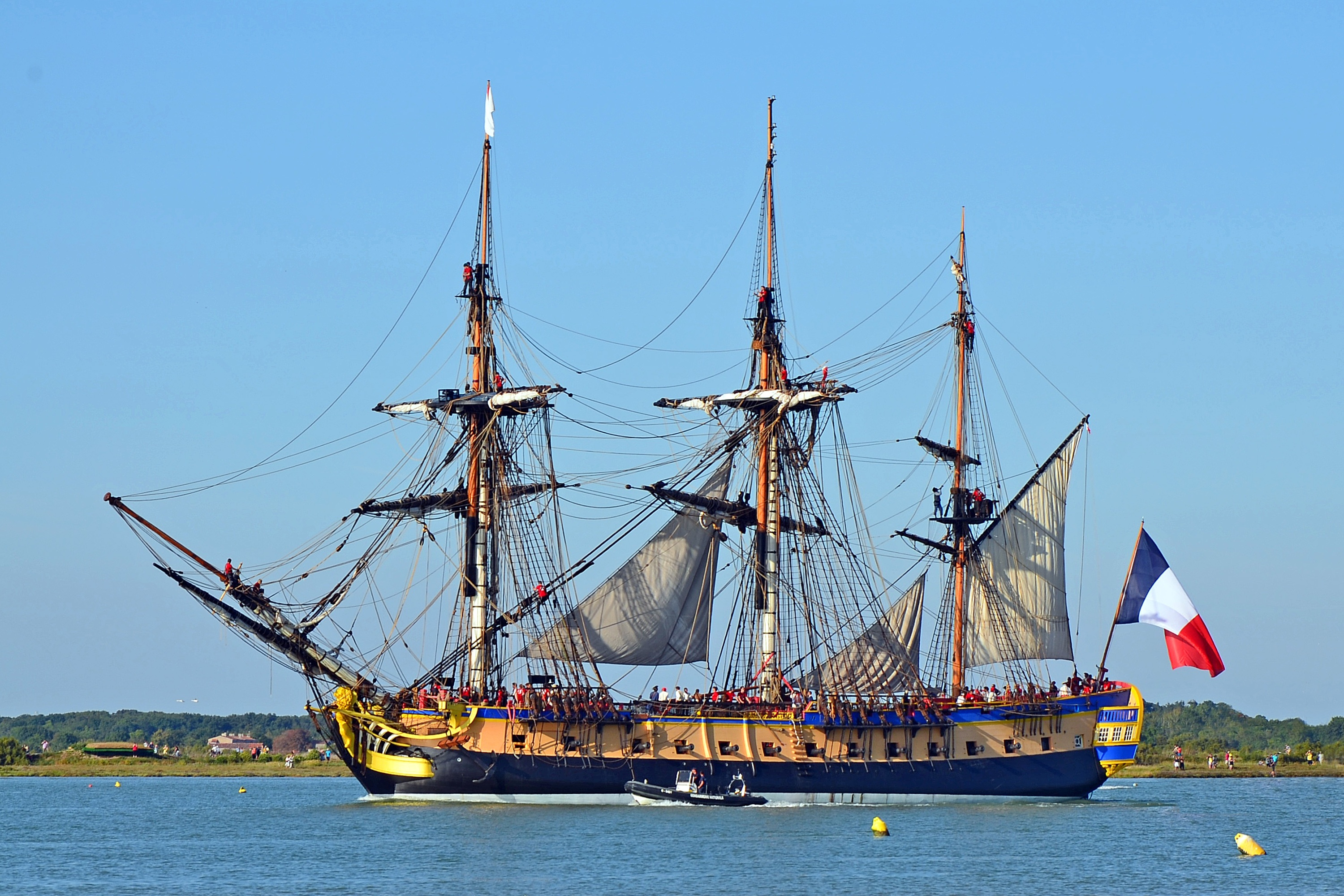
- On 17 September 2014, the replica Hermione arrives at the mouth of the Charente River and reaches open sea for the first time.

History

France
- Name: Hermione
- Ordered: 1995
- Builder: Asselin at Rochefort
- Laid down: 1997
- Launched: 6 July 2012

General characteristics
- Class & type: Concorde-class 12-pounder frigate
- Displacement: 1,166 tons
- Length: 65 m (213 ft 3 in)
- Beam: 11.24 m (36 ft 11 in)
- Height: 54 m (177 ft 2 in)
- Draught: 5.78 m (19 ft 0 in)
- Propulsion: Sails, auxiliary engine
- Sail plan: full-rigged ship
- Complement: 72
- Armament: 32 (non-functional replica) guns: 26 × 12-pounder long guns main battery; 6 × 6-pounder guns on the galliards

Hermione (French pronunciation: [ɛʁmjɔn]) is a 32-gun Concorde-class frigate fitted for 12-pounder guns, completed at Rochefort by the Asselin organisation in 2014. It is a reproduction of the 1779 Hermione, which achieved fame by ferrying General La Fayette to the United States in 1780 to allow him to rejoin the American side in the American Revolutionary War.

== Construction ==
This project was conceived by members of the Centre International de la Mer in 1992, and construction began in 1997, envisaging a launch in April 2015 (as compared to the original, which took less than a year to build). The shipyard was in one of the two dry docks beside the Corderie Royale at Rochefort. As far as possible, traditional construction methods were used although modern power tools were substituted for the period tools on some jobs. The site is open to the public, and admission fees help fund the project.

Plans of a sister ship, Concorde, were used. The cost was estimated to be $22 million. The original plans had been modified in several ways for reasons of strength and safety: planks had been bolted rather than pegged to avoid movement during the long period of construction. Similarly, the mast sections were fastened with glue rather than metal hoops to avoid water penetration. The cannons are lightweight and non-functional to save weight. Manilla rope has been used for the majority of the rigging and the sails made of linen canvas. An engine will be used for safety, and electric generators for lighting and basic amenities.

== 2015 voyage ==
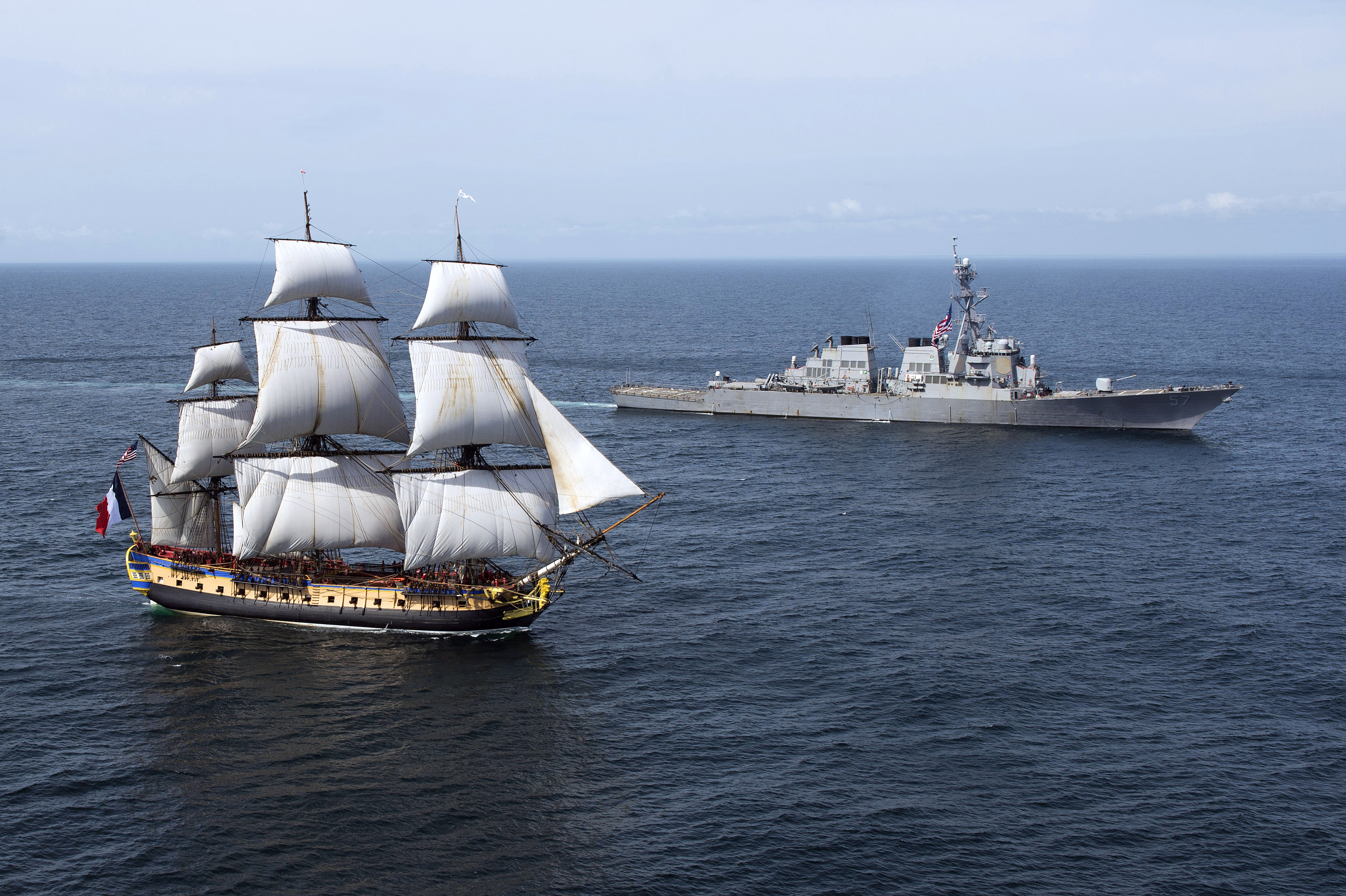
Hermione welcomed in US waters by USS Mitscher

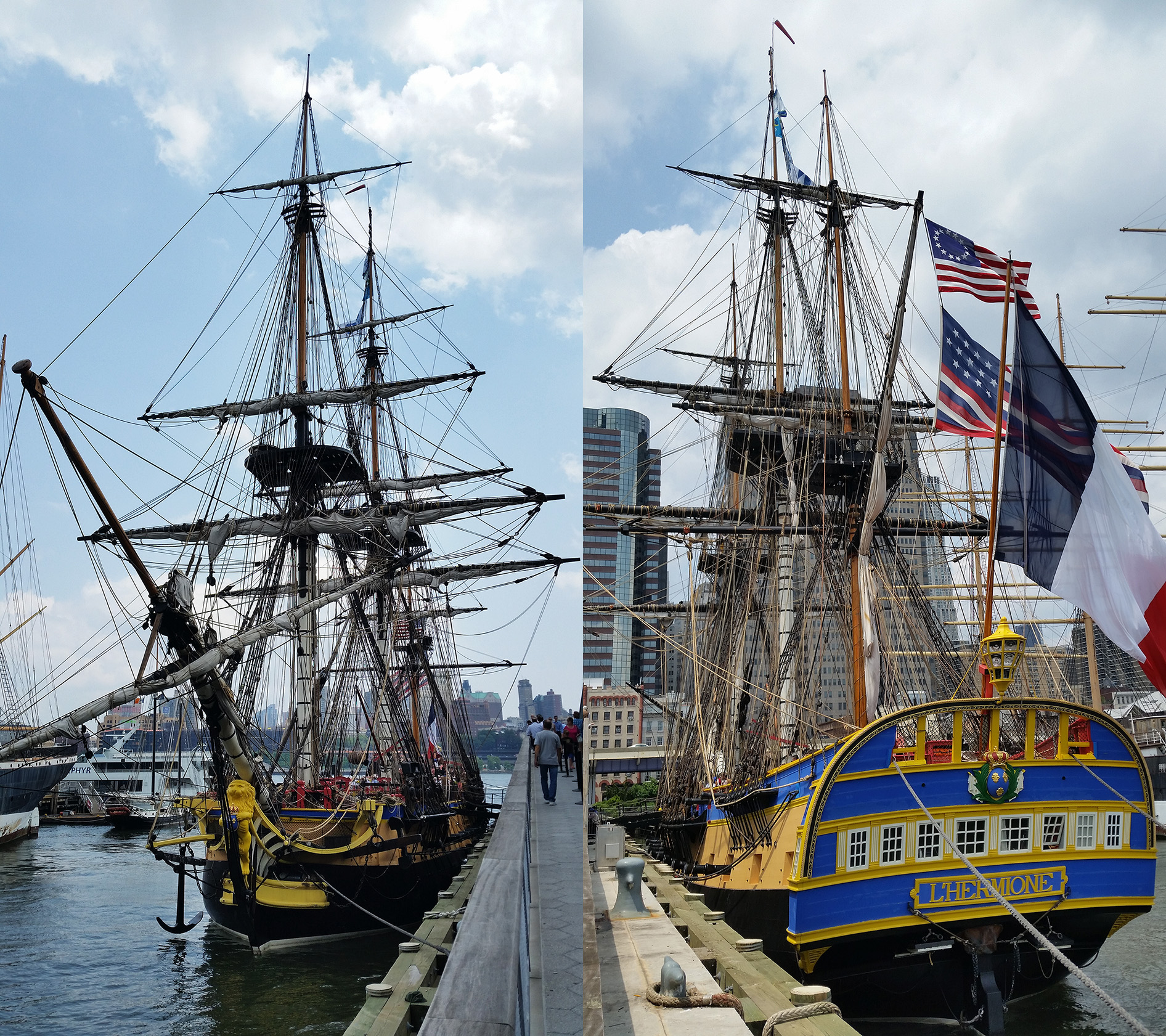
French replica light frigate Hermione at New York South Street Seaport Pier 15, 1 July 2015

In preparation for a transatlantic voyage in 2015, the frigate departed from Rochefort and started her seaworthiness trials on 7 September 2014. In April 2015, Hermione started her return voyage to the United States. Hermione's itinerary is meant to reaffirm the relationship between the United States and France. Hermione departed from La Rochelle on 18 April 2015.

== 2018 voyage ==
On 2 February 2018, Hermione undertook another voyage leaving Rochefort for the Mediterranean with 11 stopovers including Tangier, Sète, Marseille and Toulon.

== 2021 damage ==
During an inspection in 2021, extensive damage due to rot was found in Hermione's planking and timbers. Repairing the damage will require an essentially complete rebuild (something not uncommon in the days of wooden warships), which is hoped to be completed in 2025.

== Gallery ==
Photographs of the construction from 2005.

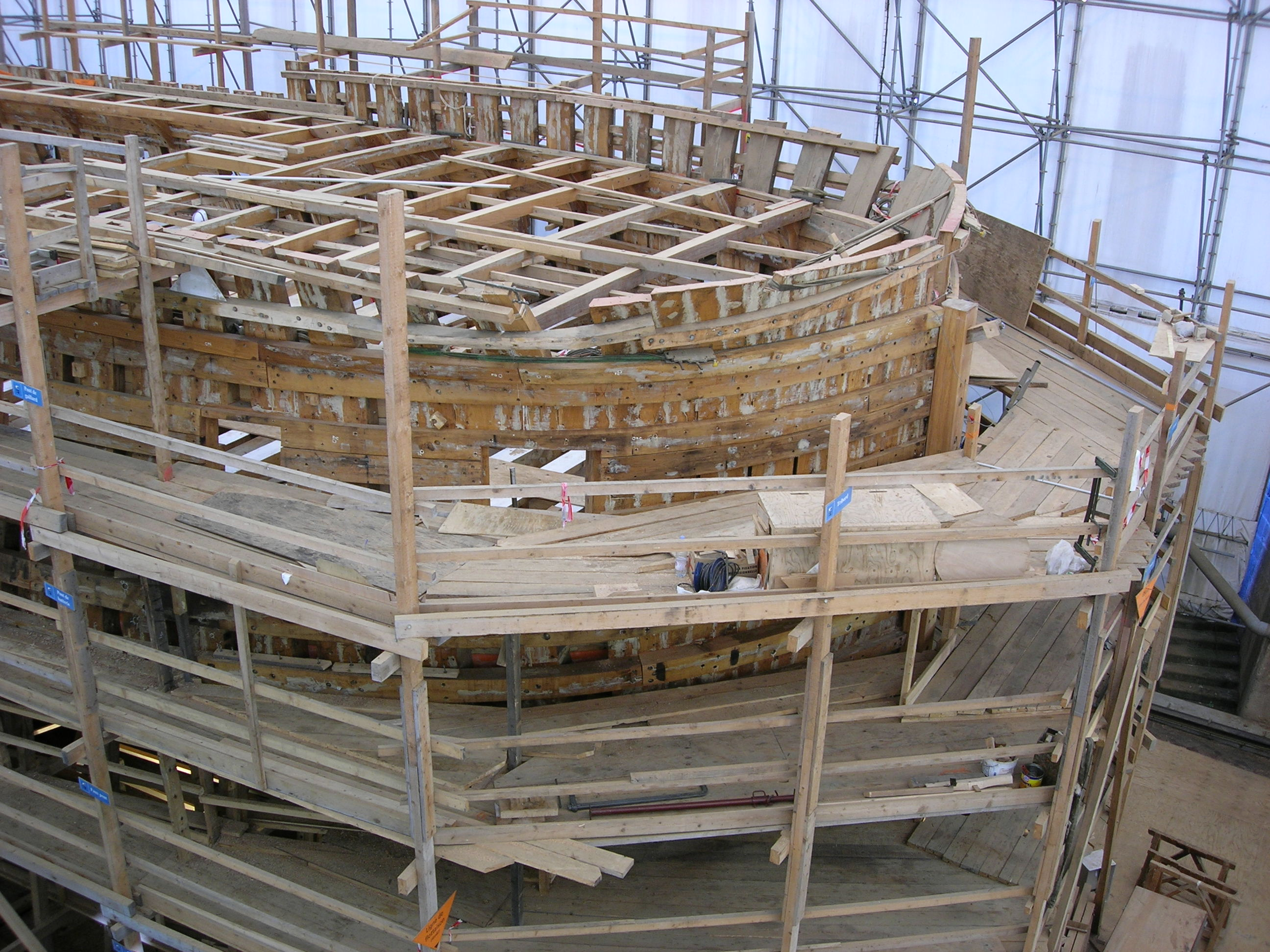

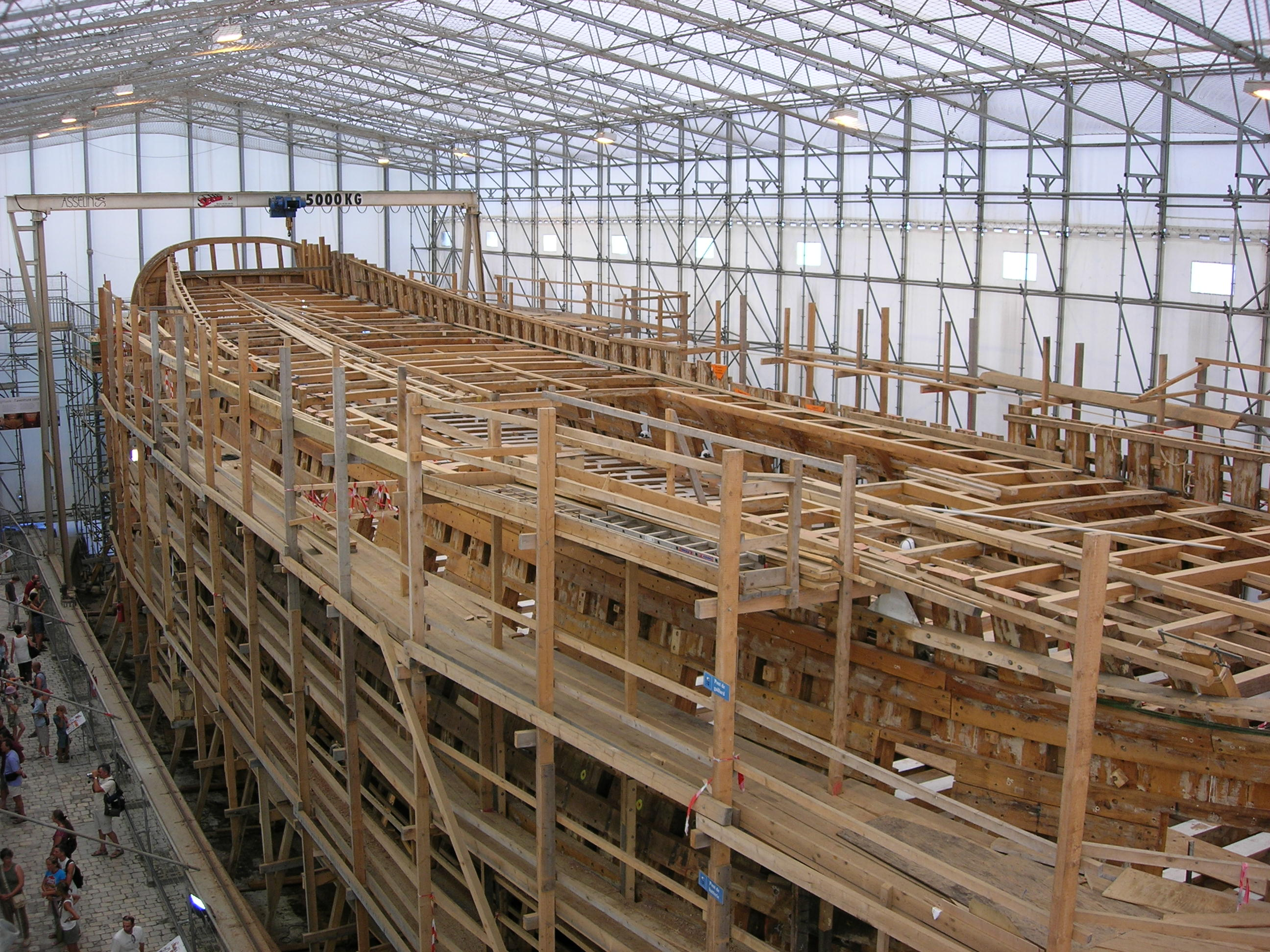

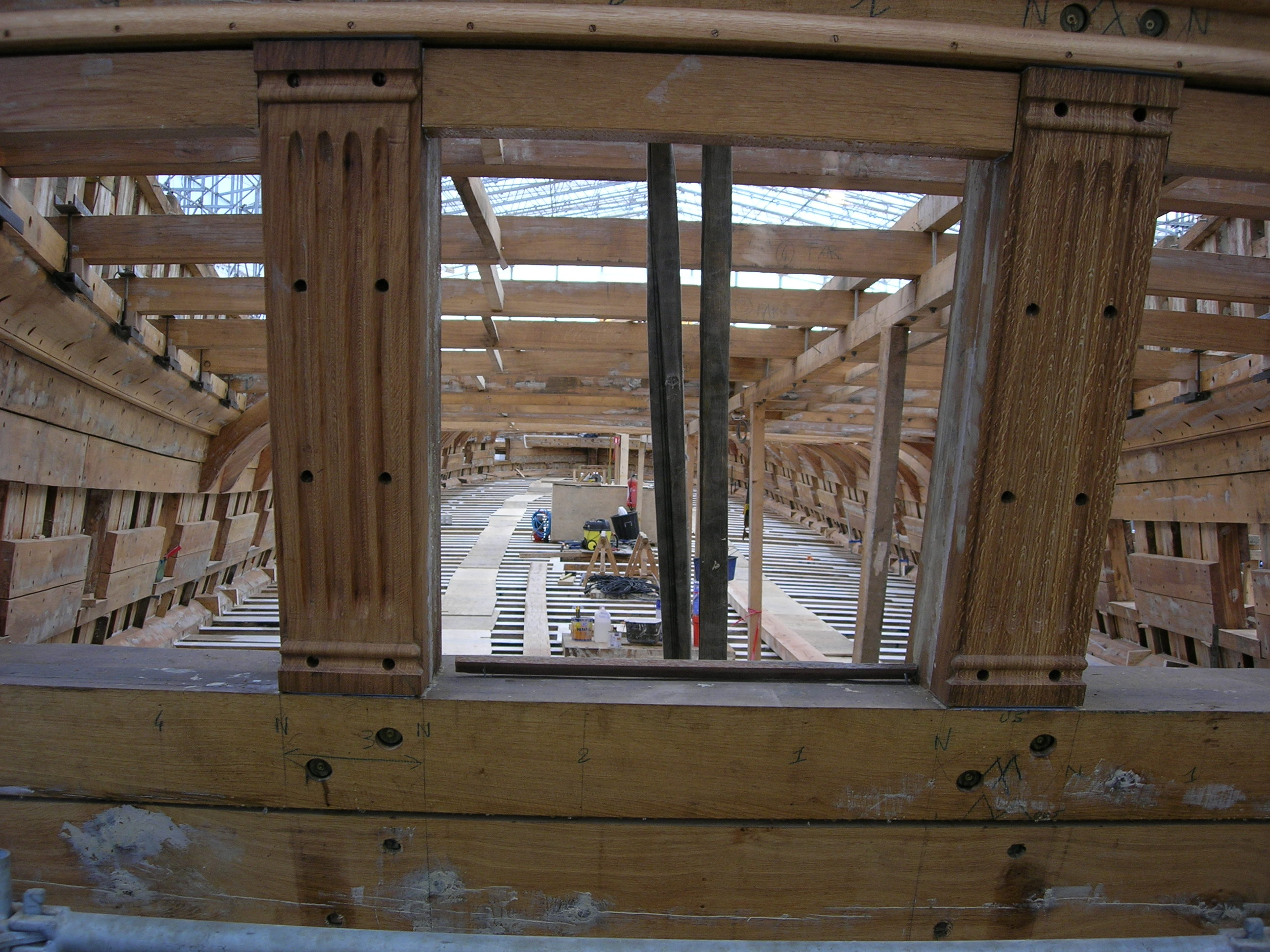

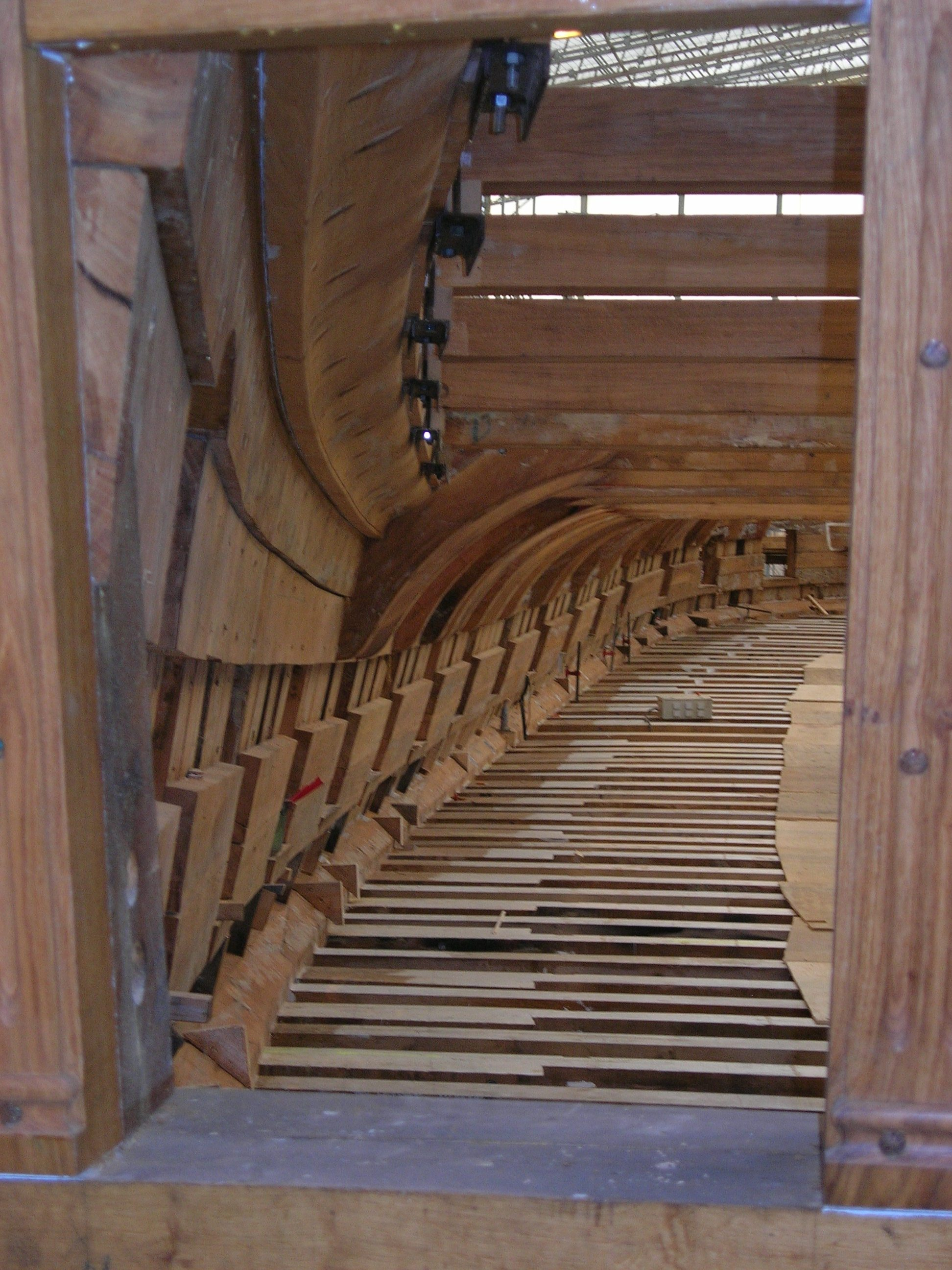

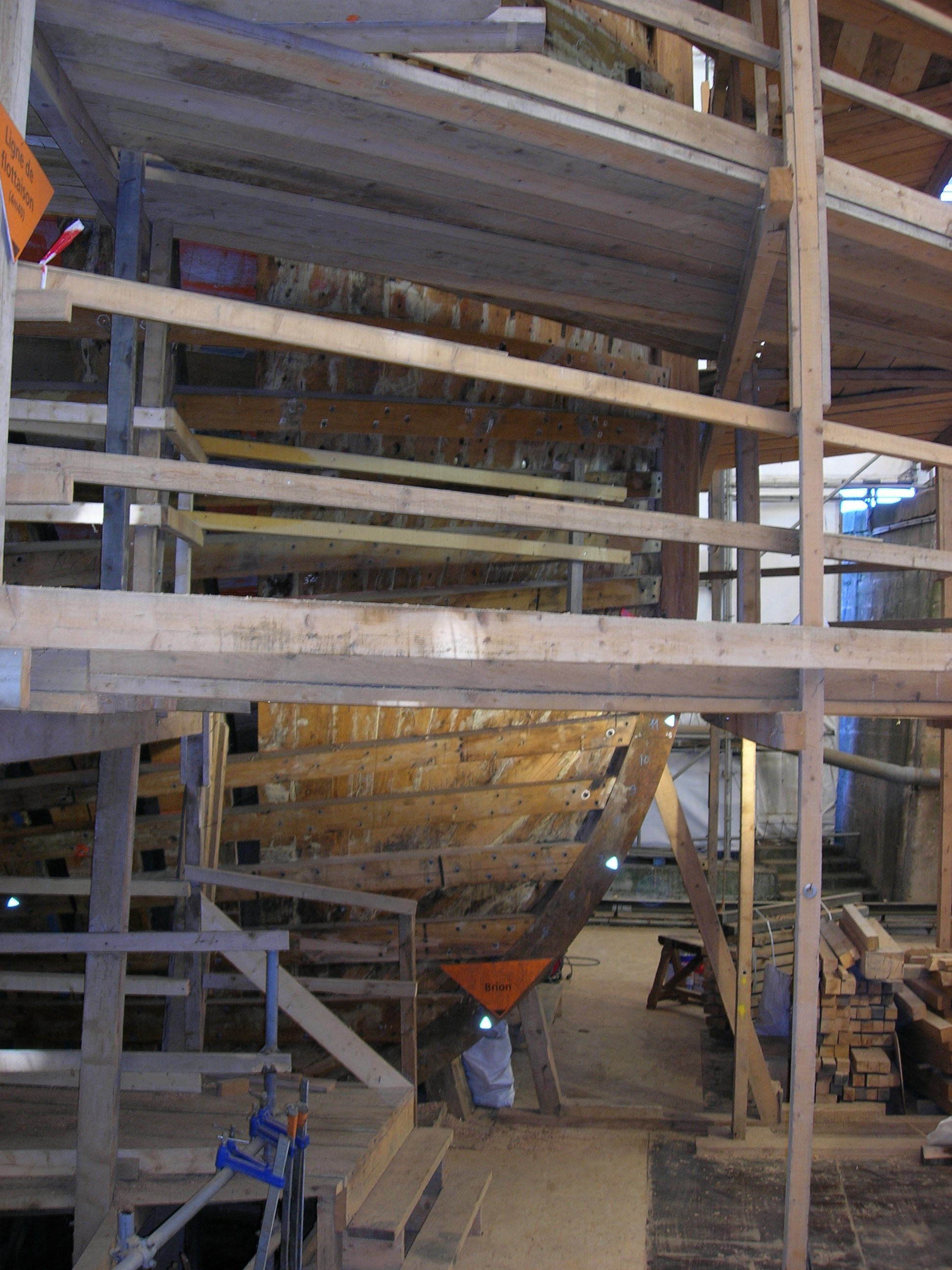

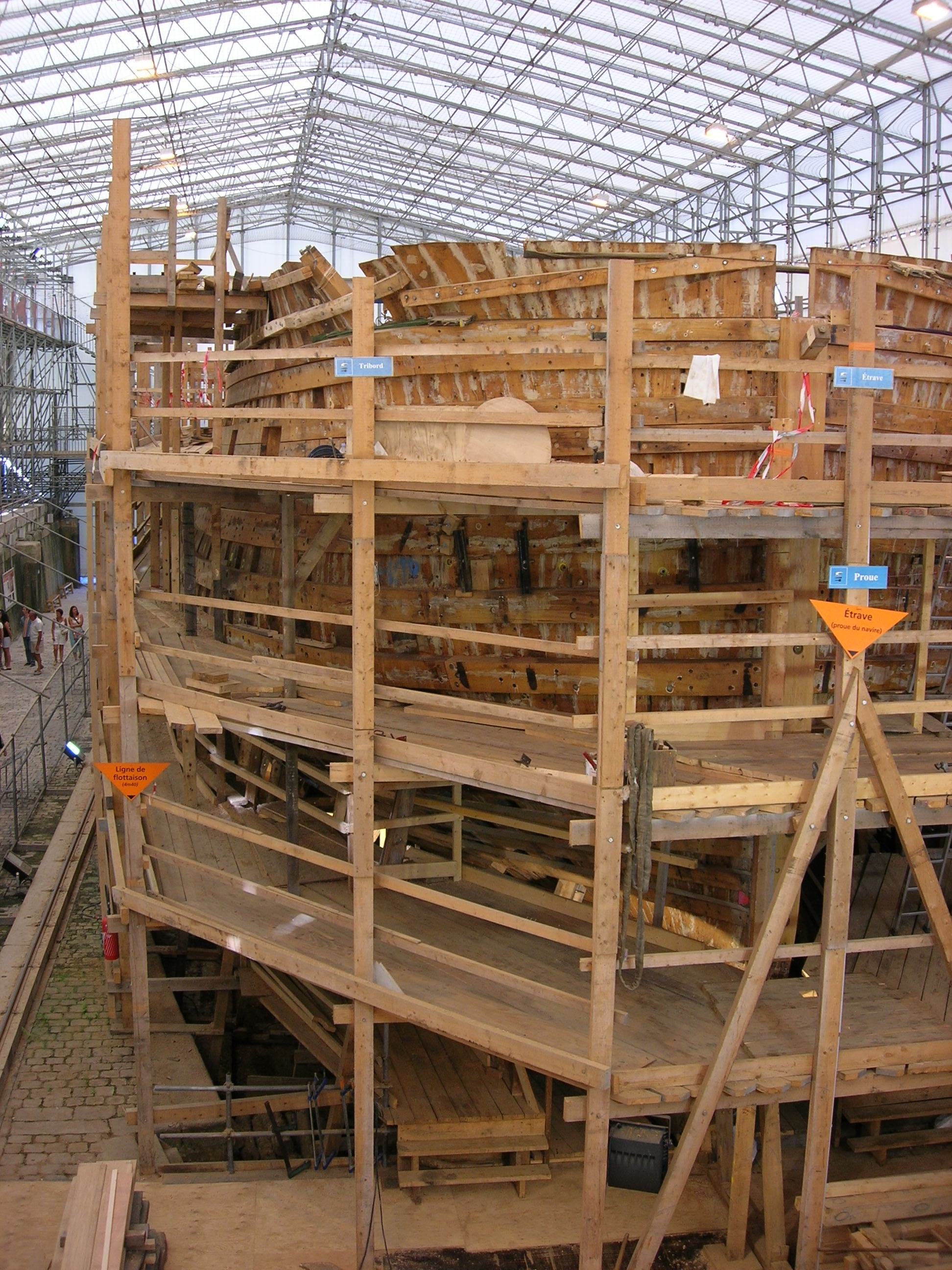

Photographs of the construction from 2006.

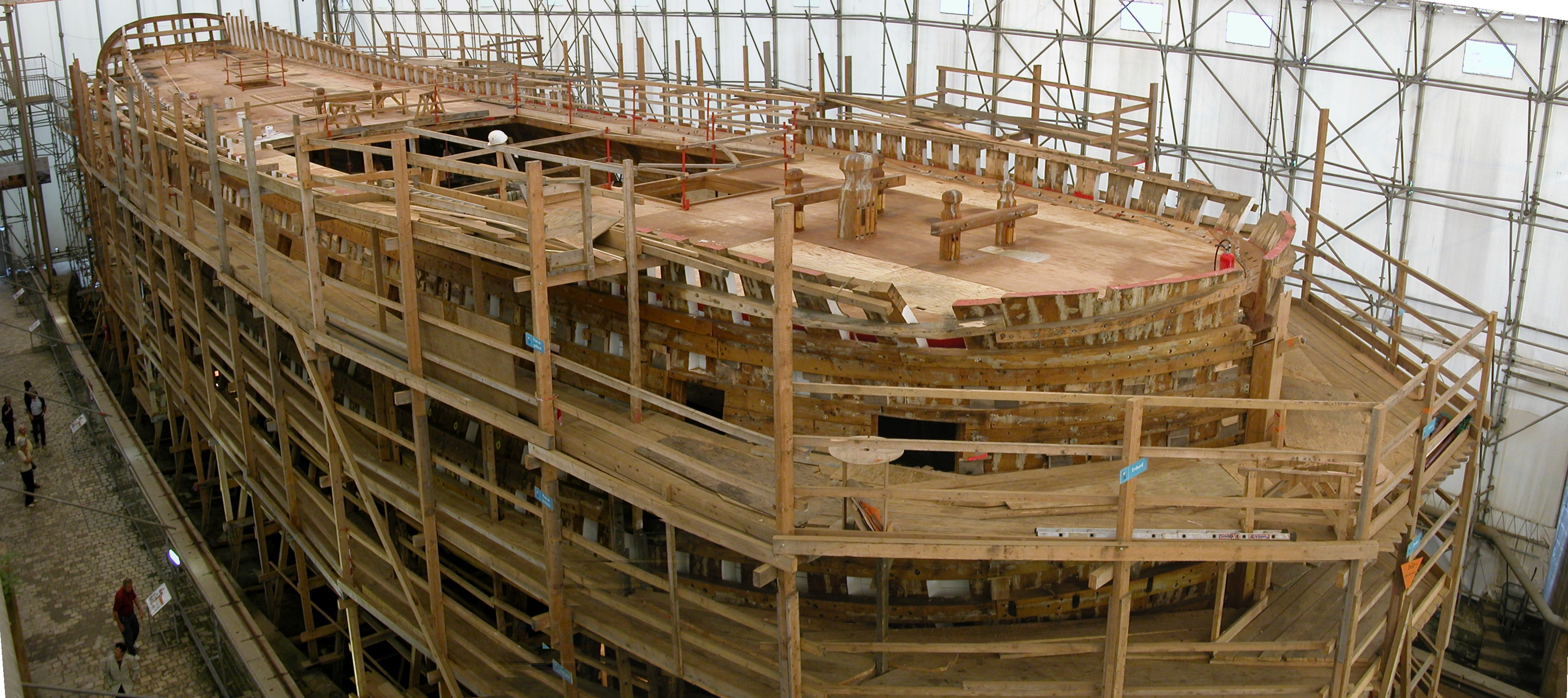

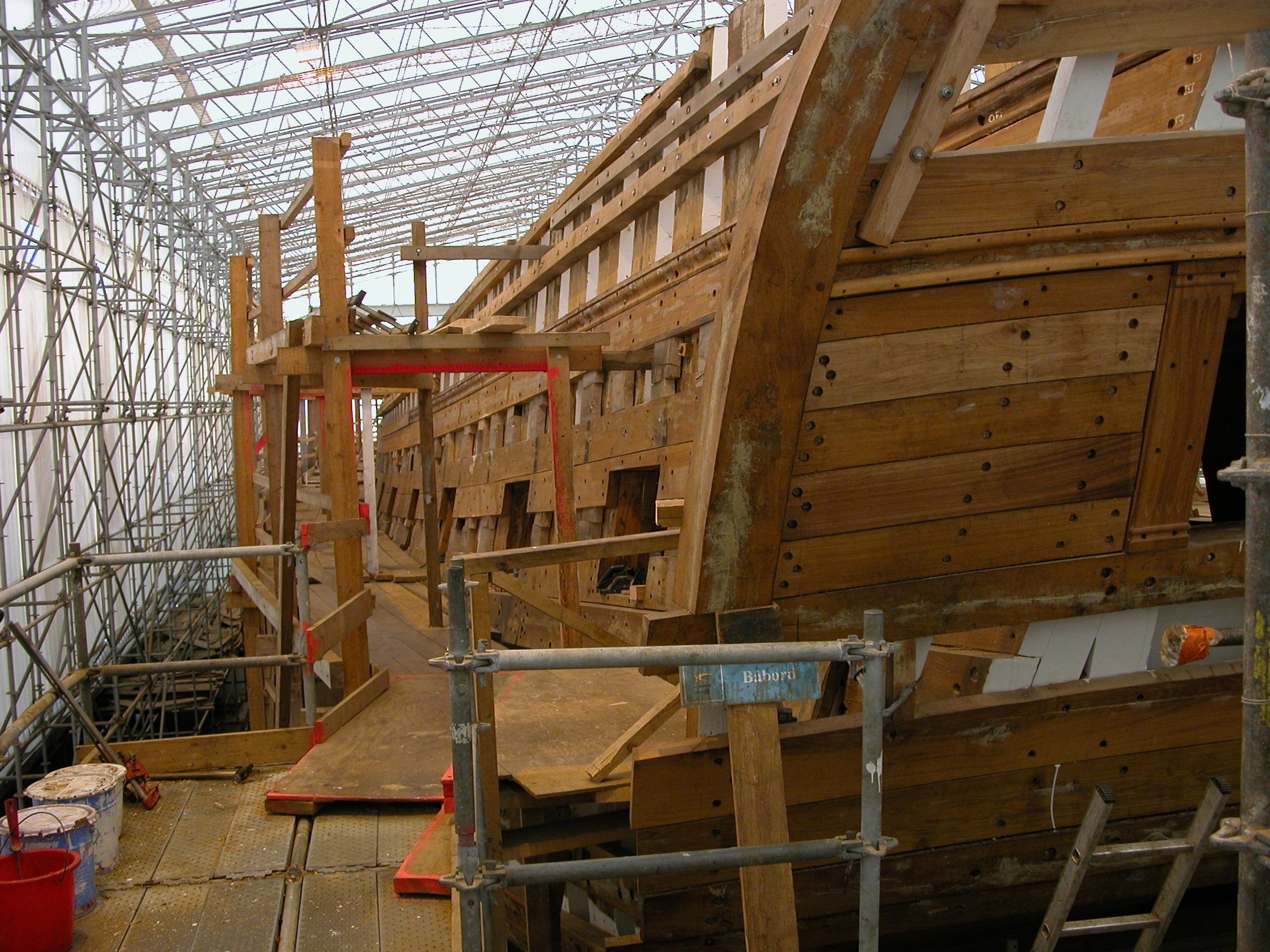

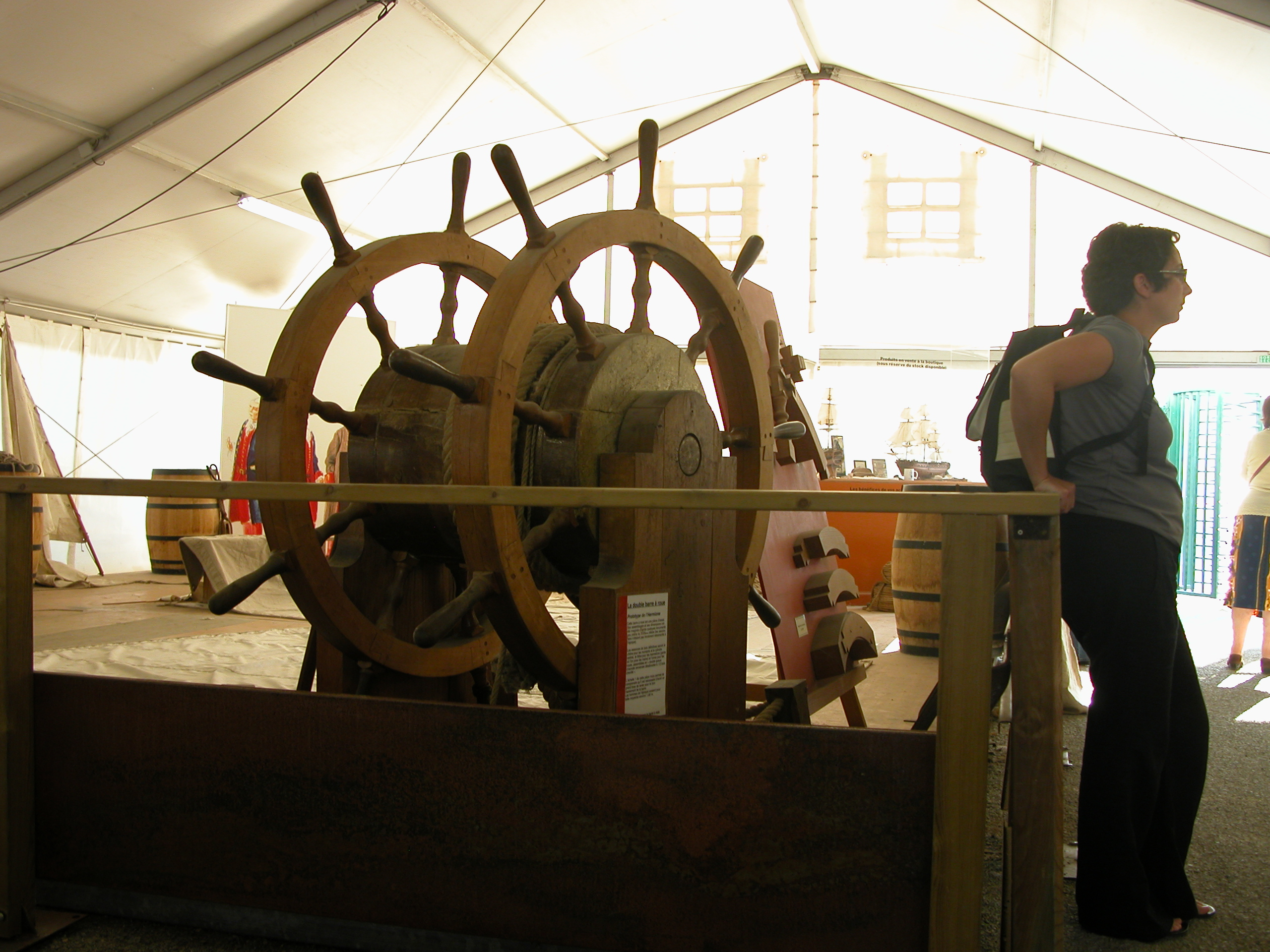

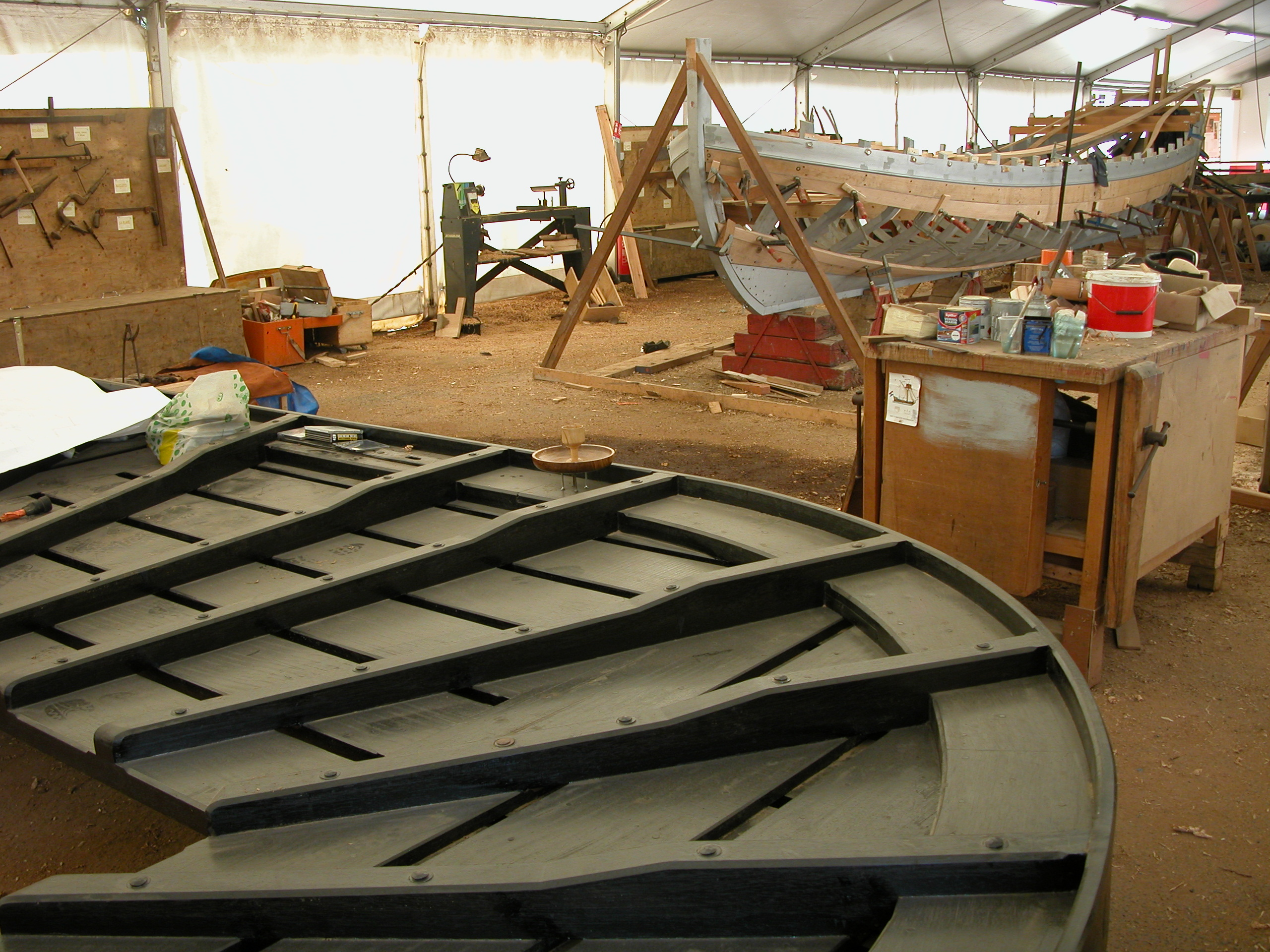

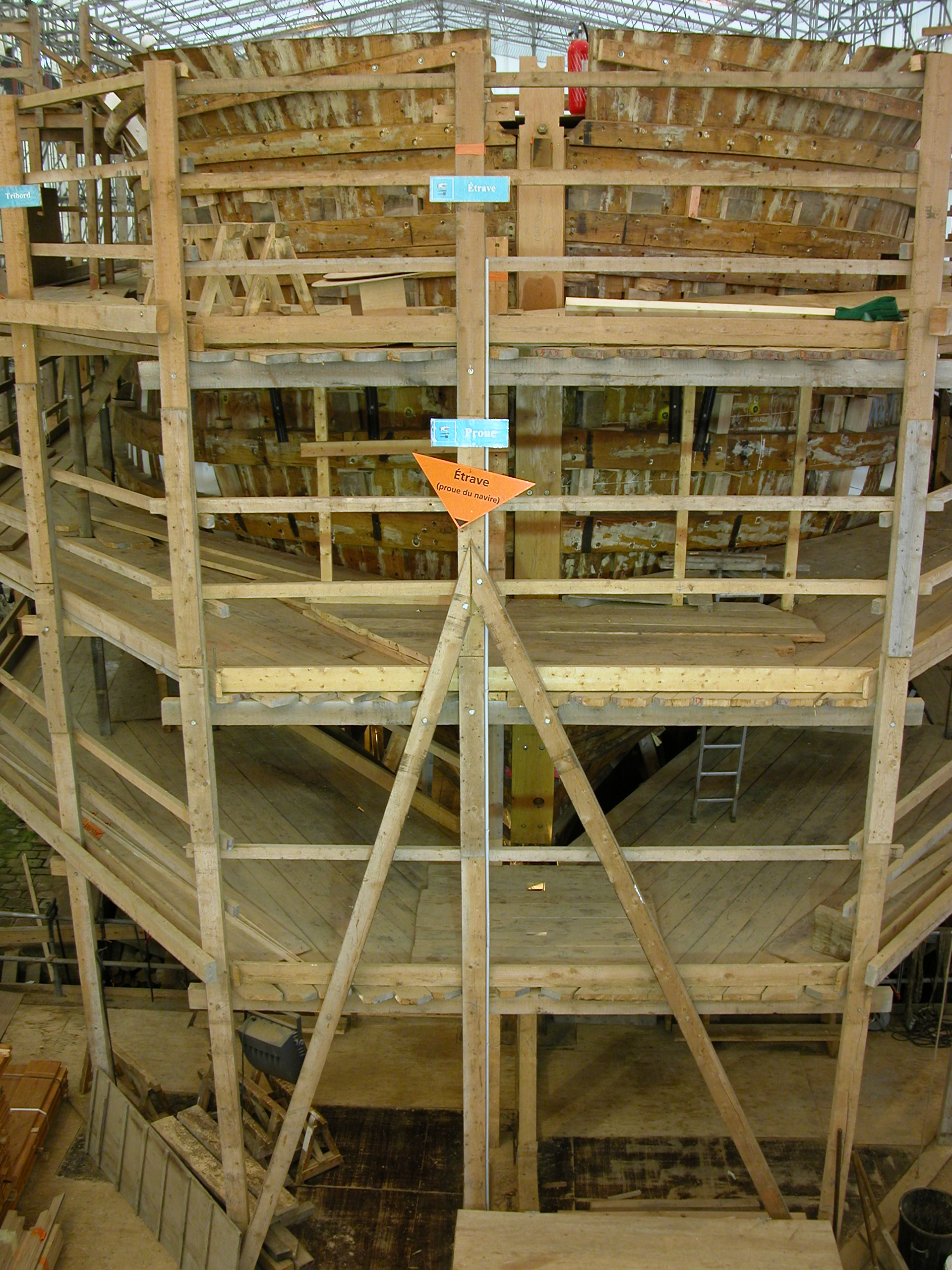

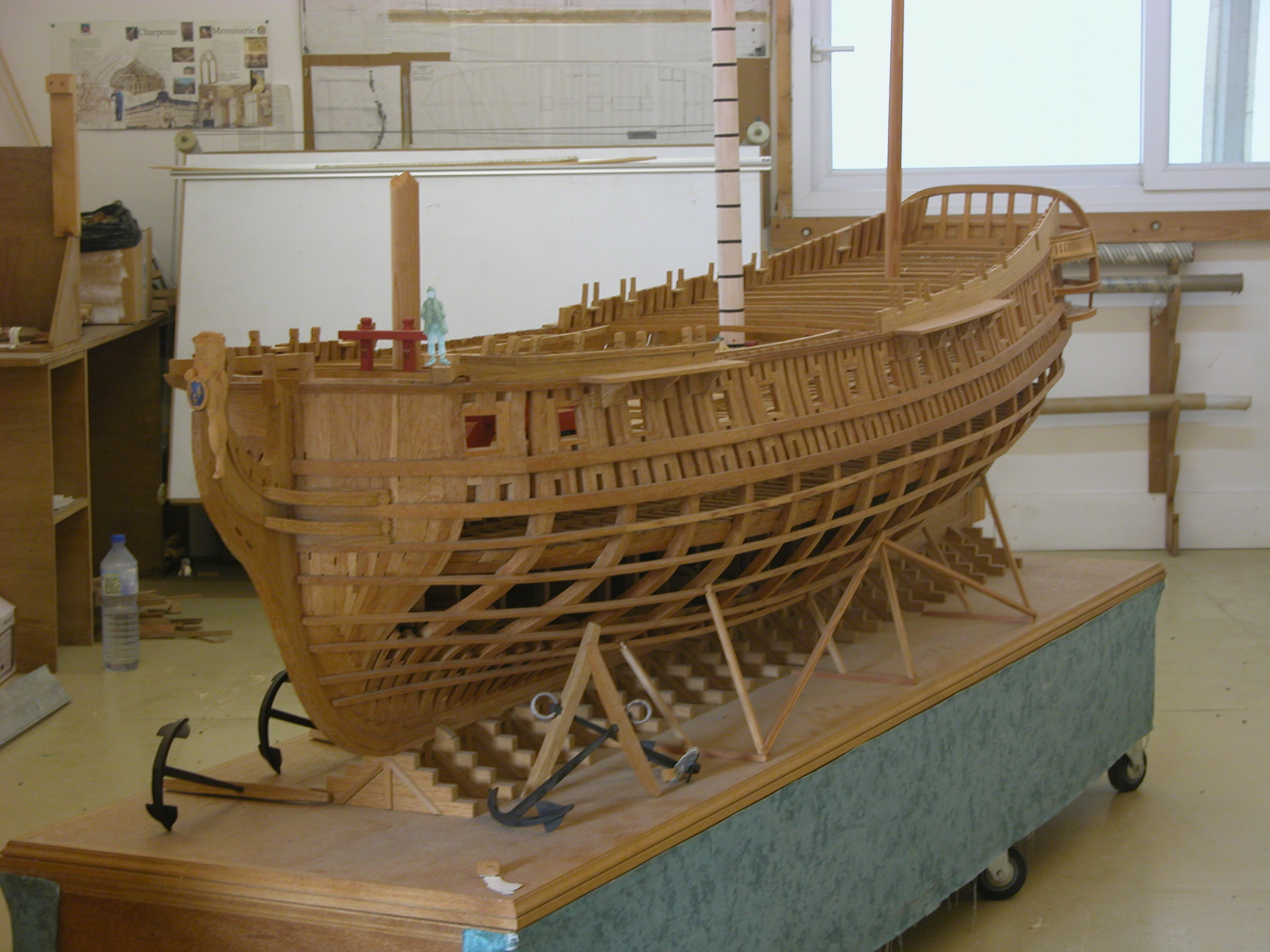

Photographs of the construction from 2009.

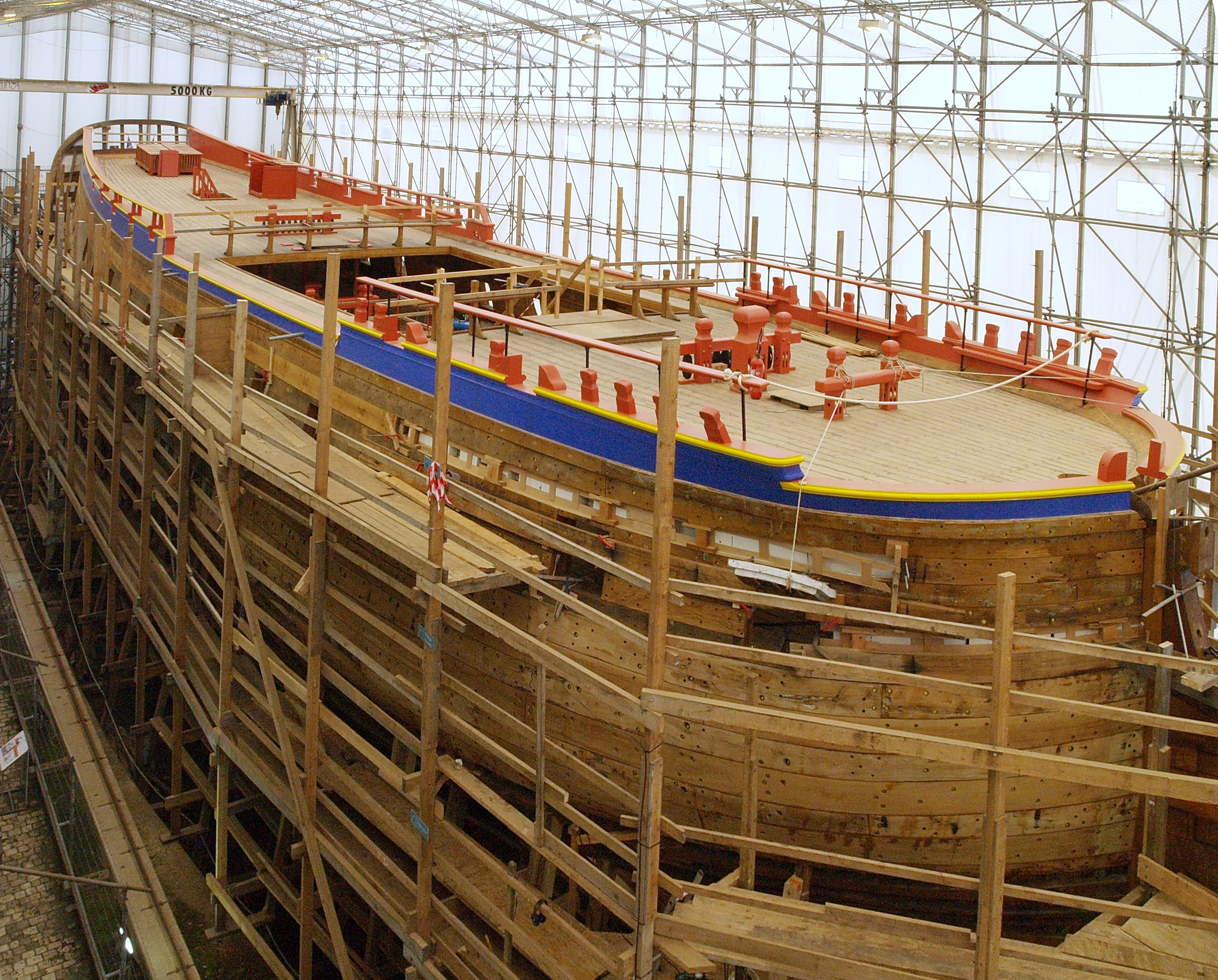
April 2009: the bulwarks have been painted, the Officers' ladder is in its place.

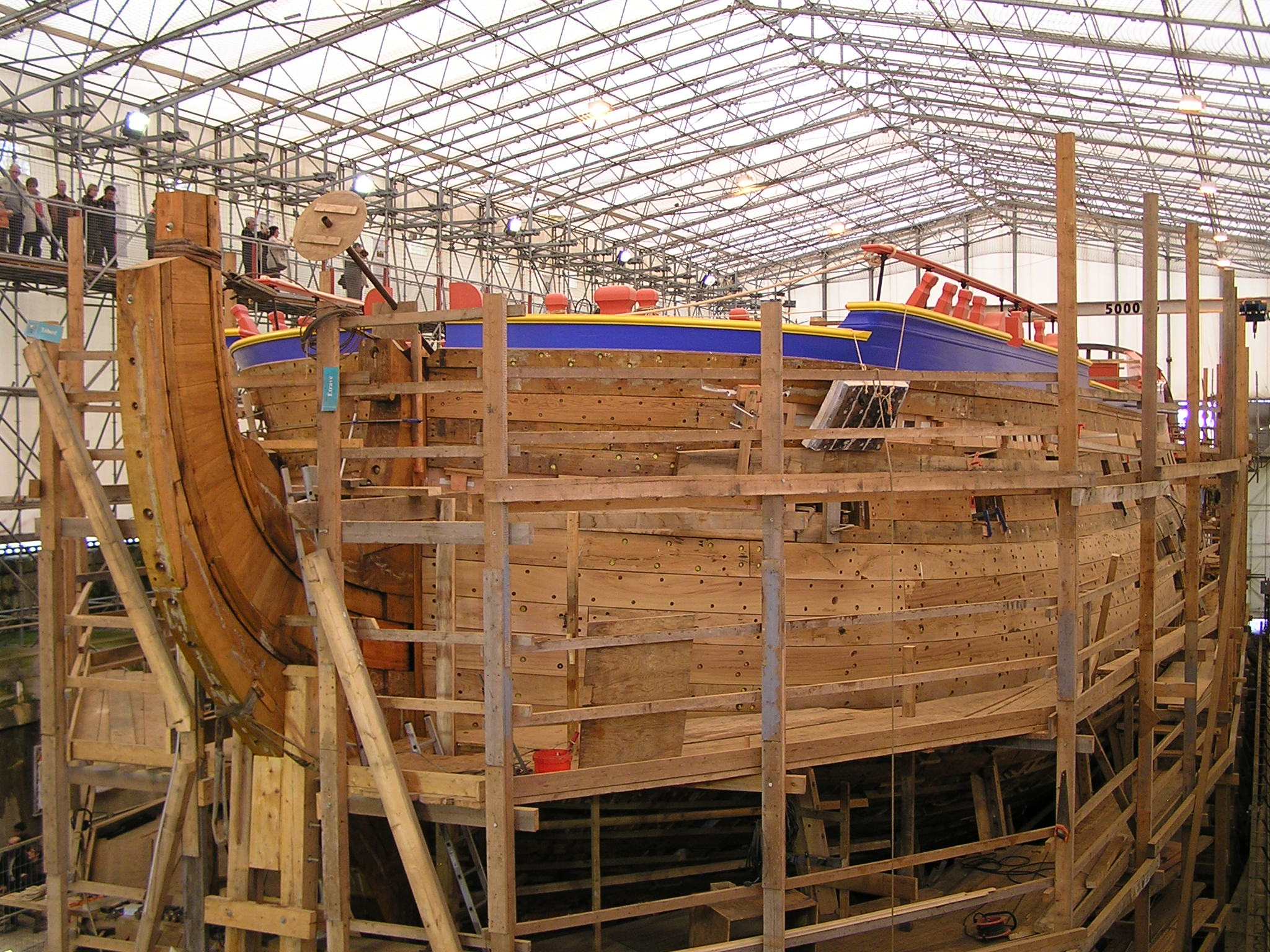
The bow of the frigate.

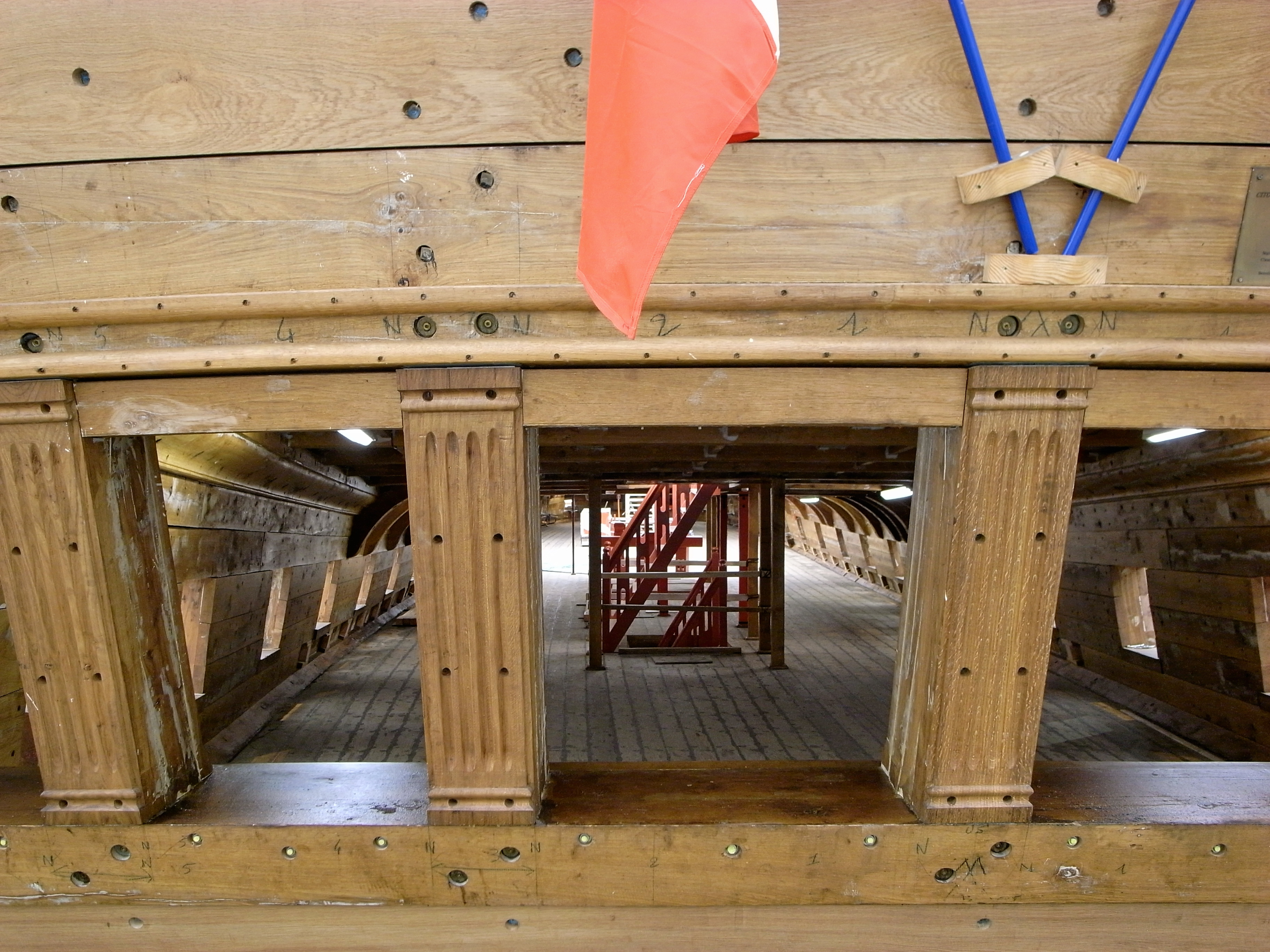
The Officers' ladder seen by the stern.

Photographs after completion

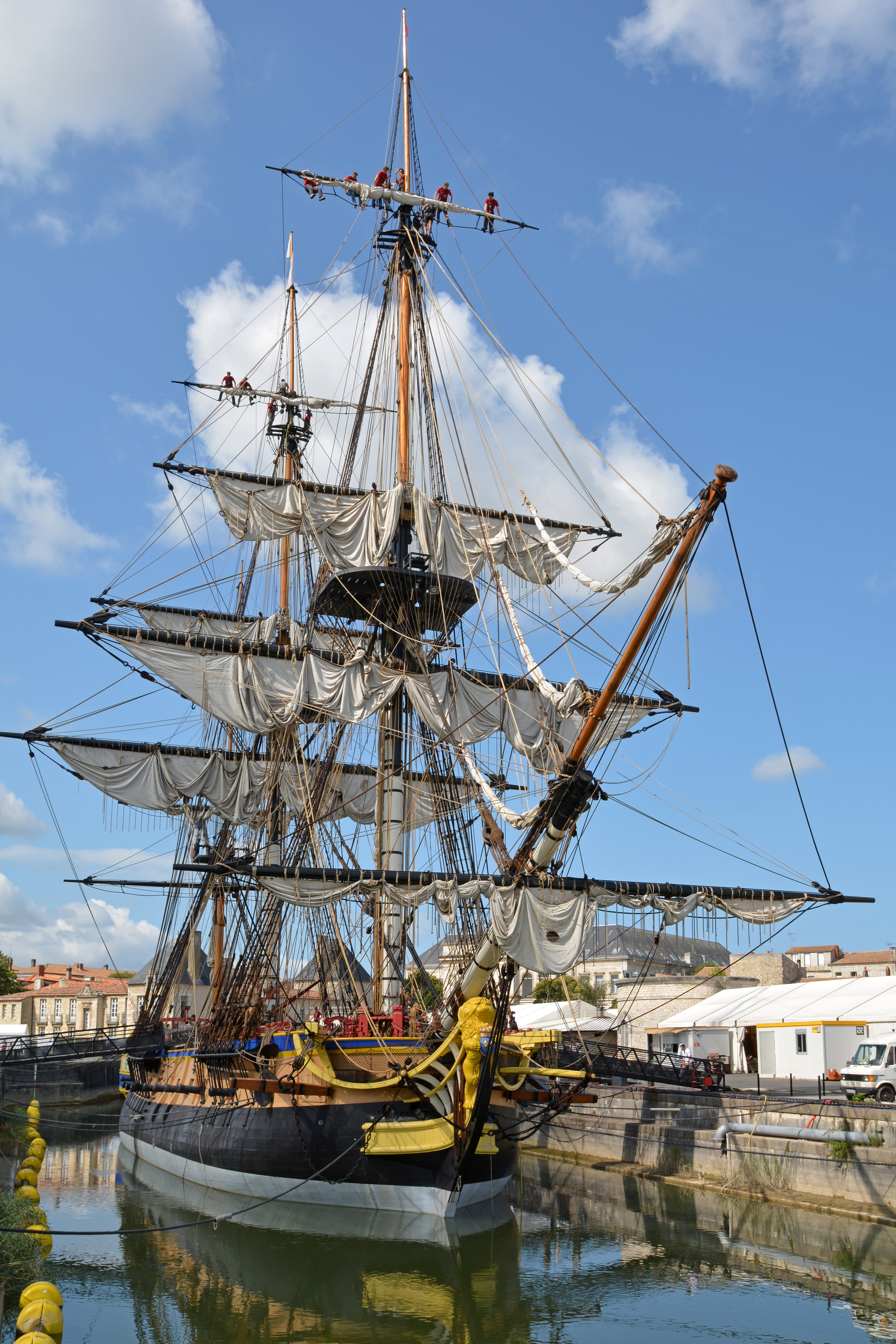

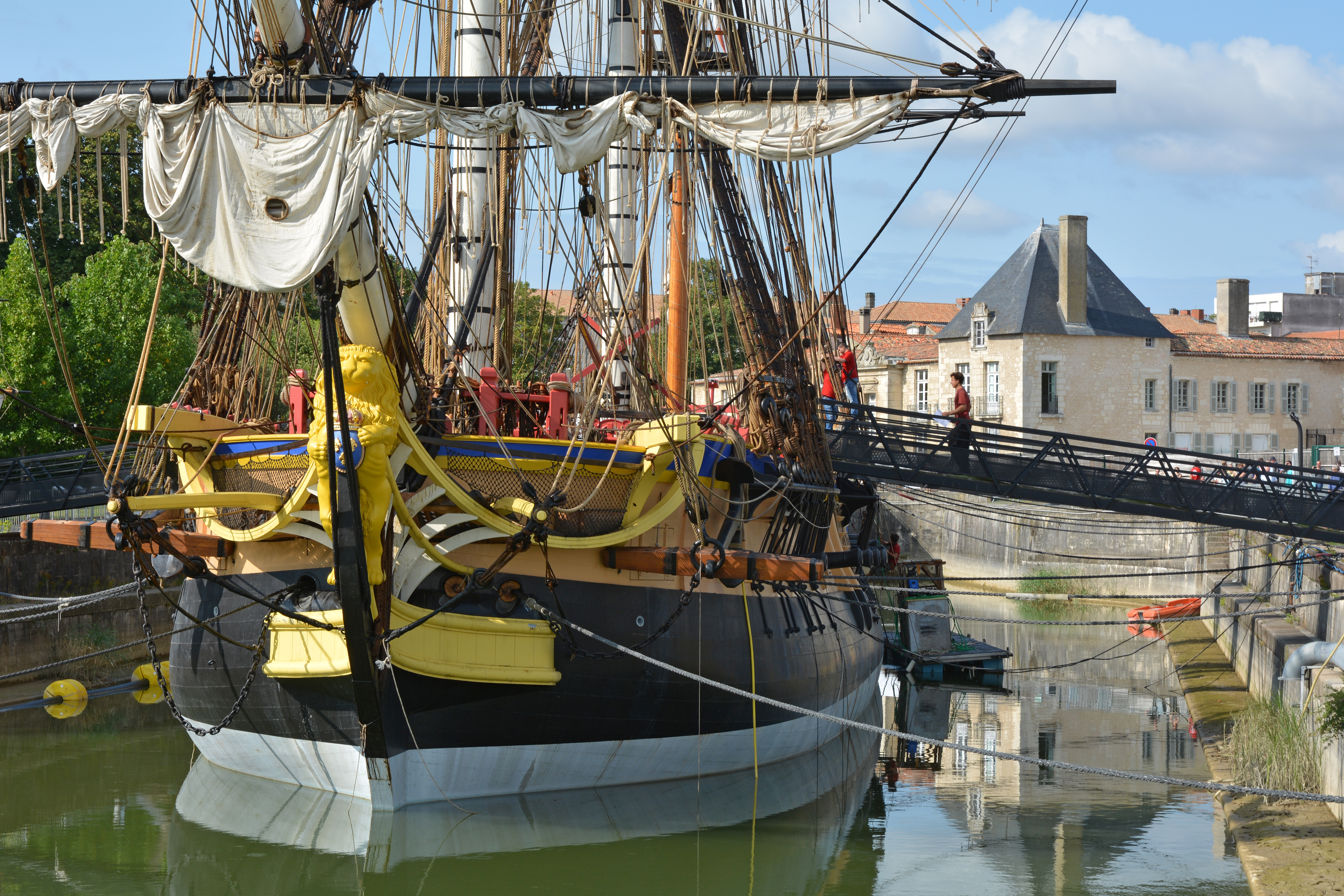

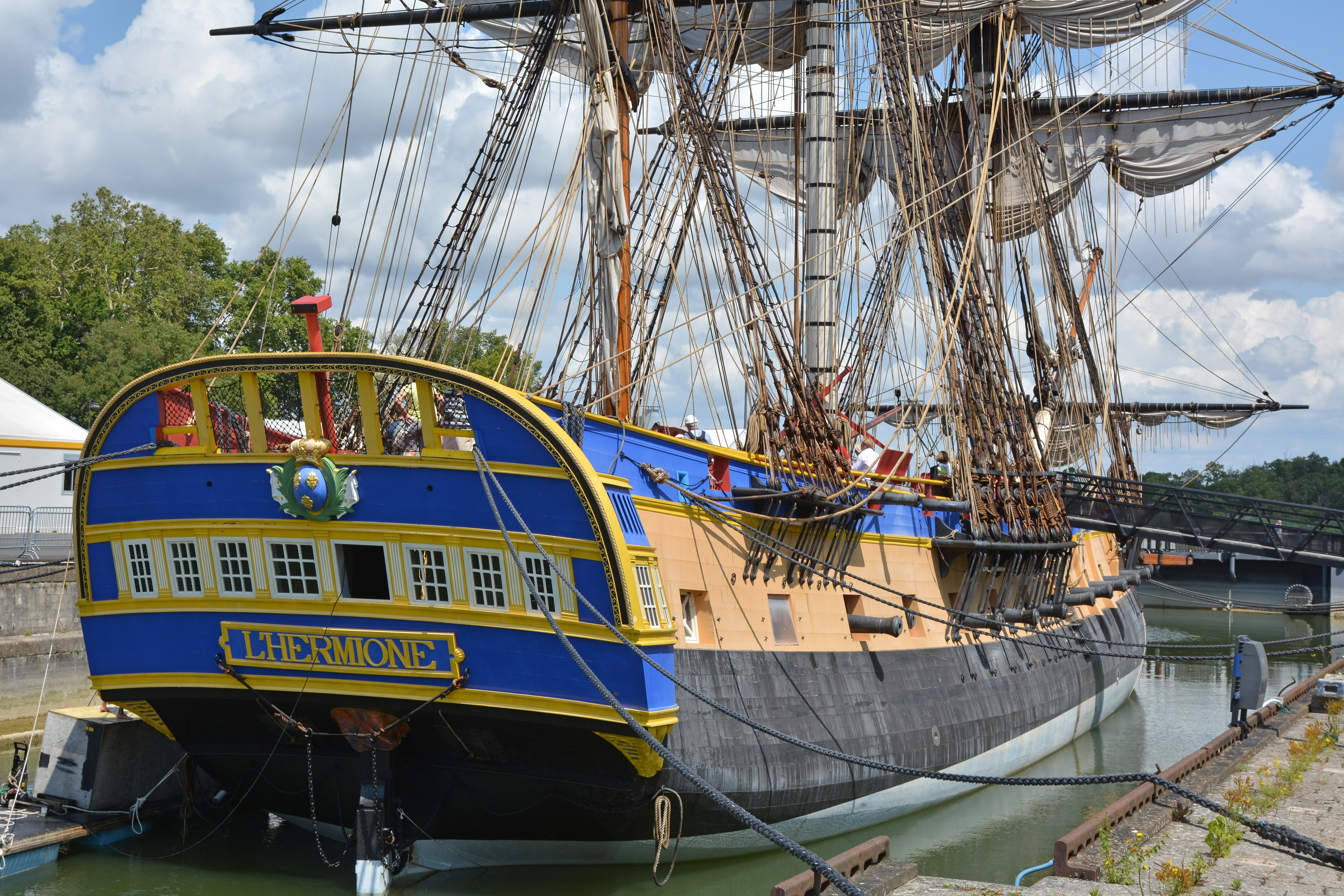

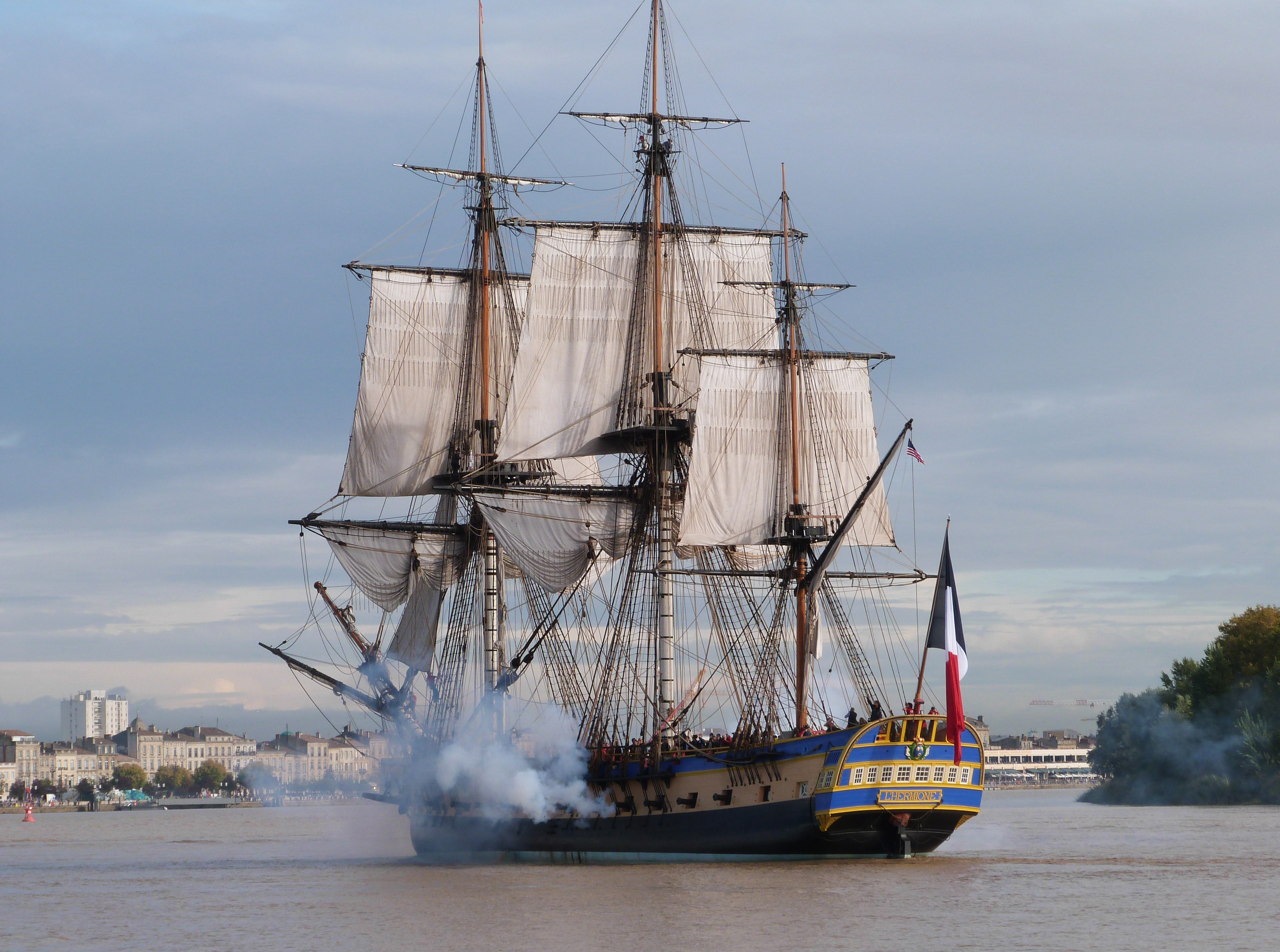

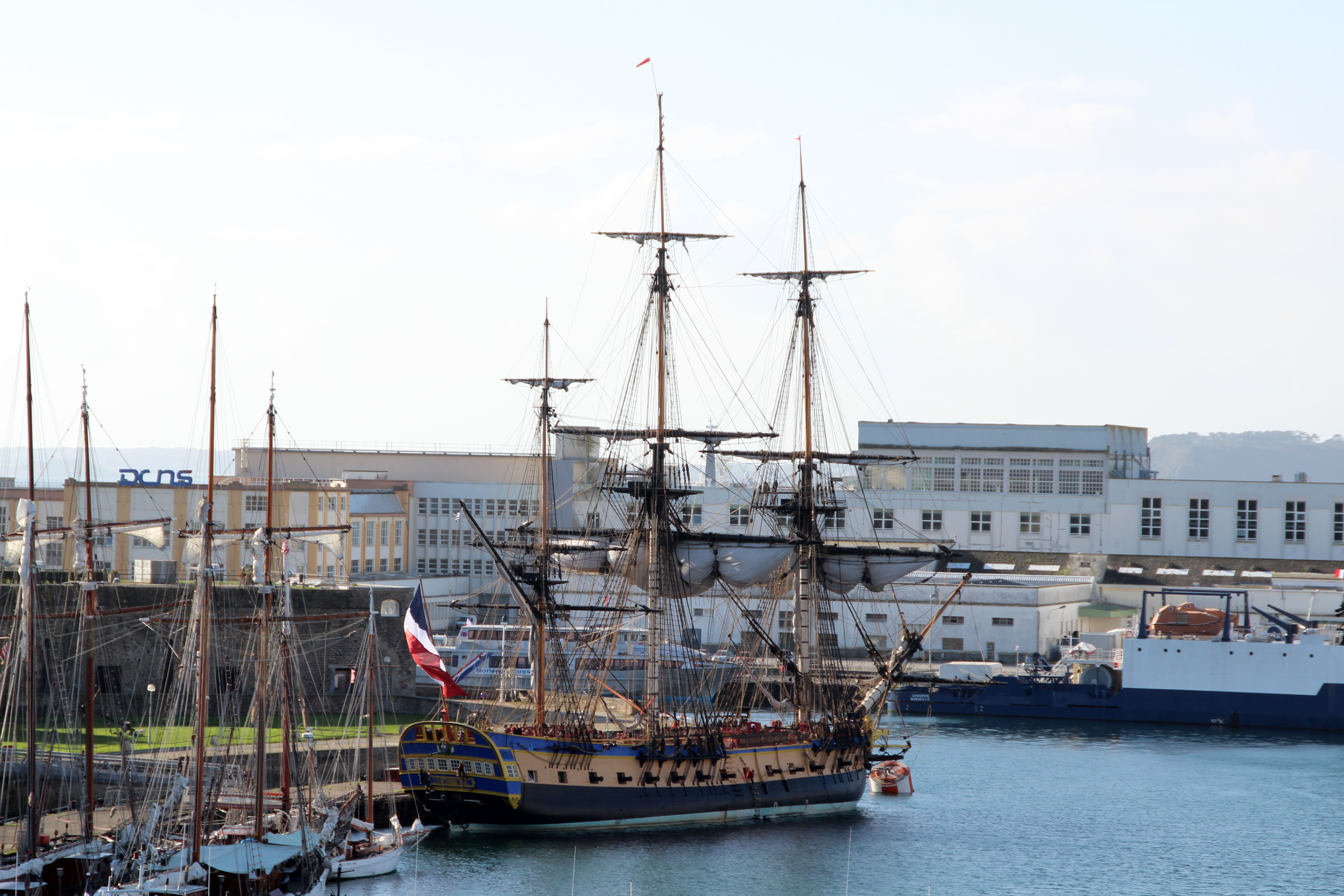

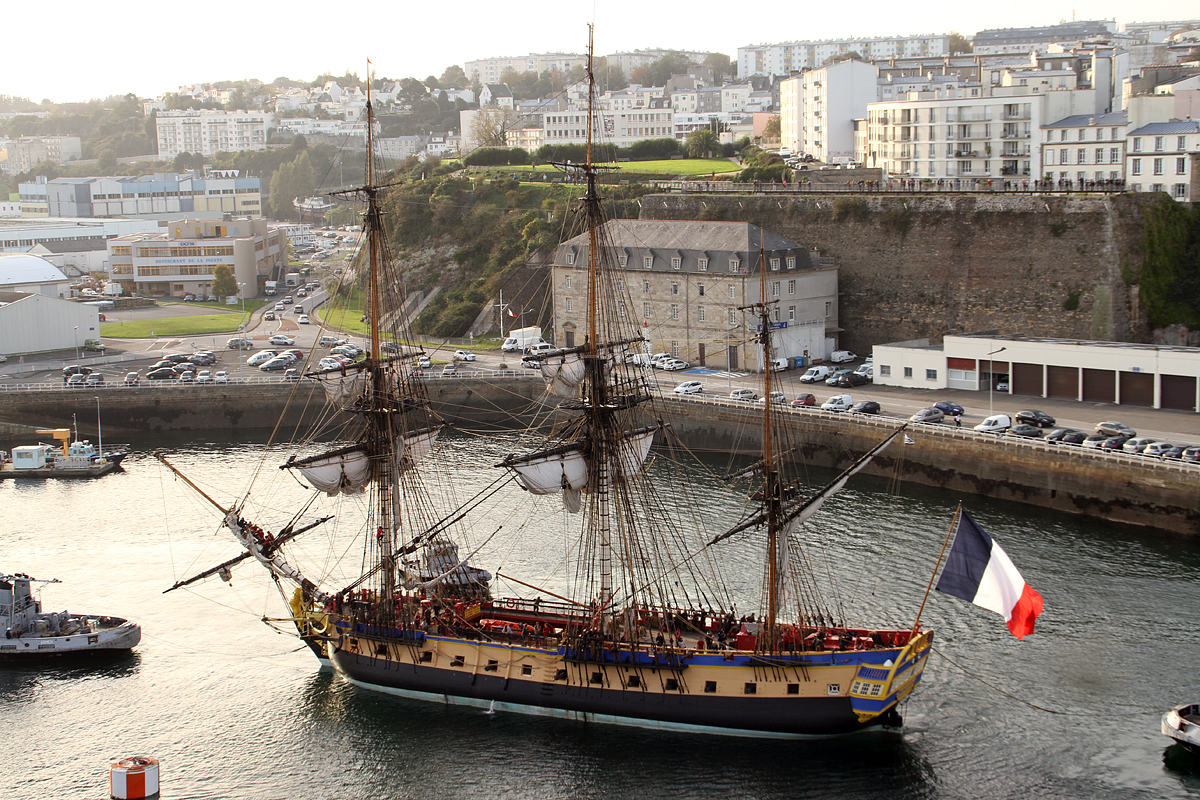

== See also ==
- Götheborg (ship), a sailing replica of an 18th-century Swedish East Indiaman.
- Kalmar Nyckel, a replica of the 17th century merchant ship that brought Swedes to "New Sweden", the first Swedish colony in America.
- HM Bark Endeavour Replica, a replica of the 18th century bark commanded by Lieutenant James Cook.

== Bibliography ==
- Emmanuel de Fontainieu, Yves Gaubert, L'Hermione, de Rochefort à la gloire américaine, Editions de Monza, 2002 ISBN 978-2-908071-95-5
- Robert Kalbach, Jean-Luc Gireaud, L'Hermione, Frégate des Lumières, Dervy, 2004 ISBN 978-2-84454-319-6
- Jean-Marie Ballu, L'Hermione, l'aventure de sa reconstruction, Editions du Gerfaut, 2007 ISBN 978-2-35191-018-4
- James M. Volo, Blue Water Patriots: The American Revolution Afloat, Greenwood Publishing Group, 2007 ISBN 978-0-275-98907-1
