= French frigate Courageuse (1778) =

History

France
- Name: Courageuse
- Builder: Rochefort
- Laid down: September 1777
- Launched: 28 February 1778
- In service: April 1778
- Fate: Captured June 1799

Great Britain
- Name: HMS Courageuse
- Acquired: By capture June 1799
- Fate: Last listed 1803

General characteristics
- Class & type: Concorde-class 12-pounder frigate
- Displacement: 1,100 tonneaux
- Tons burthen: 550 port tonneaux; 932 (bm)
- Length: 145 ft 0 in (44.20 m) (overall); 121 ft 8 in (37.08 m) (keel)
- Beam: 39 ft 0 in (11.89 m)
- Draught: 4.38 m (14.4 ft) (unladen)
- Depth of hold: 11 ft 6 in (3.51 m)
- Complement: 255
- Armament: Upperdeck:26 × 12-pounder long guns; QD: 6 × 6-pounder guns

Courageuse was a 12-pounder Concorde-class frigate of the French Navy. She was launched in 1778. The British captured her in 1799 and thereafter used her as a receiving ship or prison hulk at Malta before breaking her up in 1802.

== Career ==
In 1790, under Captain (Note: "Major de vaisseau"; Fonds Marine, p.22) de Grasse-Briançon, Courageuse was part of the Toulon squadron under Poute de Nieuil. From 2 August, she ferried troops and civil commissioners to Corsica, and cruised in the area before making a port call to Ajaccio and eventually returning to Toulon on 30 October.

In 1792, under Captain de La Croix de Saint-Vallier, Courageuse sailed off Smyrna, Saloniki, and Tripoli, returning to Smyrna on 6 December. In January 1793, she escorted a convoy to Marseille, and from there returned to Toulon, arriving on 12 May.

Courageuse took part in the Croisière du Grand Hiver in the winter of 1794–1795, under Captain Dalbarade. She was part of the naval division under Rear-Admiral Renaudin, which arrived in Toulon on 2 April 1795.

In mid 1795, she was part of the station of the Gulf of Roses, under Lieutenant Pourquier, (Note: One source gives his first name as "Honoré".) supporting the Army of the Pyrenees in the Siege of Roses. On 9 July, she defended herself against a Spanish squadron, composed of 16 gunboats, supported by three frigates and two ships of the line. Courageuse, supported by artillery fire from French-held forts, successfully fended off the attack.

In the fleet of Toulon, Courageuse took part in the Mediterranean campaign of 1798; after the Battle of the Nile, she was armed en flûte and ferried supplies for the French Army in Egypt and Syria.

Under Captain Trullet, Courageuse was part of the Syrian naval station under Rear-Admiral Perrée. She ferried artillery and ammunition of the French Army besieging Acre; on 9 April 1799, she captured the British gunboat Foudre.

HMS Centaur captured Courageuse in the action of 18 June 1799.

== Fate ==
French sources report that Courageuse was used as a prison hulk for French prisoners at Port Mahon. British sources report that the British commissioned HMS Courageuse under Commander John Richards. She served as a receiving ship until at least 1803. Alternatively, served as a receiving or prison ship at Malta where she was broken up in 1802.

== Note ==
A few weeks after Centaur captured Courqageuse, HMS Alcmene captured the French privateer Courageux near the Azores. She may have come into Gibraltar and have been taken into service as HMS Lutine. She was sold for breaking up at the Peace of Amiens. The coincidence of two prizes with almost identical names being at the same place at the same time and both being taken into the Royal Navy in the theatre has resulted in some confusion of the vessels. The capture on 29 March 1800 of a Courageux that was taken into Minorca, and the existence in 1800 of a French naval brig at Toulon named Courageux only adds to the confusion.

== See also ==
- List of ship names of the Royal Navy
