= Louis-Léonce Trullet =

Louis-Léonce Trullet (Saint-Tropez, 6 October 1756 – Toulon, 1 February 1827) was a French Navy officer.

== Biography ==
Born to a family of sailors, and younger brother of Jean-François-Timothée Trullet, Louis-Léonce Trullet joined the Navy as a cabin boy on Séduisant in 1768. He served as a sailor on a number of ships before rising to helmsman in 1775.

From July 1776, he served as a lieutenant on a merchantman and rose in rank until captaining ships by 1784.

In September 1793, Trullet was tasked by the French ambassador in Constantinople with ferrying despatches to France. Arriving at Fort de Brégançon, his ship was intercepted by the British, but he managed to repulse them and secure the documents. In recognition of his behaviour, he was promoted to captain in January 1794.

In 1797, Trullet commanded the Guillaume Tell and later the Conquérant, and in 1798, the Peuple Souverain and later the Timoléon.

On Timoléon, Trullet took part in the Battle of the Nile, at the rearmost position in the French line. Fighting against three British ships, he ran aground and set his ship on fire to prevent her capture.

From December 1795, Trullet commanded the Carrère, and later the Courageuse. Captured at the action of 18 June 1799 and taken prisoner to England, Trullet was released on parole the next month.

In 1800, he took command of a frigate squadron in Italy.

From 1803, Trullet served ashore, until he retired in 1814.

== Sources and references ==
- Dictionnaire des capitaines de vaisseau de Napoléon, Danielle & Bernard Quintin, SPM, 2003, ISBN 2-901952-42-9
