= French ship Commerce de Bordeaux (1785) =

Ship of the line of the French Navy

- Scale model of Achille, sister ship of French ship Commerce de Bordeaux (1785), on display at the Musée national de la Marine in Paris.

History

France
- Name: Commerce de Bordeaux
- Builder: Toulon
- Laid down: September 1784
- Launched: 15 September 1785
- In service: 1786
- Renamed: Timoléon, February 1794
- Fate: Ran aground and burnt at the Battle of the Nile, August 1798

General characteristics
- Class & type: Téméraire-class ship of the line
- Displacement: 3,069 tonneaux
- Tons burthen: 1,537 port tonneaux
- Length: 55.87 m (183 ft 4 in)
- Beam: 14.46 m (47 ft 5 in)
- Draught: 7.15 m (23.5 ft)
- Depth of hold: 7.15 m (23 ft 5 in)
- Sail plan: Full-rigged ship
- Crew: 705
- Armament: 74 guns: Lower gun deck: 28 × 36-pounder long guns; Upper gun deck: 30 × 18-pounder long guns; Forecastle and Quarterdeck: 12 × 8-pounder long guns, 10 × 36-pounder carronades

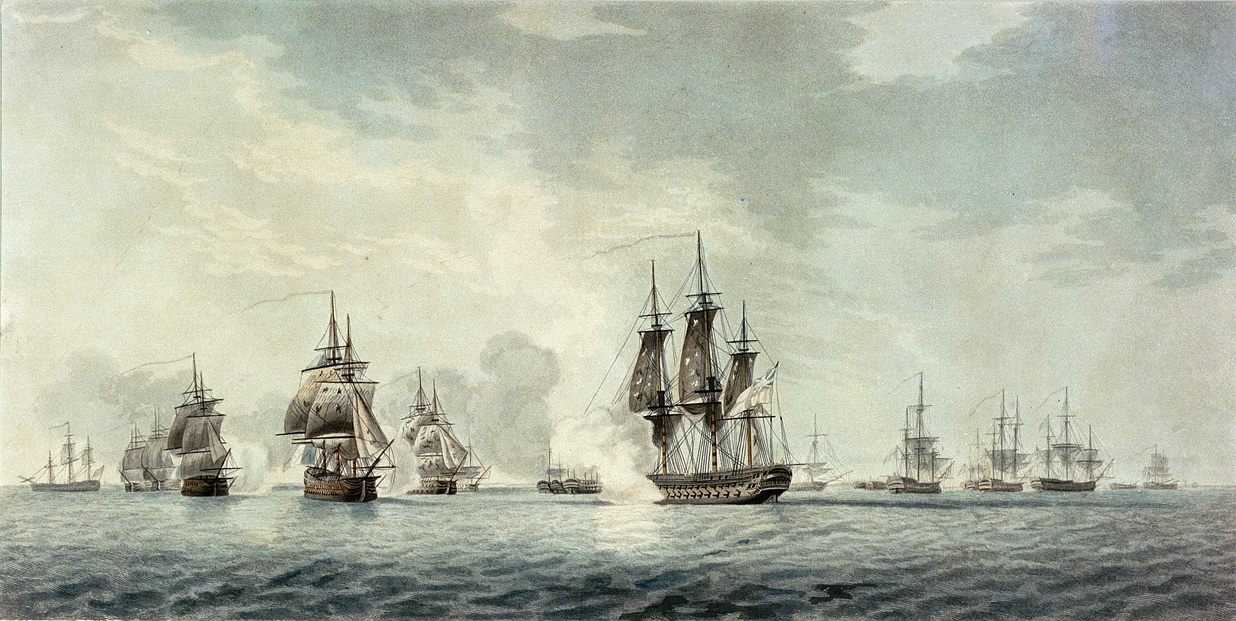
Timoleon (first from left) at the Battle of the Nile

Commerce de Bordeaux was a 74-gun Téméraire-class ship of the line built for the French Navy during the 1780s. She was funded by a don des vaisseaux donation from Bordeaux. Completed in 1786, she served in the French Revolutionary Wars and the Napoleonic Wars. Commerce de Bordeaux was burnt by her crew during the Battle of the Nile in 1798 to prevent her capture by the British.

== Description ==
The Téméraire-class ships had a length of 55.87 metres (183 ft 4 in), a beam of 14.46 metres (47 ft 5 in) and a depth of hold of 7.15 metres (23 ft 5 in). The ships displaced 3,069 tonneaux and had a mean draught of 7.15 metres (23 ft 5 in). They had a tonnage of 1,537 port tonneaux. Their crew numbered 705 officers and ratings during wartime. They were fitted with three masts and ship rigged.

The muzzle-loading, smoothbore armament of the Téméraire class consisted of twenty-eight 36-pounder long guns on the lower gun deck, thirty 18-pounder long guns and thirty 18-pounder long guns on the upper gun deck. On the quarterdeck and forecastle were a total of a dozen 8-pounder long guns and 10 36-pounder carronades.

== Construction and career ==
Commerce de Bordeaux was ordered in 1784 and was laid down at the Arsenal de Toulon in May. The ship launched on 15 September 1785 and was named on 23 January 1786 because she had been funded by merchants from Bordeaux. She was completed sometime later in the year. Commerce de Bordeaux participated in the French expedition to Sardinia in 1792–1793. The ship was renamed Bonnet Rouge in December 1793 and then Timoléon in February 1794. She took part in the Battle of the Nile under Captain Louis-Léonce Trullet; her crew was forced to burn her to prevent her capture by the British.

== Bibliography ==
- Roche, Jean-Michel (2005). Dictionnaire des bâtiments de la flotte de guerre française de Colbert à nos jours [Dictionary of French Warships from Colbert to Today]. Vol. 1: 1671-1870. Roche. ISBN 978-2-9525917-0-6. OCLC 165892922.
- Winfield, Rif and Roberts, Stephen S. (2015) French Warships in the Age of Sail 1786-1861: Design, Construction, Careers and Fates. Seaforth Publishing. ISBN 978-1-84832-204-2
