= Concorde-class frigate =

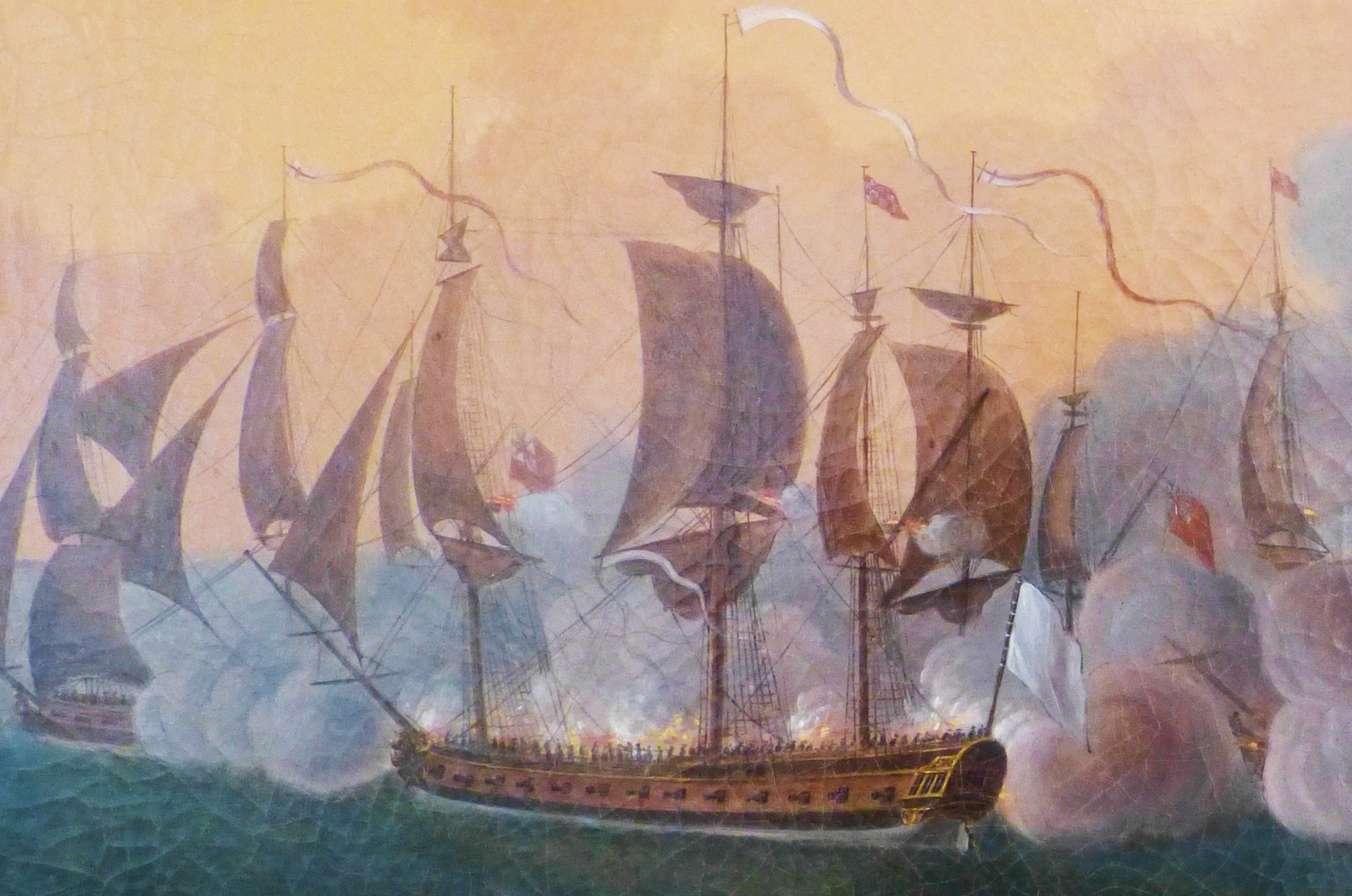
- Hermione in the Naval battle of Louisbourg, by Auguste-Louis de Rossel de Cercy

Class overview
- Name: Concorde class
- Builders: Rochefort
- Operators: French Navy; Royal Navy
- Planned: 3
- Completed: 4 (Note: one is a replica built between 1997 and 2012)
- Preserved: 1

General characteristics
- Type: Frigate
- Displacement: 1,100 tonneaux
- Tons burthen: 550 port tonneaux
- Length: 44.2 m (145.0 ft)
- Beam: 11.2 m (36.7 ft)
- Draught: 4.8 m (15.7 ft)
- Sail plan: Ship-rigged
- Armament: 26 × 12-pounder long guns; 6 × 6-pounder long guns
- Armour: Timber

The Concorde class was a type of 32-gun frigate of the French Navy, designed by Henri Chevillard, carrying 12-pounder long guns as their main armament. Three ships of this type were built between 1778 and 1779, and served during the American War of Independence and the French Revolutionary Wars.

The class is noteworthy for comprising a fourth unit, Hermione (2014), laid down in 1997 and launched in 2014; she is a replica ship of Hermione (1779), famous for ferrying General Lafayette and for her role in the Naval battle of Louisbourg under the command of Lieutenant de Latouche, who would rise to become Vice-admiral Latouche-Tréville.

== Ships ==
- Concorde

Builder: Rochefort
Begun: April 1777
Launched: 3 September 1777
Completed: January 1778
Fate: Captured by the Royal Navy on 15 February 1783. Sold on 21 February 1811.

- Courageuse

Builder: Rochefort
Begun: September 1777
Launched: 28 February 1778
Completed: April 1778
Fate: Captured by HMS Centaur in the action of 18 June 1799

- Hermione

Builder: Rochefort
Begun: March 1778
Launched: 28 April 1779
Completed: June 1779
Fate: Ran aground and wrecked due to a navigation error of her pilot at Croisic on 20 September 1793

- Hermione

Builder: Rochefort
Begun: 1997
Launched: 2014
