= Villiers-le-Duc =

- Commune
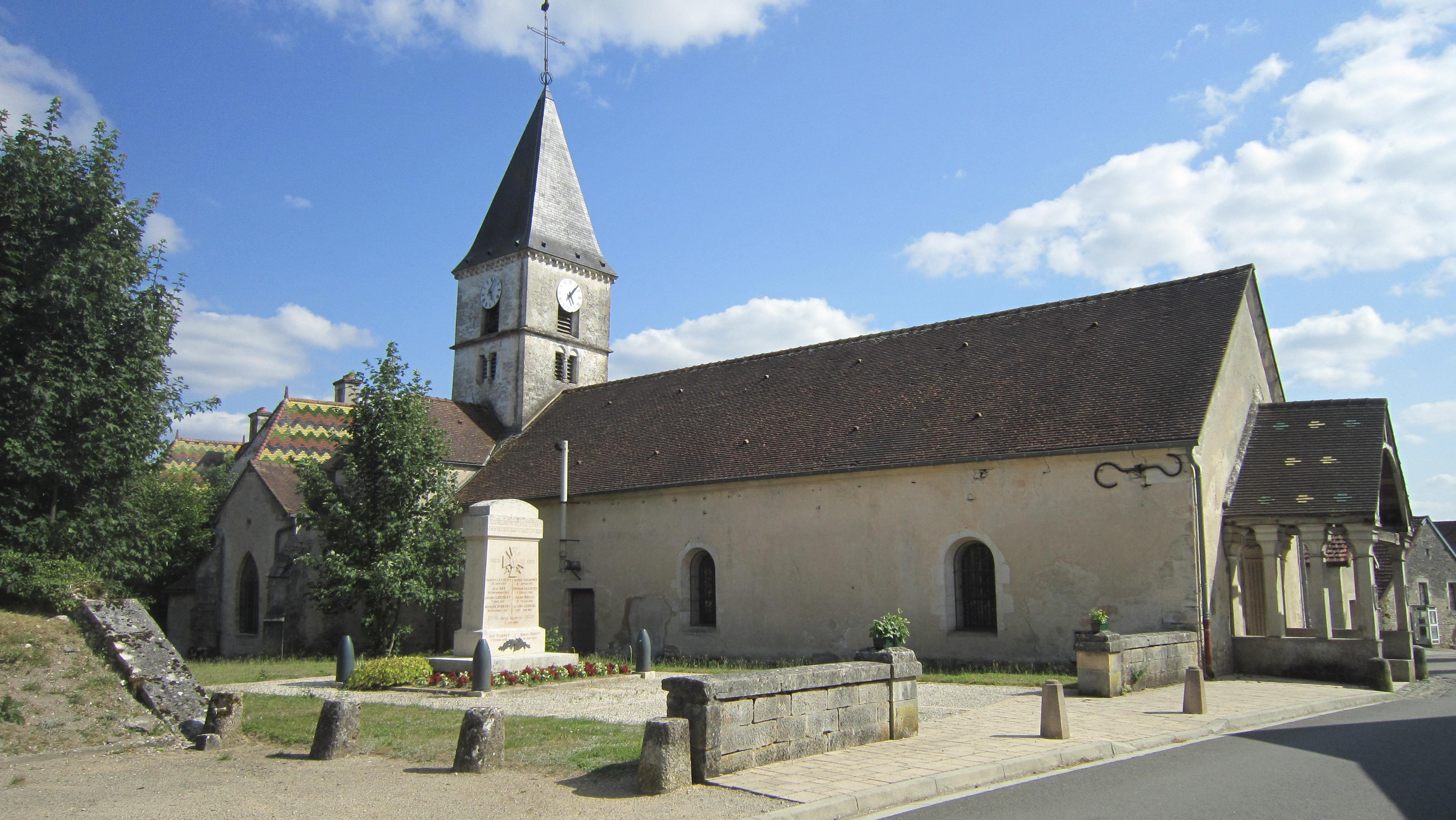
- The church in Villiers-le-Duc

- Coat of arms
- Location of Villiers-le-Duc
- Location within France Location within Bourgogne-Franche-Comté
- Coordinates: 47°49′19″N 4°42′30″E
- Country: France
- Region: Bourgogne-Franche-Comté
- Department: Côte-d'Or
- Arrondissement: Montbard
- Canton: Châtillon-sur-Seine
- Intercommunality: Pays Châtillonnais

Government
  - Mayor (2020–2026): Nicolas Schmit
- Area^{1}: 84.34 km^{2} (32.56 sq mi)
- Elevation: 250 m (820 ft)
- Highest elevation: 417 m (1,368 ft)
- Lowest elevation: 252 m (827 ft)
- Population (2023): 109
  - Density: 1.29/km^{2} (3.35/sq mi)
- Time zone: UTC+01:00 (CET)
  - Summer (DST): UTC+02:00 (CEST)
- INSEE/Postal code: 21704 /21400
- ^{1} French Land Register data, which excludes lakes, ponds, glaciers > 1 km^{2} (0.386 sq mi or 247 acres) and river estuaries.

Villiers-le-Duc (French pronunciation: [vilje lə dyk]) is a commune in the Côte-d'Or department in eastern France.

== Population ==
Historical population
Year	Pop.	±% p.a.
1968	129	—
1975	112	−2.00%
1982	100	−1.61%
1990	118	+2.09%
1999	135	+1.51%
2007	118	−1.67%
2012	93	−4.65%
2017	87	−1.32%
2023	109	+3.83%
Source: INSEE

== See also ==
- Communes of the Côte-d'Or department
