= Spire (disambiguation) =

A spire is a tapering conical or pyramidal structure on the top of a building.

Spire may also refer to:

== Places ==
=== Geography ===
- Spire, French name of the German city Speyer
- The Spire (Graham Land), a rock pinnacle in Antarctica
- The Spire (Rampart Ridge), a rock pinnacle in Antarctica
- Spire Peaks, a mountain in Canada
- Spire Point, a mountain in Washington state

=== Buildings and structures ===
- Spire (Seattle building), residential skyscraper, Washington, US
- Chicago Spire, a cancelled skyscraper in Chicago, US
- Spire of Dublin, a sculpture in Dublin
- Spire London, a planned building near Canary Wharf

== Arts, entertainment, and media ==
=== Comics ===
- Spire Christian Comics
- The Spire (comics), 2015

=== Other uses in arts, entertainment, and media ===
- Spire (social networking service)
- A fictional character in the video game Metroid Prime Hunters
- A Spire for Mansfield or A-Spire, a sculpture in Mansfield, Nottinghamshire, England
- A fictional world in the video game Myst IV: Revelation
- Spire FM, a UK radio station
- The Spire, a 1964 novel by William Golding
- Spire: The City Must Fall, a 2018 fantasy role-playing game

== Brands and enterprises ==
- Spire Credit Union, Minnesota, US
- Spire Global, a data company
- Spire Healthcare, UK
- Spire Inc, St. Louis, Missouri, US
- Spire Sports + Entertainment, North Carolina, US
- Pepsi Spire, a vending machine

== Science and technology ==
- Spire (mollusc), part of the shell
- Spire (synthesizer), a software synthesizer developed by Reveal Sound
- SPIRE, the export control system used by the UK government
- Spire Elite in InterContinental Hotels Group loyalty program
- Spectral and Photometric Imaging Receiver, part of the Herschel Space Observatory
- Systematic Protein Investigative Research Environment, a mass spectrometry analysis site
- University College Dublin's School Of Politics and International Relations

== Sports ==
- SPIRE Institute, Geneva, Ohio; a United States Olympic Training Center
- Spire Motorsports, a NASCAR team

== People ==
- Robert M. Spire (1925–1994), former Attorney General of Nebraska

== See also ==
- Spires (disambiguation)
