= Speyer (disambiguation) =

Speyer is a city in Germany.

Speyer may also refer to:

== People ==
- Speyer family, a prominent Jewish family of German descent
- Chris Speyer (ice hockey) (1902–1966), Canadian hockey player
- Chris Speyer (politician) (born 1941), Canadian politician, Member of Parliament from 1979 to 1988
- Jacob Samuel Speyer (1849–1913), Dutch philologist
- James Speyer (1861–1941), head of New York banking firm Speyer & Co.

== See also ==
- Speer (disambiguation)
- Speier, a surname
- Spier, a town in the Netherlands
- Spire (disambiguation)
- Spires (disambiguation)
