= Pyramid Mountain (Garibaldi Provincial Park) =

Mountain in British Columbia, Canada

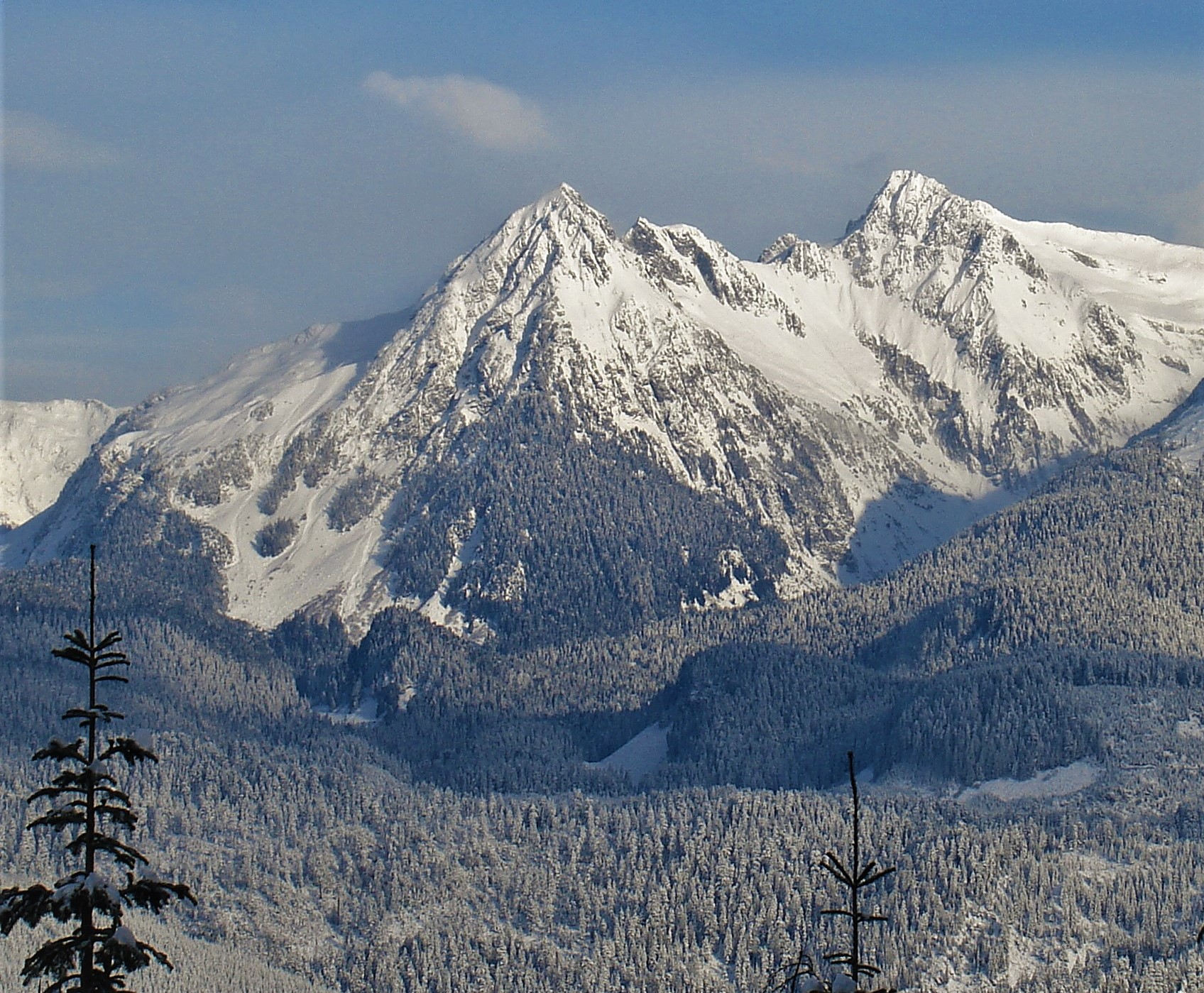
- Southwest aspect, centered (Spire Peak to right)

Highest point
- Elevation: 2,158 m (7,080 ft)
- Parent peak: Spire Peaks (2,279m)
- Listing: Mountains of British Columbia
- Coordinates: 49°49′09″N 122°54′16″W

Geography
- Location within British Columbia Location within Canada
- Interactive map of Pyramid Mountain
- Country: Canada
- Province: British Columbia
- District: New Westminster Land District
- Protected area: Garibaldi Provincial Park
- Parent range: Garibaldi Ranges; Coast Mountains
- Topo map: NTS 92G15 Mamquam Mountain

Pyramid Mountain is a 2,158-metre (7,080-foot) summit located in British Columbia, Canada.

== Description ==
Pyramid Mountain is set on the east side of Mamquam Lake in the southwest section of Garibaldi Provincial Park. It is part of the Garibaldi Ranges of the Coast Mountains. It is situated 55 km (34 mi) north of Vancouver and 1 km (1 mi) southwest of line parent Spire Peaks. Topographic relief is significant as the summit rises 1,020 meters (3,346 feet) above Eanastick Meadows in 1.5 kilometer (0.9 mile). Precipitation runoff from the peak drains to Skookum Creek, thence Mamquam River. The toponym was officially adopted September 7, 1978, by the Geographical Names Board of Canada.

== Climate ==
Based on the Köppen climate classification, Pyramid Mountain is located in the marine west coast climate zone of western North America. Most weather fronts originate in the Pacific Ocean, and travel east toward the Coast Mountains where they are forced upward by the range (Orographic lift), causing them to drop their moisture in the form of rain or snowfall. As a result, the Coast Mountains experience high precipitation, especially during the winter months in the form of snowfall. Winter temperatures can drop below −20 °C with wind chill factors below −30 °C.

== Gallery ==
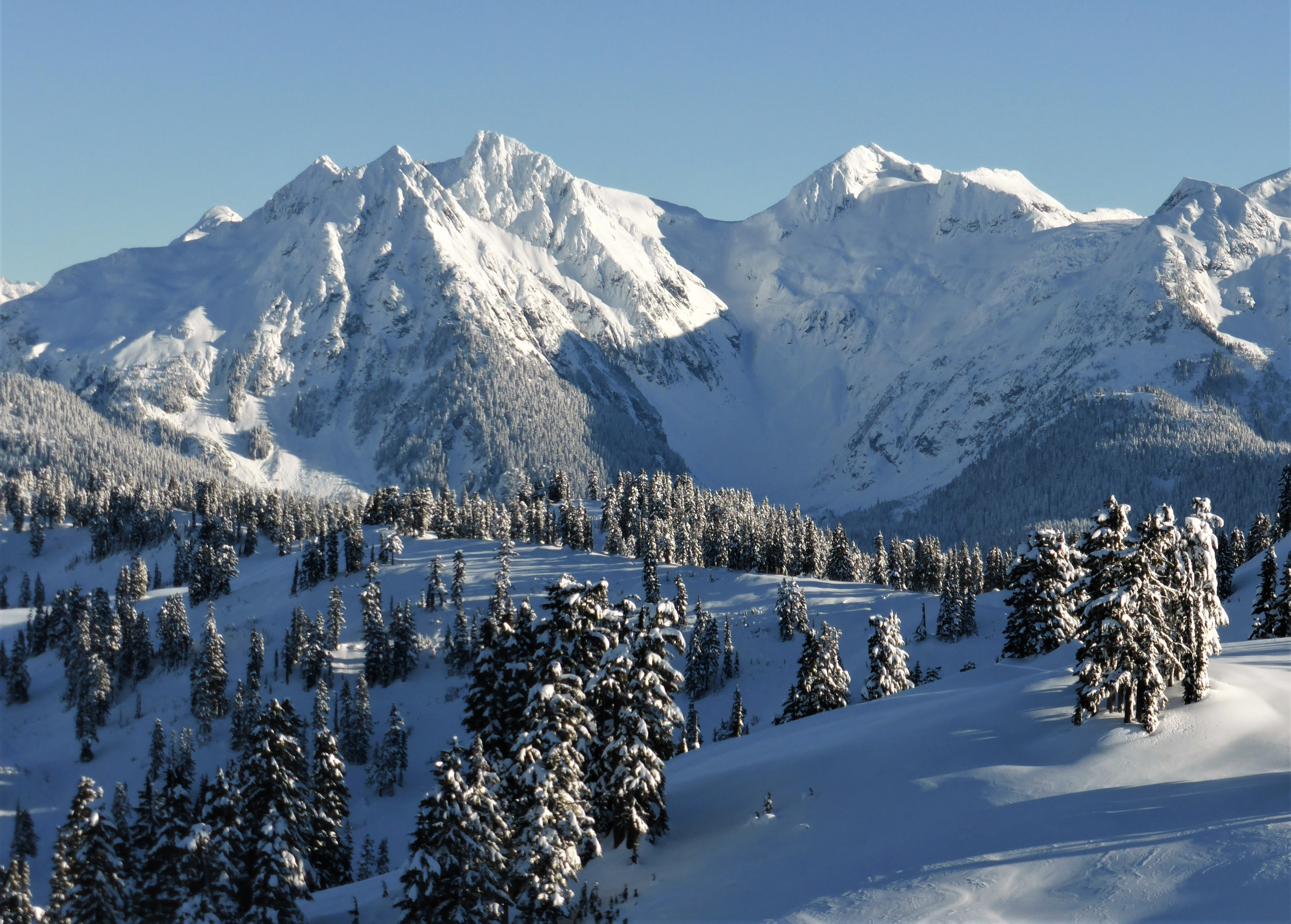
Pyramid Mountain and Spire Peaks to left, Trick Peak (right). Southwest aspect.

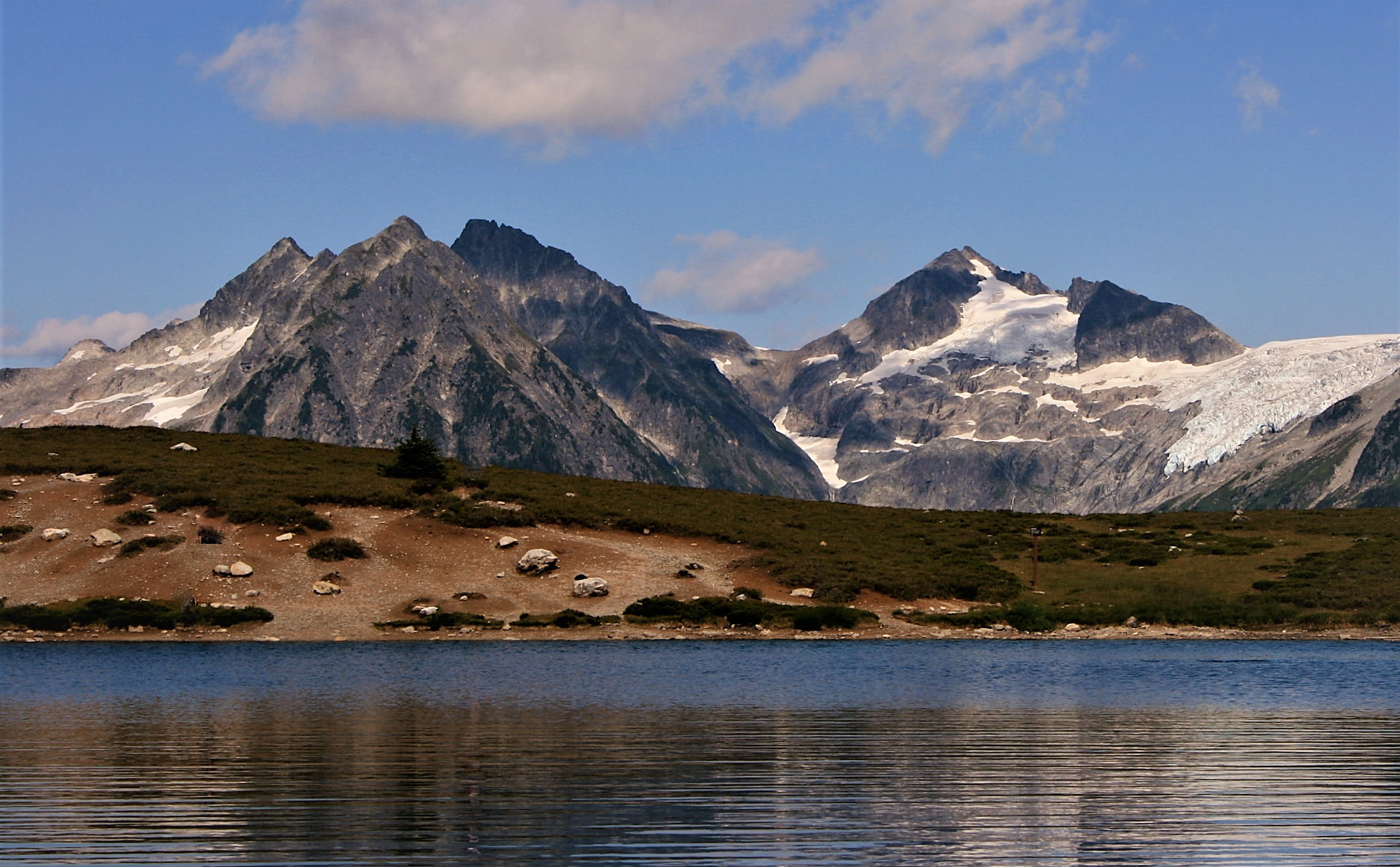
Pyramid Mountain and Spire Peaks to left, Trick Peak (right). From Elfin Lake.

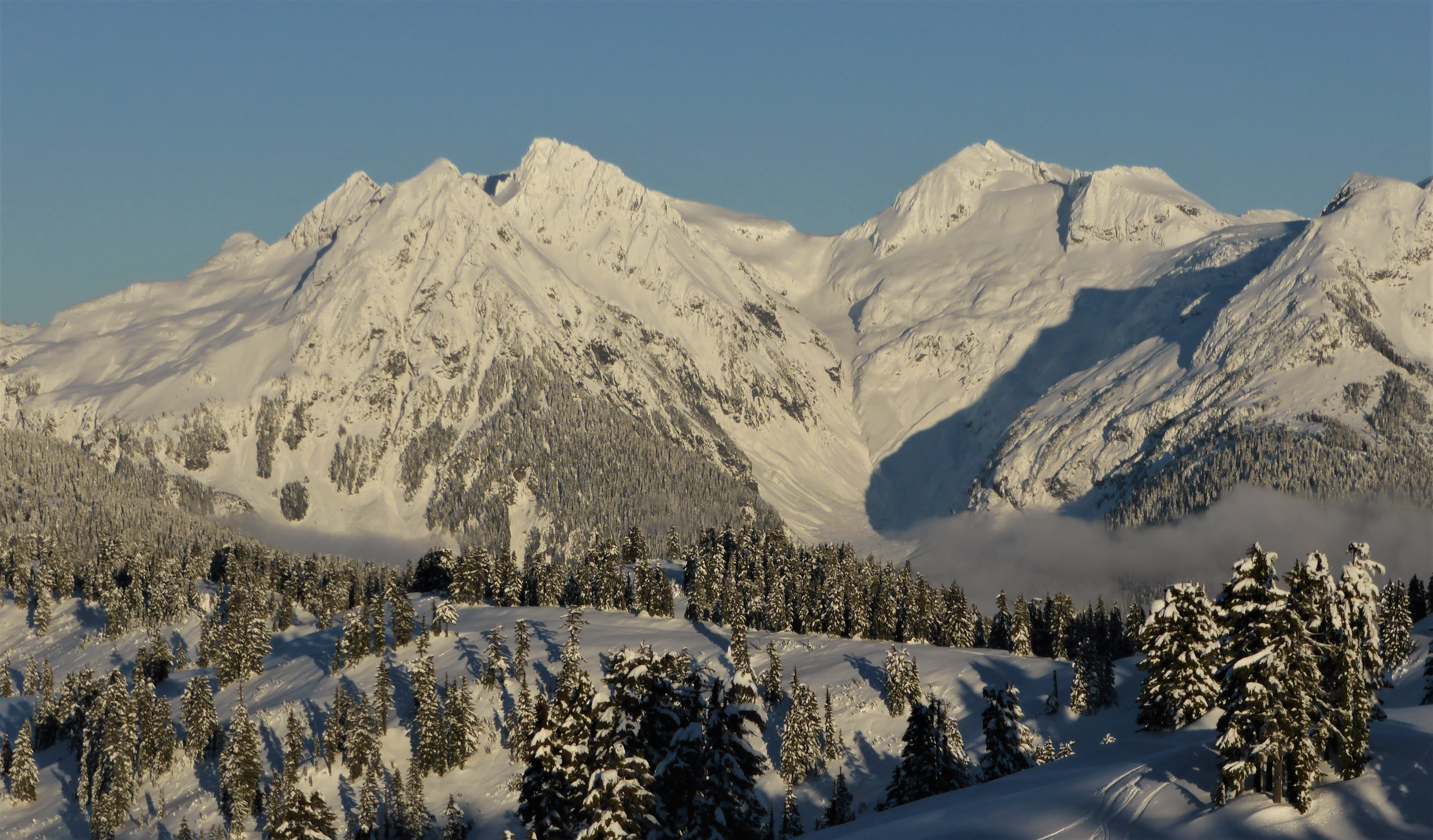
Pyramid Mountain and Spire Peaks to left, Trick Peak (right). Southwest aspect.

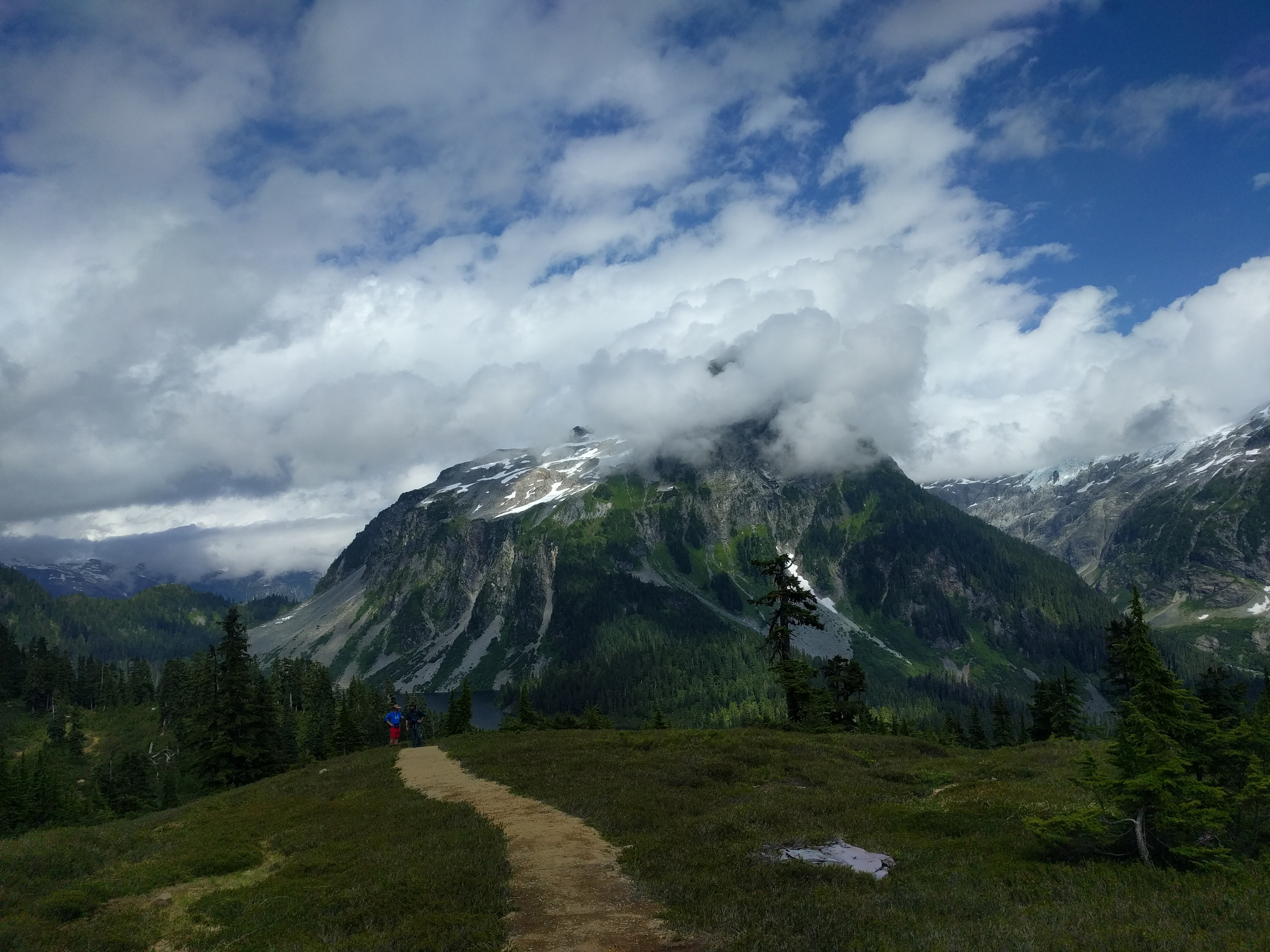
West aspect

== See also ==
- Geography of British Columbia
