= RISE (sculpture) =

Sculpture in Belfast, Northern Ireland

Coordinates: 54.58868°N 5.95854°W

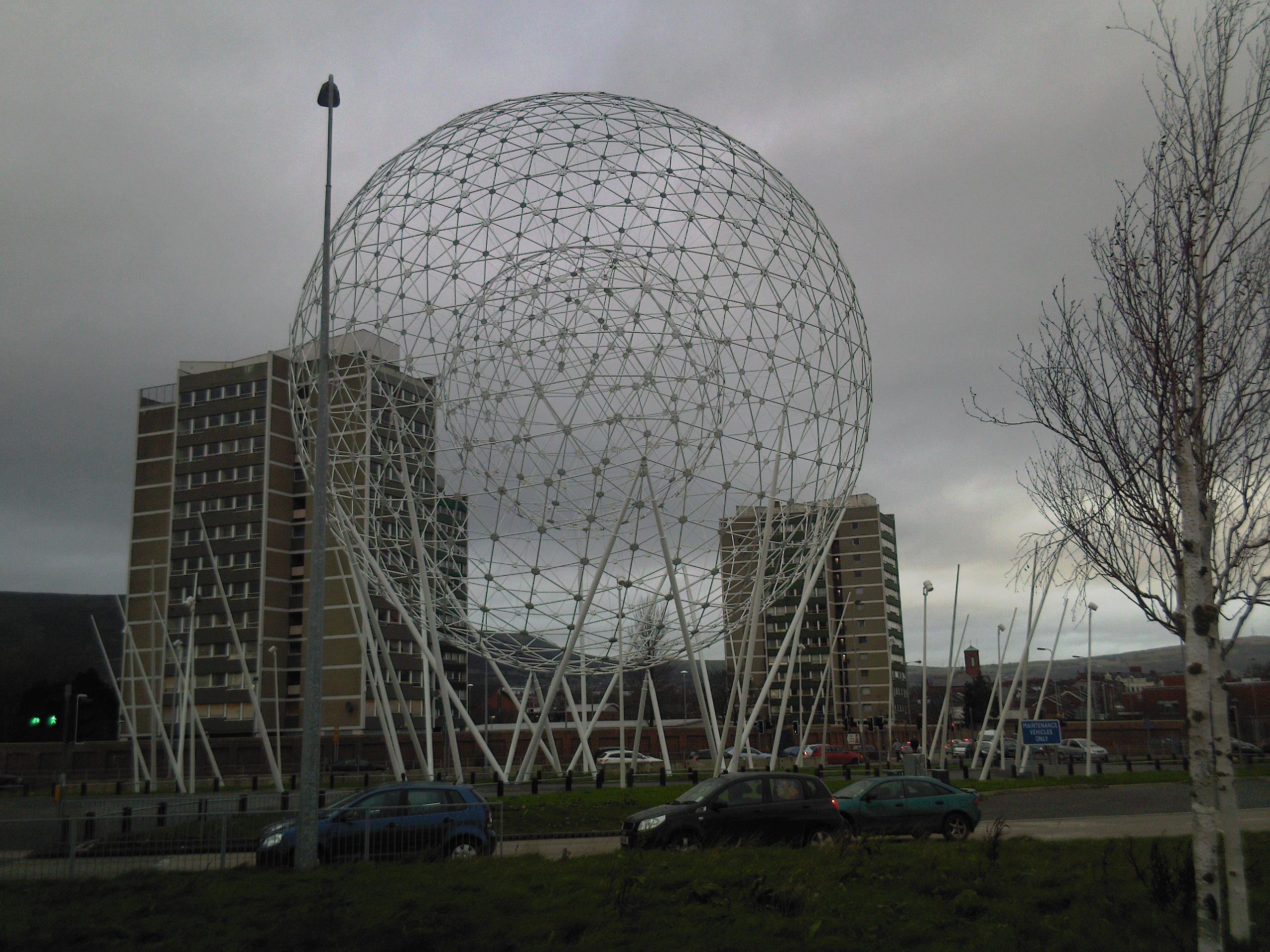
- Artist: Wolfgang Buttress; Engineers: Price & Myers; Contractor: GRAHAM Construction; Steel Fabricator: Hasson and Sons
- Year: 2011
- Type: Steel
- Dimensions: 37.5 m × 30 m (123 ft × 98 ft)
- Location: Belfast, Northern Ireland

RISE is the official name given to the public art sculpture located at Broadway Roundabout in Belfast, Northern Ireland. However, it has been given unofficial, colloquial titles such as the "Balls of the Falls", "the Testes on the Westes" and "the Westicles". These names have been derived by both the sculpture's location on Broadway Junction (located above the A12 Westlink and in close proximity to the Falls Road) and in reference to its shape made from two spherical, metal structures.

The RISE sculpture was designed by Wolfgang Buttress and consists of a geodesic sphere suspended inside a larger, 30 m (98 ft) diameter sphere, standing at an overall height of 37.5 m (123 ft). Geodesic refers to the shortest path between two points on a curve so that in the case of the RISE sculpture, adjacent connections on each of the spheres are connected using straight bars, thereby minimising the distance between two points. At 30m wide and 37.5m tall, RISE is the biggest public art sculpture in Belfast.

RISE was commissioned by Belfast City Council and built in 2011 as part of a multimillion-pound road improvement programme. It now sits atop of the A12 Westlink Underpass (a grade-separated junction) which, according to a 2009 Northern Ireland Assembly report, sees approximately 80,000 cars on average flow past it each day.

== Concept and construction ==
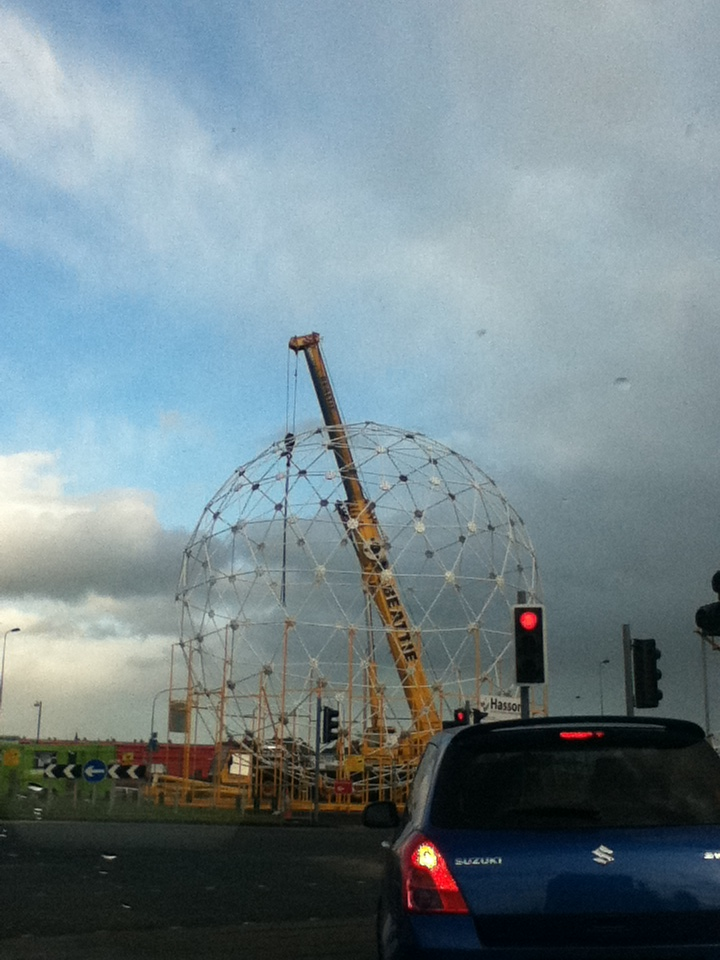
RISE during construction

The globe-shaped, white and silver steel sculpture is a representation of a new sun rising to celebrate a new chapter in the history of Belfast. The inner sphere represents the sun rising over the bogs and the outer sphere represents the sun's halo, while the angled, steel supports are to represent the reeds of the bog meadows that extended more widely across the area before it was developed. Due to Belfast's history of conflict and the location of the Westlink separating some of the city's unionist and nationalist communities, the sculptor noted that it was important to design a sculpture that could be viewed in its 'roundness' from any angle and therefore any political or religious persuasion.

The sculptor encouraged input from local people living near the landmark sculpture, including the holding of creative workshops with groups from the Donegall Road and St James' areas of Belfast.

Belfast City Council coordinated the plans for the new sculpture with strong support and funding from the Department for Social Development (Regeneration Directorate) and the National Lottery, through the Big Lottery Fund, through the Arts Council of Northern Ireland, as well as advice and assistance from the Department for Regional Development Roads Service.

Construction of the piece was challenging.

Work on RISE was due to begin in August 2009 and end in October 2009. However, due to delays the completion date was changed to March 2011. It was finally completed in September 2011, nearly two years behind the original schedule.

== Competition ==
There had been a previous competition and previous winner: Trillian by Ed Carpenter. However, plans were scrapped amid escalating steel costs, which threatened to raise the price of the sculpture, originally agreed at £400,000, to £600,000.

== Cost and funding ==
Originally, the sculpture concept was estimated at a cost of £400,000. This final cost was reported in the region of £486,000, with £330,000 coming from the Department for Social Development, £100,000 coming from the Arts Council of Northern Ireland and £56,000 being supplied by Belfast City Council itself.

== Workshop ==
In October 2009, school children and senior citizens from across Belfast worked with New Belfast Community Arts Initiative, local writers and the artist, Buttress, to look at plans for RISE, and to learn more about creative expression through workshops. The workshops were designed to give people an insight into the process involved in creating the sculpture, to give an opportunity to reflect on what it symbolises for Belfast, and to offer their own creative insights in response.

== See also ==
- Golden (sculpture)
