= Spires (disambiguation) =

A spire is a conical or pyramidal structure tapering at the top of a building.

Spires or The Spires may also refer to:

== Places ==
=== Geography ===
- Speyer (formerly Spires in English), a city in Germany
- The Spires (Tasmania), a mountain range in the South West Wilderness, Tasmania, Australia

=== Buildings and structures ===
- The Spires (Houston), thirty-ninth tallest skyscraper in Houston, Texas completed in 1983
- The Spires, a commercial conference centre, operated out of Church House, Belfast by the Presbyterian Church in Ireland
- The Spires Shopping Centre, a shopping centre in Chipping Barnet, north London, England

== People ==
- Arthur "Big Boy" Spires (1912–1990), an American blues singer and guitarist
- Elizabeth Spires (born 1952), an American poet and university professor
- Greg Spires (born 1974), a former American football defensive end in the National Football League
- Jamie Spires (born 1976), an English cricketer
- Kit Spires (born 1954), an American politician
- Nick Spires (born 1994), an English-Swedish basketball player

== Education ==
- Oxford Spires Academy, a state funded secondary school for children aged 11–18 in Glanville Road, East Oxford
- Spires Academy, a secondary school for students aged 11–16 in Canterbury, Kent
- The Spires College, a mixed secondary school and sixth form located in the Devon town of Torquay, England

== Other uses ==
- SPIRES (Stanford Physics Information Retrieval System}, a database for publications in High-Energy Physics
- Saint Mary Spires, the athletic teams that represent the University of Saint Mary in Leavenworth, Kansas

== See also ==
- Spire (disambiguation)
