= Golden (sculpture) =

Sculpture in Tunstall, England

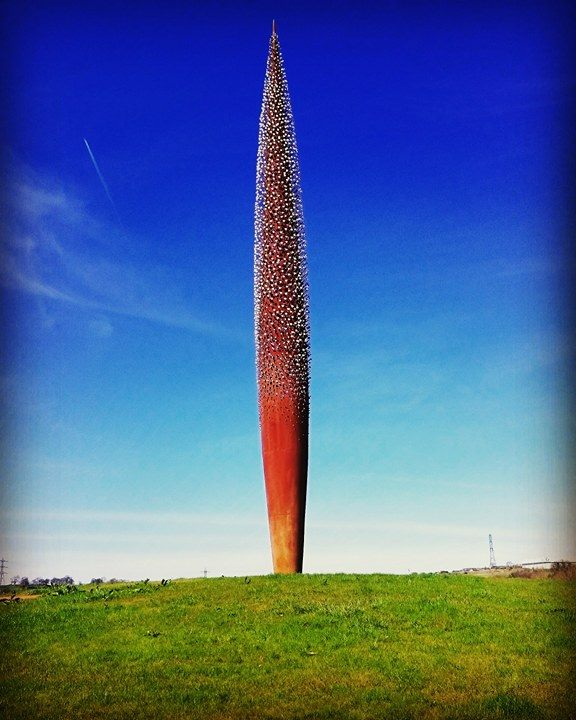
- Artist: Wolfgang Buttress
- Year: 2013
- Type: Stylised flame
- Medium: COR-TEN Steel, LED lights, 1,500 glass prisms
- Dimensions: 21 m × 2.5 m (69 ft × 8.2 ft)
- Location: Tunstall

Golden is a modern art sculpture installed in the Chatterley Valley, on the outskirts of Tunstall, Stoke-on-Trent in May 2015. The £180,000 artwork is installed on the site of the former Goldendale Ironworks and was designed by the award-winning public art sculptor Wolfgang Buttress, who designed the Rise sculpture in Belfast. It is one of the tallest public art sculptures in Britain. The site was previously occupied by the Potteries Pyramid, which has been erroneously placed there since 2007.

== Funding ==
The sculpture was privately funded using £180,000 of Section 106 monies set aside to provide new public art or maintain current public art in the area. The money was secured following the construction of the Blue Planet eco-warehouse built by construction firm Glazeley further along the Chatterley Valley, in the neighbouring borough of Newcastle-under-Lyme. Stoke-on-Trent city council put the project out to tender in February 2011 and a number of designs were put forward.

== Design ==
The 69 ft (21m) sculpture is made from COR-TEN Steel, the same material as the Angel of the North and was fabricated in Nottingham. A stylized map of Sutherland is engraved on the sculpture and highlights the topography of Chatterley Valley. The tapered lozenge design, shaped to evoke a solitary flame such as lit the Chatterley Valley during the heyday of the Iron Works, features powerful colour changing LED lights that illuminate 1,500 hand blown glass prisms containing wishes or memories of local residents written on handmade paper. Each prism is held out from the main body of the sculpture by a short stalk, giving the artwork a bristly appearance. Local arts group Letting In The Light was commissioned by artist Wolfgang Buttress to collect the wishes and memories. Although people cannot see the messages while the sculpture is installed, the Letting in the Light previously planned to publish them in an accompanying book. While visiting the sculpture, Buttress found a piece of iron from the old iron works that resembled a human heart. This iron piece now hangs inside the sculpture to represent the community's heartbeat.

== See also ==
- Angel of the North
- Dream sculpture
- Rise sculpture
