= Wolfgang Buttress =

English artist

- Born: 1965 (age 60–61)
- Occupation: Artist

Wolfgang Buttress (born 1965) is an English artist. He creates multi-sensory artworks that draw inspiration from our evolving relationship with the natural world. Buttress explores and interprets scientific discoveries, collaborating with architects, landscape architects, scientists and musicians to create human-centred experiences.

== Biography ==
Buttress was brought up in Birmingham and Cumbria and currently lives in and works from a studio in Nottingham.

Receiving his early education in Cumbria, including an arts foundation course, Buttress took a fine arts degree at Nottingham Trent.

On 1 July 2019, he appeared on the podcast Trees A Crowd with David Oakes and his long term collaborator, Dr Martin Bencsik.

== Work ==
Buttress has produced artworks on four continents including Europe, Australia, Japan and the U.S. He is well known for the UK Pavilion (Milan EXPO 2015) and The Hive, a collaboration with physicist Dr Martin Bencsik, BDP, Hoare Lea and Simmonds Studio, currently installed at Royal Botanic Gardens, Kew, London, England. The project has won over 25 awards including the gold medal for best in show at the 2015 Expo in Milan.

The Hive is a 17 metre aluminium lattice cuboid that highlights the decline of the honey bee. By measuring the activity of a living bee colony at Kew Gardens, accelerometers feed live signals to 1000 LED lights which line the interior of the sculpture. The energy informs an ever-changing and fluid soundscape created by a selected ensemble of musicians who now write and perform under the name of BE.

RISE is a large spherical public art work in Belfast.

Other scientific collaborations include UNA (2013), in Canberra, Australia and Lucent (2015), in Chicago, both these project express the star mapping research of astrophysicist Dr Daniel Bayliss. Corona (2017) is a collaboration with Dr Martin Bencsik; two NASA satellites monitor the sun's activity which is expressed in real time as an ever-changing light array onto a 1,000m^{2} façade of the new science research hub in Nottingham, England.

Current projects include sculptures in Taiwan, the US, Australia and the United Kingdom.

== Selected works ==
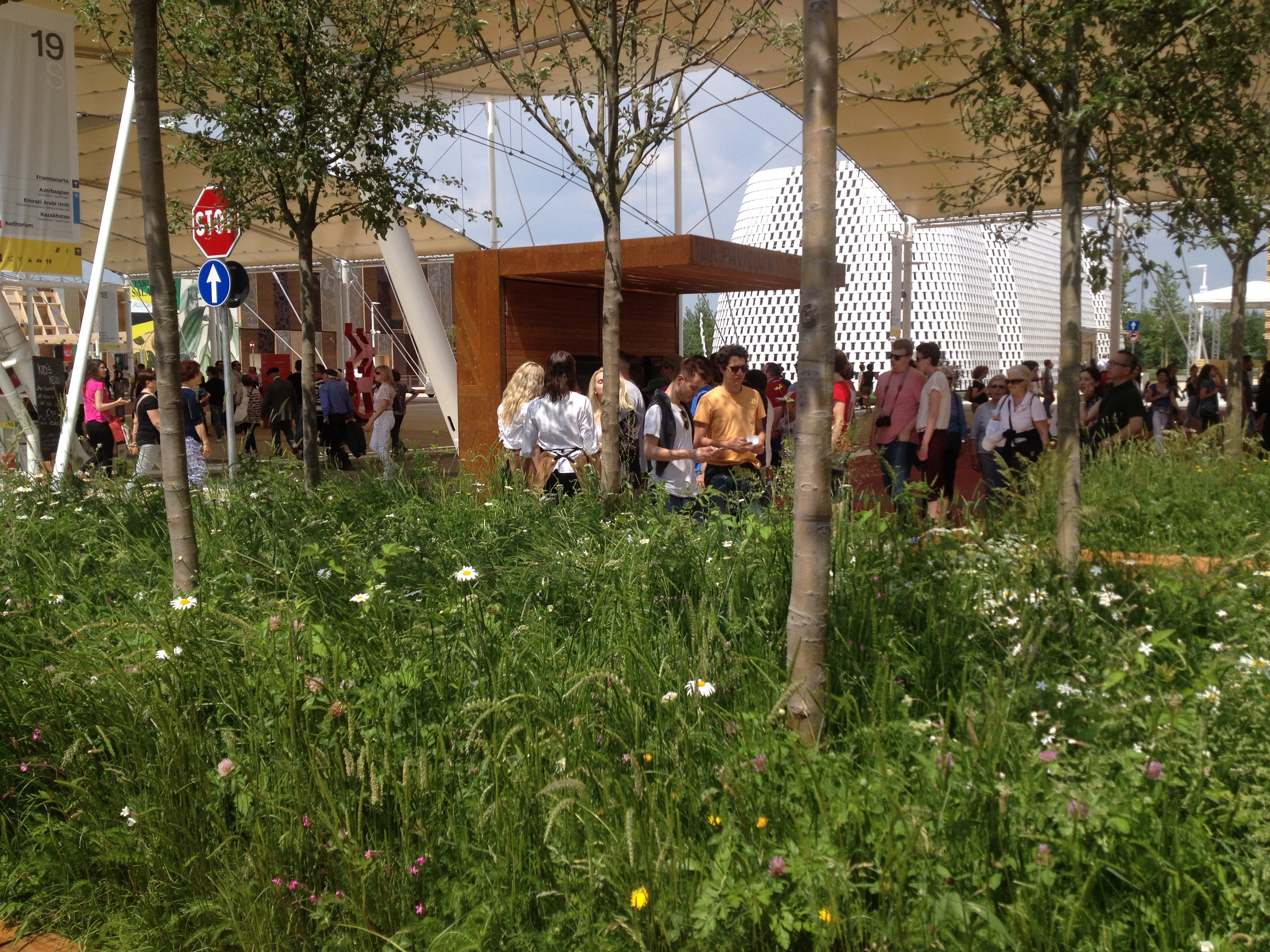
Outside the UK pavilion designed by Wolfgang Buttress

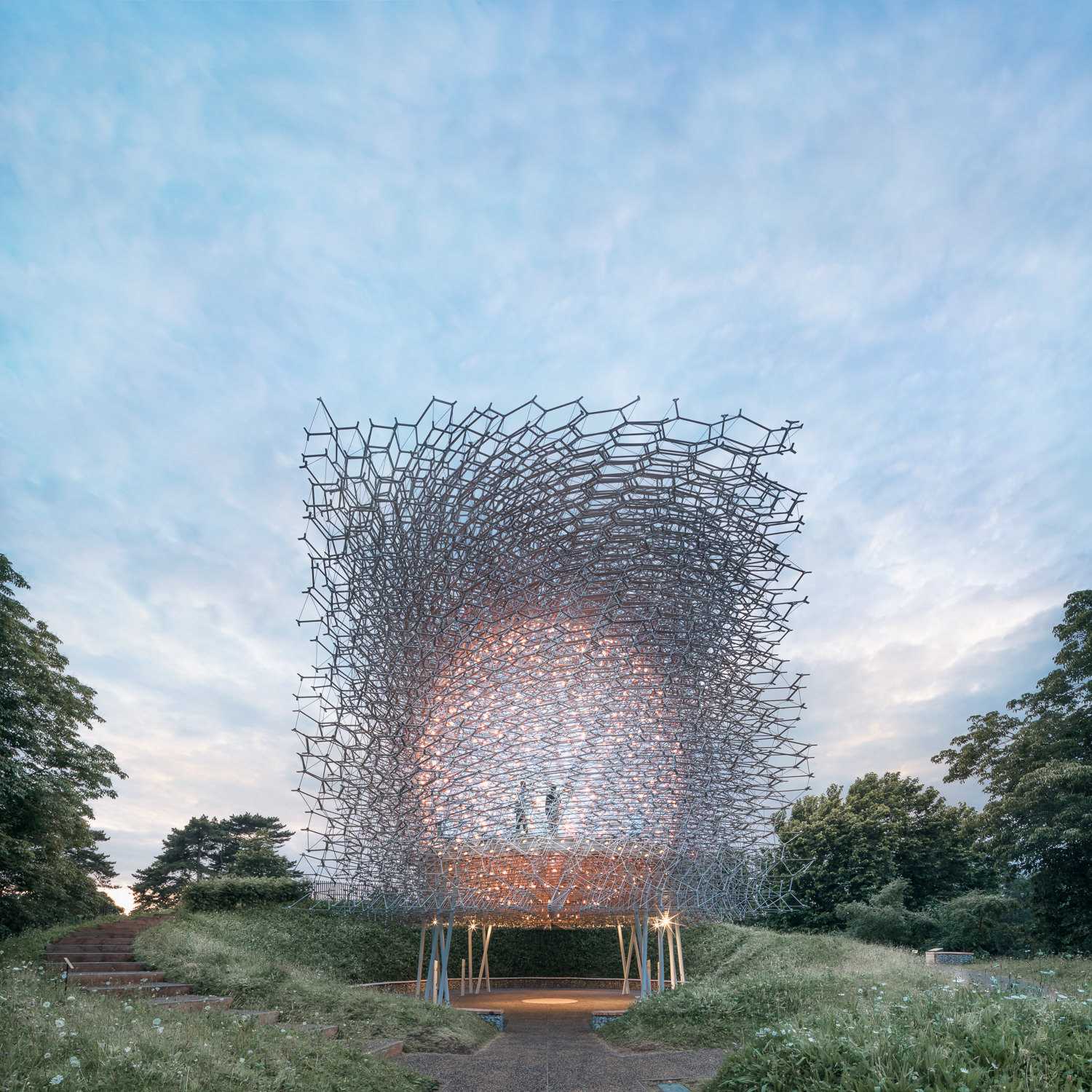

Notable Works Include:

- Rise Belfast
- A Spire for Mansfield
- Golden in Stoke-on-Trent
- UK Pavilion Milan Expo 2015"
- Angel Wings, Islington
- Lucent. Chicago
- The Hive at Kew, Royal Botanic Gardens, Kew, London
