= Speier =

Speier is a surname. Notable people with the surname include:

- Chris Speier (born 1950), baseball player and coach
- Gabe Speier (born 1995), American baseball player
- Hans Speier (1905-1990), German-American sociologist
- Hermine Speier (1898-1989), German archaeologist
- Jackie Speier (born 1950), Democratic congresswoman from California
- Justin Speier (born 1973), baseball player
- Ryan Speier (born 1979), baseball player

== See also ==
- Speyer (disambiguation)
