= Hunter Hackett =

American politician

Member of the South Carolina House of Representatives from the 96th district
- Incumbent
- Assumed office November 9, 2026
- Preceded by: Ryan McCabe

Personal details
- Party: Republican
- Website: Campaign website

Hunter Hackett is an American politician. A member of the Republican Party, he is the member for the 96th district of the South Carolina House of Representatives. He was elected at the 2026 election.
