= Ryan McCabe =

American politician

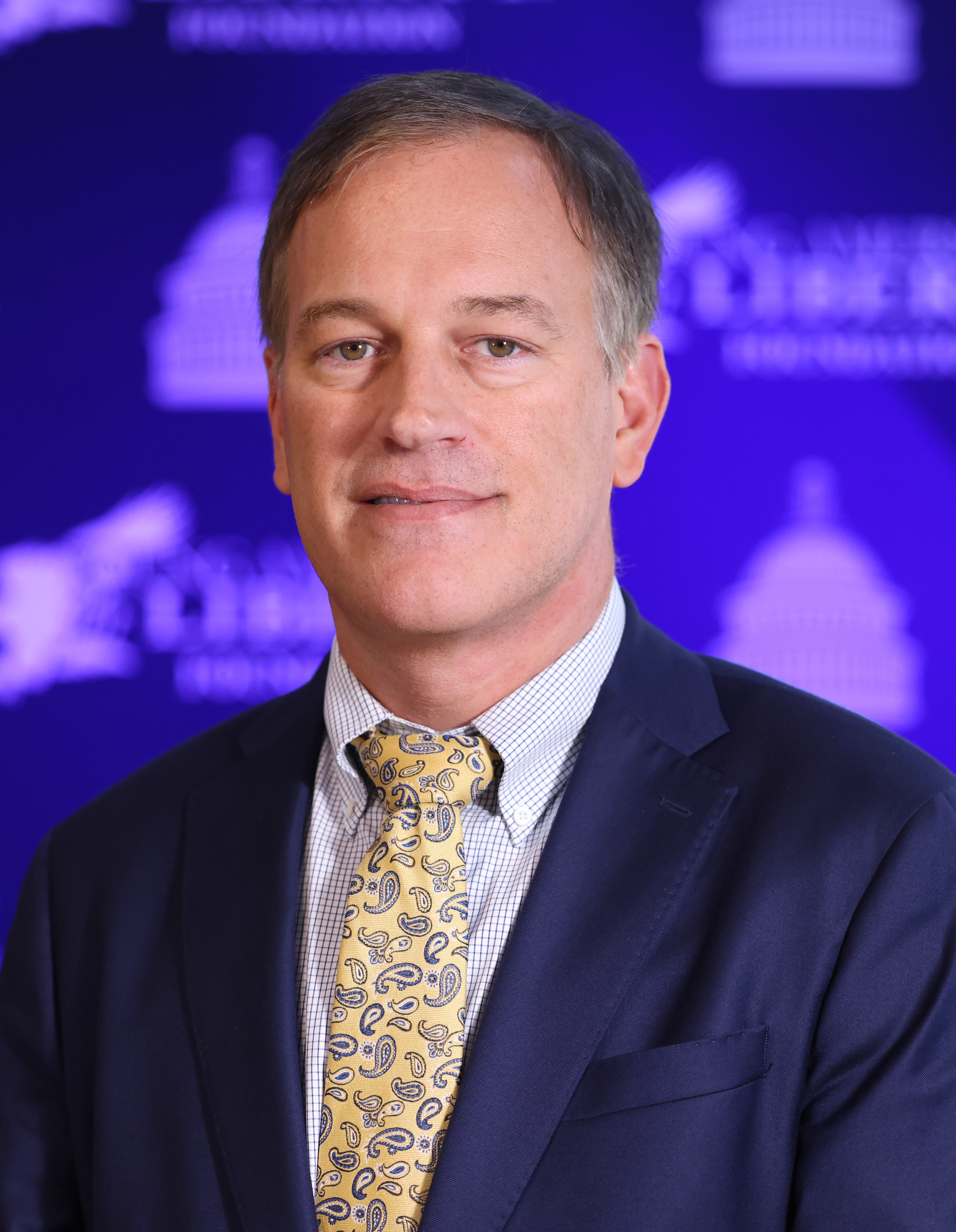
- McCabe at the 2024 Hazlitt Summit hosted by Young Americans for Liberty Foundation

Member of the South Carolina House of Representatives from the 96th district
- In office November 9, 2020 – November 9, 2026
- Preceded by: Kit Spires
- Succeeded by: Hunter Hackett

Personal details
- Born: April 9, 1973 (age 53) Columbia, South Carolina
- Party: Republican
- Spouse: Jennifer Moore (m. 2000)
- Children: 5
- Education: Newberry College (B.A.); Campbell University (J.D.)
- Profession: attorney and farmer

Donald Ryan McCabe Jr. is an American attorney and politician. He is a member of the South Carolina House of Representatives from the 96th District, serving since 2020. He is a member of the Republican party.

McCabe is a member of the South Carolina Freedom Caucus. He also serves on the House Agriculture, Natural Resources & Environmental Affairs and the Regulations and Administrative Procedures Committees.

McCabe has a ranking of #1 by the American Conservative Union.
