= The Spire (Graham Land) =

Isolated rock pinnacle in Antarctica

The Spire (68°18′S 66°53′W) is an isolated rock pinnacle at the northwest end of the Blackwall Mountains on the south side of Neny Fjord, Graham Land in Antarctica. It was probably first seen by the British Graham Land Expedition (BGLE) sledging parties in 1936–37, though not specifically mapped. The first ascent was on 17 January 1948, by members of Falkland Islands Dependencies Survey (FIDS) and Ronne Antarctic Research Expedition (RARE). The name was first used in 1949 by William Latady, aerial photographer with RARE.
