= Kit Spires =

American politician

Member of the South Carolina House of Representatives from the 96th district
- In office 2007 – November 8, 2020
- Succeeded by: Ryan McCabe

Personal details
- Born: February 23, 1954 (age 72) Columbia, South Carolina, U.S.
- Party: Republican

Lawrence Kit Spires (born February 23, 1954) is an American politician. He is a former member of the South Carolina House of Representatives from the 96th District, serving from 2007 to 2020. He is a member of the Republican party.
