= Spire (Seattle building) =

Residential skyscraper in Seattle, Washington

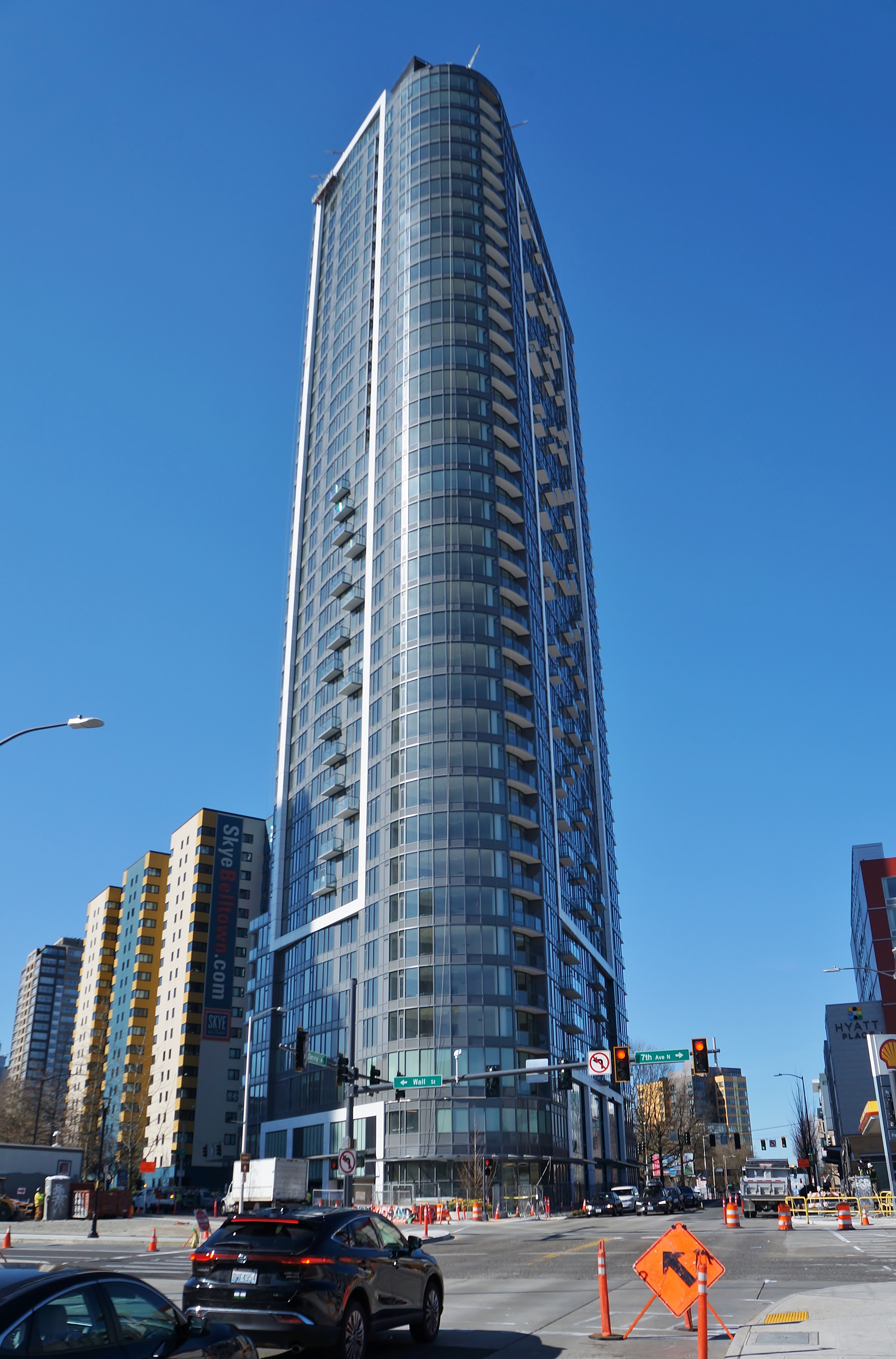
- Under construction in March 2021
- Interactive map of the Spire area
- Former names: Icon Tower

General information
- Status: Completed
- Type: Residential
- Location: 600 Wall Street; Seattle, Washington, U.S.
- Coordinates: 47°37′06″N 122°20′40″W
- Construction started: June 2018
- Opened: August 2021
- Cost: $200 million

Height
- Architectural: 440 ft (130 m)

Technical details
- Floor count: 41

Design and construction
- Architecture firm: VIA Architecture
- Developer: Laconia Development; Vanke
- Main contractor: PCL Construction

Other information
- Number of units: 343 condominiums
- Parking: 266 spaces

Website
- spireseattle.com

Spire is a 41-story residential skyscraper in the Belltown neighborhood of Seattle, Washington, United States. The 440-foot (130 m) building sits in a triangular block adjacent to the intersection of Denny Way and Wall Street, roughly between the Belltown and Denny Triangle neighborhoods. It has 343 condominiums, retail space, and a rooftop terrace. The building has an automated parking system in its underground garage with capacity for 266 vehicles.

The project was originally proposed in 2006 as the Icon Tower by a Californian developer, but was put on hold during the economic recession two years later. It was revived in 2013 and underwent additional design changes under a new architect and with investment from Chinese developer Vanke. It was re-branded as Spire and began construction in 2018; the building was completed in 2021.

== History ==
The 10,665-square-foot (990.8 m^{2}) triangular site at Denny Way and Wall Street was part of the area re-zoned by the city in 2006 for slim residential buildings with heights of up to 400 feet (120 m). San Francisco-based Levin Menzies announced plans for a 34-story "Vancouver-style" condominium tower, named the Icon Tower, prior to the zoning change being passed by the city council. The site was occupied by a surface parking lot that was purchased by the developer in 2007 for $4.4 million.

The Icon Tower was shortened from 440 feet (130 m) to 290 feet (88 m) by moving most of its parking underground, in response to feedback from the city's design review board and the neighborhood council. Under the plan, the 32-story building would have 224 condominiums and 10 stories of parking controlled by an automated parking system. The design from Weber Thompson featured a "halo" around its rooftop resembling part of the nearby Space Needle. The city's design review board approved its design in 2007 and Levin Menzies planned to begin construction the following year, but put plans on hold due to the economic recession despite a switch to apartments.

Levin Menzies, re-branded as Laconia Development, chose to prioritize development of an apartment tower on First Hill near Freeway Park before resuming work on the Icon Tower project. In September 2013, Laconia filed updated design plans from Kwan Henmi Architecture with the city, proposing a 39-story tower with 310 units and automated parking for 284 vehicles and 155 bicycles. The updated design removed the "halo" from the rooftop and added several floors of above-ground parking to compensate for the shallow State Route 99 tunnel, which runs under the site. Further design revisions under VIA Architecture replaced the parking system with a valet-operated car elevator and converted the project into apartments, averaging 820 square feet (76 m^{2}) per unit. Following city approval, Laconia planned to begin construction in late 2015 or early 2016.

In May 2016, Seattle mayor Ed Murray announced that the $200 million project would be partially financed by Vanke, the largest residential developer in China. Vanke's interest in the project was spurred by a state visit by Chinese president Xi Jinping to Seattle in September 2015. Later that year, the project was granted its master-use permit by the city and Laconia sold the property to another equity partner for $17.3 million. The city granted a shoring and excavation permit for the project in March 2018, shortly before the expiration of the master-use permit, allowing for pre-construction activities to begin.

On June 19, 2018, Laconia and Vanke broke ground on the tower, re-branded as "Spire" and consisting of 352 condominiums. The condominiums, ranging in price from $450,000 to $5 million, were marketed by Sotheby's International Realty. Contractor PCL Construction began work on the site later that month. Presales began in December 2020, with prices ranging from $485,000 for one-bedroom units to $4 million for larger units. Spire was opened in August 2021, with move-ins for the first residents.

== Design ==
Spire is located on a triangular, 10,665-square-foot (990.8 m^{2}) lot bounded to the north by Denny Way, to the southwest by 6th Avenue, and the southeast by Wall Street. The 41-story tower has 343 condominiums, ranging in size from 520 square feet (48 m^{2}) on lower floors to 3,000 square feet (280 m^{2}) in the upper penthouse levels. The top two floors are home to the "Spire Club", an amenity space with indoor entertainment areas and an outdoor terrace. At street level, the building has 2,000 square feet (190 m^{2}) of retail space and access to eight levels of underground parking with capacity for 266 vehicles. VIA Architects, the last of three firms that worked on the project, took inspiration for its design from the nearby Insignia Towers and Via6 Towers, as well as the Amazon headquarters campus.

The building's parking garage uses an automated elevator system due to the State Route 99 tunnel, which runs under the site. The parking system, designed by Parkworks, uses a system of dollies on rails to carry vehicles from the three elevators to the stalls. It takes three minutes to retrieve a car that is requested using a card reader in the basement level.
