= Spire Peaks =

Mountain in the country of Canada

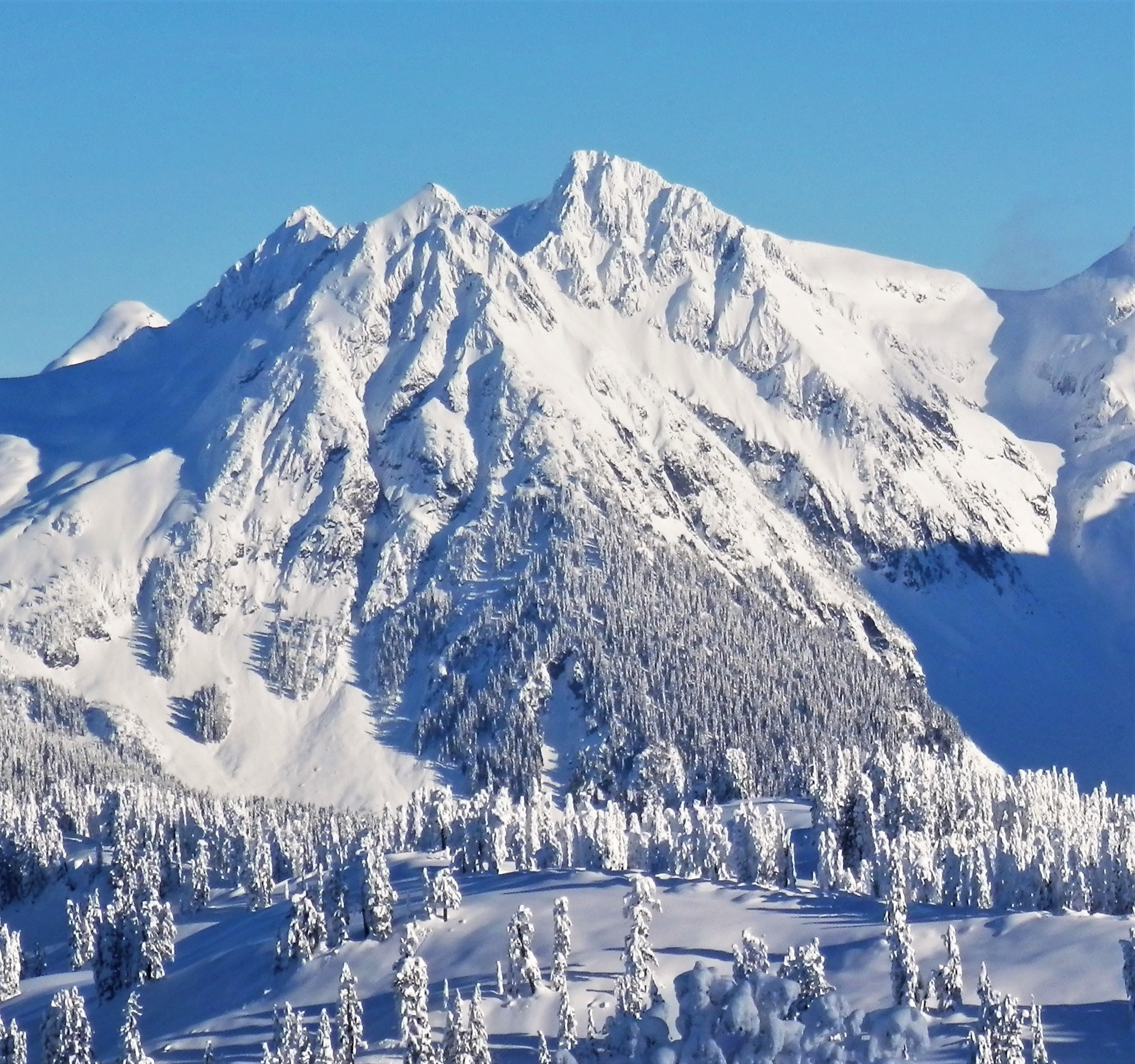
- Spire Peaks (southwest aspect)

Highest point
- Elevation: 2,279 m (7,477 ft)
- Prominence: 208 m (682 ft)
- Parent peak: Mamquam Mountain (2,588m)
- Isolation: 4.34 km (2.70 mi)
- Listing: Mountains of British Columbia
- Coordinates: 49°49′27″N 122°53′15″W

Geography
- Location within British Columbia Location within Canada
- Interactive map of Spire Peaks
- Country: Canada
- Province: British Columbia
- District: New Westminster Land District
- Protected area: Garibaldi Provincial Park
- Parent range: Garibaldi Ranges; Coast Mountains
- Topo map: NTS 92G15 Mamquam Mountain

Climbing
- First ascent: 1913 Don Munday

Spire Peaks is a 2,279-metre (7,477-foot) mountain located in British Columbia, Canada.

== Description ==
Spire Peaks is set within Garibaldi Provincial Park and is part of the Garibaldi Ranges of the Coast Mountains. It is situated 55 km (34 mi) north of Vancouver and 6 km (4 mi) north-northwest of line parent Mamquam Mountain, with the Mamquam Icefield between the two. The southwest summit has an elevation of 2,279 meters and the northeast peak is 2,245 meters, and they are separated 500 meters apart. Topographic relief is significant as the north aspect rises 1,280 meters (4,200 feet) in two kilometers (1.2 mile). Precipitation runoff and glacial meltwater from the north side of the peak drains to Pitt River, and the southern slope drains to Skookum Creek, thence Mamquam River.

== History ==
The first ascent of the summit was made July 22, 1913, by Don Munday and Ben Hanafin. Don would write a poem about the climb, Spire Peak—First Ascent, and recall that the rocks "were as hot as a stove." The toponym was officially adopted March 9, 1979, by the Geographical Names Board of Canada.

== Climate ==
Based on the Köppen climate classification, Spire Peaks is located in the marine west coast climate zone of western North America. Most weather fronts originate in the Pacific Ocean, and travel east toward the Coast Mountains where they are forced upward by the range (Orographic lift), causing them to drop their moisture in the form of rain or snowfall. As a result, the Coast Mountains experience high precipitation, especially during the winter months in the form of snowfall. Winter temperatures can drop below −20 °C with wind chill factors below −30 °C. This climate supports the Spire Glacier on the northeast slope.

== Gallery ==
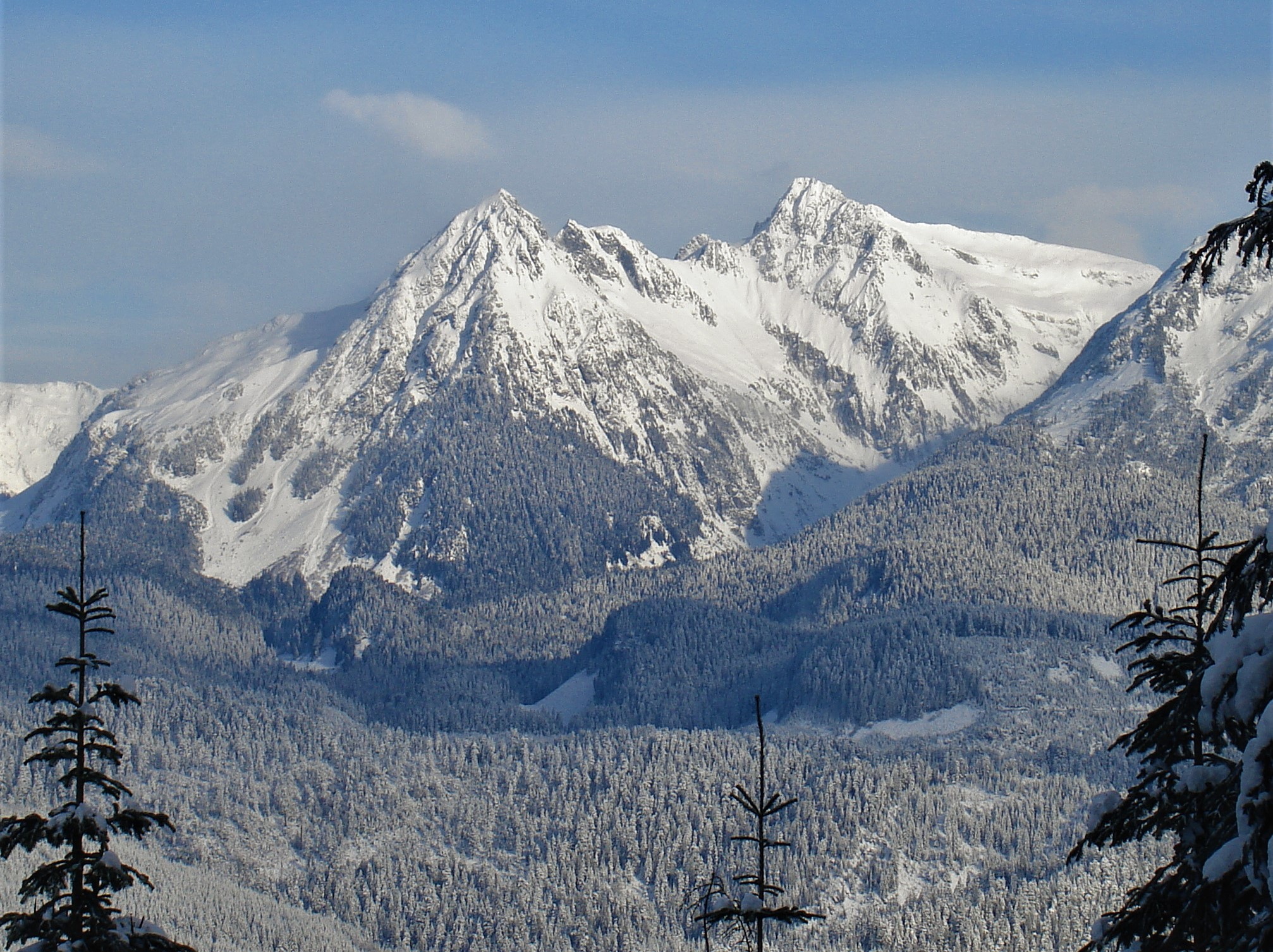
Pyramid Mountain (left), Spire Peaks (right), south aspect

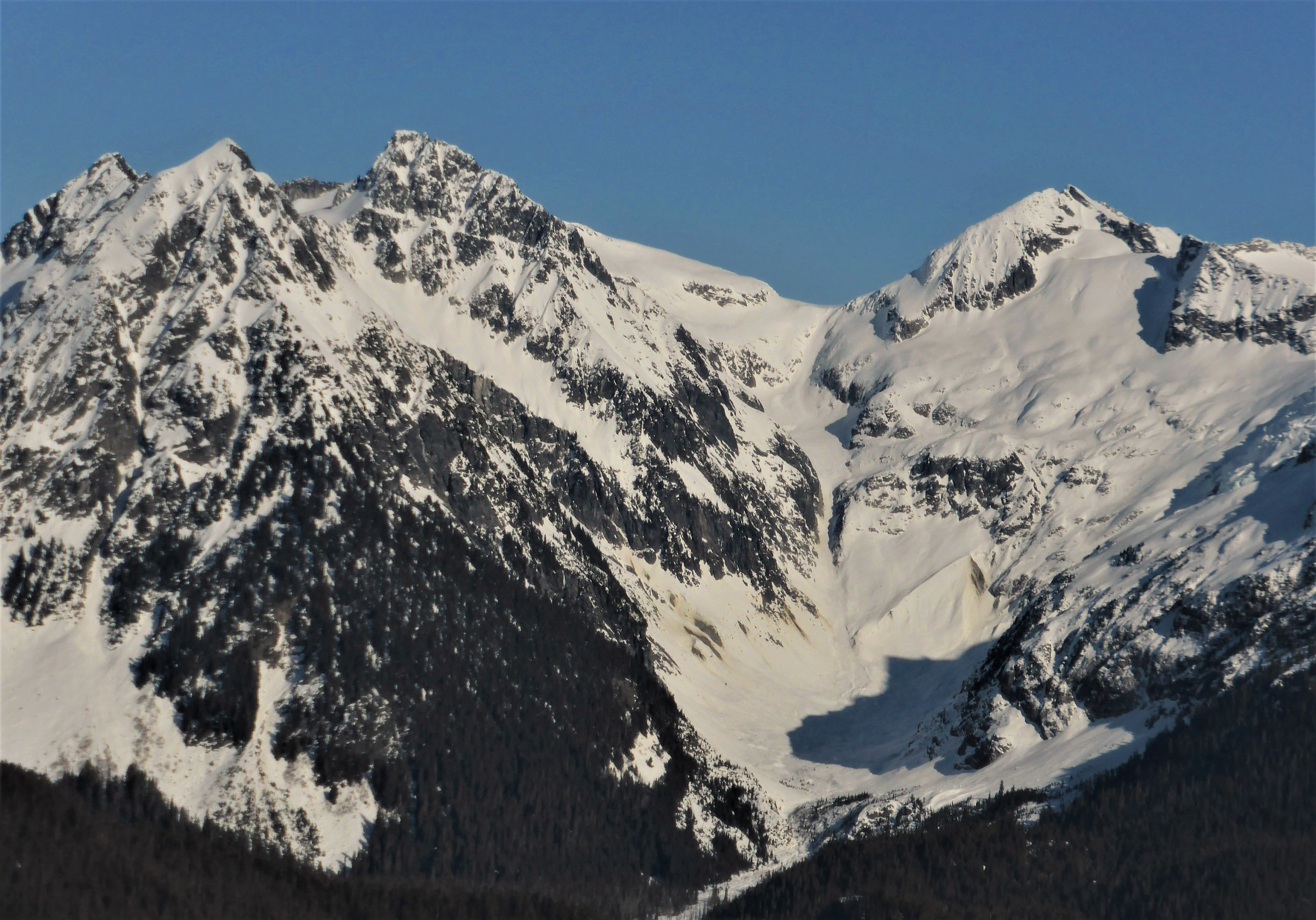
Pyramid Mountain (left), Spire Peaks (left of center), Trick Peak (right)

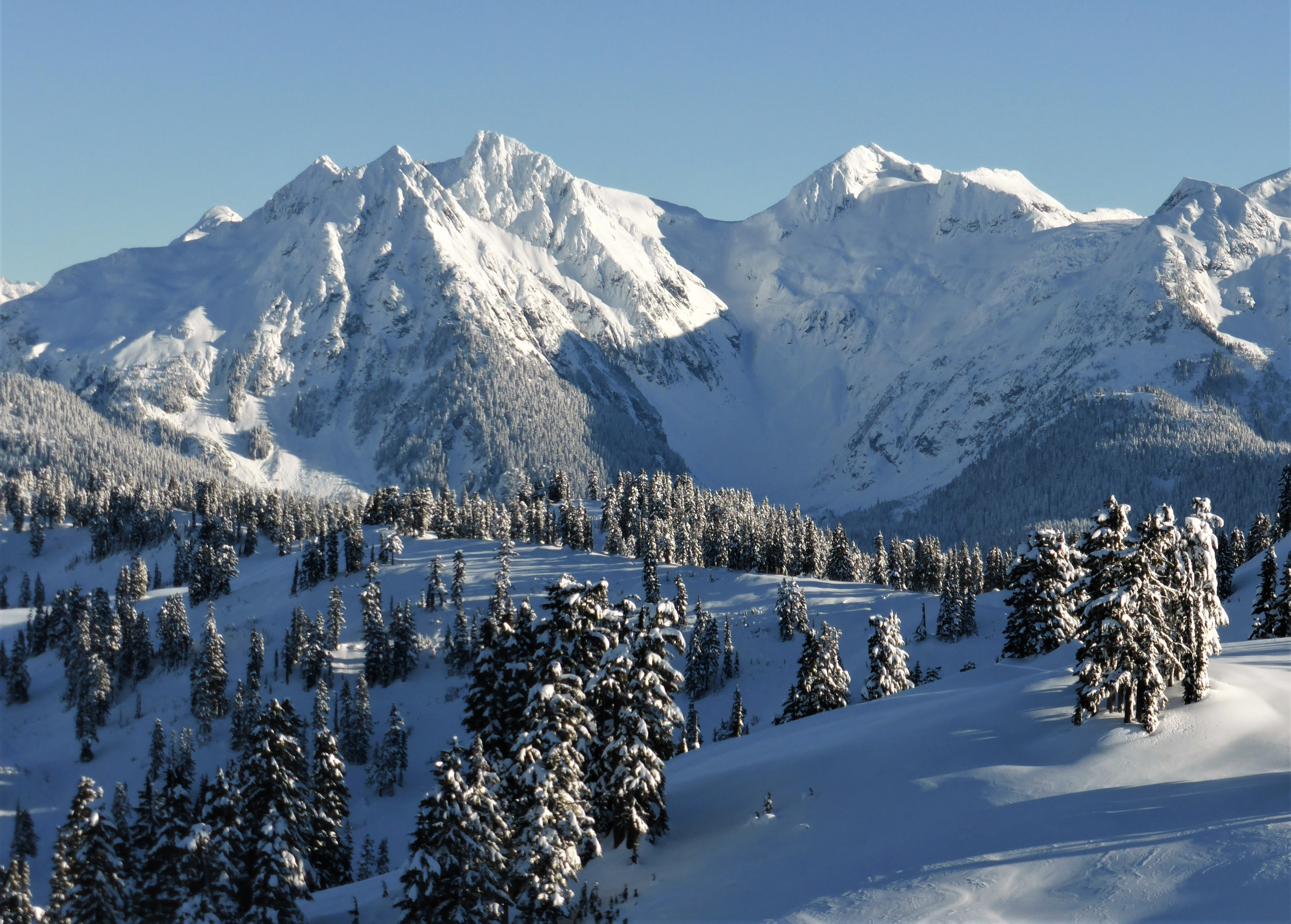
Pyramid Mountain and Spire Peaks to left, Trick Peak (right). Southwest aspect.

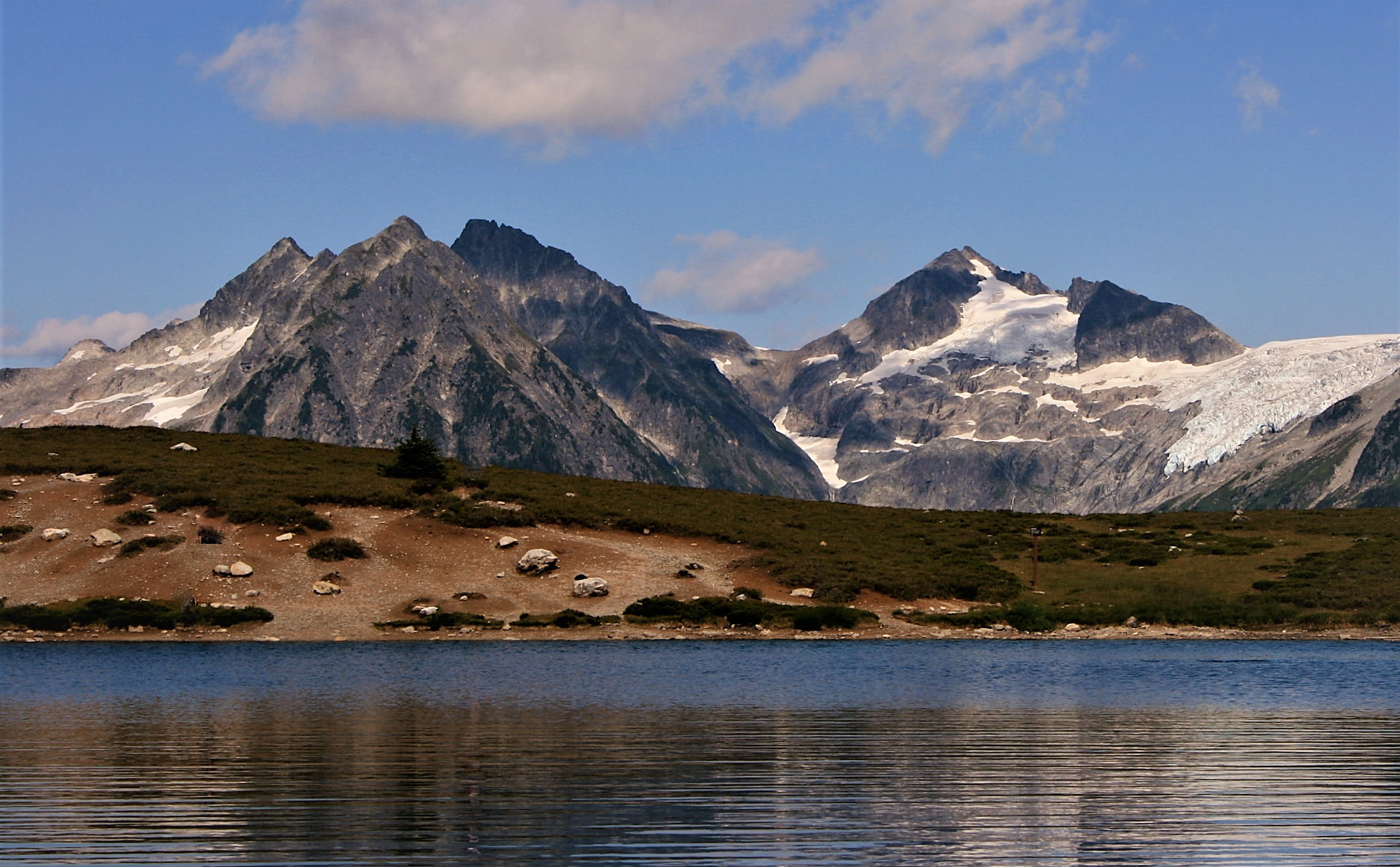
Pyramid Mountain and Spire Peaks to left, Trick Peak (right). From Elfin Lake.

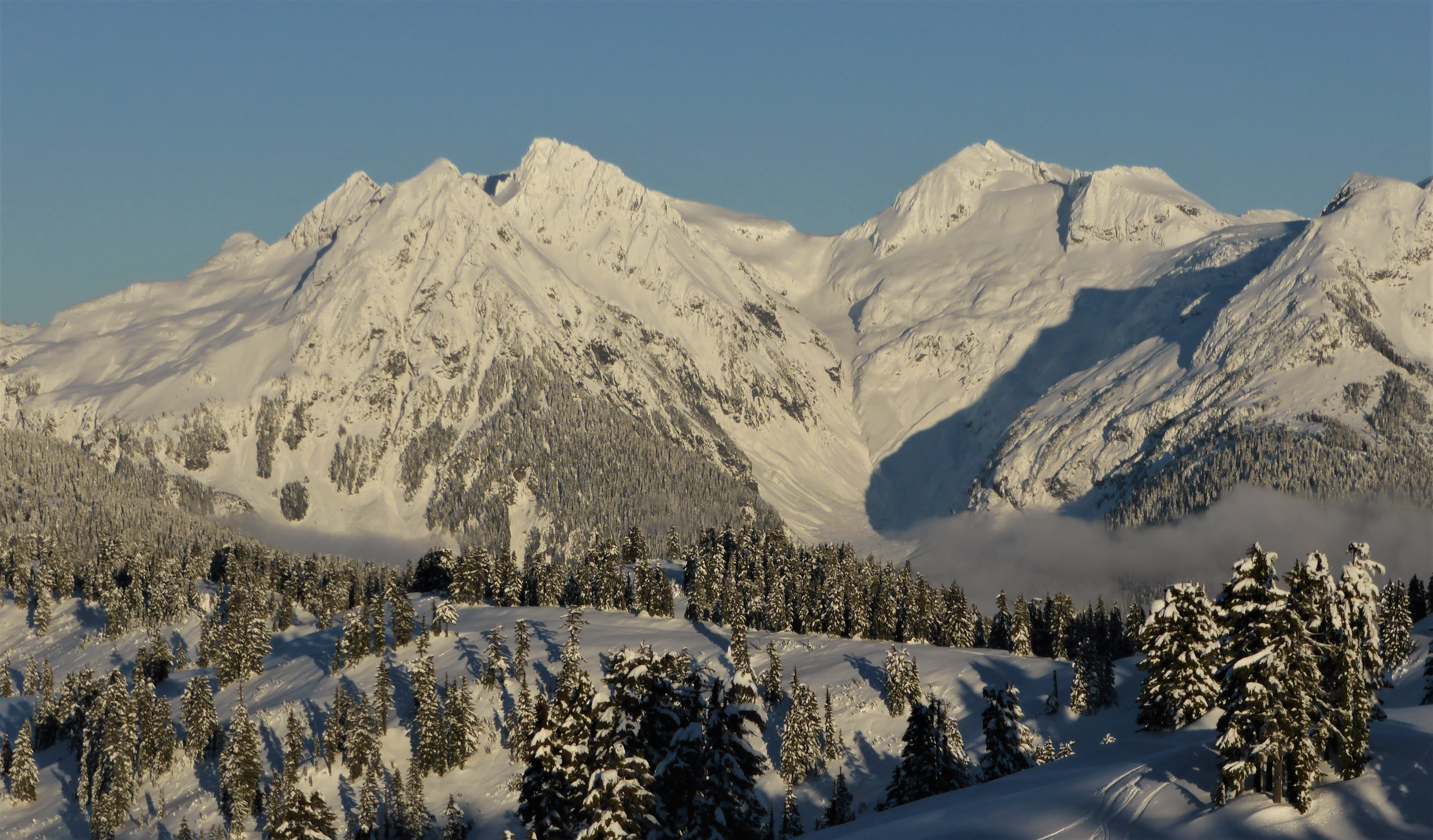
Pyramid Mountain and Spire Peaks to left, Trick Peak (right). Southwest aspect.

== See also ==
- Geography of British Columbia
