= A Spire for Mansfield =

Former modern sculpture in Mansfield town centre

Coordinates: 53.14735°N 1.19986°W

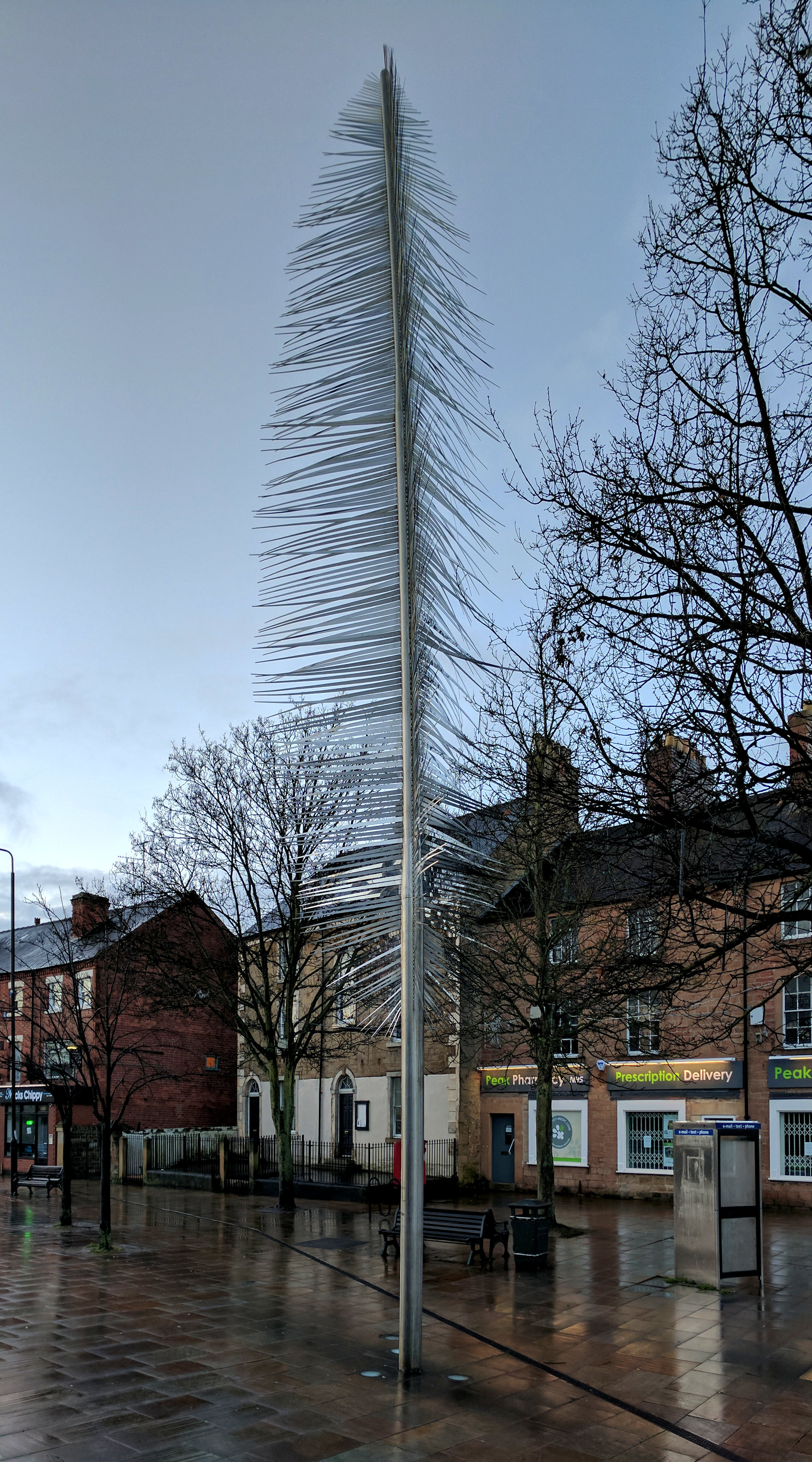
The Spire for Mansfield, on West Gate, Mansfield during 2017

A Spire for Mansfield, also shortened to A-Spire was a 43 ft (13 m) sculpture appearing as a large metallic feather at the edge of the town centre of Mansfield, Nottinghamshire, England. It was officially endorsed by the then-mayor, Tony Egginton, and Mansfield District Council. The sculpture was installed in 2007 as the third piece of public artwork in Mansfield during a sequence, and was removed in 2024 on safety grounds.

== Background ==
The sculpture was created by two artists; Wolfgang Buttress and Heron, and was intended to mark the legacy of local coal mining, the canaries once taken underground, Sherwood Forest in Nottinghamshire, and Mansfield's engineering traditions.

The tines of the feather were cut by laser from 3mm stainless steel and were meant to "capture the breeze" and allow the sculpture to gently sway, portraying the branches of a tree. The highly polished stainless steel aimed to reflect the light and act as "a counterpart to the surrounding trees".

== Removal ==
On 21 February 2024, Mansfield District Council decided to remove the sculpture, citing costly and "urgent" structural repairs needed on grounds of health and safety. It was removed over a period of two days, ending on 28 June 2024.

== See also ==
- Art fabrication
