= Kemp-Welch =

Kemp-Welch is a double-barrelled surname of British origin. People with that surname include:

- Edith Kemp-Welch (1870–1941), English artist
- George Kemp-Welch (1907–1944), English cricketer
- Joan Kemp-Welch (1906–1999), British stage and film actress
- John Kemp-Welch (born 1936), British businessman
- Lucy Kemp-Welch (1869–1958), British painter and teacher
- Margaret Kemp-Welch (1874–1968), British painter and teacher

== See also ==
- Kemp (surname)
- Welch (surname)
