= Bushey Rose Garden =

Garden in Bushey, Hertfordshire, England

Coordinates: 51.6441°N 0.3605°W

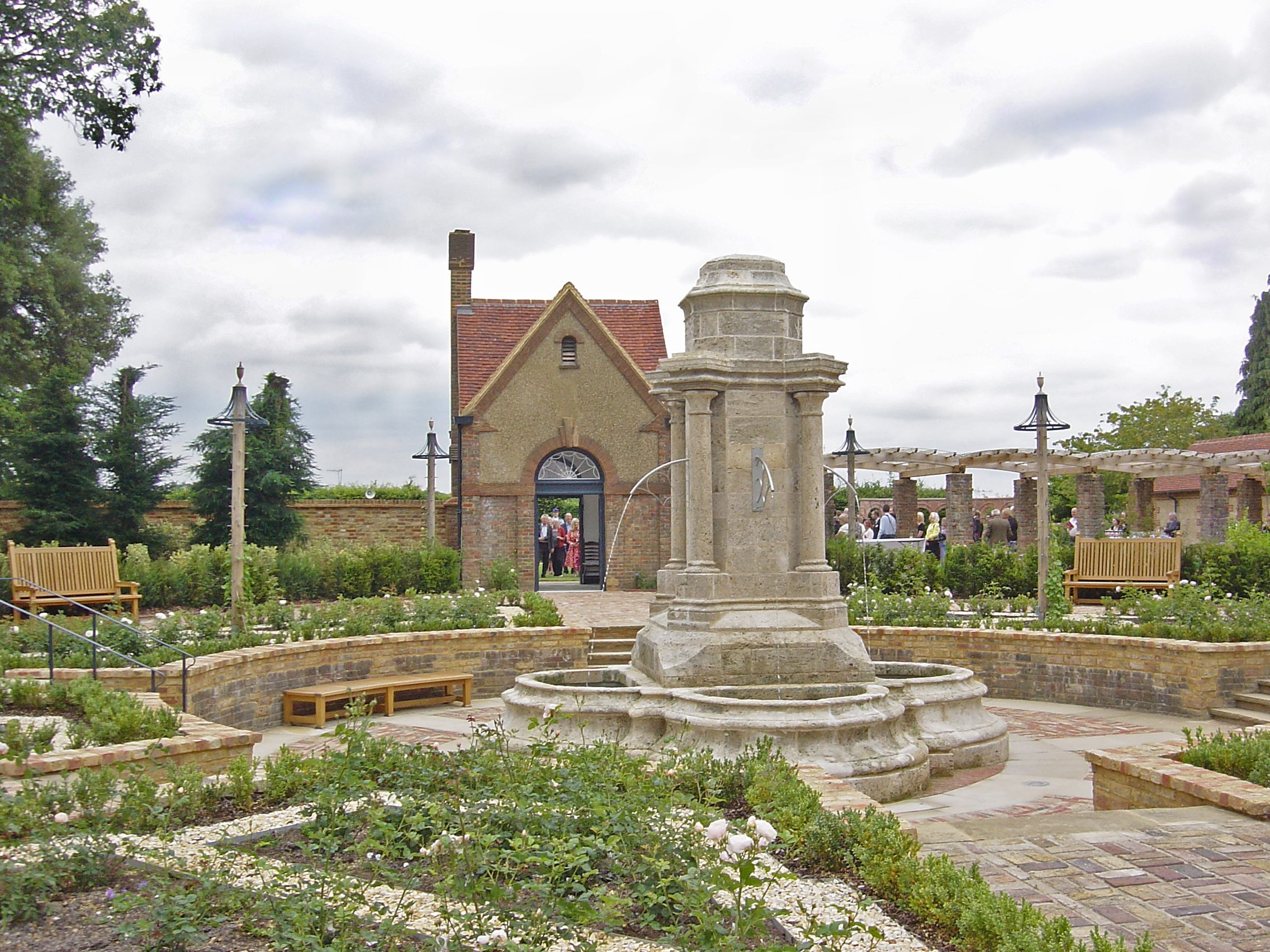
Bushey Rose Garden after restoration.

Bushey Rose Garden is a rose garden in Bushey, Hertfordshire, England.

== History ==
It was created in 1913 by the noted garden designer Thomas Hayton Mawson for the artist Hubert von Herkomer. The client reportedly painted a portrait of Mawson in lieu of a fee. From the 1890s Herkomer lived in a house in Bushey called Lululaund. He also painted a portrait of the architect of the house, H.H. Richardson.

The garden was laid out next to Lululaund. Herkomer had previously used the site for an art school. The school continued in operation on another site under the direction of Lucy Kemp-Welch.

Herkomer died in 1914. He was survived by his third wife, Margaret, Lady Herkomer.

The garden was transferred to municipal ownership in the 1930s after the death of Lady Herkomer. The house was also offered to the council, but was declined and only a remnant survives.

== Description ==
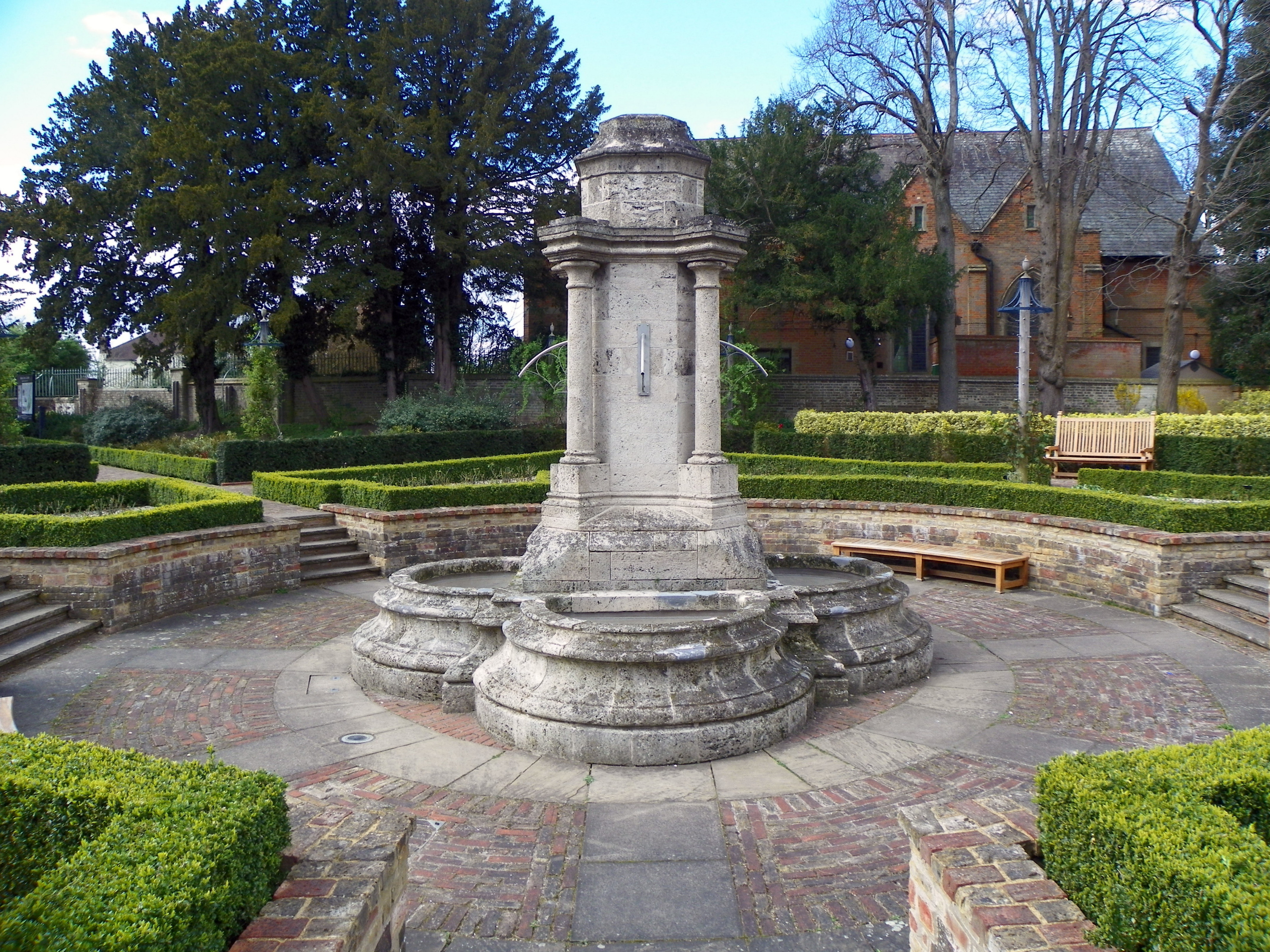
The fountain in 2017, some seven years after its restoration

A focal point in the garden is a fountain made of tufa, a stone also used in the construction of the house. The fountain was listed Grade II in 1985.

== Access and conservation ==
The Rose Garden is located on the High Street, Bushey, Herts, WD23 3HH. In 2002 it was listed grade II on the Register of Parks and Gardens, but it was in poor condition and had to be closed. It was restored with the help of the Heritage Lottery Fund and the Big Lottery Fund. The garden reopened in 2010, and the restoration, for which the lead consultants were LUC, was commended by the Landscape Institute.
