= Algernon Talmage =

British artist (1871–1939)

Algernon Mayow Talmage
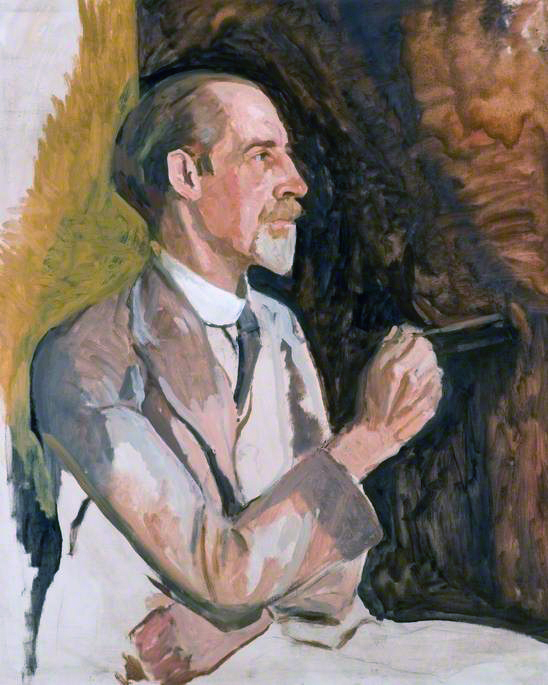
- Self portrait

Personal details
- Born: 23 February 1871 Fifield, Oxfordshire
- Died: 14 September 1939 (aged 68)
- Spouse(s): Gertrude Rowe (1896-1905), Hilda Fearon

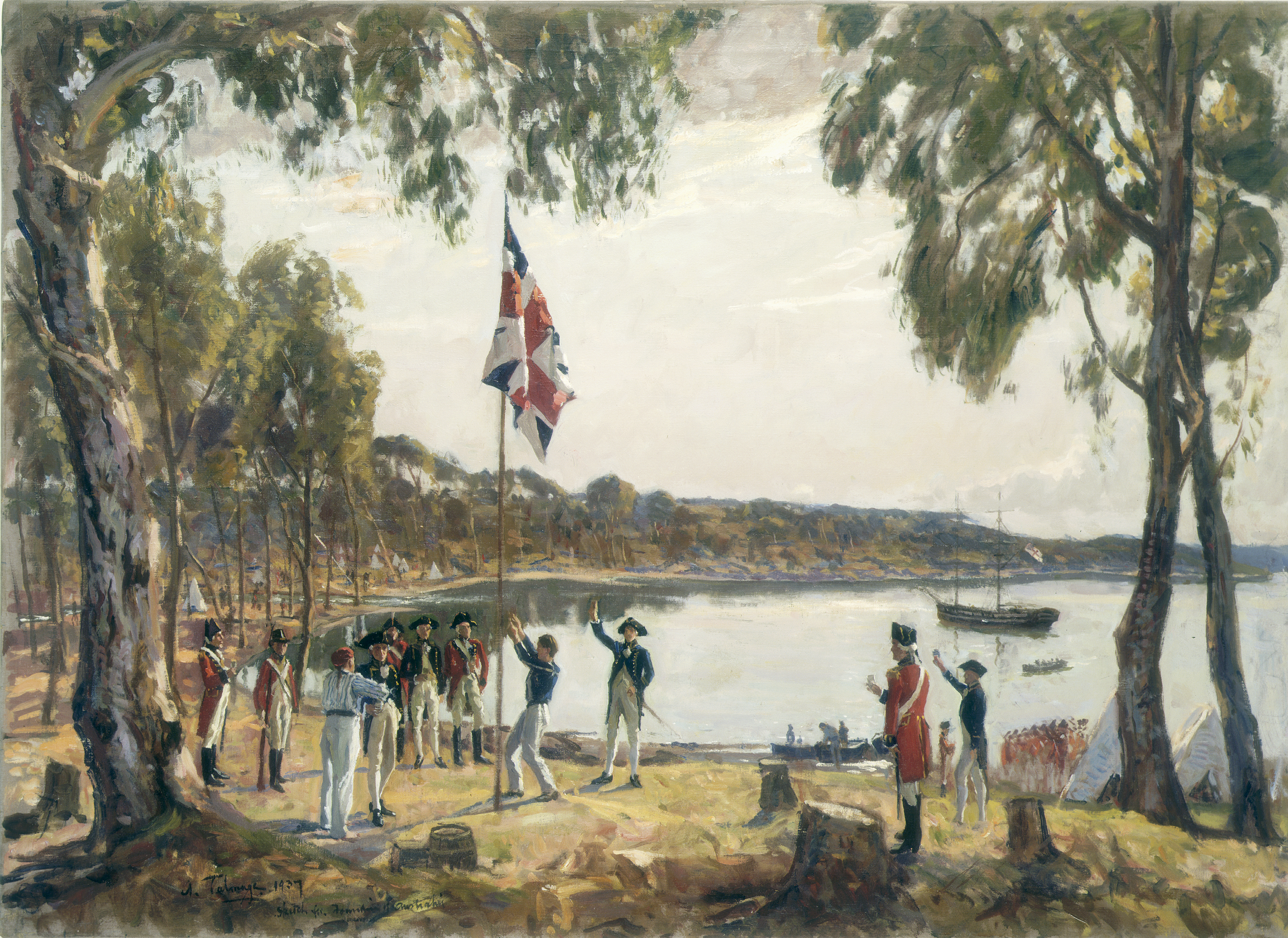
Algernon Talmage, The Founding of Australia, 26 January 1788, by Captain Arthur Phillip R.N. at Sydney Cove. Oil sketch, 1937

Algernon Mayow Talmage (23 February 1871 – 14 September 1939) RA ROI was a British Impressionist painter.

== Life and education ==
Algernon Talmage was born in Fifield, Oxfordshire, the son of Rev. John Mayow Talmage, a clergyman of Cornish stock. During his childhood, Talmage got into an accident with a gun, permanently injuring his right hand; as a result Talmage painted with his left hand and was exempt from active service in the First World War. In 1892, Talmage studied under Hubert von Herkomer at the Herkomer School of art in Bushey. During his time at Herkomer, Talmage painted alongside Lucy Kemp-Welch, both of whom had a great interest in painting landscapes and horses. From there he moved to St Ives, Cornwall, where he joined the St Ives School. During his time in Cornwall Talmage founded an artists' club which was greatly influenced by the Cornish coastline. Talmage's time in Cornwall was significant in establishing his characteristic mellow palette and enchanting use of light. Talmage tutored Emily Carr during her studies at St Ives when he lived and worked in his studio which was then called 'The Cabin' located on Westcotts Quay, St Ives. His criticism was a significant early influence on her work, encouraging her earliest forays into the forest paintings that would eventually become her trademark. Carr's vivid palette grew from his critical reminder that "there is sunlight in the shadows." The well-known Australian painter Will Ashton was another of his students.

In 1896, Talmage married Cornish artist Gertrude Rowe and together they had two daughters, Archie and Dorothy. In 1900 Talmage and fellow St Ives School artist Albert Julius Olsson established the Cornish School of Landscape, Figure and Sea Painting. Later, Talmage and Gertrude ran their own art school, with Olsson acting as a 'visiting' artist. Talmage separated from Gertrude in 1907, and moved to Chelsea, London with his former-pupil Hilda Fearon.

== Work and exhibitions ==
Throughout his career as an artist, Talmage worked with the mediums of landscape, portrait and animal painting, printing and etching. He held his first solo exhibition in the Goupil Gallery, London, 1909. Talmage is also well known for creating the painting 'The Founding of Australia', which was commissioned by the founder of the Australasian Pioneers Club to celebrate the sesquicentennial of 1938. The finished painting was unveiled at the Royal Academy of Arts, London in 1937.

The painting depicts the moment Governor Phillip (in the centre of the painting) proposed a toast to King George III, on the evening of 26 January 1788, the day that the Fleet moved from Botany Bay to Sydney Cove. The painting is a celebration of righteousness and importance of colonisation, and a statement of the power of the British Empire.

He was elected a member of the Royal Society of British Artists in October 1902. He was a war artist on the Western Front in France (below).

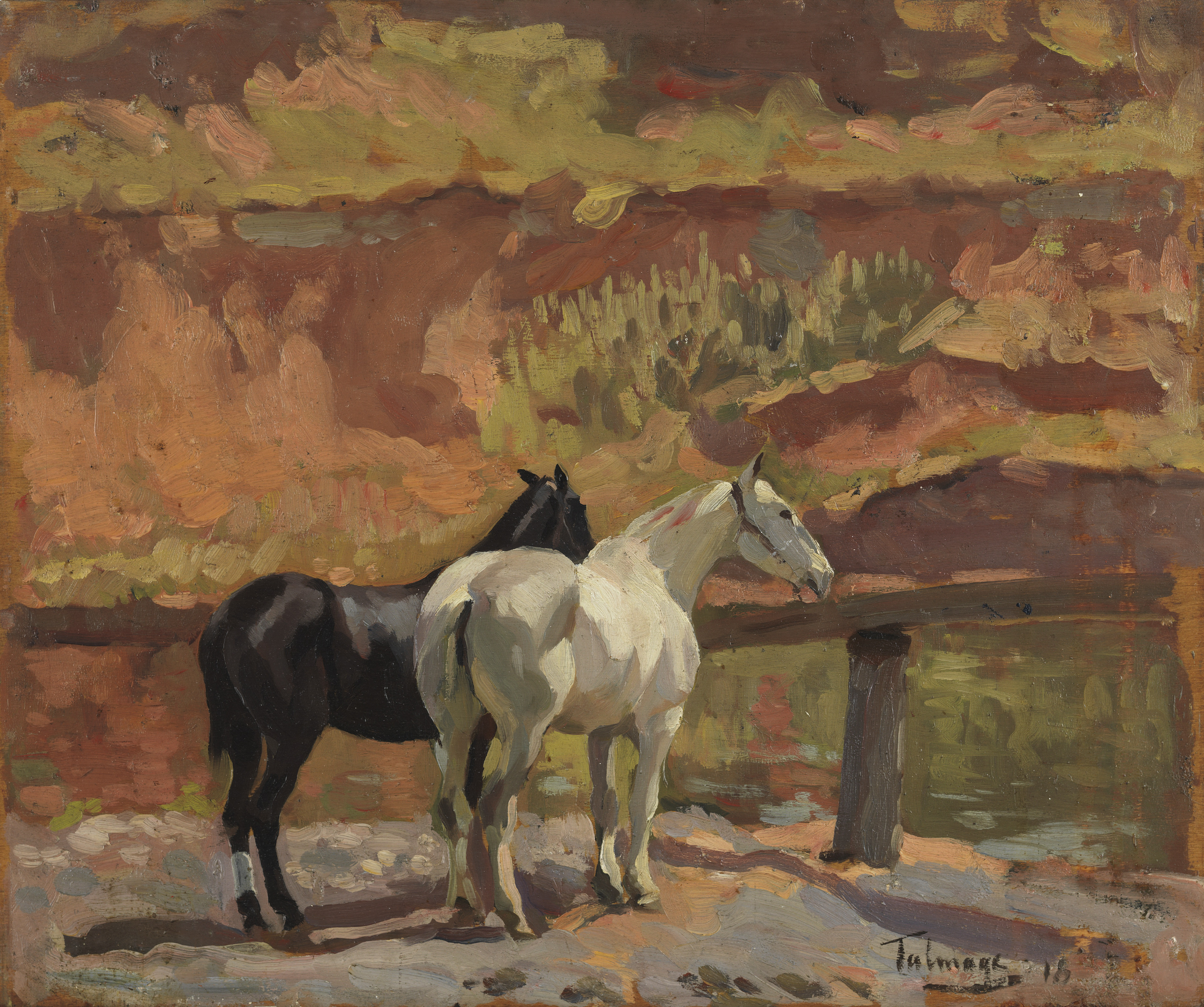
Convalescents

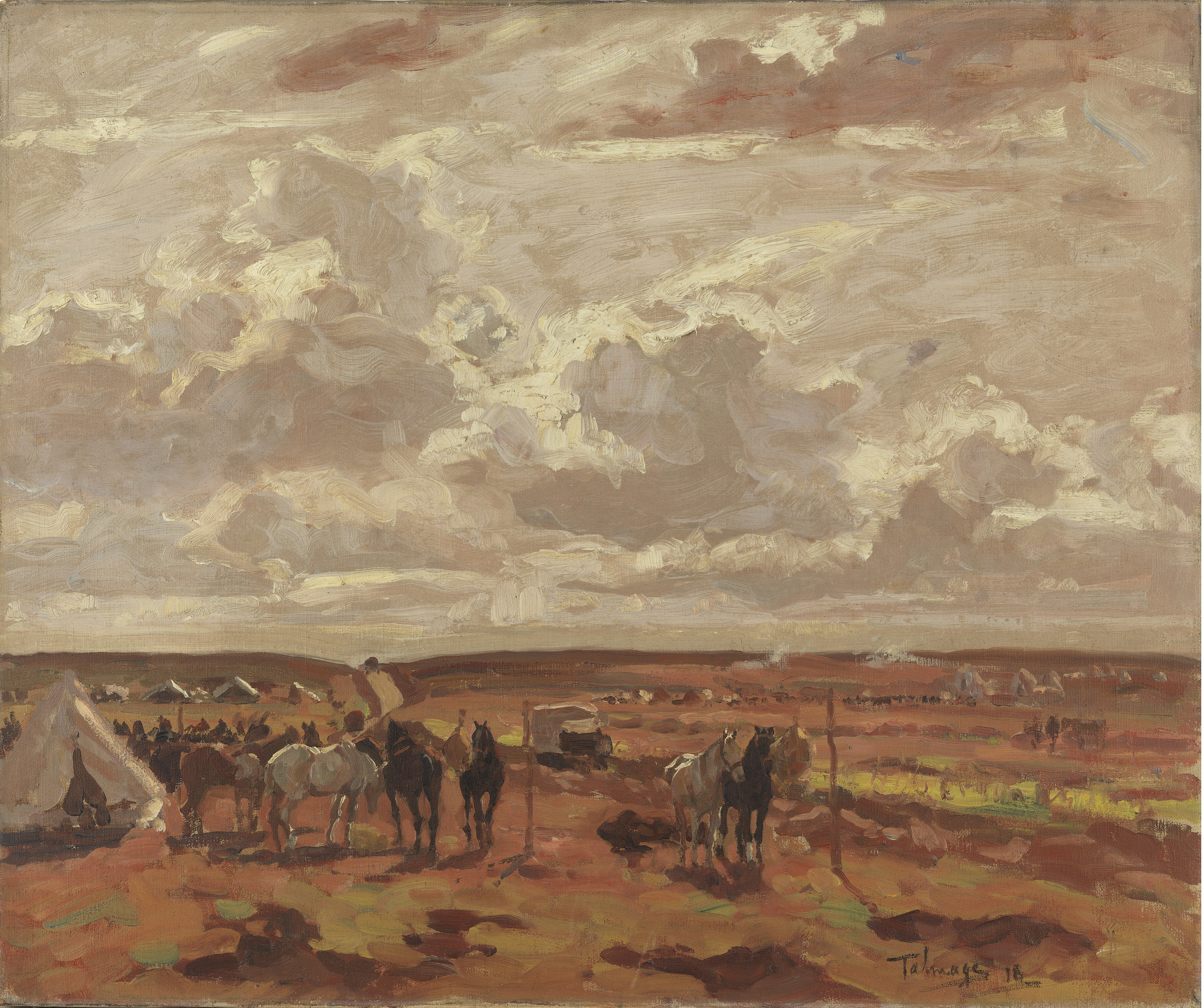
Camp at Agny

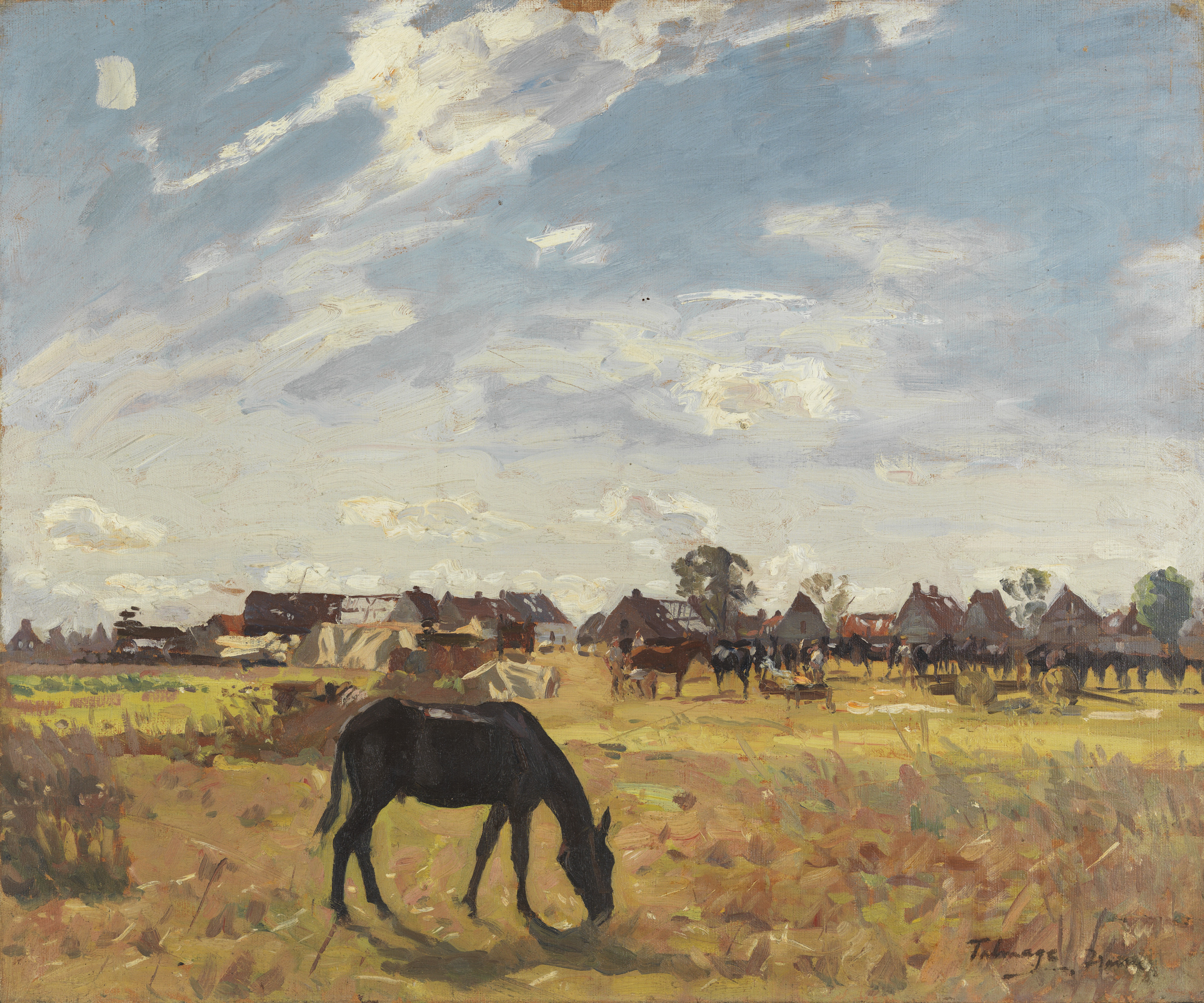
A Mobile Veterinary Unit in France

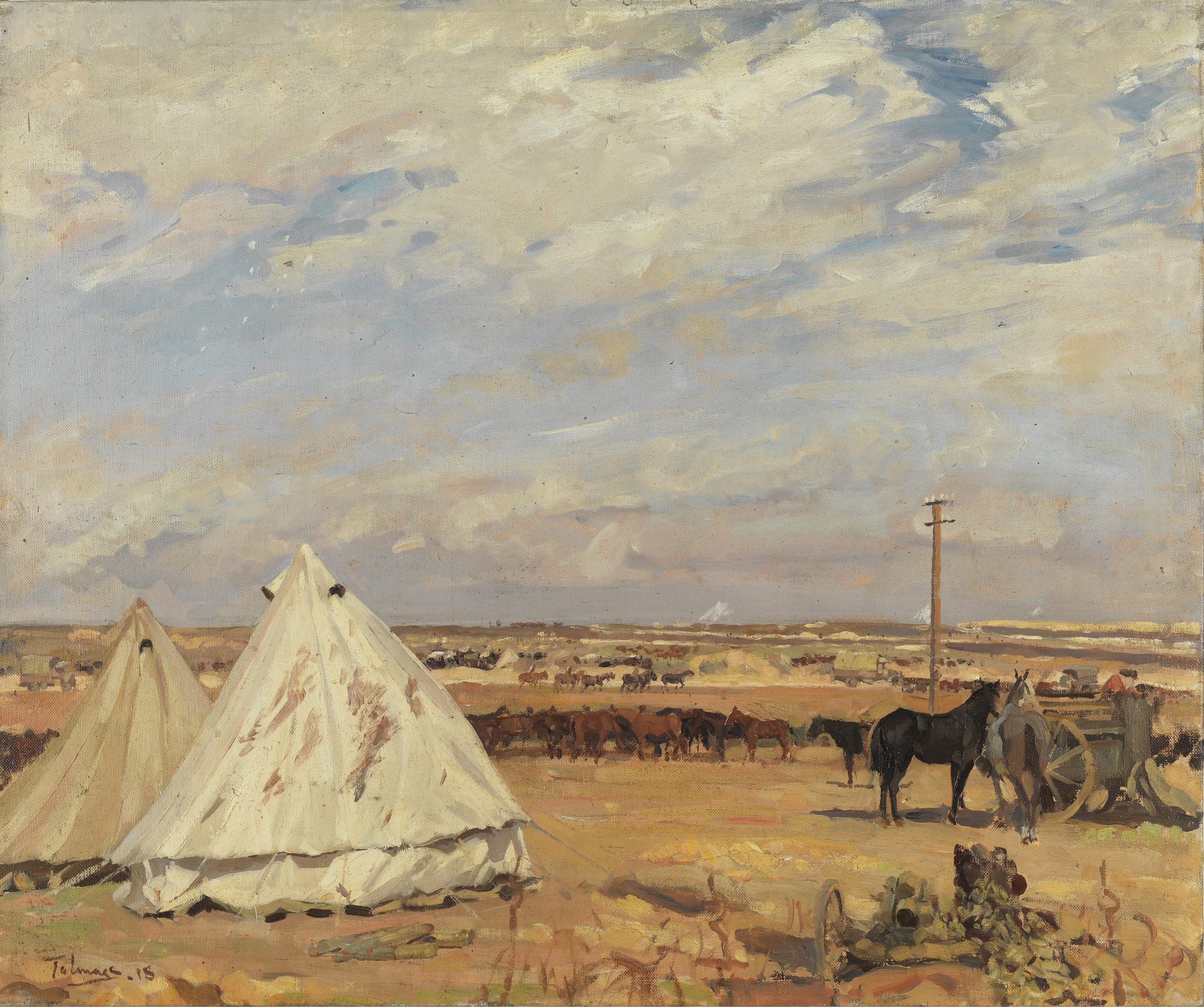
At an Evacuating Station

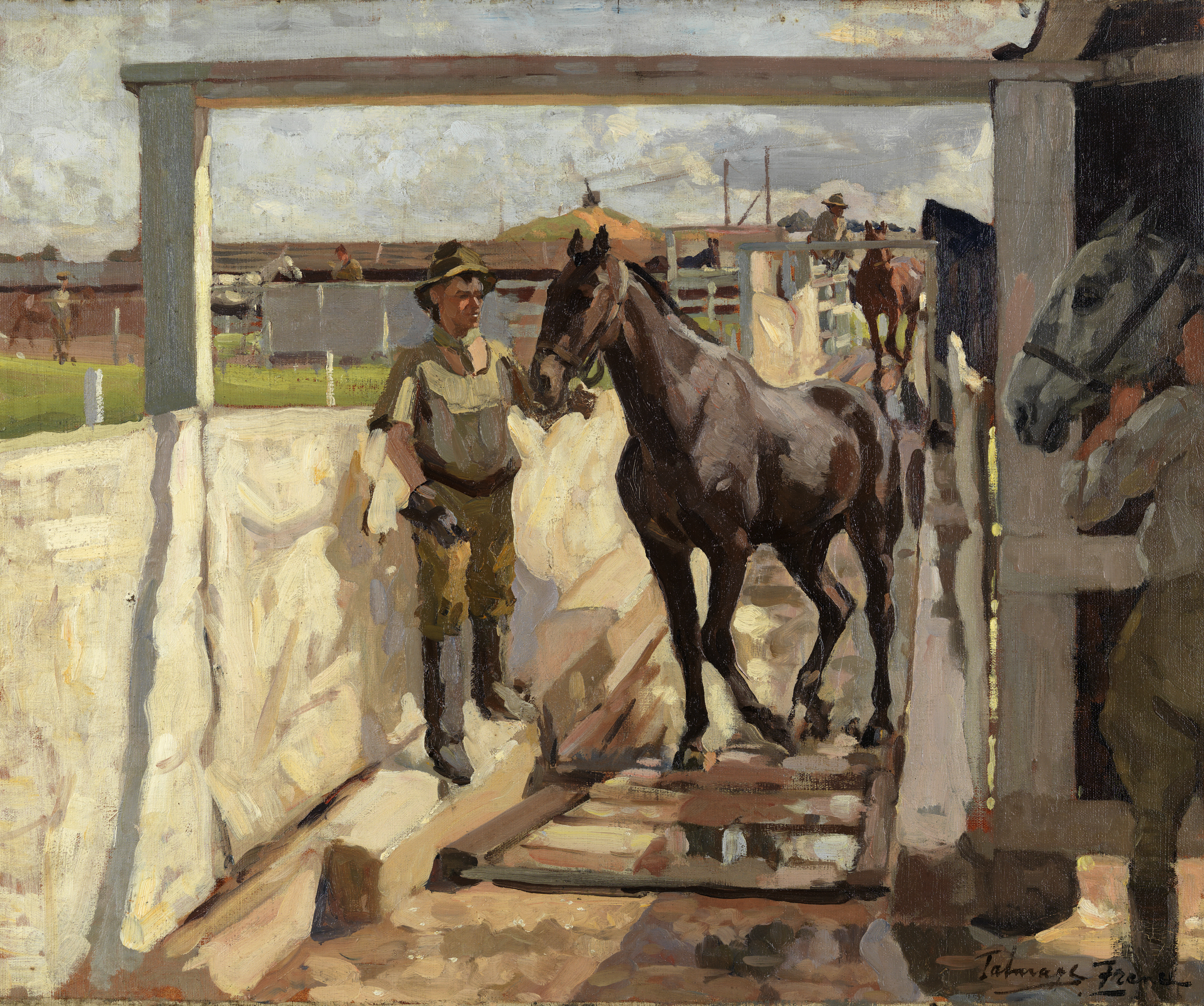
The Sulphur Dip for Mange

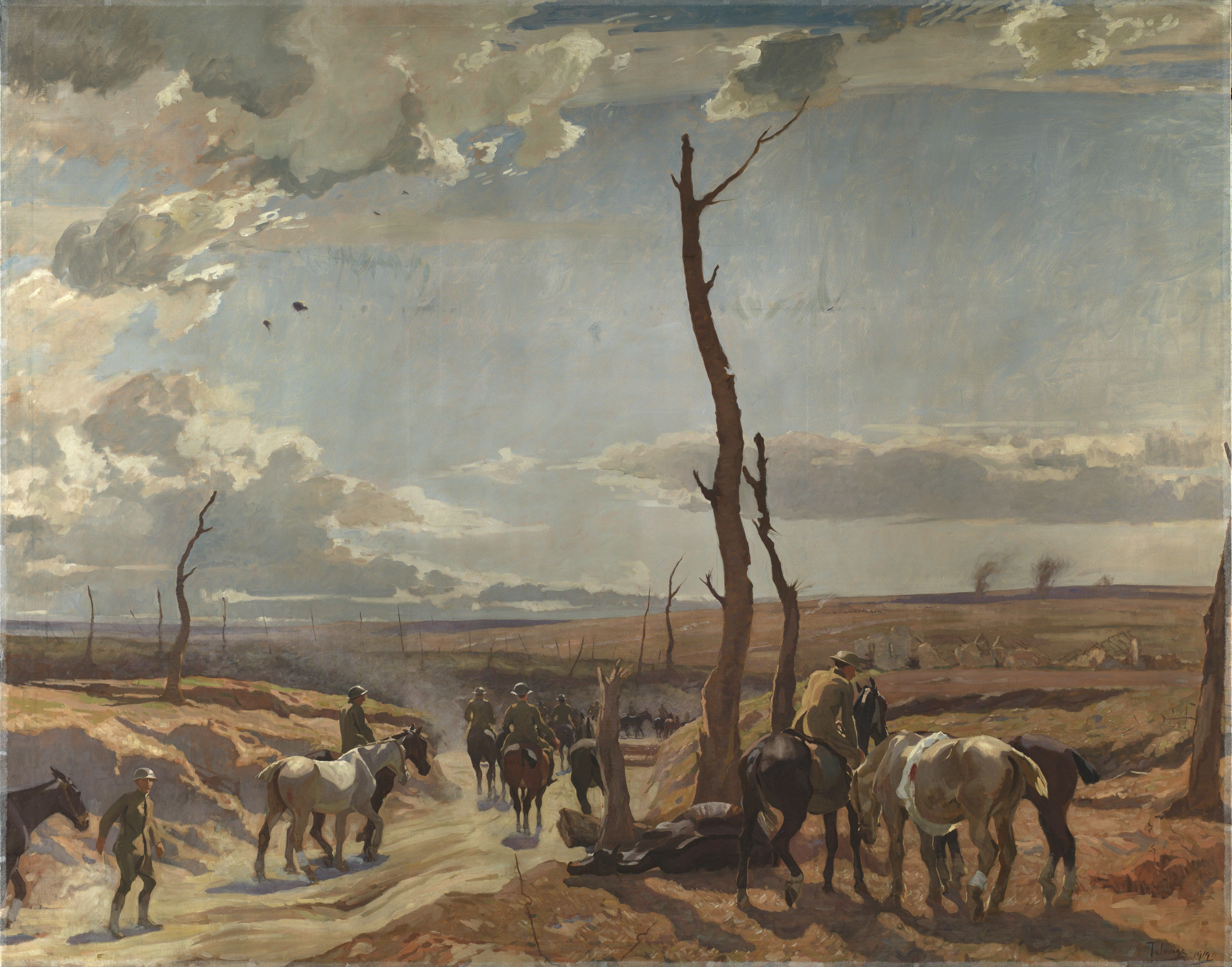
A Mobile Veterinary Unit in France

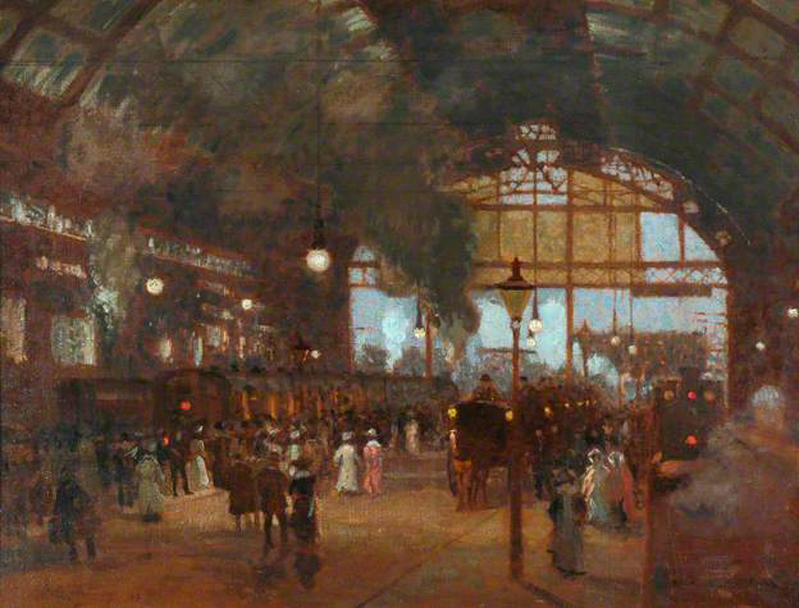
Cannon Street Station
