= Edith Kemp-Welch =

British artist (1870-1941)

Edith Mary Kemp-Welch (1870–1941) was a British artist, known as a portrait painter.

== Biography ==
Edith Kemp-Welch grew up in Bournemouth and attended the Bournemouth School of Art before, in 1892, enlisting in the art school established by Hubert von Herkomer at Bushey in Hertfordshire. She continued to live in Bushey when her elder sister, Lucy Kemp-Welch, took over the running of the school. Between 1898 and 1940, Edith Kemp-Welch exhibited a total of 29 paintings, which were mostly portraits but also included at last one landscape, at the Royal Academy in London. During the First World War, both sisters produced recruiting posters supporting the British war effort. The poster created by Edith Kemp-Welch featured an image of Britannia with the slogan "Remember Scarborough ! Enlist Now", a reference to the war-time attack on Scarborough. Works by Kemp-Welch are held by the Imperial War Museum in London and by Bushey Museum and Art Gallery. Her cousin Margaret Kemp-Welch (1874–1968) was also an artist.
