= Lululaund =

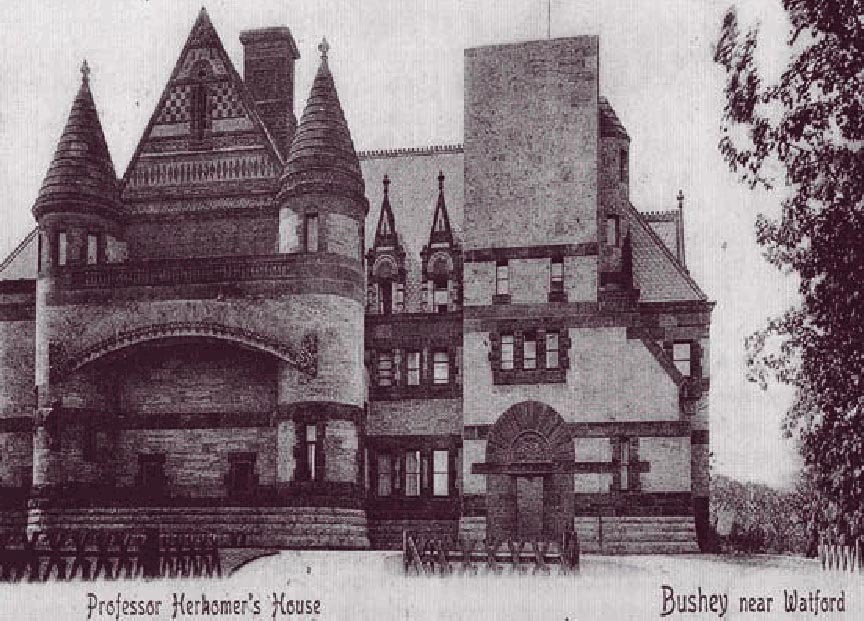
- Lululaund from Melbourne Road, Bushey, UK (postcard c. 1900). The south front showing main entrance
- Interactive map of the Lululaund area

General information
- Type: Private house
- Architectural style: Romanesque Revival architecture
- Location: 43 Melbourne Road, Bushey, Hertfordshire, WD23 3LL, England, United Kingdom
- Coordinates: 51°38′38.64″N 00°21′32.54″W
- Current tenants: Demolished 1939
- Construction started: 1886
- Completed: 1894
- Client: Hubert von Herkomer

Design and construction
- Architect: Henry Hobson Richardson
- Other designers: Hubert Herkomer (interiors)

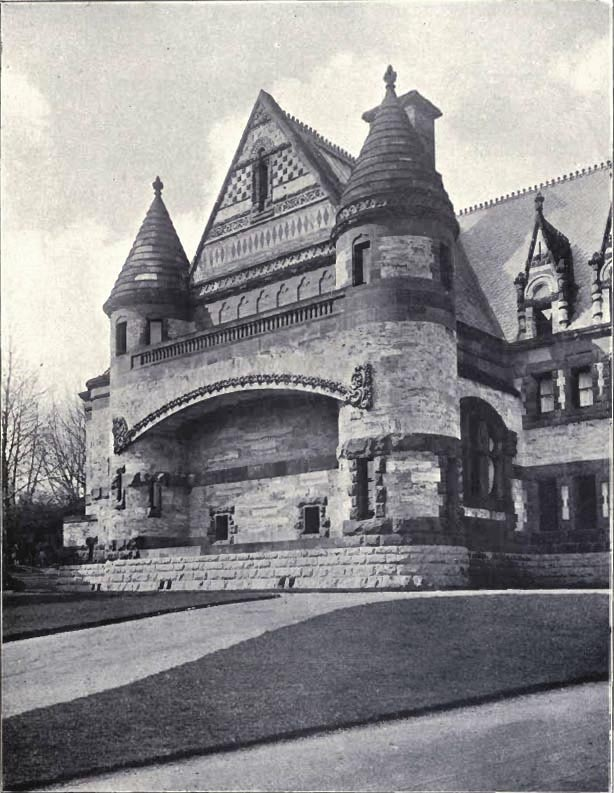
The wide segmental arch across most of the frontage; c. 1910

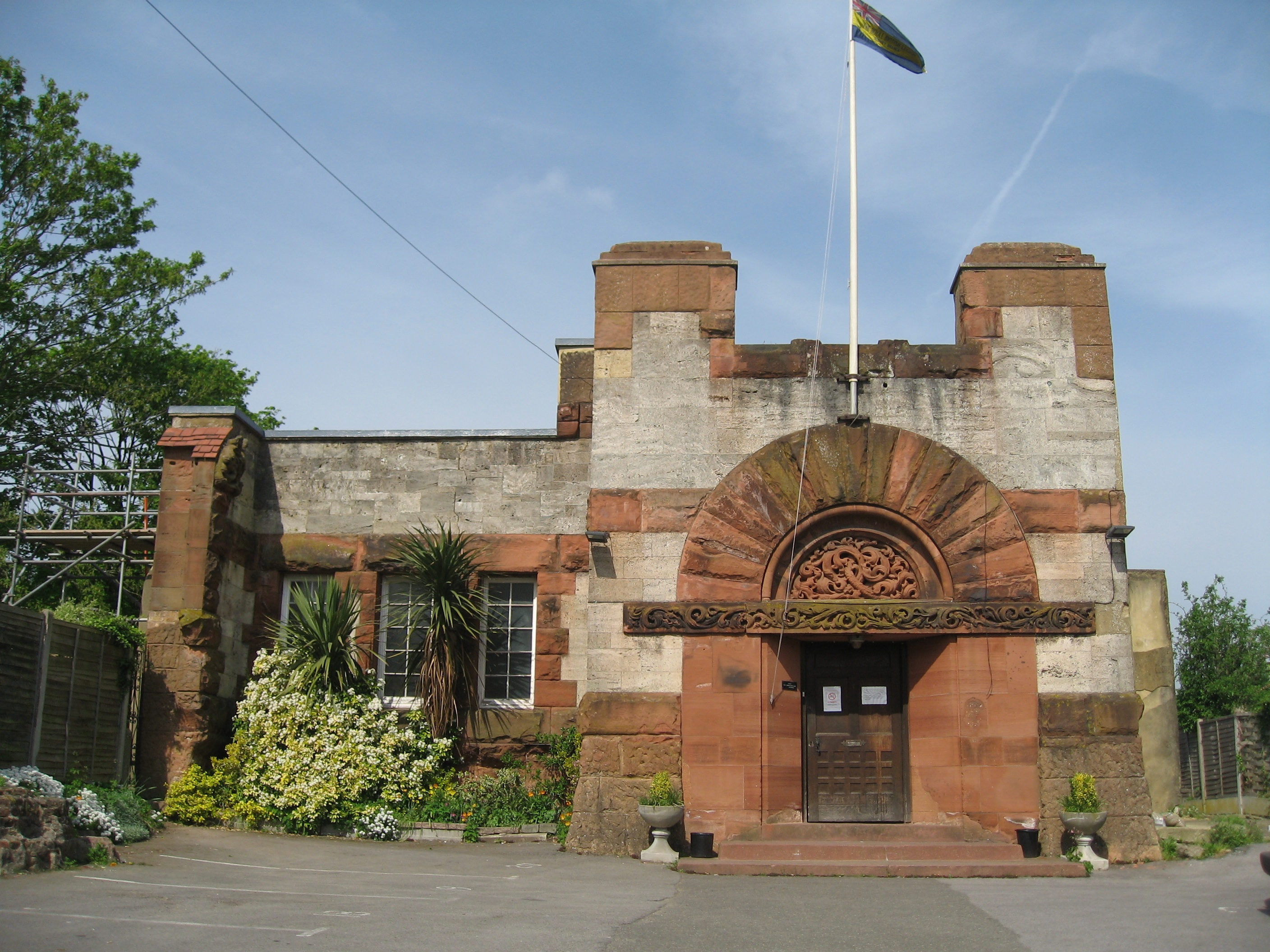
British Legion hall (2009). The arched entrance-way in the c. 1900 photo of Lululaund

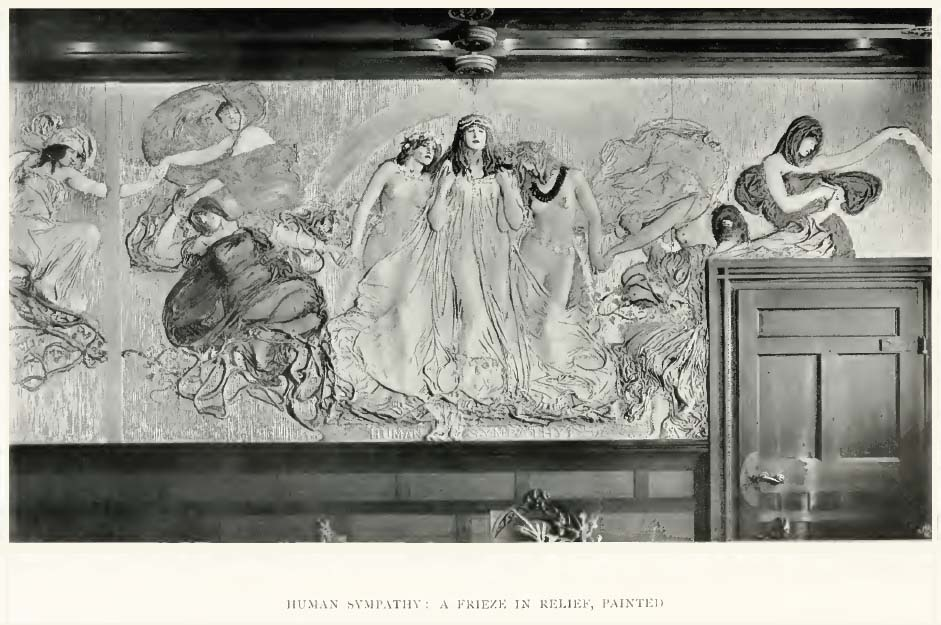
Dining room, 'Human Sympathy', a frieze in painted relief; c. 1901

Lululaund was the Romanesque Revival-style house and studio of the Bavarian-born British artist Hubert von Herkomer, in Melbourne Road, Bushey, Hertfordshire. It was designed about 1886 and completed by 1894. The house was demolished in 1939.

The exterior design was developed from a sketch by the American architect Henry Hobson Richardson and was the only example of his work in Europe. It was an influence on the work of English architect Charles Harrison Townsend.

== Design ==
In the 1880s, Herkomer had travelled to America twice to paint portraits and to give lectures. In early 1886, he painted the American architect Henry Hobson Richardson in exchange for a house design he could bring back to Britain. Richardson, at the peak of his career and only months before his death at the age of 47, sketched a single picture of a four-storey Romanesque castle, explicitly allowing Herkomer to change the exterior "at will". From this sketch, Herkomer commissioned the house.

Herkomer's father and two of his three uncles contributed to the design, which was honoured by the artist in the triptych The Makers of my House. His uncle John, a joiner and carver, as was Herkomer's father Lorenz, came from America to assist, and his uncle Anton, a weaver, provided draperies designed by the artist.

The house was built in white tufa imported from Bavaria and in red sandstone. A plinth of courses of rugged stone formed the lower level, while above was a wide segmental arch across most of the frontage, framed by two round turreted towers. At the top was a patterned gable. A tower rising above the front door was truncated during its construction when Herkomer discovered it would obstruct light into his studio. Herkomer was solely responsible for the design of the interiors.

The rooms were in German gothic style, extravagantly decorated with elaborate wood carvings executed by himself and members of his family. The principal bedroom had a copper ceiling and had wood carved walls entirely covered with gold leaf. The hall and staircase were lined with panels of redwood, three feet wide and 30 feet high. The dining room was decorated with a relief frieze of nude female figures, illustrating Human Sympathy. It was illuminated by concealed electric lights, an innovation for its time. The drawing room had a vast arched chimney-piece and a music gallery .

The house was, for its time, built to a very high technical standard, had for instance electricity from its own generator (in a sidehouse), as well as hot and cold water in each bedroom.

== History ==
Herkomer named the house Lululaund after his deceased wife, Lulu, who had died from a heart attack in 1885. The architect, Richardson, also died, long before the house was completed. Herkomer lived in the house from its completion in 1894 until his death in 1914. Lululaund was nicknamed the 'Bavarian castle' by Bushey residents.

Herkomer built a theatre in the grounds where he staged 'pictorial-music-plays' that he partly wrote and designed himself. When Herkomer became a pioneer of cinematography the theatre was later turned into a film studio and cinema, and he directed and acted in several films that were released commercially.

In the 1880s Herkomer created an art school. After he retired from the school, the building was demolished, although the school continued on another site under the direction of Lucy Kemp-Welch. The landscape architect Thomas Mawson was commissioned in 1913 to design a rose garden on the original site.

When Herkomer died in 1914, his third wife, Margaret, Lady Herkomer, sister of his second wife, Lulu Griffiths, the house's namesake, moved out of Lululaund to another property nearby. Lululaund was requisitioned during the First World War, but subsequently remained largely unoccupied. The house and the film studio were leased in 1915 by the British Actors Film Company for use as their principal production base. The company ran into financial difficulties in the early 1920s and closed the site in 1923. The film boom of the 1930s caused it to reopen the studio, making short films.

During the 1920s and 1930s the surrounding estate land was gradually broken-up and sold for development. The buildings largely fell into disuse. For a number of years the house became the haunt of tramps, courting couples and schoolboys.

Lady Herkomer died in 1934, and the trustees of the Herkomer Estate offered the house, rose garden and kitchen garden to Bushey Urban District Council. The house was refused due to the high cost of maintenance but in 1937 the rose garden was transferred to the ownership of the council. Lululaund was almost completely demolished in 1939, on the eve of the Second World War, with only a remnant surviving. It is possible that anti-German feeling and the fear it was an elevated landmark and a navigational marker for enemy bombers influenced the decision.

Much of the masonry from the demolition went as hardcore to build Bovingdon Airfield in 1941.

Films continued to be made in Herkomer's studio until 1985, when it too closed.

A small portion of Richardson's façade survived: the front door and its tympanum were used for the entrance to the former Royal British Legion hall on Melbourne Road, Bushey. In 2014 this was redeveloped into housing, with the entrance doorway retained.

The rose garden, summer-house, sunken garden, and pergola of Lululaund were preserved and are now public gardens known as the Bushey Rose Garden.

== Quotations ==
Herkomer wrote in the 1911 second volume of his autobiography: "Completed it is not, nor would I wish to feel that the last touch had been put to it. It should still have the possibility of growth, otherwise expectancy would cease, and with it life's greatest stimulant."

His biographer, Baldry, wrote in 1901: "There has been in existence in his family for some generations an idea that there should be erected some day a house which would be at the same time a memorial of the Herkomers and a record of the work that they had done in the world."
