= Rosa Howlett =

English artist and suffragette (1863–1961)

- Born: 1863; Norwich, Norfolk, England
- Died: 1961; Hertford, Hertfordshire, England
- Movement: Arts and Crafts

Rosa Elizabeth Howlett (c. 1863–1961) was a British artist and suffragette.

== Biography ==
Howlett was born in Norwich, Norfolk, and was the daughter of a leather merchant and shoe manufacturer.

Howlett studied under Hubert von Herkomer at his school in Bushey. Her painting "Market Scene" is held in the collection of the Bushey Museum and Art Gallery. She exhibited at the Royal Albert Hall with The London Salon of the Allied Artists' Association in 1901 and 1911.

In 1916, Howlett co-exhibited the work Noah's Ark at the Arts and Crafts Exhibition Society, which she constructed with Margaret West, who she shared a home with. She was also friends with Virginia Woolf.

Howlett was active in the women's suffrage movement. When a branch of the Women's Social and Political Union (WSPU) was opened in Norwich in 1912, she was appointed a local secretary.

Howlett died in 1961 in Hertford, Hertfordshire.
