= Josef Perl =

Holocaust survivor (1930–2018)

Josef Perl (27 April 1930 – Sept. 2018) was a Holocaust survivor who dedicated twenty years of his life to educating people about the Holocaust. He was born in Czechoslovakia and later lived in Bushey, Hertfordshire, England. He received more than 30,000 letters from schoolchildren to whom he spoke about his experiences.

His story has been published in book form as Faces in the Smoke: The Story of Josef Perl by Arthur C. Benjamin, (ISBN 978-0-9541233-0-7).

== Biography ==
Josef was born in 1930 in Velicky Bochkov, Czechoslovakia, into a deeply religious Jewish family. He lived and grew up in the small town where Jewish and non-Jewish people lived together in harmony.

However, things changed rapidly in 1938 after Germany signed a peace treaty with Hungary and the Hungarians took over the administration of the area, under German orders.

In 1940, Josef and some of his family were rounded up and deported to a makeshift camp where they existed for several weeks in appalling conditions. Despite being only ten years old, he managed to escape on a regular basis with a group of boys to find food for his family. Like so many children during the Holocaust, he became the main provider. While he was foraging for food on one of these missions, the camp was cleared.

Josef spent the next eighteen months hiding and trying to find his family. He wandered from town to town foraging for food and shelter, until he was caught and taken to a ghetto. There he witnessed the murder of his mother, four of his eight sisters and their five children. He escaped from the ghetto but was captured and taken to Kraków-Plaszów concentration camp where he worked hard as a forced labourer doing many different jobs.

Between 1941 and 1945, Josef went through Auschwitz, Dachau, Bergen-Belsen, Gross-Rosen, Balkenhain, Hirschberg and Buchenwald concentration camps. His life in these camps was mentally and physically exhausting. He worked 12-hour shifts with only one meal a day (which consisted of a minuscule portion of bread and watery soup). Many people died from the lack of food, sleep deprivation, and regular beatings.

Towards the end of 1944, as the Soviet troops approached Balkenhain, Josef and the remaining prisoners, about 5,000 of them, were sent on a death march to move them further into Germany, away from the advancing armies. They marched for two weeks in freezing temperatures and heavy snow. Eventually, they were loaded onto wagons and taken to Buchenwald. Only 178 people had survived the journey from Balkenhain and Josef was one of them. On April 11, 1945, Buchenwald was liberated by the American forces.

After the war Josef lived in the south of England with his wife Sylvia until his death in September 2018, aged 88 years. He regularly spoke to students and groups about his experiences, until his retirement in 2009, in the hope that the younger generation will make a difference to the future.
