= Margaret Kemp-Welch =

British artist

Margaret Drury Kemp-Welch (1874 – 15 January 1968) was a British painter and printmaker, mostly of landscape and portraits. She was also a teacher.

== Biography ==
Kemp-Welch was born in Wandsworth in London, the daughter of Stanley Kemp-Welch (1843–1929) and Wilhelmina Louisa Kemp-Welch, née Laing (1848–1934). She grew up in Kensington and received her education at the Royal Academy of Arts. She was the cousin of the artists Edith and Lucy Kemp-Welch and studied under Sir Frank Short and at Hubert von Herkomer's school (as did her cousins) in Bushey in Hertfordshire from 1891. She taught at Clapham High School and exhibited at the Royal Academy in London, at the Royal Institute of Painters in Water Colours, at the Paris Salon, the Royal Society of Painter-Etchers and Engravers (RE), and the Ridley Art Club. Kemp-Welch became an Associate of the Royal Society of Painter-Etchers and Engravers (ARE) in 1901.

Brenda Girvin, an author of girl's novels, dedicated her 1918 book Munition Mary to "Margaret Kemp-Welch, My Munition Friend", which suggests that they were both munitions workers during the First World War.

Kemp-Welch lived in London and then in Georgeham in Devon during the 1920s and 1930s and where a mural painted by her is in St George's church in the village. The British Museum holds three of her prints and the Bushey Museum has many examples of her work. With Constance Cotterell she wrote the libretto for The Christmas Rose - a children's opera in three scenes with music by Frank Bridge. She also provided line illustrations for two albums of piano music by Frank Bridge: Miniature Pastorals, Set 1 and Set 2. Each of these contains three short piano pieces, and there is an illustration on the page each piece begins on, depicting scenes apparently from British village life.

Margaret Kemp-Welch died on 15 January 1968 at Brighton in Sussex.
