= Hilda Fearon =

British artist

Hilda Fearon (1878–1917) was a British artist of the St Ives School.

== Life and education ==
Hilda Fearon was born in 1878 in Banstead, Surrey, the third daughter of Paul Bradshaw Fearon, a wine and spirits merchant, and his wife Edith Jane Duffield, of Court House. She was baptised, aged 9, together with her four siblings in Swanage, Dorset, in 1888.

She left Banstead to study art in Dresden (1897–99) with Robert Sterl, then at Slade (1899-1904) and with Algernon Talmage in St Ives, Cornwall; Talmage (then living apart from his wife) and she had neighbouring apartments at Cathcart Studios, Chelsea, at the turn of the century and they later lived together although did not marry.

== Works and exhibitions ==
Fearon began to make a name for herself as a member of the St Ives School, being one of the plein air artists whose work was exhibited at St Ives and Cheltenham in 1906 (The End of the Evening and Moonlit Harbour), and exhibited regularly from the mid-1900s onwards. Although she continued to paint land and beach/seascapes, her work diversified from the that associated with the St Ives School to cover a variety of subjects; she frequently depicted figures of women and children set in interiors. Her work The Song, was described as a "small but very admirable" portrait group, at the Royal Academy in 1909, which the critic at the Daily News described as "admirable in tone, good as pattern, interesting in temper" and remarked that Fearon "appears... to have something to say."

Her paintings were exhibited regularly in the years leading up to her death and were reviewed by the critic. Venues at which she exhibited included the Royal Institute of Painters in Water-Colours, London, the Goupil Gallery, the New English Art Club, White City Stadium and at provincial shows. She was a regular exhibitor at the Royal Academy of Arts each year (Willows, 1908; The Song, 1909; The White Room and The Sandpit, 1910; The Window and The Morning Drive, 1911; The Ballet Master, 1912; Midsummer, Under the Cliffs and Silver and Green, 1913; Enchantment, 1914; The Breakfast Table and Nannie, Bessie and John, 1916; The Road Across the Downs and Afternoon Sunshine, 1917).

== Final exhibition and death ==
Fearon's paintings at the 1917 RA exhibition, both figures-in-landscape paintings described by one critic as "things seen and felt" (Afternoon Sunshine depicted two children playing with a goat in the sunshine against a background of rocks; The Road Across the Downs showed a lady in a cart, on a white road over the downs) were said by The Gentlewoman's art correspondent to be "very delightful" and to sustain the artist's growing reputation. By the time the article in The Gentlewoman was published, Fearon was dead: she died on 2 June 1917, aged 38.

At the time of her death, Fearon was living with Talmage at 22 Jouberts Mansions, Jubilee Place, off the Kings Road in Chelsea.

== Collections ==
Her work is included in the collections of the Tate Gallery, London, and the Art Gallery of South Australia.

== Gallery ==
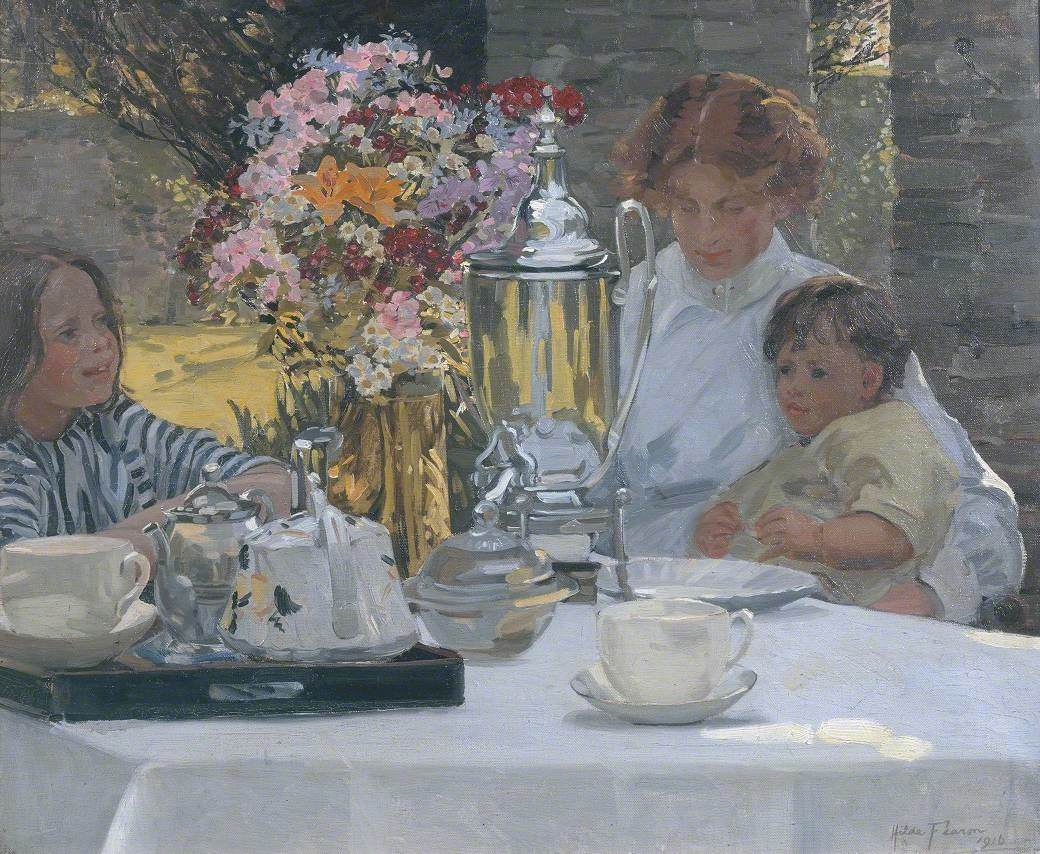
The Tea Party (1916)

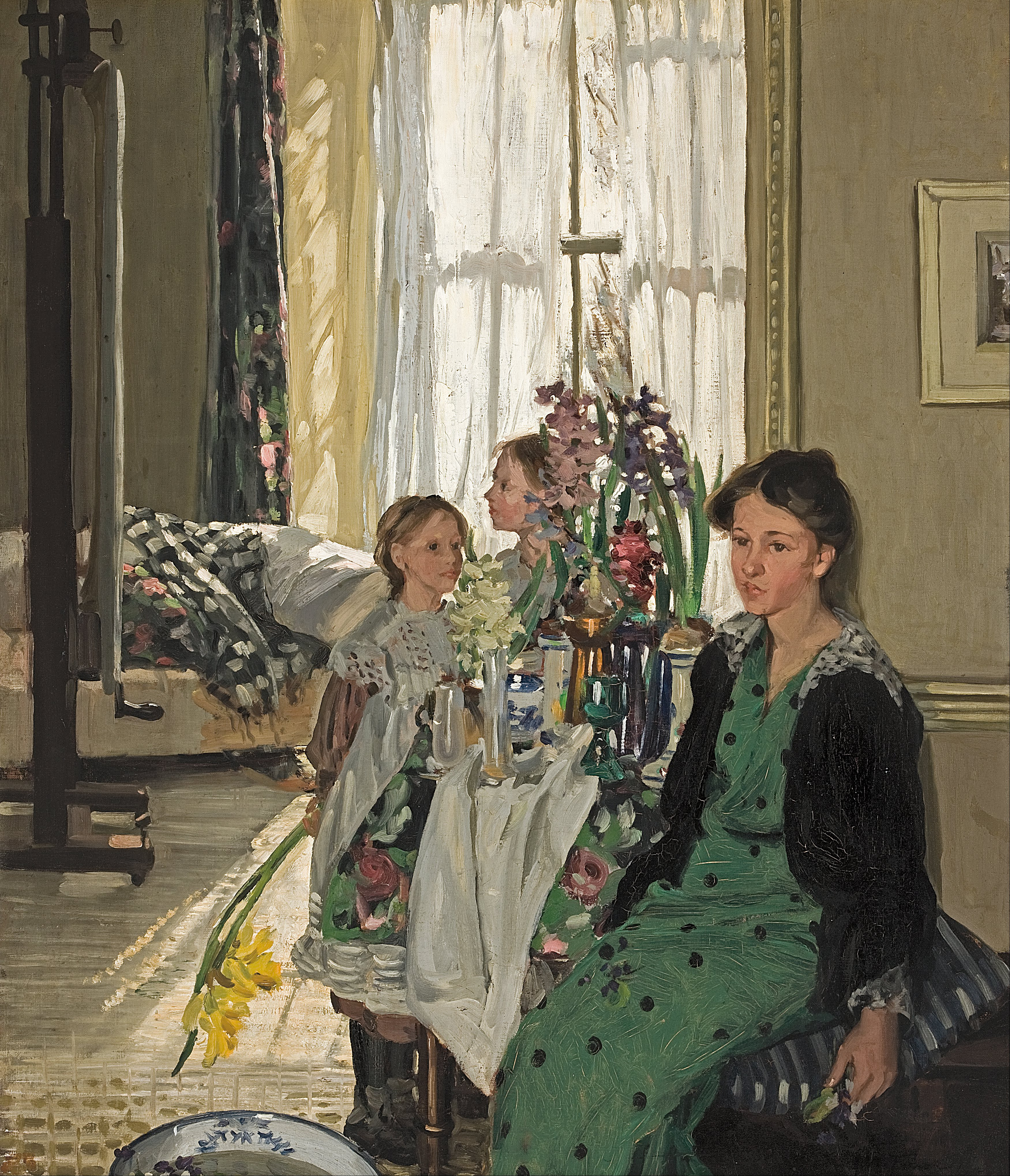
Studio interior (1914)

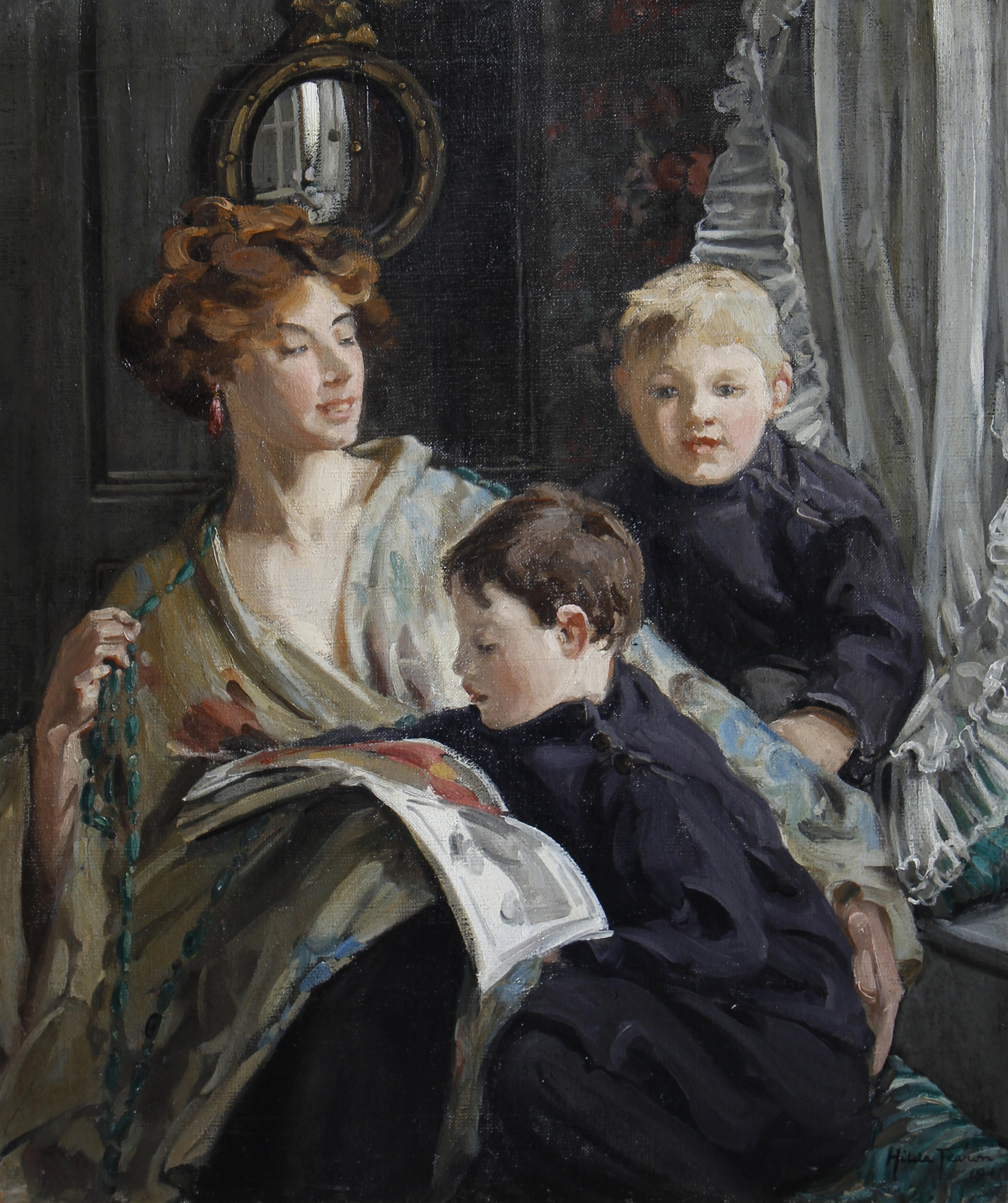
A portrait of a mother and her two sons (1911)

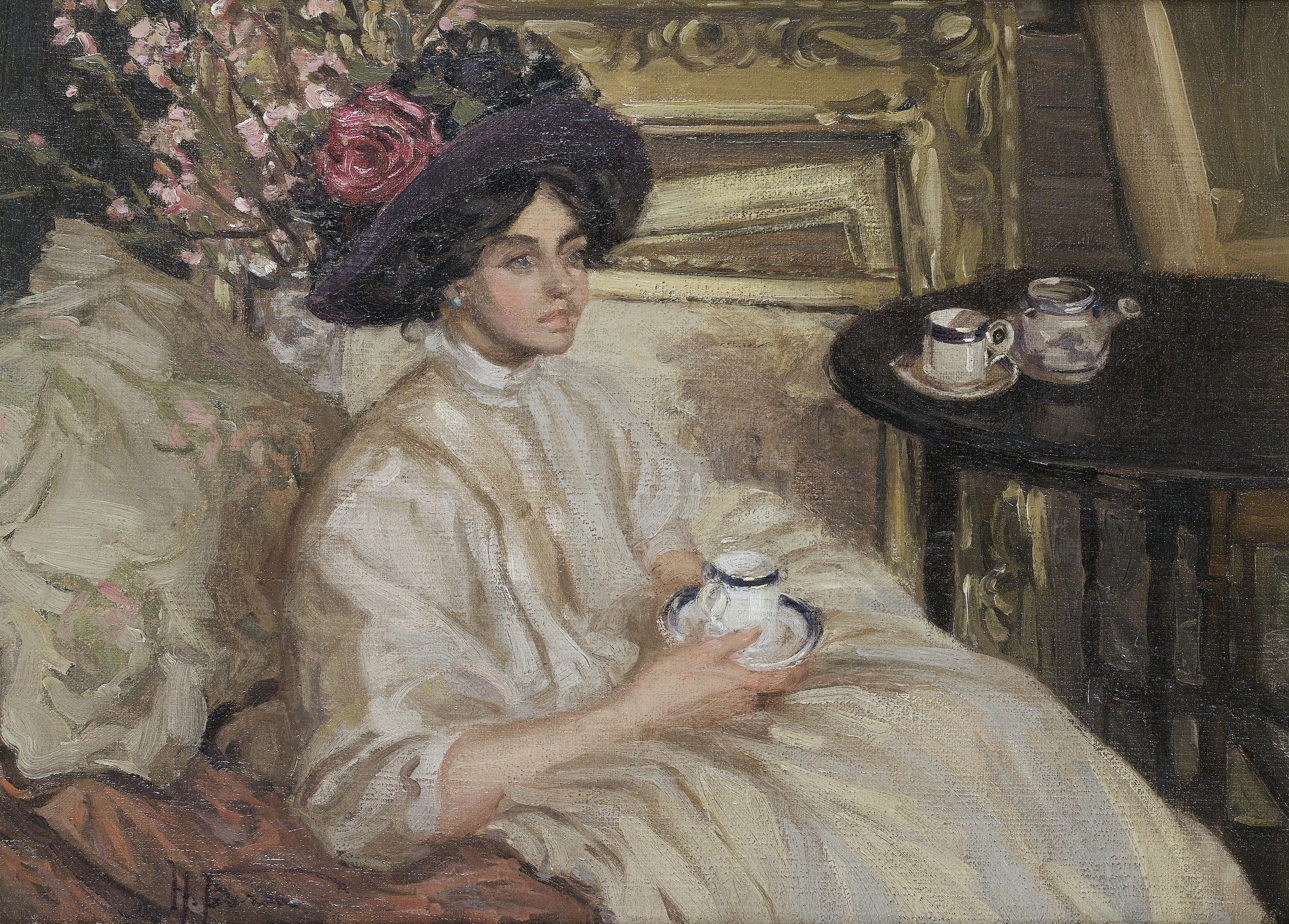
Afternoon tea (undated)
