= Bushey Museum & Art Gallery =

Coordinates: 51°38′43″N 00°21′54″W

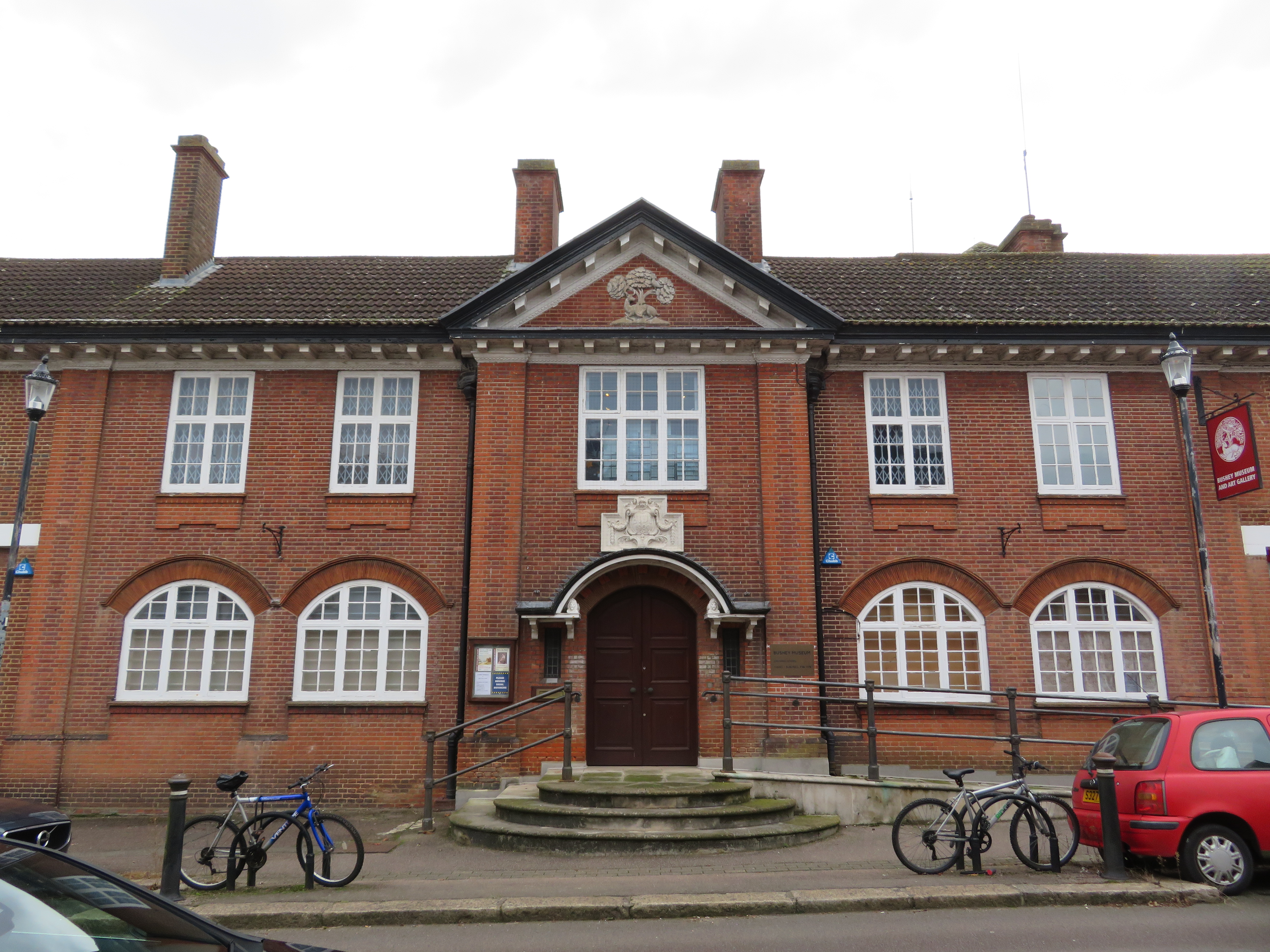
Bushey Museum exterior view, December 2021.

A view of the Herkomer Room at Bushey Museum

A view of one of the Local History Rooms at Bushey Museum

Bushey Museum is in Bushey, Hertfordshire. It was officially opened as a volunteer-run museum in October 1993, having achieved Full Registration with the Museums and Galleries Commission. In the week prior to opening, the Museum won joint first prize in the prestigious Gulbenkian Foundation Awards for the best achievement by museums operating with limited resources. The building, on Rudolph Road in Bushey, had been built in 1909 as the offices of Bushey Urban District Council, and had passed to Hertsmere Borough Council on local government reorganisation in 1974. (Note: The decoration over the main door includes the initials and date "BUDC 1909".)

== Scope ==
Bushey Museum covers local history through the Bushey Museum Trust's collections of artefacts, documents, maps and works of art. The displays tell the story of Bushey, Hertfordshire, with an emphasis on the unique artistic history of the village. They include works by members of the Monro Circle which flourished in the early 19th century. The Museum has a large collection (considered to be of national significance) of works, artefacts and ephemera relating to Sir Hubert von Herkomer RA and his famous School of Art in Bushey which, a century ago, was attracting students from all over the world. There is also a major collection of paintings by Herkomer's student Lucy Kemp-Welch, her cousin Margaret Kemp-Welch, and her companion and protegee Lucy Marguerite Frobisher. The Frobisher Studio there is named after the artist, and functions as a teaching studio. The collection also holds a painting by Herkomer student Rosa Howlett.

Bushey's social history is illustrated through historical maps, displays of archaeology from earliest times to the present day, examples of the wide range of products made in Bushey, for example, Lotts Bricks, Ellams Duplicators and Bushey Heath pottery and displays on life in the village, both in times of peace and war.

A wide range of local records including census material can be inspected at the Museum's Local Studies Centre. The museum runs regular exhibitions examining different aspects of Bushey’s artistic and social and business heritage.

== Friends ==
The Museum is supported by an active Friends of Bushey Museum which numbers some 800 members making it one of the largest such Friends organisations in the country. The Friends hold monthly evening meetings, undertake regular visits to other museums and places of interest and hold social and fundraising events. They support the Museum by providing manpower and by raising funds for new acquisitions.

== Opening ==
Bushey Museum is open every Thursday, Friday, Saturday and Sunday from 11 a.m. to 4 p.m.; entry is free of charge. It is situated at Rudolph Road, Bushey, WD23 3HW.
