= Marguerite Frobisher =

British painter (1890–1974)

Lucy Marguerite Frobisher
- Self-portrait, undated.
- Born: 1890; Leeds
- Died: 1974 (aged 83–84); Bushey
- Resting place: St James' Church, Bushey
- Occupation: Artist

Lucy Marguerite Frobisher (1890–1974) was a British artist and educator, who was the director of the Frobisher School of Painting, and specialised in animal painting. One of her best known works is Apple blossom in the Garden at Kingsley, Bushey.

== Biography ==
Frobisher was born in Leeds in 1890. She studied at the Bushey School of Painting and in 1920 was appointed secretary of the school, founded by artist Lucy Kemp-Welch. Kemp-Welch had been taught by Hubert von Herkomer, and in 1905 took over the running of his art school, renaming it the Bushey School of Painting, and later the Kemp-Welch School of Animal Painting. In 1928 Frobisher took over and renamed it once again, as the Frobisher School of Painting. The school specialised in classes on animal painting with a variety of models.

Noted for the skill and accuracy of her dog paintings, Frobisher also painted a number of paintings inspired by nature, including the celebrated Apple blossom in the Garden at Kingsley, Bushey. In 1930 she exhibited several works in the Royal Cambrian Academy of Art Exhibition. In the same year she became an associate member of the academy, and in 1937, a full member. She was also a member of the Watford & Bushey Art Society.

In later life, Frobisher was the "live-in companion" of Kemp-Welch.

== Death and legacy ==
Frobisher died in 1974. She is buried at St James' Church, Bushey, in the same grave as Kemp-Welch, and Kemp-Welch's sister Edith.

The Frobisher Studio at Bushey Museum & Art Gallery is named after the artist, and functions as a teaching studio. Many of her works are held in its collection.

One former student is the miniaturist Jennifer Buxton.
