= Bushey =

Town in Hertfordshire, England

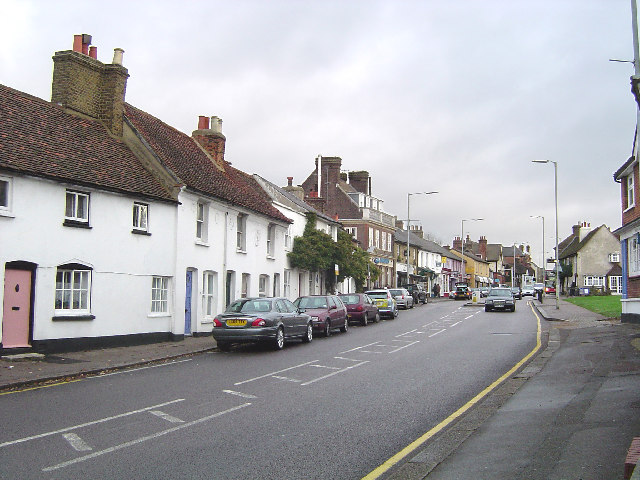
- Bushey High Street in 2005

- Location within Hertfordshire
- Population: 28,416 (2021 census, built-up area)
- OS grid reference: TQ132952
- District: Hertsmere
- Shire county: Hertfordshire
- Region: East
- Country: England
- Sovereign state: United Kingdom
- Post town: Bushey
- Postcode district: WD23
- Dialling code: 020, 01923
- Police: Hertfordshire
- Fire: Hertfordshire
- Ambulance: East of England
- UK Parliament: Hertsmere

Bushey is a town in the Hertsmere borough of Hertfordshire in the East of England. It had a population of 25,328 in the 2011 census, rising to 28,416 in the 2021 census, an increase of 12.19%. This makes Bushey the second most populated town in Hertsmere. Bushey Heath is a large neighbourhood south east of Bushey on the boundary with the London Borough of Harrow reaching elevations of 165 metres (541 ft) above sea level.

== Etymology ==
Bushey is first attested in the Domesday Book of 1086 in the form Bissei. Although there has been some debate, modern, scholarly commentary has concluded that the name originated as a compound of the Old English words bysc ('bush, thicket') and hæg ('enclosure'). Thus it once meant 'enclosure made of bushes'.

== History ==
The first written record of Bushey is its entry in the Domesday Book of 1086, which describes a small agricultural village named 'Bissei' (which later became 'Biss(h)e' and then 'Bisheye' during the 12th century). However, chance archaeological findings of Stone Age tools provide evidence that the area was inhabited as far back as the Palaeolithic period. The town also has links to the Roman occupation of Britain, with the main road running through it being Roman; sites of possible Roman villas being unearthed in the area; and a Roman tessellated pavement was discovered near Chiltern Avenue.

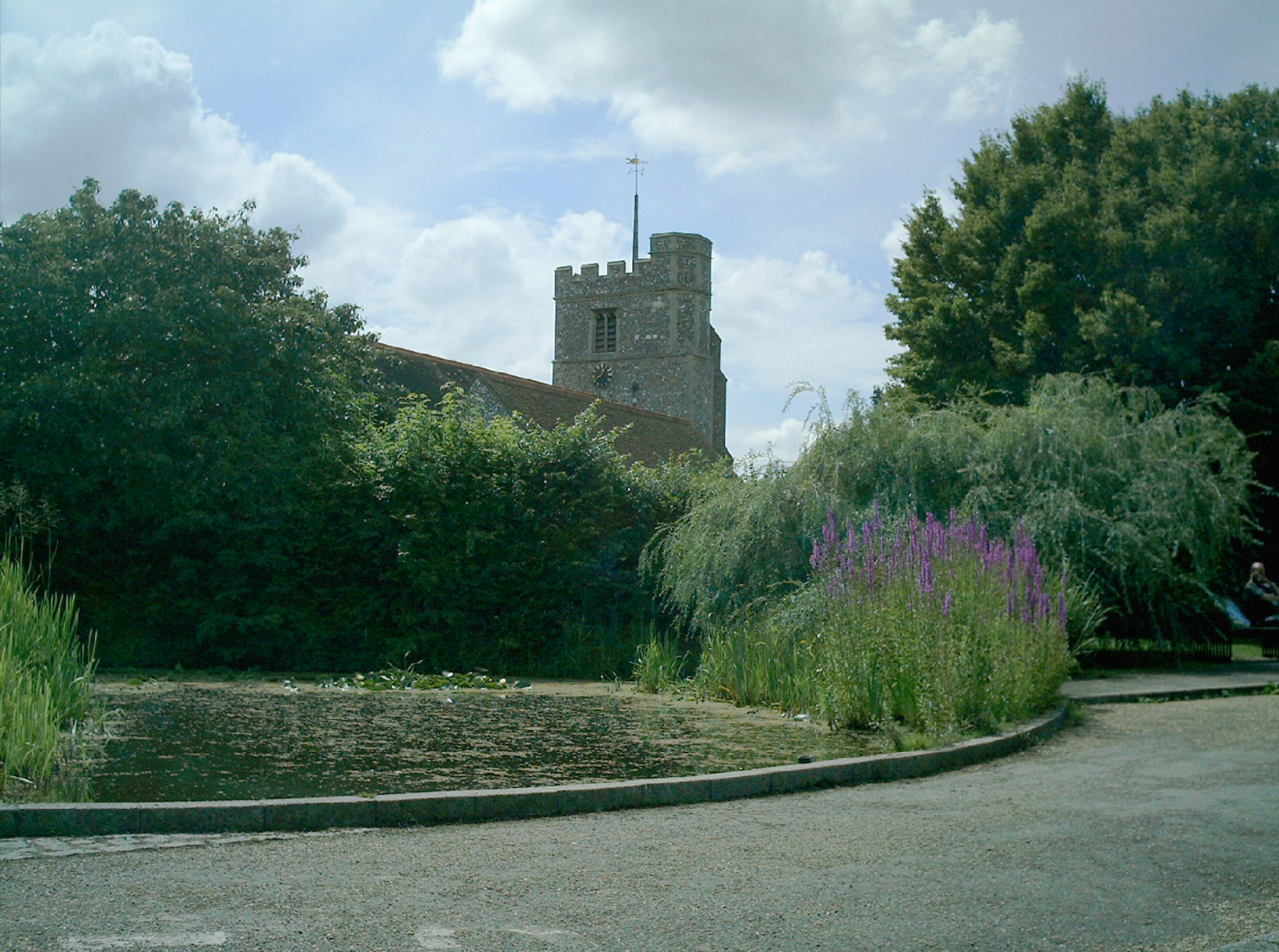
St. James's Church, Bushey

Bushey Heath's story begins in the Napoleonic Wars during a large food shortage. To help solve the problem, the government awarded the waste land to the east of Bushey to Bushey landowners to be used as farming; the land was more generally known as Bushey Common. Whilst the original aim was to produce food, being close to a railway and up to 500 ft above sea level with beautiful and broad views made the area attractive for housing developers.

The 19th and 20th centuries marked the time of most change in Bushey, especially between 1860 and 1960. The population rose 28-fold within 200 years, from 856 in 1801, to just under 24,000 today. The expansion was for many reasons, one of the main ones being due to the boom in industry caused by the railway in the early 20th century. A result was that many new jobs were created in and around Watford, and in the early 1920s, Bushey's first council houses were built. More housing was later built for the service families working in defence organisations in Stanmore and Northwood. The expansion eventually died down because much of the land in and around Bushey was protected under the Metropolitan Green Belt after the Second World War.

This same Green Belt legislation was also partly responsible for the abandonment of the pre-war Edgware to Bushey Heath extension as part of the Northern Heights programme of the Northern line underground railway. The Metropolitan Green Belt put great restrictions on new development, and the plan had been to use the new railway to stimulate new housing around the new route; without the new housing the route was deemed no longer viable. However, as work was advanced at the onset of war, the depot was completed for use as bomber manufacture, and following the Second World War and Green Belt coming into force, it was converted into the Aldenham bus depot (of Cliff Richard's Summer Holiday fame), which it remained until 1985, when it became derelict. It was redeveloped in 1996 and is now the Centennial Park Industrial Estate (51.639954°N 0.308561°W). Bushey Heath station would have been located at the intersection of Elstree Road and Northwestern Avenue (51.64245°N 0.3200°W). Conceptual plans existed in the 1903 Act of Parliament for an Edgware to Watford railway that would have seen the railway extended at a later date though Bushey village and on to Watford market, but even less came of that than the partially completed Edgware to Bushey Heath stretch. In the 1830s, the London and Birmingham Railway cut through the area between London and Watford though it did not initially serve Bushey. The railway passes to the north west of the town and crosses Bushey Arches Viaduct, an original feature dating from 1837.

The highest point in the historic county of Middlesex was in Bushey Heath on the border between Hertfordshire and Middlesex at the junction of the A4140 and the A409. At 153 m (502 ft) above sea level, the grid reference was TQ 152937.

=== Stories, legends and folklore ===
The lack of farming in Bushey Heath meant that it was a heavily wooded area up to the 18th century; this, added to the lack of street lighting and police, meant that Bushey Heath's history is full of tales of thieves, highwaymen and even murder. According to Grant Longman's Robberies on Bushey Heath, the road from Bushey Heath to Stanmore is said to be where the highwaymen lurked, ready to raid the dozen or so caravans that passed through Bushey Heath daily, carrying money from trade in London. Before venturing through the pass, parties of travellers and merchants would form at the Boot Inn at Edgware and the Three Crowns at Bushey Heath so they did not have to venture through the pass alone. Although one of the highwaymen responsible for the attacks is rumoured to have been the notorious Dick Turpin, evidence suggests that he was in fact more active in the region of Essex.

== Governance ==
Bushey has two tiers of local government, at district and county level: Hertsmere Borough Council and Hertfordshire County Council. There is no parish or town council in Bushey, which has been an unparished area since 1974.

Bushey
- Urban District
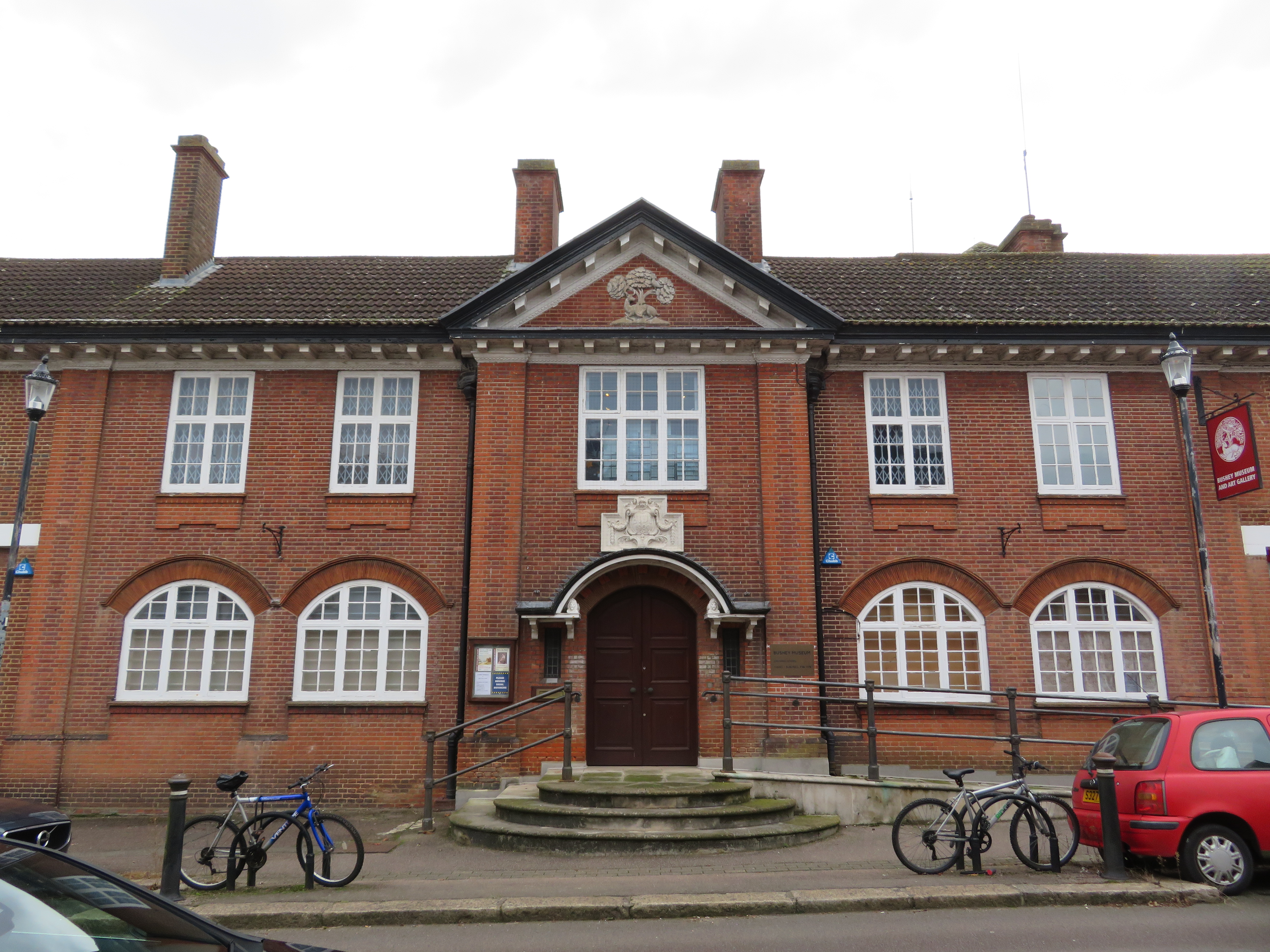
- Council offices, Rudolph Road, Bushey
- Population
  - 1911: 6,978
  - 1971: 22,830
- History
  - Created: 1 April 1906
  - Abolished: 31 March 1974
  - Succeeded by: Hertsmere
  - HQ: Council Offices, Rudolph Road, Bushey
- Contained within
  - County Council: Hertfordshire

Historically, Bushey was a parish in the hundred of Dacorum. Bushey was included in the Watford Poor Law Union from 1835. When the Watford Local Board of Health was established in 1850, its territory included a part of the parish of Bushey where the urban area of Watford crossed the parish boundary. Under the Local Government Act 1894 the Watford Local Board became Watford Urban District, and parishes that straddled urban district boundaries were divided. Bushey parish was therefore split with effect from 4 December 1894 into two parishes: "Bushey Urban" for the part of the parish within Watford Urban District and "Bushey Rural" for the remainder. Bushey Urban did not have its own parish council, being governed directly by Watford Urban District Council. Bushey Rural Parish Council held its first meeting on 2 January 1895 at Merry Hill School, with Edward Fithian being appointed the first chairman of the parish council. The parish of Bushey Rural was included in the Watford Rural District.

On 1 April 1906 the parish of Bushey Rural was renamed "Bushey" and was made an urban district, independent of the Watford Rural District. To avoid confusion, the separate parish of "Bushey Urban" within Watford Urban District was renamed "Oxhey" on the same day. The first meeting of Bushey Urban District Council was held on 16 April 1906 at Merry Hill School, with Richard Prowse being appointed the first chairman. The council built itself new offices and a fire station on Rudolph Road in Bushey, which were completed in 1909.

Bushey Urban District was abolished under the Local Government Act 1972, becoming part of the district of Hertsmere on 1 April 1974. No successor parish was created for Bushey, and so it became an unparished area. The council's former offices on Rudolph Road later became Bushey Museum & Art Gallery.

== Modern day ==
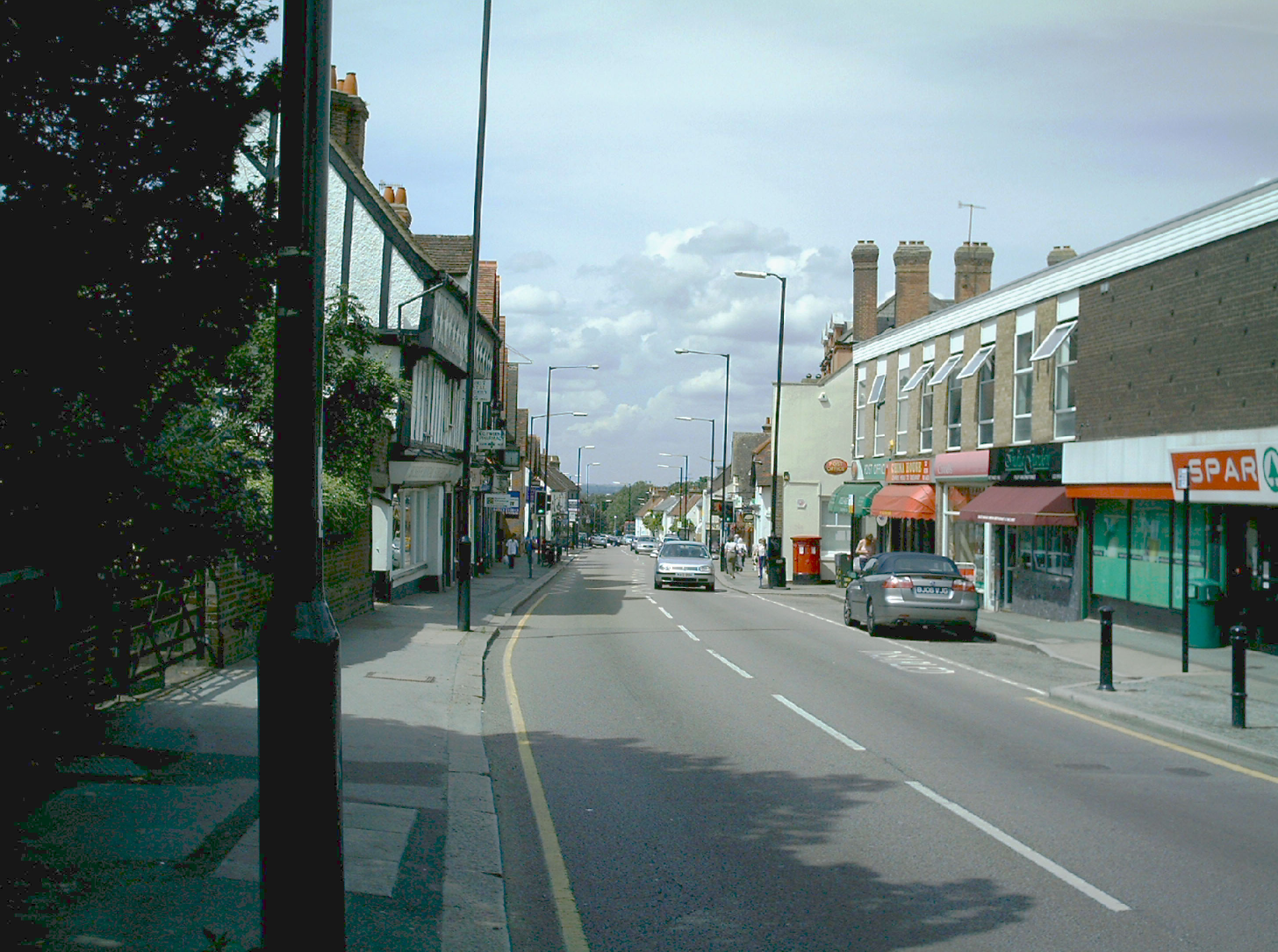
High Street, Bushey

Local events include the Bushey Festival and quarter marathon, held each July, and the Horticultural Society's flower and produce show.

Being located near several film studios at Elstree and Borehamwood, Bushey and Bushey Heath frequently feature as backdrops for many film and TV shows. Most notable is a bus scene in the Cannon and Ball film, and in the 1957 film Lucky Jim. Several historic buildings in Bushey, notably the old Royal Masonic School for Boys, later the International University, in the Avenue, have been used in films over a long period of time, including Nuns on the Run, Out of Bounds, Children of Men and Harry Potter. It has also been the set for several television comedy series, including Monty Python's Flying Circus and Little Britain. This site is currently being redeveloped for residential usage, with the 1960s additions to the site having been demolished.

Many of The Avengers episodes include location shots around the Bushey area, and the latter half of the Confessions of a Driving Instructor is entirely shot on the roads between Elstree and Bushey, finishing in the car dump at 'Bushey Breakers'.

Pupils from local schools including Bushey Hall and Bushey Meads have taken part as extras in productions such as My Dad's the Prime Minister.

Warren Lake, a duck pond on Bushey Heath, was restored in 1992 after falling into a poor state of repair.

== Religion ==
In 2021, Jews formed a plurality of the population in Bushey Heath ward. A majority (192 of 342) of those who came under 'Other' were Jains.

Area	All people	Christian (%)	Buddhist (%)	Hindu (%)	Jewish (%)	Muslim (%)	Sikh (%)	Other (%)	No religion (%)	Not stated (%)
England and Wales	56,490,048	46.3	0.5	1.8	0.5	6.7	0.9	0.6	36.7	6.0
Bushey	28,416	37.44	0.55	7.69	19.68	4.25	0.39	1.20	22.43	6.36

== Schools ==
The area contains a mix of primary schools and linked infants and junior schools (see schools in Bushey).

The state secondary schools are Queens' School, Bushey Meads School and The Grange Academy, of which the first two generally do well in comparison with other schools in the county. Bushey is also the site of the famous Purcell School, a school for young musicians well known for turning out many successful musicians. It was formerly the Royal Caledonian School. There are also two private girls' schools, St. Hilda's and St Margaret's in the area.

== Herkomer's Art School ==
Hubert Herkomer was a poor immigrant from Bavaria, who grew up in Southampton and studied art in London before moving to Bushey in 1874. His painting and portraits earned him fame and fortune, and he died in 1914 as Sir Hubert von Herkomer RA CVO. Herkomer had visited a friend who lived in Bushey in 1873, and returned to rent a pair of cottages and a studio near Melbourne Road. He founded Herkomer's Art School at Bushey in 1883, which, in its 21-year life, attracted some 500 students to the area, including artists Marguerite Frobisher, Lucy Kemp-Welch, William Nicholson, Algernon Talmage and Benjamin Haughton and Egyptologist Myrtle Broome,. Some of those students stayed after establishing their own studios. Their paintings are on display in the Bushey Museum. A street, Herkomer Road, was named in his memory.

At around 1888, he built Lululaund (51.643908°N 0.36065°W), a 'Bavarian castle', which was named after his second wife Lulu Griffiths. After being married for only a year she died. Lululaund dominated the Bushey skyline until 1939 when it was almost entirely demolished; a lot of the building was used as hardcore for Bovingdon Airfield, and much of the woodwork and carvings from the castle were burnt.

In 2014 the surviving remnant of Lululaund was converted into luxury apartments.

Sir Hubert is mainly remembered as an artist today, but in his time he was a polymath, becoming involved in some of the earliest film productions in Europe, and starting a series of races and time trials for cars in Germany.

In 1904 Herkomer closed his school and sold the building. The school was re-opened in 1905 on the same site by the artist Lucy Kemp-Welch as the Bushey School of Painting. In 1912 Herkomer bought back the school building and demolished it. A rose garden was laid out on the site to a design by T.H. Mawson. It is listed grade II on the Register of Parks and Gardens.

There is a gallery named after Kemp-Welch close to the village church. It is more usually used as a village hall today, with occasional exhibitions such as one in September 2006 by students from the Chelsea College of Art.

== Film studios ==
Bushey Film Studios in Melbourne Road were originally built by Hubert Herkomer and operated between 1913 and 1985. For much of its existence the studios focused on low-budget productions.

== Jewish cemeteries ==
There are two Jewish cemeteries, Old and New Cemeteries, both active, serving the north-west London Jewish communities. In 2018 an extension was built to provide for 50 further years of interment covering 16 acres (6.5 ha) of new landscaping and including prayer halls, offices and mortuary.

== Notable people ==
- R. D. Blackmore, novelist, lived briefly in Bushey
- Freddie Bunce, footballer
- Michael C. Burgess, actor, poet, activist and former editor
- Dave Cash, disc jockey, born in Bushey
- Helen Cherry, actress, died in Bushey, born in Worsley
- Peter Copley, actor, born in Bushey
- Oliver Dowden, Member of Parliament for Hertsmere
- John Gale, poker player
- Divina Galica, skier and racing driver, born in Bushey Heath
- Phil Gillies, Canadian politician, born in Bushey
- Hubert von Herkomer, artist, owner of Lululaund
- Shirlie Holliman, musician, of Pepsi & Shirlie, attended Bushey Meads School
- Tom Howard, Oscar-winning film special effects man, lived in Bushey from 1946 until his death in 1985
- Lucy Kemp-Welch, artist
- Simon Le Bon, musician, Duran Duran, born in Bushey
- Jonathan Lemon, cartoonist and musician, lived in Bushey, attended Queens' School
- A. E. Matthews, character actor, lived in Bushey until his death. He has a blue plaque in Little Bushey Lane.
- George Michael, musician, Wham!, attended Bushey Meads School
- Thomas Monro, Principal Physician of Bedlam and who attended on King George III in his last illness, settled his family here in the 19th century
- Ron Moulton, author and editor
- Tony O'Malley, musician, born in Bushey
- Josef Perl, Holocaust survivor, lived and was buried in Bushey
- Sid Phillips, musician, band leader, lived in Bushey Heath
- Simon Phillips, musician, drummer Toto, lived in Bushey Heath
- Roy Plomley, radio presenter, created Desert Island Discs whilst living in a cottage at Little Bushey Lane
- Michael Portillo, journalist, broadcaster and former politician, born in Bushey
- Peter Rachman, slum landlord
- Mark Ramprakash, cricketer, born in Bushey
- William Hurst Rees, surveyor
- Andrew Ridgeley, musician, Wham!, attended Bushey Meads School
- Michèle Roberts, writer
- Lady Marjorie Stopford Girl Guide leader, early Duke of Edinburgh Awards advisor, lived in Bushey from 1934 until her death in 1996.
- Gilbert Taylor, cinematographer, born in Bushey Heath
- Henry Wylde, conductor and musician

== Twin town ==
Bushey has been twinned with German town Landsberg am Lech in Bavaria (Southern Germany) for its historical link. To Landsberg belonged the native village, Waal, of artist Herkomer detailed above. The towns retain links for mayoral duties and school exchange trips.

== See also ==
- Bushey Hall
- Bushey Hall Golf Club
- Bushey Museum
- Bushey railway station
- RAF Bushey Hall

== Sources ==
- Youngs, FA (1991) [1981]. Guide to the Local Administrative Units of England. Vol. 1 (of 2). London: Royal Historical Society.
- William Page, ed. (1908). "Parishes: Bushey". A History of the County of Hertford: volume 2. Institute of Historical Research.
