= Lucy Kemp-Welch =

British painter

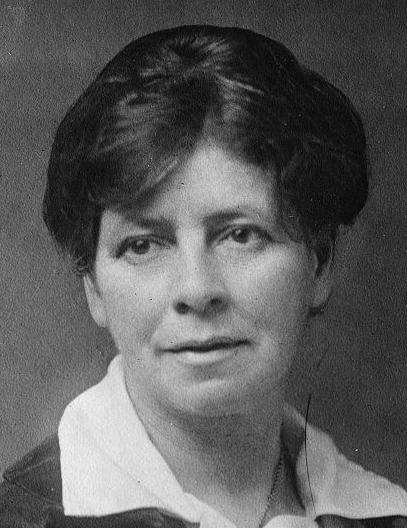
- Born: 20 June 1869; Bournemouth
- Died: 27 November 1958 (aged 89); Watford
- Education: The Herkomer School
- Known for: Equine artist

Lucy Elizabeth Kemp-Welch (20 June 1869 – 27 November 1958) was a British artist and teacher who specialized in painting horses. Though increasingly overlooked after the Second World War, she was, from the late 1890s to the mid-1920s one Britains's best-known female artists. Her obituary in The Times noted, "Like most artists who came to maturity and were established before the end of the nineteenth century, Lucy Kemp-Welch suffered somewhat in her later reputation from the violent changes in art which followed. In her prime as an animal painter she held a position in this country comparable to that of Rosa Bonheur in France, and the only British woman artist of her generation who was more talked about was Lady Elizabeth Butler, painter of The Roll Call." Her reputation has since revived, and she is best known today for her large paintings of wild and working horses in the New Forest, and those in military service which she produced during the First World War, as well as for her illustrations to the 1915 edition of Anna Sewell's novel Black Beauty.

== Biography ==
=== Early life ===
Lucy Kemp-Welch was born in Bournemouth, the first child of Edwin Buckland Kemp-Welch, a solicitor and amateur naturalist. She showed an early talent for art and exhibited for the first time when she was 14 years old. After attending a local art school, in 1892 she and her younger sister Edith moved to Bushey, Hertfordshire to study at Hubert von Herkomer’s art school. As one of Herkomer's best and most favoured students, she was able to set up her own studio in an old former inn known as 'Kingsley'. In 1905, Kemp-Welch took over the Herkomer School, and ran it until 1926, first as the Bushey School of Painting and then, after relocating it to premises in the garden of her own home, as the Kemp-Welch School of Animal Painting. After 1928 the school was run by Kemp-Welch's former assistant Lucy Marguerite Frobisher as the Frobisher School of Art.

While still a student, Kemp-Welch's painting Gypsy Drovers taking Horses to a Fair was shown at the Royal Academy in 1895. Kemp-Welch received further public recognition in 1897 when her painting Colt-Hunting in the New Forest was shown at the Royal Academy Summer Exhibition. The painting was purchased by the Chantrey Bequest for 500 guineas, and is now in the British national collection at the Tate. In total, throughout her career Kemp-Welch had 61 paintings displayed at the Royal Academy.

The success of Colt-Hunting in the New Forest led many to believe that Kemp-Welch would be elected to the Royal Academy. Although she was nominated at least twice, she was not elected. In 1902, she was elected to the Royal Society of British Artists alongside Louise Jopling, becoming with her the first women to be admitted. In 1914 she became president of the Society of Animal Painters. In 1915 she provided illustrations to an edition of Anna Sewell's Black Beauty, using Robert Baden-Powell's horse Black Prince as a model. She had previously illustrated Round About, A Brighton Coach Office by M E King in 1896 and The Marking of Mathias in 1897. As well as pictures of horses, Kemp-Welch painted other animals, flowers and landscapes. She also painted at least two Boer War scenes, In Sight: Lord Dundonald's dash on Ladysmith, 1901 (Royal Albert Memorial Museum, Exeter), and Sons of the City (private collection). Both of these featured horses in military action and led to several significant commissions for her during World War One.

=== World War One ===
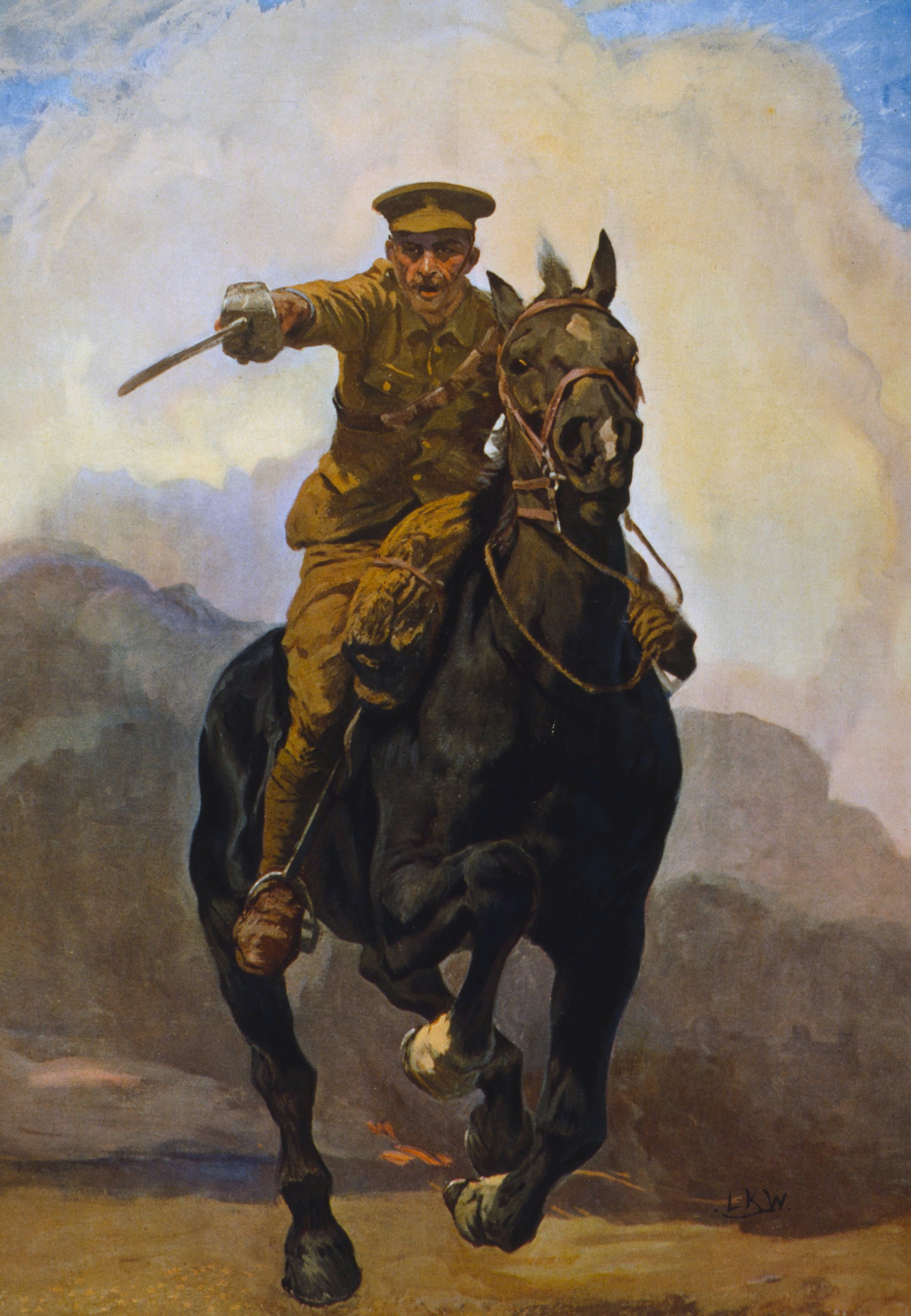
Artwork for Forward! Forward to Victory Enlist Now (1914)

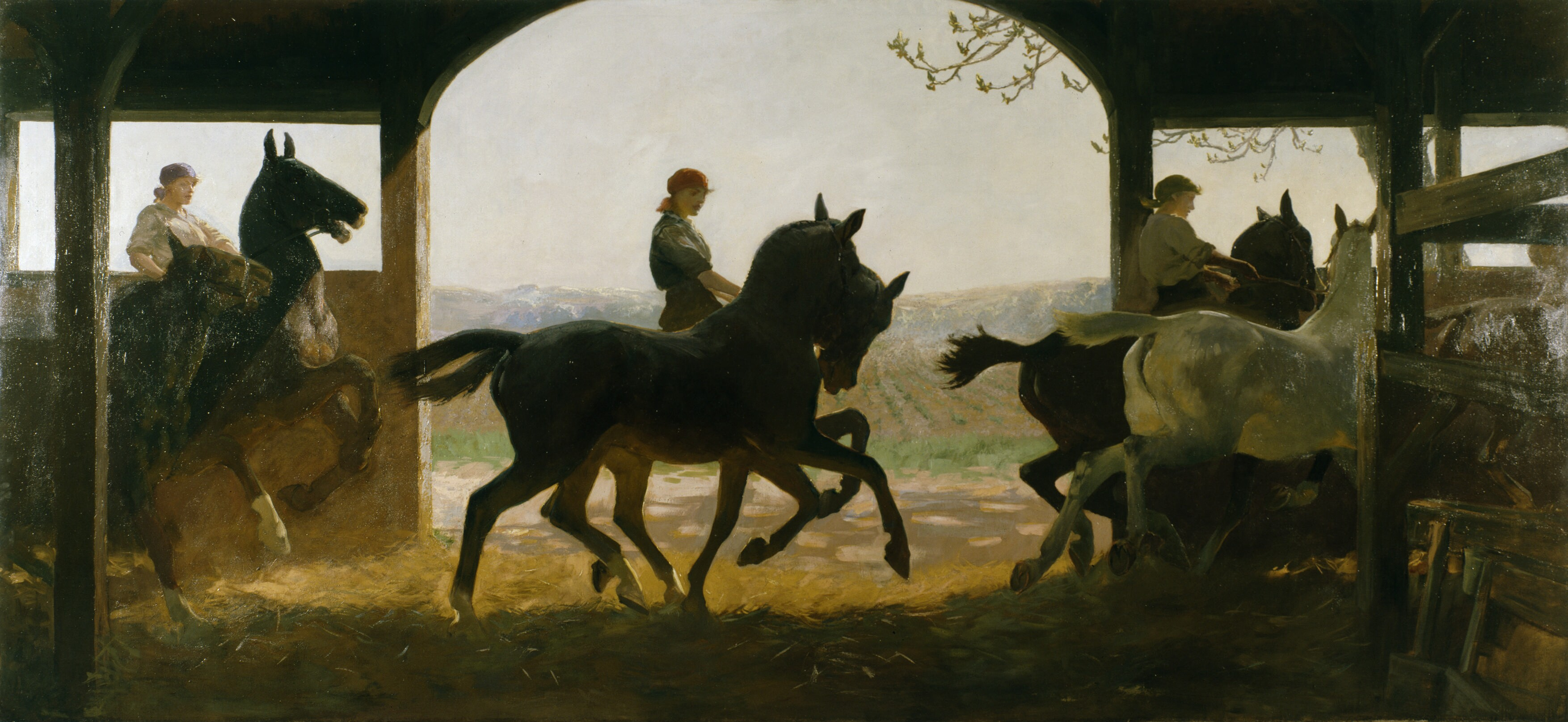
The Straw Ride – Russley Park Remount Depot, Wiltshire (Art.IWM ART3160)

In December 1914, Kemp-Welch was engaged by the British Parliamentary Recruiting Committee to paint the artwork for the famous army recruitment poster Forward! Forward to Victory Enlist Now, which she signed 'L.K.W 1914.'

During World War One, women were employed at Army Remount Depots in training and preparing horses for military service. Kemp-Welch was commissioned by the Women's Work Section of the Imperial War Museum to paint a scene at the largest such depot, one staffed entirely by women, at Russley Park in Wiltshire. The museum authorities were unhappy with the painting, The Ladies Army Remount Depot, Russley Park, Wiltshire, which Kemp-Welch first submitted but were aware of a larger and better composition on the same subject that she had painted and intended to sell to a private client for £1,000. Kemp-Welch agreed that the second painting, The Straw-Ride – Russley Park Remount Depot Wiltshire was the better of the two and agreed to sell it to the IWM to fulfil her commission. However, she was unable to agree a fee with the Women's Work Section and after protracted discussions, donated it to the museum.

In 1916, Kemp-Welch sought and was given permission to visit the Royal Field Artillery camp at Bulford on Salisbury Plain. The officer in command of the camp allowed her to set up an easel while eight batteries of horse artillery were continually ridden towards her so she could sketch the horse teams in movement at close quarters. These sketches resulted in two large works: The Leaders of a Heavy Gun Team, now in the Royal Artillery Institution, and Forward the Guns. These paintings were shown at the Royal Academy in 1917 and Forward the Guns was purchased by the Chantrey Bequest for the Tate. Although popular images at the time, these painting are not without their critics as they provided a heroic view of warfare which was at odds with the reduced role of horse artillery in an increasingly mechanised conflict.

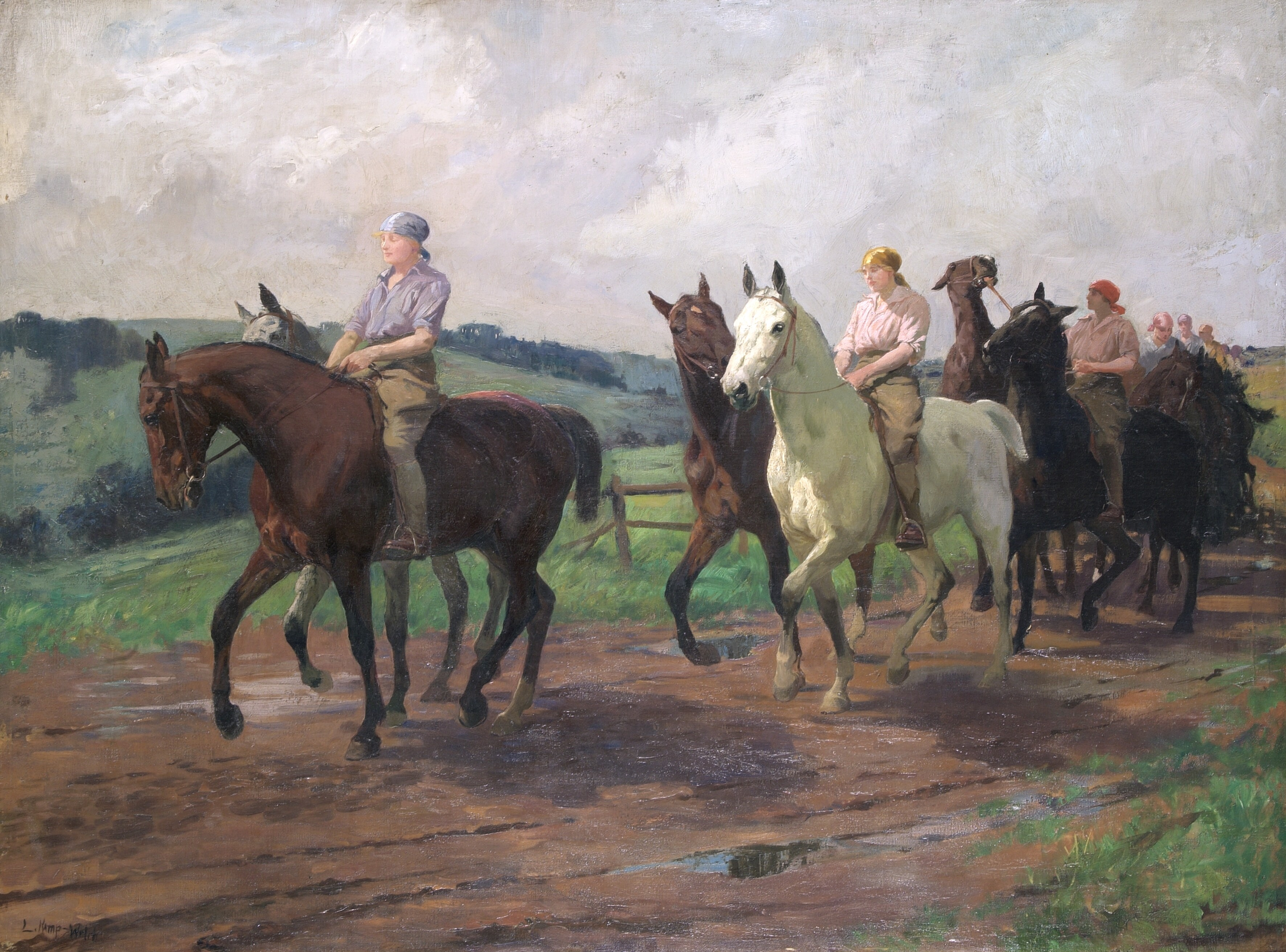
The Ladies' Army Remount Depot, Russley Park, Wiltshire (1918) (Art.IWM ART 3094)

As well as Bulford Camp, Kemp-Welch also made studies at several other Royal Artillery camps, notably several in Hampshire near Winchester. The resulting pictures included Big Guns to the Front, an image of shire horses pulling guns through a snowy landscape, which was shown to great acclaim at the Royal Academy in 1918 and was purchased for the National Museum of Wales in 1921.

=== Later life ===
In 1924, for the Royal Exchange, Kemp-Welch designed and completed a large panel commemorating the work of women during World War One. From 1926 onwards she focussed on depicting scenes of gypsy and circus life and spent several summers following Sanger's Circus, recording the horses.

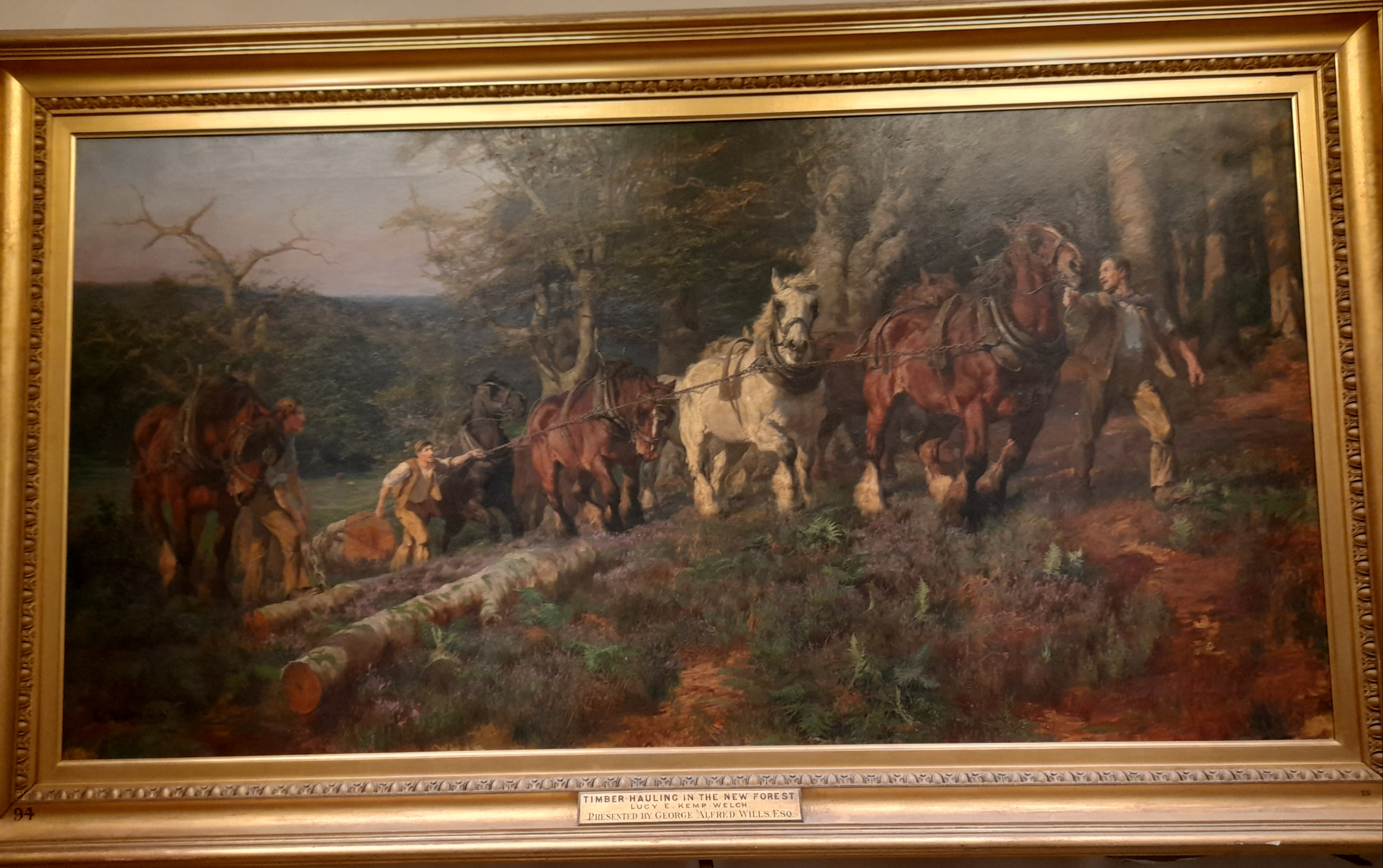
Timber-hauling in the New Forest, 1904, hanging on the stairs at Bristol City Art Gallery. Cat. no.K73

Kemp-Welch resided in Bushey, Hertfordshire for most of her life, never marrying. A major collection of her works is held by Bushey Museum. They include very large paintings of wild ponies on Exmoor, galloping polo ponies, the last horse-launched lifeboat being pulled into a boiling sea, heavy working horses pulling felled timber and hard-working farm horses trudging home at the end of the day.

The Lucy Kemp-Welch estate has been represented by Messum's Fine Art since 1975.

== Family ==
Lucy Kemp-Welch's younger sister Edith, was also an artist, and studied at Herkomer's school. She occasionally exhibited at the Royal Academy, and lived her adult life at 'Kingsley' with her sister, until her death from cancer in 1941. Their cousin Margaret Kemp-Welch (1874–1968) was also an artist, and likewise trained at Herkomer's School. In 1915 Edith produced a poster for the British war effort, featuring an image of Britannia with the slogan "Remember Scarborough," a reference to the shelling of the Yorkshire seaside town by German warships.

Lucy's live-in companion, Marguerite Frobisher, was buried with her when she died in 1958.
