= Tudor Hall =

Tudor Hall may refer to:

Places

- Tudor Hall (Bel Air, Maryland), listed on the NRHP in Maryland
- Tudor Hall (Leonardtown, Maryland), listed on the NRHP in Maryland
- Tudor Hall (Upper Fairmount, Maryland), listed on the NRHP in Maryland

Other

- Tudor Hall School, Banbury, a school in Banbury, Oxfordshire, England
- Tudor Hall School for Girls (Indianapolis, Indiana), now known as Park Tudor School
- Tudor Hall, Chipping Barnet, London, England. Original site of Queen Elizabeth's School, Barnet. Later part of Barnet and Southgate College
