= Watford Grammar School =

Watford Grammar School may refer to:

- Watford Grammar School for Boys
- Watford Grammar School for Girls
