= Aldenham School =

Location
- Elstree, Hertfordshire, WD6 3AJ; England; 51°39′48″N 00°19′40″W

Information
- Type: Public School; Private day and boarding
- Motto: In God Is All Our Trust
- Religious affiliation: Church of England
- Established: 1597; 429 years ago
- Founder: Richard Platt
- Department for Education URN: 117602 Tables
- Chair of Governors: Sarah Altman
- Head of Foundation: Alex Hems
- Gender: Coeducational
- Age: 3 to 18
- Enrolment: 700
- Houses: 7 houses McGill's, Paull's, Leeman's, Riding's, Kennedy's, Beevor's, Martineau's, Woodrow's
- Colours: Black and Gold
- Alumni: Old Aldenhamians
- Website: http://www.aldenham.com

Aldenham School is a co-educational independent day and boarding school for pupils aged 3 to 18, located between Elstree and the village of Aldenham in Hertfordshire, England. Founded in 1597 by Richard Platt, Master of the Worshipful Company of Brewers, the school operates under the umbrella of the Aldenham Foundation, which includes a preparatory school and international campuses.

== History ==
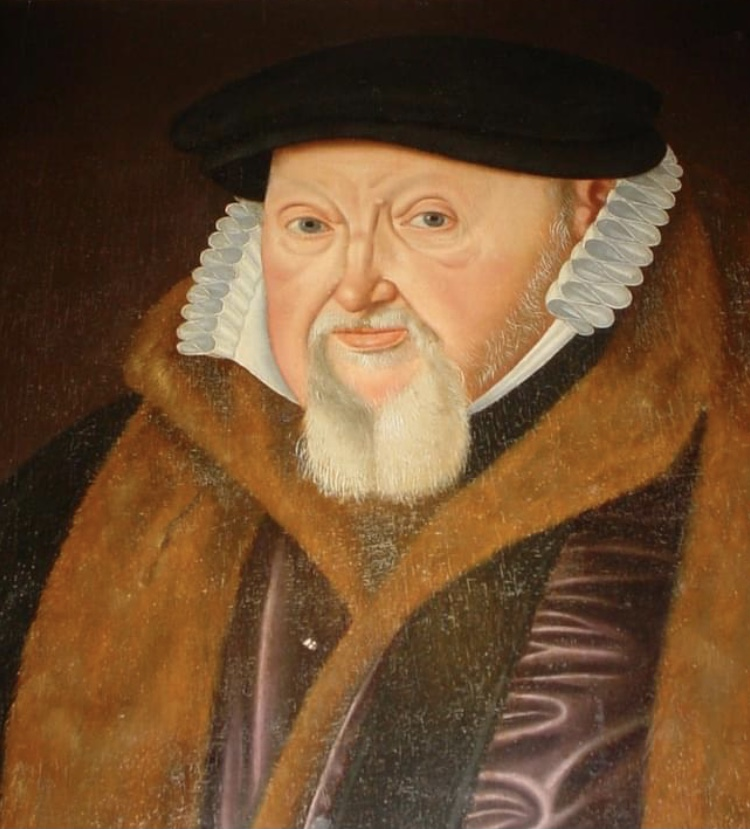
Richard Platt in 1600

The school was established in 1597 by Richard Platt, an alderman and brewer who obtained letters patent from Queen Elizabeth I in 1596 to build a free grammar school and almshouses. Before his death in 1600, Platt placed the school's administration under a covenant with the Worshipful Company of Brewers..

In the early 19th century an investigation by the Education Charities Commission of the Poor led to the Tudor Grammar School being demolished and replaced by two new schools: a lower school providing an elementary education for the local population, and a grammar school for fee paying boarders.

In the late 1860s, the Platt estate in St Pancras, which provided the endowment of the school, was compulsorily purchased for the construction of St Pancras railway station, and the Midland Railway had to pay compensation of £91,000, equivalent to £9,370,000 in 2025. In a measure described by the headmaster of the time as "a violent act of confiscation", the Endowed Schools Commissioners, acting under the Endowed Schools Act 1869, diverted more than half of this money to other schools. In their scheme approved in 1875, £20,000 went to the North London Collegiate School and Camden School for Girls, £13,333 6s 8d to support secondary education in Watford (see § History), £10,000 to Russell Lane School, Southgate, and £8,000 to two elementary schools: Medburn School, Radlett, and Delrow School, Aldenham.

The school expanded during the 20th century, and in the 1970s girls were admitted, thus paving the way for the school to become fully co-educational.

A new Sixth Form Centre was opened in 2012 providing study and recreation facilities for Sixth Formers under one roof.

In the summer of 2016, restorations were carried out on Beevor's and McGill's House, improving and updating the boarding facilities. Owing to the increasing number of girls in the school, in September 2017 Riding's House became a girls' day house.

== Academic results ==
The 2024 Department for Education figures, which refer to pupils who completed key stage 4, show that the percentage of pupils who achieved "attainment 8" was 42.1%. The percentage for the local authority average was 50.2% and the England average (including state as well as fee-paying schools) was 45.9%

== Houses ==
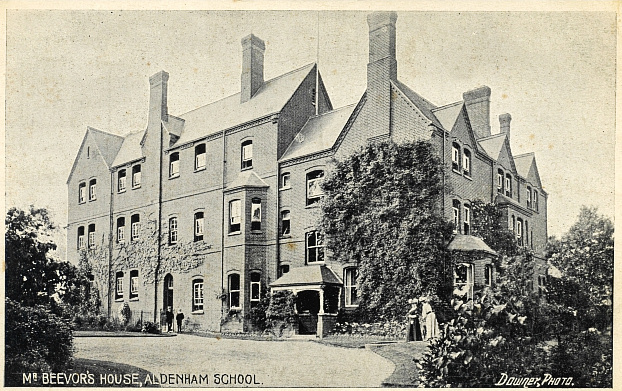
Beevor's House c.1910

McGill's House

Aldenham has six senior houses and two junior houses.

Aldenham School operates a house system, with students divided into six senior houses and two junior houses.

- Beevor's, senior, boarding boys and day boys
- McGill's, senior, boarding boys and day boys
- Kennedy's, senior, boarding boys and day boys
- Paull's, senior, boarding and day girls
- Riding's, senior, formerly day boys, now day girls
- Leeman's, senior, day boys
- Martineau's, junior boarding and day, boys and girls.
- Woodrow's, junior day boys and girls

== Arts and culture ==
=== Arts ===
Art: In 1958, a painting titled The Crucifixion by Sir Stanley Spencer was commissioned for the school chapel by the Master of the Brewers Company. The artwork was later auctioned at Sotheby's in 1993 for £1.3 million.

=== Film and Television ===
The school's facilities, including its main dining hall, served as filming locations for Lindsay Anderson's 1968 film If...., as well as scenes in Tom Brown's Schooldays (2005 film) and Greed (2019 film).

== Quatercentenary ==
In 1997, Aldenham celebrated its 400th anniversary. The school was visited during the year by The Princess Royal, who came to open the new artificial turf pitch that had been built as a result of money raised by the appeal.

== Influence on football ==
Aldenham School played a significant early role in the formalization of football rules in 19th-century England. In 1825, the school documented its own set of written football rules, placing it among the earliest public schools alongside Eton College to codify the game prior to the establishment of the Football Association in 1863.

== Masters ==
Before the school was rebuilt and enlarged in 1824, the head of the school was known as the Master. The founder, Richard Platt, arranged that when there was a vacancy, St John's College, Cambridge, was to nominate three Masters of Arts, from whom the Brewers' Company would appoint one.

- Thomas Neale (1598–1623)
- Roland Greenwood (1623–1634)
- Christopher Smyth (1634–1643)
- Robert Cresswell (1643–1648)
- Jeremy Collier (1648–1653)
- William Elliot (1653–1663)
- Andrew Campion (1663–1673)
- William Swayne (1673–1678)
- Randolph Nicoll (1678–1703)
- John Button (1703–1703)
- Francis Thompson (1703–1714)
- Allen Allenson (1714–1738)
- Gilber Allenson (1738–1757)
- William Ellis (1757–1767)
- Joseph Cantrell (1767–1774)
- Samuel White (1774–1785)
- Rice Hughes (1785–1792)
- John Griffin (1792–1799)
- Methusalem Davies (1800–1823)
- Joseph Summersby (1823–1825)

== Heads of Aldenham School (later, The Aldenham Foundation) ==
- Jonathan Wilkinson (1824–1833)
- Richard Foster (1834–1836)
- Thomas Spyers (1836–1842)
- Alfred Leeman (1843–1876)
- John Kennedy (1877–1899)
- Alfred Cooke (1900–1920)
- Harvey Beck (1920–1933)
- George Riding (1933–1949)
- Peter Mason (1949–1961)
- Paul Griffin (1962–1974)
- Peter Boorman (1974–1983)
- Michael Higginbottom (1983–1994)
- Stephen Borthwick(1994–2000)
- Richard Harman (2000–2006)
- James Fowler (2006–2022)
- Alex Hems (2022–current)

== Notable alumni ==
- Sir Samuel Wilks, FRS, (1824–1911), physician and pathologist.
- William Josiah Sumner Hammersley (1826–1886), journalist, sportsman, co-founder of Australian rules football
- Colonel Sir Robert Edis (1839–1927), architect
- Frank Cowper (1849–1930), yachtsman, writer and illustrator
- Sir Alfred Gilbert (1854–1934), sculptor and goldsmith
- Sir William Laird Clowes (1856–1905), naval writer
- Stanley Owen Buckmaster, 1st Viscount Buckmaster (1861–1934), politician, judge and Lord Chancellor, 1915–1916
- Arnold McNair, 1st Baron McNair (1885–1975), legal scholar, judge of the International Court of Justice, 1946–1959, and first President of the European Court of Human Rights (1959–1965)
- Sir Wallace Akers (1888–1954), chemist and Director of Research, ICI, 1944–1953
- Arthur Jaques (1888–1915), cricketer
- Leo Reid (1888–1938), cricketer
- Sir Clifford Monmohan Agarwala (1890–1972), Chief Justice of Indian High Court
- Sir Kenneth Pickthorn, 1st Baronet (1892–1975), historian, politician, and President of Corpus Christi College, Cambridge, 1937–1944
- Group Captain Ernest Fawcus (1895–1966), cricketer and military officer
- Colonel Dennis Edward Francis Waight MC (1895–1984), professional soldier and World War I flying ace
- General Sir Richard Gale (1896–1982), General Officer Commanding 6th Airborne Division, 1943–1945, GOC I Airborne Corps, 1945, and Commander-in-Chief, British Army of the Rhine, 1952–1956
- James Mardall (1899–1988), first-class cricketer and British Army officer
- Thomas Rice Henn (1901–1974), literary scholar and writer
- Lawrence P. Williams (1905–1996), film production designer
- Raleigh Ashlin Skelton (1906–1970), cartographical historian
- Geoffrey Longfield (1909–1943), first-class cricketer and Royal Air Force officer
- Jack de Manio (1914–1988), radio broadcaster
- John Blake MC (1917–1944), first-class cricketer and Royal Marines officer
- John Debenham Taylor (1920–2016), Secret Intelligence Service officer
- Sir Michael Kerr (1921–2002), High Court Judge and Lord Justice of Appeal
- Flying Officer Leslie Thomas Manser VC (1922–1942), RAF officer and bomber pilot, awarded a posthumous Victoria Cross for saving the lives of his crew.
- Sir Denys Roberts (born 1923), Colonial Secretary of Hong Kong, 1973–1978, and Chief Justice of Hong Kong, 1978–1988
- Churton Fairman, known as Mike Raven (1924–1997), radio disc jockey, author, actor and artist
- David Blake (1925–2015), first-class cricketer
- Peter Haigh (1925–2001), BBC Television presenter
- Colonel Sir Michael McCorkell (1925–2006), Northern Irish soldier
- Sir Kenneth Warren (1926–2019), politician
- Sir David Mitchell (1928–2014), politician
- Geoffrey Hewlett Thompson (born 1929), Bishop of Exeter, 1985–1999
- Field Marshal Richard Vincent, Baron Vincent of Coleshill (1931–2018), Chief of the Defence Staff, 1991–1992
- Robert St Clair Grant (1932–2003), comedian, writer and actor.
- Al-Sultan Abdullah (born 1959), 6th King of Malaysia
- Tuanku Muhriz ibni Almarhum Tuanku Munawir (born 1948), 11th Yang Di Pertuan Besar Negeri Sembilan
- Peter Dawes, Bishop of Derby, 1988–1995
- Sir Hugh Laddie (1946–2008), High Court Judge
- Sir Martin Sweeting, Director of the Surrey Space Centre and chief executive officer of Surrey Satellite Technology Ltd
- Dale Winton (1955–2018), television presenter, BBC Radio 2 broadcaster
- Daniel Chatto (born 1957), actor turned artist; husband of Lady Sarah Armstrong-Jones
- Adrian Nicholas (1962–2005), skydiver
- Marcus Buckingham (born 1966), author and motivational speaker
- Baroness Karren Brady (born 1969), Managing Director of West Ham United FC
- Leo Green (born 1972), British musician and broadcaster
- Matt Wallace (born 1990), Professional golfer
- Charlie Patino (born 2003), LaLiga2 footballer
- Myles Lewis-Skelly (born 2006), Premier League and England footballer
