= Hendon College =

Hendon College may refer to:

- Hendon College of Technology, a former college that is now a part of Middlesex University
- Hendon College, a former college of further education that merged with Barnet College in 2000
- Hendon Police College, a police training college
