= Richard Platt =

Richard Platt may refer to

- Richard Platt (writer) (born 1953), English writer
- Richard Platt (brewer) (died 1600), master brewer and philanthropist
- Richard Platt (military officer) (1754–1830), American soldier

== See also ==
- Dick Platt, English footballer
