= The History Boys (film) =

2006 film by Nicholas Hytner

- Cinema poster
- Directed by: Nicholas Hytner
- Written by: Alan Bennett
- Based on: The History Boys by Alan Bennett
- Produced by: Damian Jones; Kevin Loader; Nicholas Hytner
- Starring: Richard Griffiths; Frances de la Tour; Stephen Campbell Moore; Clive Merrison
- Cinematography: Andrew Dunn
- Edited by: John Wilson
- Music by: George Fenton
- Production companies: DNA Films; BBC Films; UK Film Council; National Theatre
- Distributed by: Fox Searchlight Pictures
- Release date: 13 October 2006
- Running time: 112 minutes
- Country: United Kingdom
- Language: English
- Budget: £2 million
- Box office: $11.2 million

The History Boys is a 2006 British comedy-drama film adapted by Alan Bennett from his 2004 play, which won the 2005 Olivier Award for Best New Play and the 2006 Tony Award for Best Play. It was directed by Nicholas Hytner, who directed the original production at the Royal National Theatre in London, and features the original cast of the play.

The school scenes were filmed in Watford in two schools, Watford Grammar School for Boys and Watford Grammar School for Girls. The film uses the uniform of Watford Boys. Locations in Elland and Halifax, West Yorkshire, are used to create the broader landscape of Sheffield in which the story is set.

Bennett’s book Keeping On Keeping On, which consists of his diaries from 2005 to 2015 with a few other essays, contains a chapter, “The History Boys, Film Diary”, in which Bennett records his experiences and reflections during, and shortly after, the making of the film. This diary starts on 14 July 2005 and continues with entries every few days up to 24 August, followed by the final entry on 1 November 2005.

== Plot ==
In 1983 at a boys' grammar school in Sheffield, eight sixth-form students – Crowther, Posner, Dakin, Timms, Akthar, Lockwood, Scripps and Rudge – have achieved the school's best-ever A-Level results and are preparing for a seventh-term entrance examination in History in hopes of winning places at Oxford or Cambridge. Their well-liked General Studies teacher, known as "Hector", teaches alongside their deputy head and History teacher, Mrs Lintott. The ambitious headmaster, "Felix", hires a young temporary tutor, Tom Irwin, to sharpen the boys' exam technique. Irwin is only slightly older than his pupils, but proves exacting and hard to impress; he is also evasive about his own education, implying he attended Oxford despite not having studied there.

In Hector's classes, the boys act out scenes from romantic films and literature, and his unorthodox, affectionate teaching style has made him a favourite. Outside the classroom, however, Hector routinely offers one student a lift home on his motorbike and is known to grope them during the ride, behaviour staff and boys initially treat as a joking "eccentricity". The only boy he does not take is Posner, a sensitive Jewish student who openly nurses a crush on Dakin. Dakin – confident, flirtatious and self-described as a budding lecher – is having an affair with the headmaster's secretary, Fiona. While Dakin enjoys Posner's attention, he becomes increasingly fascinated by Irwin, and his attempts to impress the tutor intellectually shift into a flirtatious, potentially sexual pursuit. Irwin, attracted but repressed, reacts with a mixture of confusion and excitement. Meanwhile, Hector's misconduct is brought into the open, and Felix pressures him to "retire early".

Despite the turmoil, the boys sit their exams and all gain places at Oxford or Cambridge, including the seemingly dim Rudge. Posner wins a scholarship and Dakin receives an exhibition. When they reconvene at school to share the news, Dakin confronts Irwin about his earlier claims of being at Oxford. Irwin admits he studied at Bristol and attended Oxford for only a teaching diploma. Dakin then asks him out for a drink, making his sexual interest explicit; Irwin is flustered but agrees to meet him on Sunday.

Dakin also threatens Felix with exposing his harassment of Fiona, forcing the headmaster to reinstate Hector. As the boys prepare to leave the school, Hector – who is staying on – offers Dakin a final motorbike ride "for old times' sake". Felix intervenes, insisting Hector should not take a student and urging him to take Irwin instead. Dakin hands Irwin the helmet and they ride off as the boys wave, laughing.

Off-screen, the motorbike is involved in an accident. Hector is killed and Irwin survives with a broken leg; Dakin later says Irwin's inexperience on the back of a bike may have unbalanced Hector, and that their planned Sunday meeting never happened.

At Hector's memorial, the boys sing "Bye Bye, Blackbird"and Felix delivers a eulogy. Mrs Lintott quietly wonders whether anyone will attend her own funeral. In the school hall, the former pupils reflect on their futures: Akthar becomes a headmaster; Crowther a magistrate; Timms a drug-taking owner of a dry-cleaning chain; Dakin a prosperous tax lawyer; Lockwood, an army officer, is killed by friendly fire at 28; Rudge becomes a builder; Scripps a journalist; and Irwin makes television history programmes. Posner becomes a teacher, adopting Hector's inspirational approach without the touching. The film ends on a remembered group photograph from their trip to Fountains Abbey, with Hector's voice urging them to "pass it on".

== Cast ==
Staff

- Richard Griffiths as Douglas "Hector", English & General Studies teacher
- Clive Merrison as Felix, the Headmaster and Geography teacher
- Frances de la Tour as Mrs Dorothy Lintott, History teacher & Deputy Headteacher
- Stephen Campbell Moore as Irwin, a temporary History teacher who encourages pupils to dissent from generally accepted viewpoints.
- Penelope Wilton as Mrs Hazel Bibby, Art and Art History teacher
- Adrian Scarborough as Mr Stanley Wilkes, Physical Education teacher
- Georgia Taylor as Fiona, school secretary

Students

- Samuel Anderson as Christopher "Chris" Crowther
- Samuel Barnett as David Posner, a Jewish boy who believes that he may be gay.
- Dominic Cooper as Stuart Dakin
- James Corden as Anthony "Tony" Timms
- Sacha Dhawan as Adi Akthar
- Andrew Knott as James "Jimmy" Lockwood
- Russell Tovey as Peter Rudge
- Jamie Parker as Donald "Donnie" Scripps

The majority of the main cast later appeared in Bennett's 2015 film The Lady in the Van, with de la Tour in a prominent role and cameo roles for Moore, Anderson, Barnett, Cooper, Corden, Dhawan, Knott, Tovey and Parker. Griffiths died in 2013, before The Lady in the Van was shot.

== Reception ==
=== Critical reviews ===
Richard Schickel of Time opined that the film is better than the original play. He explained that the transformation to film improved the "flow and intimacy" of the production, while preserving the messages it seeks to convey. Rolling Stone notes that some sense of familiarity with the subject of the film is lost in the cutting of nearly an hour from the original play, but the dialogue remains witty and pointed as is the customary style of the author. New York describes the film as "brilliant and infectious", and filled with Alan Bennett's customary deadpan humour.

=== Controversy ===
The play did receive some criticism and controversy around the character of Hector, a teacher who molests the students. Nick Clark of The Independent wrote, "Bennett raised eyebrows with his sympathetic portrayal of Hector, the teacher forced to step down for fondling his teenage pupils". In a 2006 interview with David Batty of The Guardian, he described Bennett as "laugh[ing] off any suggestion he is condoning paedophilia." Bennett stated, "The boys are all consenting adults, and Hector's behaviour is very unthreatening. The boys all consider him to be a bit of a joke and just tolerate it as part of the price of his eccentric teaching style. I didn't write in his death to redeem his transgression, I did it to make the drama work." In 2013 Bennett revealed he was "interfered with as a child but was not greatly affected by the experience".

David Batty of The Guardian strongly criticised the film, stating he "came away bristling with annoyance at its romanticised portrayal of Hector, a teacher who serially gropes the teenage boys in his study group." He found the situation "bizarre and unsatisfactory," adding, "What's the message Bennett's trying to convey here? That it's OK for teachers to molest their pupils as long as they help them get into Oxford or Cambridge? Or is the audience meant to excuse Hector's behaviour on the grounds that he grew up in an age when homosexuality was repressed...Whatever the intention, the misty-eyed, nostalgic tone seems totally unsuited to addressing such a thorny topic."

== Awards ==
The National Board of Review of Motion Pictures named The History Boys one of the Top Ten Films in its 2006 awards.

The film was nominated for the 2007 GLAAD Media Award for Outstanding Film – Limited Release.

Griffiths and de la Tour received BAFTA nominations for Best Actor and Best Supporting Actress, respectively.

== Soundtrack ==
Title	Performed by
"L'Accordéoniste"	Samuel Barnett, Jamie Parker
"Bewitched"	Samuel Barnett, Jamie Parker
"Now Voyager"	Jamie Parker
Rachmaninov: Piano Concerto No. 2 in C Minor – Adagio sostenuto	Jamie Parker
"Wish Me Luck (As You Wave Me Goodbye)"	Cast
"Bye Bye Blackbird"	Samuel Barnett, Jamie Parker, cast
"Wish Me Luck (As You Wave Me Goodbye)"	Gracie Fields
"Blue Monday"	New Order
"This Charming Man"	The Smiths
"Mustapha Dance"	The Clash
"Never Stop (Discothèque)"	Echo & the Bunnymen
"A Forest"	The Cure
"Papa's Got a Brand New Pigbag"	Pigbag
"Bewitched"	Rufus Wainwright
