= Elizabeth Fuller =

Elizabeth Fuller may refer to:

- Elizabeth Fuller (school founder), English school founder
- Elizabeth Fuller (illustrator) (born 1957), New Zealand children's book illustrator
- Liz Fuller (born 1975), Welsh television presenter, actress, model, and media personality
