= International Fundraising Consultancy =

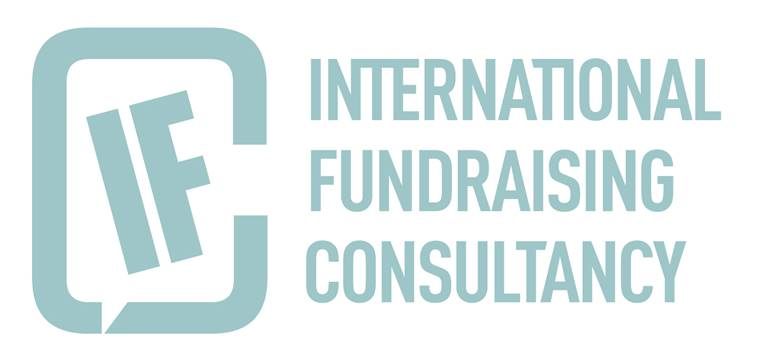
- Founded: 2000
- Location: London, United Kingdom
- Region served: Worldwide
- Website: www.groupifco.com

The International Fundraising Consultancy. also known as IFCo, is a global management, communication and fundraising consultancy for civil society, with 15 offices around the world.

== History ==
International Fundraising Consultancy was the brainchild of John Baguley, Jasvir Kaur and Chris Small, who wanted to use their fundraising and management skills to help civil society. It was registered as a company in 2000 with equal share ownership. Small has since left the International Fundraising Consultancy, leaving Baguley and Kaur as co-owners and directors until 2016, when Kaur also left and Bill King and Sarah Gray became co-owners alongside Baguley.

Today, John Baguley remains as Chair of the Board. Bill King is now the Chief Executive Officer with Sarah Gray as the third Director. Internationally IFCo has expanded from the UK to open offices around the world including the US, Canada, Peru, France, Ireland, Italy, Switzerland, Ukraine, Kyrgyzstan, India, Singapore, Nigeria, Kenya and Tanzania.

== Activity ==
In 2016 IFCo began its Top Table free business breakfast service, bringing together Fundraising Directors, bi-monthly, to discuss issues and trends in fundraising. Initially face-to-face in London't iconic Gherkin Tower, these meetings moved online during the COVID-19 lockdowns, and have remained there.

In 2017 it began Fundraising TV on YouTube. This is a series of interviews and talks on current fundraising issues in a magazine format.

IFCo has also supported fundraising innovation, for example helping Barnet and Southgate College to open a centre dedicated to learners with learning difficulties and disabilities.

IFCo helped the Black Cultural Archives to complete their capital appeal to establish their first centre in Windrush Square, London.

In 2016 IFCo also helped the National Army Museum to complete its capital appeal to completely renovate its museum in Chelsea.

IFCo has been noted for its work in areas of fundraising including viral fundraising, corporate fundraising, and capital appeals, including viral fundraising, corporate fundraising and its ethical and legal considerations, and capital appeals.

In 2016 John Baguley was awarded a Lifetime Contribution Award from the Institute of Fundraising

== Awards ==
- Better Society Awards 2020, 2022 and 2023 - Best Consultancy
- Charity Times Awards 2017 - Shortlisted in the Advisory Provider of the Year category.
- Nominated for ‘Advisory Provider of the Year’ Charity Times 2016Charity Times Awards – Consultancy of the Year 2015
- Charity Times Awards – Consultancy of the Year 2015
- Institute of Fundraising – Best Strategic/Fundraising Consultancy 2014: Winner
- Institute of Fundraising - Best Strategic/Fundraising Consultancy 2013: Winner
- Institute of Fundraising Awards 2015- Shortlisted in the 'Best Strategic/Fundraising Consultancy' category.

== Publications ==
- Baguley, J. (2001) Successful Fundraising. A fundraising handbook for NGOs published by Bibliotek Books in 1996, and an Open University recommended text. Revised and updated for the second edition in 2001. It is also published in Russian.
- Mordaunt, J & Paton, R, Eds (2006) Thoughtful Fundraising. Two chapters commissioned from J Baguley: Know Your Donors & Fundraising Campaigns
- Baguley, J. (2006) Choosing & Using Consultants. Published by Wiremill Publications.
- Baguley, J. (2006) Direct Mail Fundraising. Published by Wiremill Publications.
- Baguley, J. (2009) The Globalisation of Non-Governmental Organisations: Drivers and Stages. Published by VDM Verlag
- Baguley, J. (2014) My Generation: Why Age Affects Everything
- Baguley, J. (2015) Successful Capital Appeals: How Boomers Changed the Rules
- Baguley, J. (2016) Successful Major Donor Fundraising: How Boomers Changed the Rules
- Baguley, J. (2017) Fundraising and Zombies: A Guide to Charity Management. Published by Matador
