= Watford Grammar School for Boys =

School in Watford, Hertfordshire, England

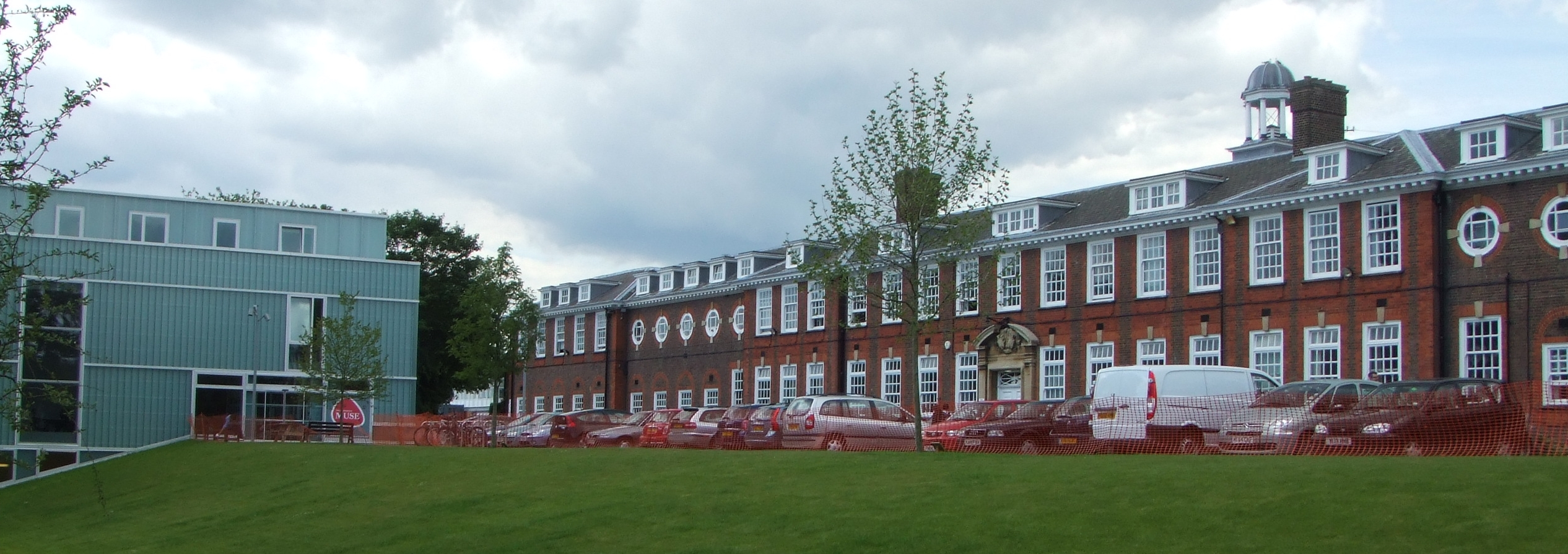
- School badge The Clarendon Muse (left) and main block

Location
- Rickmansworth Road; Watford, Hertfordshire, WD18 7JF; England; 51.6550°N 0.4143°W

Information
- Type: 11–18 boys partially selective academy
- Motto: Latin: Sperate Parati; Go Forward with Preparation
- Religious affiliation: Church of England
- Established: 1704; 322 years ago 1884 (Single-sex)
- Founder: Elizabeth Fuller
- Department for Education URN: 136276 Tables
- Ofsted: Reports
- Chairman of Governors: Paul Shearring
- Headmaster: Ian A. Cooksey
- Gender: Boys
- Age: 11 to 18
- Enrolment: 1,244
- Houses: Bushey; Cassio; Fuller; Groves; New; Platt; Rée; Turner
- Colour
- Publication: The Fullerian
- Former pupils: Old Fullerians
- Website: www.watfordboys.org

Watford Grammar School for Boys (commonly abbreviated as WBGS) is an 11–18 boys academy in Watford in Hertfordshire, England. The school and its sister school, Watford Grammar School for Girls, descend from a Free School founded as a charity school for boys and girls by Elizabeth Fuller in 1704.

Approximately a third of students are selected for academic or musical aptitude, and brothers of existing pupils are also guaranteed places. Its results are among the highest achieved by non-grammar schools in England.

== History ==
=== Establishment ===
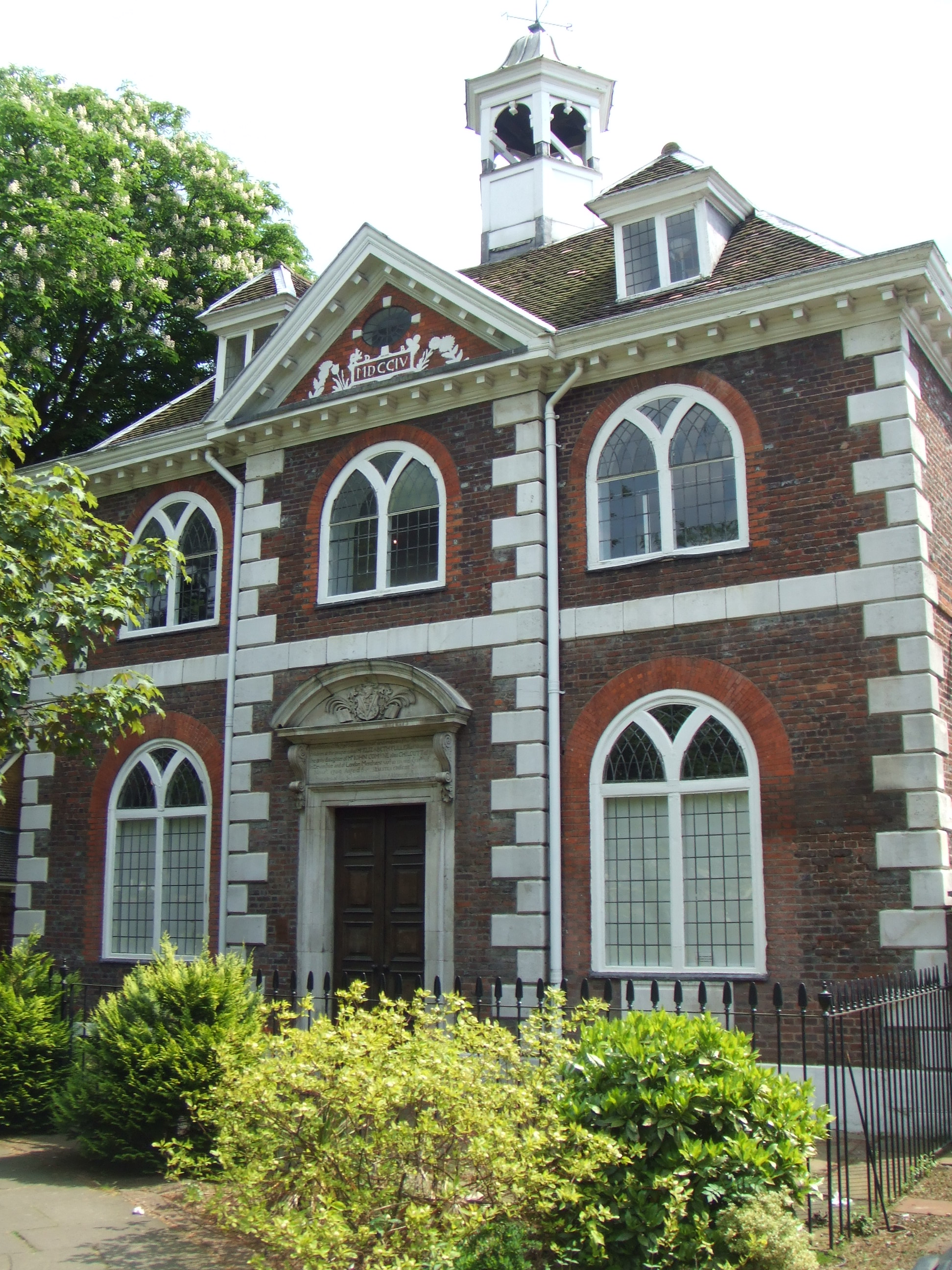
Watford Free School

In 1704, Mrs Elizabeth Fuller of Watford Place built the Watford Free School for forty boys and twenty girls on her land next to the churchyard, with rooms for a Master and a Mistress. The school-house was a fine structure at the south-west corner of St Mary's churchyard, and can still be seen there. In 1708 Mrs Fuller endowed the school with a rent-charge of £52 a year. The boys were taught to read, write and cast accounts, and the girls to read English, to knit and to sew.

The £52 a year was augmented with bequests, producing a revenue of £178, but the rent-charges were fixed and lost their value through inflation. Despite the help of endowments and gifts, the original charity school was in a sad state by the 1870s, when an application to the Charity Commissioners to sell part of the endowment to pay for overdue repairs led to an enquiry into the school. In 1878, the Commission forbad the school from admitting any more pupils in its current state, and asked the trustees to choose between turning the school into a public elementary school or amalgamating with a sum of £13,333/6/8d from the Platt Foundation for Aldenham School to form a new middle class school. With some reluctance, the trustees chose the latter, and the free school closed on 10 August 1882. The thirteen boys and two girls still at Mrs Fuller's Free School were placed in local elementary schools.

In 1881, a scheme was presented to the Charity Commissioners, combining Mrs Fuller's foundation with a portion of the Platt foundation to form the Watford Endowed Schools, which would educate up to 200 boys and 100 girls from age 7 to 16. The fees would be £4 to £8, although there would also be a number of scholarships. The trustees of the Free School became governors of the new schools, as did three representatives of the Brewers' Company (trustees of the Platt Foundation) and the vicar of Watford. The schools' heraldry reflects the union of the two foundations:

- On the left is the coat of arms of John Chilcott (Elizabeth Fuller's father), which are inscribed over the door of the Free School.
- On the right is the coat of arms of Richard Platt, which may also be seen at Aldenham School.

The schools' motto dates from the same period, and was taken from Virgil's Aeneid IX, 158: "pugnam sperate parati" ("look forward to the battle, prepared").

=== New school ===
The new boys' school was opened by the Earl of Clarendon on 21 April 1884, and the girls' school the next day. They started with 69 boys and 46 girls, rising to 129 boys and 68 girls during the year.

In 1903, the schools' names were changed to the Watford Grammar School and the Watford Grammar School for Girls. By 1904, the schools had outgrown their buildings, with 312 boys and 148 girls.

With the help of Hertfordshire County Council, a new girls' school was built and opened in Lady's Close in 1907, and the boys spread into the building the girls had vacated. In return, the council demanded changes in the schools' denominational character, and in 1908 a revised scheme removed the requirement that masters and mistresses belong to the Church of England and allowed pupils to opt out of instruction in the teachings of the Church. The leaving age was also raised to 17, and the number of scholarships increased.

The building was still insufficient for the boys' school, and with assistance from the County Council the school purchased part of Cassiobury Park facing Rickmansworth Road to build a new school. On 23 February 1912, the boys assembled outside the Derby road buildings and walked to the new site, which was formally opened by the Earl of Clarendon on 20 March 1912. Sixth Form courses were introduced during the First World War. In 1924, Rugby union was introduced in the boys' school and took over from football as the main winter sport.

The schools had become increasingly reliant on the county council for building funds, and with the introduction of the Tripartite System in 1944, the schools fully entered the maintained sector as voluntary controlled grammar schools. From 1947 to 1974 Hertfordshire participated in the Fleming scheme.

The schools also phased out their preparatory or junior departments to become purely secondary schools.

=== Comprehensive school ===
With the scrapping of the Tripartite System, they became comprehensive in 1975, and continued to expand. They became grant-maintained schools in 1990, controlled by their own governing bodies, independent of the county council, and funded directly by the Department for Education, and in 1995 introduced partial selection. In 1999 the schools converted to voluntary aided status.

The two schools maintain matching admissions policies. The selective proportion of their intake has been reduced since 1995, and currently stands at 25% academic and 10% musical aptitude. Their catchment area for selective admission reaches out about 5 miles, including some northern parts of the London boroughs of Harrow and Hillingdon. The schools also give priority to siblings of current pupils. Prior to 2008, each of them also gave priority to siblings of pupils at the other school (Watford Grammar School for Girls).

In 2010 the school became one of the first schools rated 'outstanding' by Ofsted to become an academy, along with the girls school.

Every year there is a Founder's Day service to commemorate the charitable foundations and to celebrate Dame Elizabeth Fuller's commitment and dedication to the school. This service is carried out at St Mary's Church in Watford Town centre. In 2016 The Independent Newspaper Published a table listing Watford Grammar School for Boys as the 7th Best Comprehensive or Partially Selective in the United Kingdom.

== Overview ==
=== School site ===
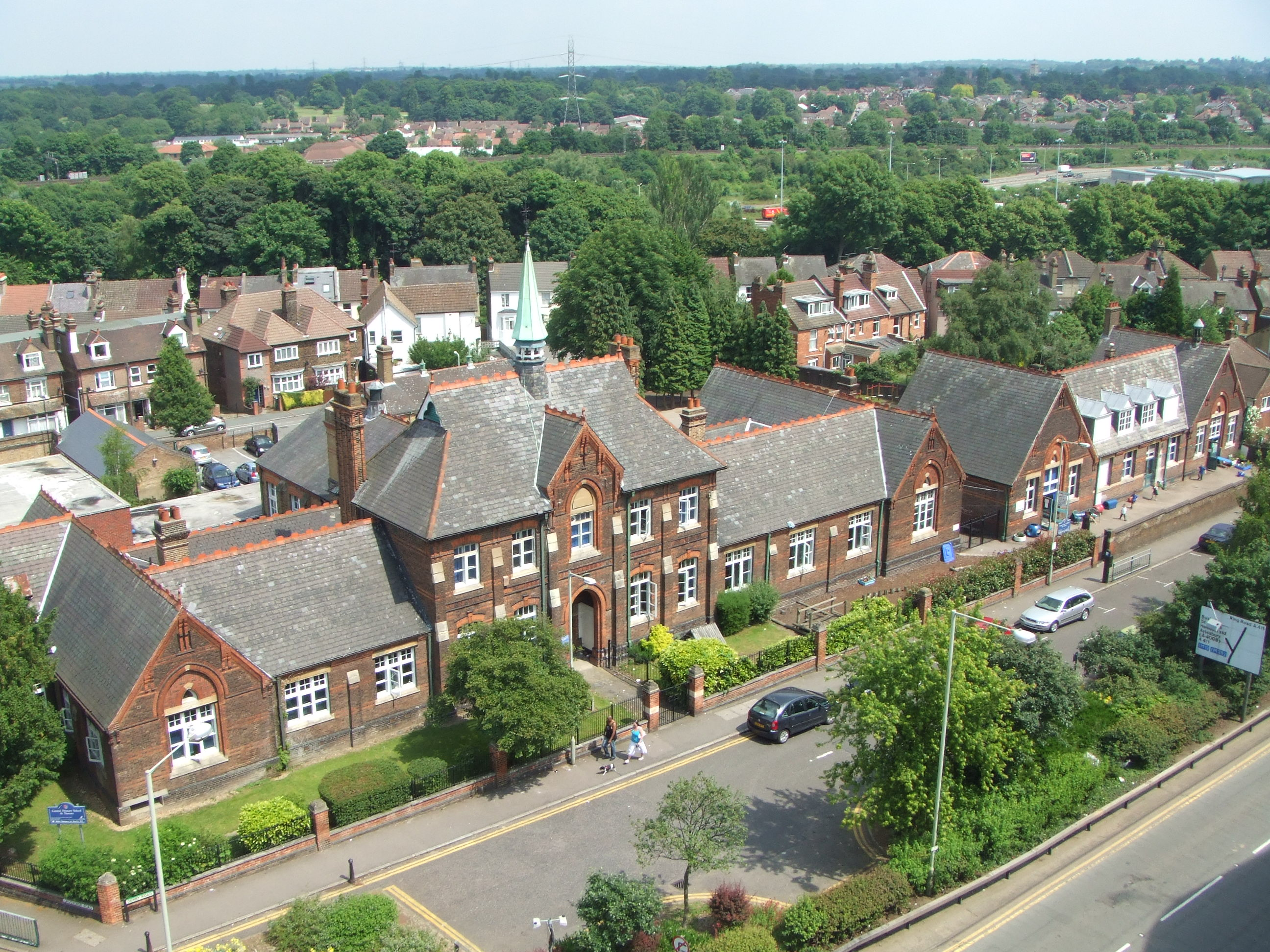
Watford Endowed Schools buildings (now the Central Primary School)

Sites were found in Derby Road for two new schools adjoining each other, one for boys and a smaller one for girls. (These buildings are now the Central Primary School.)

The school is located about 1 kilometre (0.6 mi) west of Watford town centre, just to the south of Watford tube station and Cassiobury Park. The 120-metre (390 ft) long neo-Georgian main block and the adjacent Master's House are Grade II listed buildings. The school was used as a location for many of the external and internal shots in the filming of The History Boys.

In recent years the school has built a gym, a music block (also partly owned by Hertfordshire School of Music) and a Sixth Form centre with a food technology lab, financed through fundraising and the sale of land on the northern edge of the grounds for residential development. The school's music block, the "Clarendon Muse", stands on the front lawn of the school. The building was completed in December 2007 at the cost of £5 million, and has approximately 2,000 square metres (22,000 sq ft) of space spread out over four floors. It is also used by the Hertfordshire School of Music in the evenings and weekends.

The school's new STEM Centre for the teaching of science, technology, engineering and maths was completed in November 2017 and opened by Lord Winston, before dismantled by the students, equipment was sourced from the technology block. Funding was providing by national and local government and parental donations supported the fittings and fixtures of the building.

Many sports are played at the New Field (shared with the Old Boys sports clubs) beside the Grand Union Canal near Cassiobury Park.

=== Notable old Fullerians ===
Old Boys of the School are known as "Old Fullerians". In chronological order:

- Captain Alan Rice-Oxley DFC (1898–1961), RAF officer, World War One fighter ace
- Gerald Moore (1899–1987), piano accompanist
- Group Captain Leslie Bonnet (1902–1985), RAF officer, writer and originator of the Welsh Harlequin Duck
- Edgar Anstey (1907–1987), documentary film pioneer
- Douglas Noel Sargent (1907–1979), 3rd Bishop of Selsby
- Eric Robinson (1908–1974), BBC television music presenter-conductor
- Arthur Geoffrey Walker, FRS, FRSE (1909–2001), mathematician
- Air Vice-Marshal Robert Bateson DSO and Bar, DFC (1912–1986), RAF officer who led the raid on the Gestapo headquarters in The Hague
- Lieutenant-Colonel Terence Otway DSO (1914–2006), Commanding Officer of 9th Bn. Parachute Regiment, assaulted the Merville Battery on D-Day
- Peter Laslett (1915–2001), historian
- William Hurst Rees (1917–2004), leading valuation surveyor
- John David Wilson (1919–2013), artist
- Air Vice-Marshal Colin Coulthard AFC and Bar (1921–2004), senior RAF officer and Air Attaché to Washington
- Reverend Canon Arthur Peacocke (1924–2006), theologian and evolutionist
- Richard Hughes (1926–2020), cricketer
- Terry Scott (1927–1994), actor and comedian
- Uwe Kitzinger, CBE (1928-2023), political analyst; Fellow, Nuffield College, Oxford (1956–1976); Foundation President, Templeton College, Oxford (1984—1991)
- Don Anthony, Represented Great Britain in the 1956 Summer Olympics in the Hammer Throw. Dedicated his life to the Olympic movement.
- John Clark (1932– ), actor and director
- A.D. (Tony) Nuttall (1937–2007), professor of English at Sussex and Oxford
- David Crighton, FRS (1942–2000), professor of applied mathematics, Master of Jesus College, Cambridge
- John Grillo (* 1942), theatre, film and television actor and playwright
- John Orr (1943–2010), Professor Emeritus, School of Social and Political Studies, Edinburgh University
- Sir Ian Prosser (1943– ), chairman of Bass plc, later Six Continents
- Sir Andrew Davis (1944–2024), orchestral conductor
- Rt Revd John Hind (* 1945), Bishop of Chichester, 2001–2012
- Knox (* 1945), musician
- Michael Rosen (* 1946), poet, writer and radio presenter, Children's Laureate
- John Taylor (1946– ), Wales and British Lions rugby player
- John K. Truss (* 1947), Professor of Pure Mathematics, University of Leeds
- Peter Taylor-Gooby, OBE, FBA (1948– ), Professor of Social Policy, University of Kent; Chair, British Academy New Paradigms in Public Policy Programme (2009–2011)
- David Sullivan (1949– ), pornographer and former football club chairman, joined the sixth form in the 1960s.
- Oliver Knussen (1952–2018), composer and conductor
- Adrian Leaper (* 1953), orchestral conductor
- Michael Thompson (1954– ), principal horn, Philharmonia Orchestra, horn soloist, professor, Royal Academy of Music
- Nick Bunker (* 1958), author and historian.
- Michael Purton, horn soloist and principal horn (1973–86), Hallé Orchestra, record producer
- Charles C. Taylor (* 1959), Professor of Statistics, University of Leeds
- Liam Gillick (* 1964) Artist
- Simon Munnery (* 1967), comedian and comedy writer
- Steve Easterbrook (* 1967), CEO of McDonald's (2015-2019)
- Grant Shapps (1968– ), former Home, Business, Energy, Transport and Defence Secretary
- Lee "Muddy" Baker (* 1969), musician
- Martin Rossiter (1970– ), ex lead singer of 90s Brit Pop band Gene
- Dan Neidle (* 1972), tax lawyer and campaigner
- David Pyatt (* 1974), horn soloist, BBC Young Musician of the Year, 1988
- Josh Lewsey (* 1976), England rugby player
- Duncan Hames (* 1977), Liberal Democrats MP for Chippenham (2010–2015)
- Tim Thorpe (* 1983), Principal Horn at BBC National Orchestra of Wales
- Alessandro Venturella (* 1984) musician and bassist in Slipknot_(band)
- James Smith (1985–), musician and lead singer of Hadouken!
- Donald Barrell (* 1986), Saracens and England sevens star
- Matthew Buckley (* 1987), actor
- Chris Stark (* 1987), British radio personality
- Alex Lozowski (* 1993), Rugby union player for Saracens

=== Notable teachers ===
- Sir Stanley Rous (football referee and FIFA president) was an assistant master (sports) 1921–1934.
- Harry Rée (educationist and wartime member of the Special Operations Executive) was headmaster 1951–1962.

=== Headmasters ===
(since the founding of the Watford Endowed School in 1884)

- 1884–1914 William Robert Carter
- 1914–1922 Harold Nicholson
- 1922–1938 Edward Reynolds
- 1938–1951 Percy Bolton
- 1951–1962 Harry Rée
- 1963–1991 Keith Turner OBE
- 1991–1993 Robert Evans
- 1993–1994 Neil Hart
- 1994–2000 Professor Sir John Holman
- 2000–2014 Martin Post
- 2014–2015 Mark Allchorn (acting)
- 2015–Present Ian Cooksey

== Old Fullerians' Association ==
The Old Boys Association, formed in 1894, is known as the "Old Fullerians' Association". All former pupils and past and present teachers and governors of the school are eligible for membership.

There are a number of associated clubs and societies:

- Association Football Club
- Cricket Club, formed in 1947
- Golfing Society
- Rugby Football Club
