= Richard Platt (brewer) =

English brewer

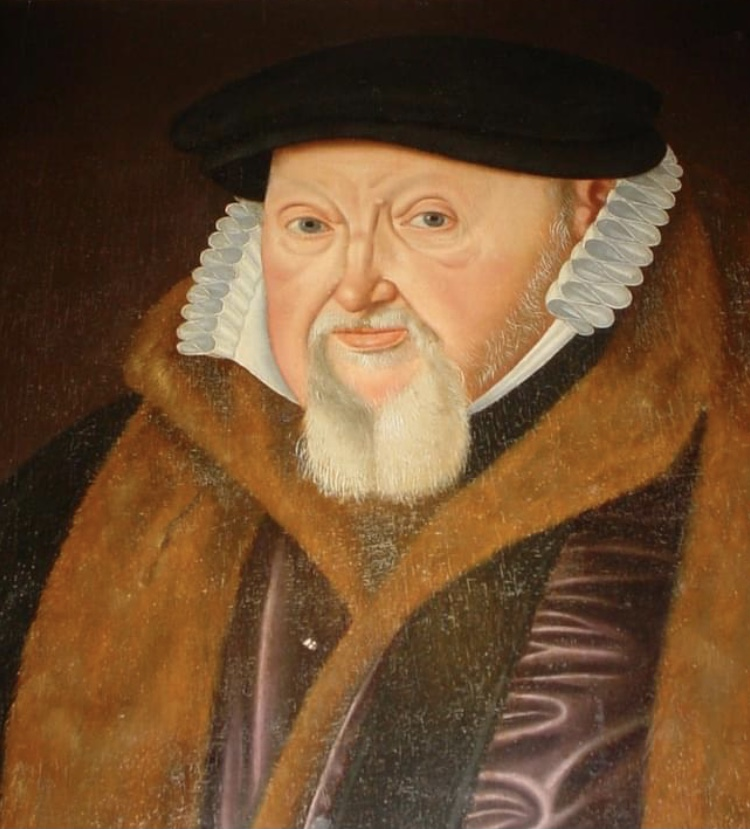
Platt in 1600

Richard Platt (1524 – 28 November 1600) was an English brewer of the City of London, who served as Sheriff of London and founded Aldenham School and almshouses in his home village in Hertfordshire.

== Life ==
Little is known of Platt's early life, except that he was the son of Hugh Platt, of Aldenham, and was apprenticed to a London brewer. His date of birth can be inferred from his portrait, which says he was in his 76th year in 1600. He became a master brewer of the Worshipful Company of Brewers and the owner of the Old Swan brewery in James Street, London. In 1576 and 1581 he served as Master of the Worshipful Company of Brewers. He also became an Alderman of London.

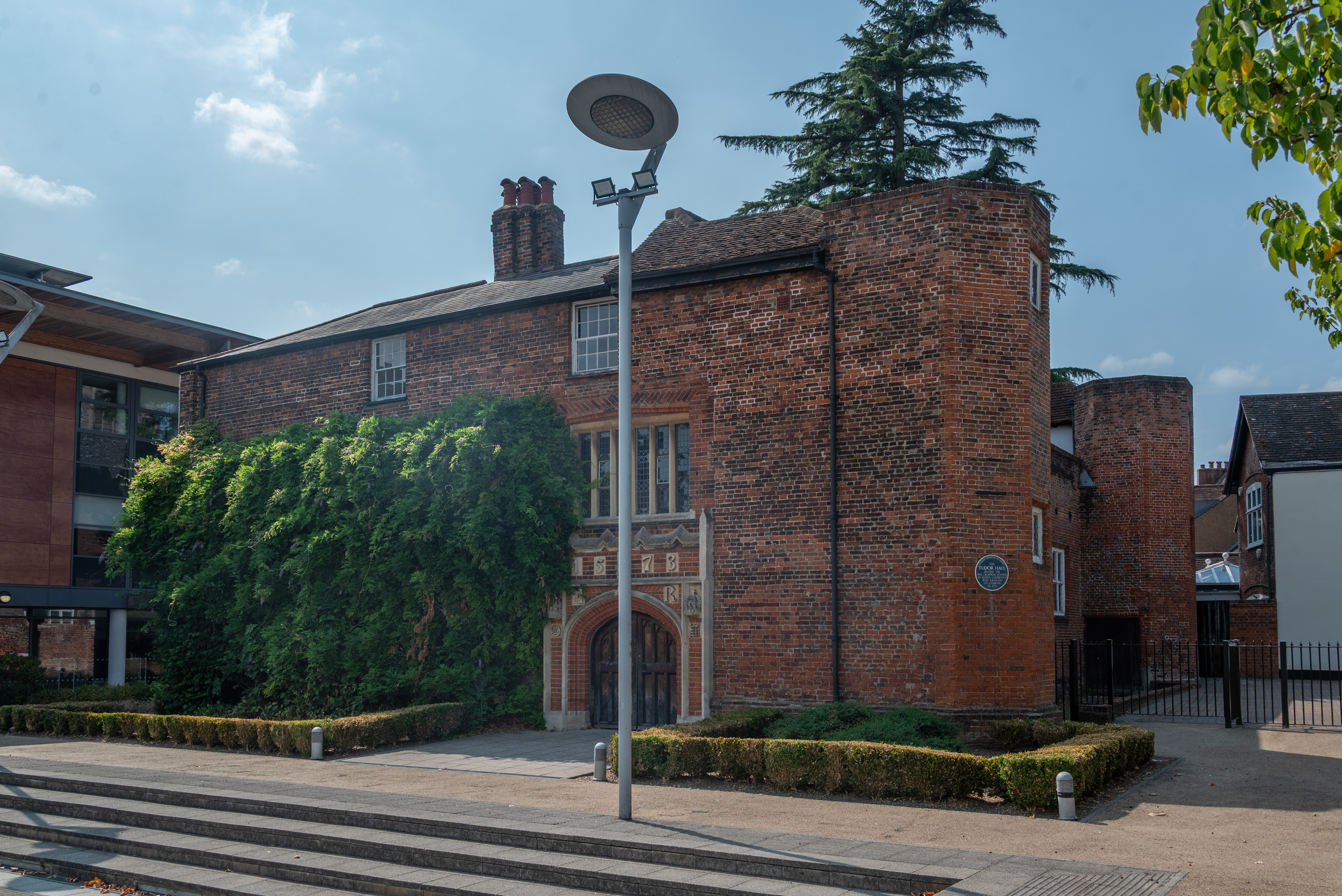
Tudor Hall, little changed since the time of Platt

In 1591, Platt was appointed as a governor of Queen Elizabeth's School, Barnet, at Tudor Hall, and was then a citizen of London who had served as Sheriff of London.

In 1596, Queen Elizabeth I gave Platt letters patent to build at Aldenham a "Free Grammar School and Almshouses", and a foundation stone was laid in 1597, at Boyden's Hill, Aldenham. By a deed dated 18 January 1599, Platt endowed two charities, the grammar school and six almshouses, with land at Aldenham and some twenty acres of pasture at St Pancras, and woodland there, placing the endowments in the care of the Worshipful Company of Brewers.

Platt's son Hugh Platt had been educated at St John's College, Cambridge, and Platt gave instructions that when there was a vacancy for a Master of the grammar school, the college was to nominate three Masters of Arts, from whom the Brewers' Company would appoint one. He also provided a house, with a garden and orchard, and a salary to go with the position of £20 a year, equivalent to £5,275 in 2025.

Platt died on 28 November 1600 and was buried on 4 December at St James Garlickhythe, London.

In his will, Platt provided for the Brewers' Company to pay the boys of his new grammar school beer money, as the water was not safe to drink. Pupils at Aldenham School continue to visit Brewers' Hall once a year to receive £5 each.

== Wife and descendants ==
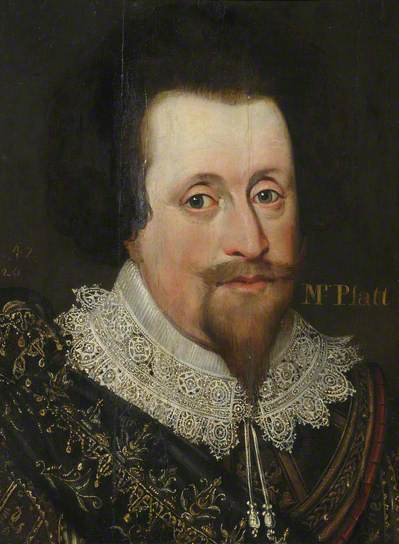
Hugh Platt

Platt married Alice, a daughter of John Birchells, of Birchells, Leicestershire. His children included Sir Hugh Platt, an author of Kirby Castle, Bethnal Green, whose son William Platt (died 1637) of Highgate, was the founder of fellowships at St John's College, Cambridge.

== Arms ==
Arms of Platt, now used by Aldenham School

Platt's coat of arms was blazoned "or fretty sable plattée", with a crest of "a demi-lion rampant proper holding in the paws a plate".
