= John Blake (cricketer) =

English cricketer and Royal Marines officer

Personal information
- Full name: John Philip Blake
- Born: 17 November 1917; Portsmouth, Hampshire, England
- Died: 3 June 1944 (aged 26); Nerežišća, Brač, German-occupied Yugoslavia
- Batting: Right-handed
- Relatives: David Blake (brother)

Domestic team information
- Years: Team
- 1937–1939: Hampshire
- 1938–1939: Cambridge University

Career statistics
Competition	First-class
Matches	21
Runs scored	1,095
Batting average	22.81
100s/50s	–/7
Top score	88
Catches/stumpings	18/–
- Source: Cricinfo, 10 January 2010

John Philip Blake MC (17 November 1917 — 3 June 1944) was an English first-class cricketer and Royal Marines officer. Blake played first-class cricket in the late 1930s for both Cambridge University and Hampshire. He later served in the Royal Marines during the Second World War, being posthumously decorated with the Military Cross.

== Early life and first-class cricket ==
The son of Philip and Marjorie Flora Blake, he was born at Portsmouth in November 1917. His father was a dentist in the nearby town of Havant. He had a younger brother, David, who would also play first-class cricket. At the age of 7, John was seriously injured on 13 April 1925 when he was hit by a car whilst crossing a road in Harpenden, where he was staying in town with a relative. Blake was educated at Emsworth House School, before proceeding to Aldenham School as a scholar, where he played for the school cricket team and headed its averages in 1935. From there, he matriculated to study mathematics at St John's College, Cambridge.

While studying at Cambridge, he made his debut in first-class cricket for Hampshire against Sussex at Worthing in the 1938 County Championship. A member of Cambridge University Cricket Club, Blake made a single first-class appearance for Cambridge the following season against the British Army cricket team, in addition to playing for Hampshire against Cambridge University. In 1939, which was his final year at Cambridge, he played extensively for Cambridge, making fourteen appearances; this included playing in that seasons University Match against Oxford University at Lord's, which gained him his Blue. Later in the summer of 1939, he made seven first-class appearances for Hampshire. In total, he played fifteen first-class matches for Cambridge and fourteen for Hampshire. For Cambridge, he scored 767 runs at an average of 31.95, with seven half centuries and a highest score of 88. For Hampshire, he scored 328 runs at an average of 13.66, with a highest score of 48. After graduating from Cambridge, Blake became a maths teacher at Sherborne School and a tutor at Westcott House, Cambridge.

== Second World War service ==
The Second World War began on 1 September 1939, with Blake being commissioned in the Royal Marines in December 1939 as a temporary second lieutenant, before being appointed a temporary lieutenant in March 1940. He took part in the failed Operation Menace in September 1940. In October 1941, he was appointed a temporary captain. In 1943, Blake joined the newly formed 43 Commando. He took part in the Anzio landings in January 1944, alongside No. 9 Commando. There, they were tasked with capturing three mountains to extend the allied bridgehead over The Garigliano. Following a nighttime battle, fought under heavy machine gun and mortar fire, they captured Monte Ornito. For his personal courage and leadership during this engagement, he was awarded the Military Cross.

However, his Military Cross would be awarded posthumously. In June 1944, 43 Commando were withdrawn to the Adriatic Sea, where they attacked a German stronghold on the island of Brač in German-occupied Yugoslavia. Lacking the appropriate support for the operation, Blake was killed during a German counter-attack, having successfully led his men through a minefield. Blake was buried at the Belgrade War Cemetery.
