= The Spires College =

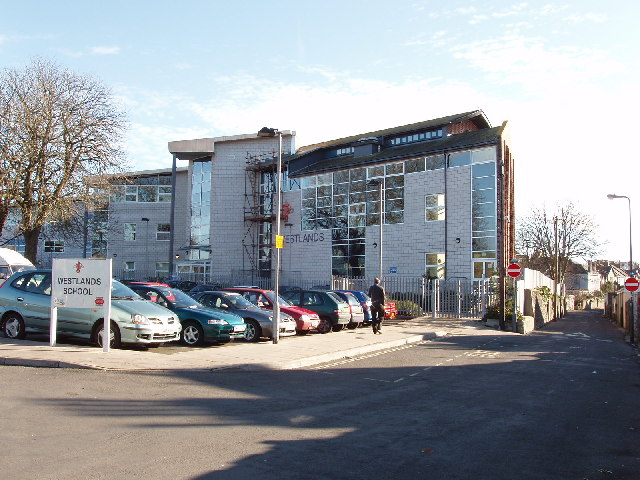

Location
- Westlands Lane; Torquay, Devon, TQ1 3PE; England; 50°28′32″N 3°31′25″W

Information
- Type: Foundation bilateral school
- Local authority: Torbay
- Department for Education URN: 113526 Tables
- Ofsted: Reports
- Principal: Alex Newton
- Gender: Mixed
- Age: 11 to 18
- Website: thespirescollege.com

The Spires College is a mixed secondary school and sixth form located in the Devon town of Torquay, England. It is a bilateral school, with places for children who reach the required standard in the 11+ test and for those who do not take the test or do not reach the required standard. There is also specialist unit for students with hearing Impairment. The school is located in the Plainmoor district of Torquay.

== History ==
In 1973 Westhill Secondary School and Homelands Technical High School, the latter being an all-boys school, joined to form Westlands School. It was split over two separate sites about half a mile from each other. The site on Westhill Road was known as the Lower School, whilst the other site, shared with Homelands Primary School in Westlands Lane, was known as the Upper School.

The buildings on Westhill Road were originally built to be an army hospital during the Second World War and each classroom had walls made of multiple double doors where beds would have been brought in and out.

Throughout the 1970s, the school became increasingly run down with little or no investment in buildings. In 1978, a major fire, which broke out in the upper school's chemistry department storeroom, exacerbated the situation by seriously damaging many classrooms. Both sites relied heavily on outside cabins to provide extra teaching facilities which, by the late 1990s, were old and became increasingly unfit for purpose.

In 1999, Homelands Primary School relocated to the Westhill Road site to allow work to commence on the Upper School Site for a brand new school building. This was financed through the government's Private Finance Initiative (PFI) scheme, whereby Torbay Council owns the land whilst a private company built and owns the building, and manages the on site facilities, for a period of twenty-five years. The new school was built in sections, allowing the school to remain open during the works. The new building was opened to house the whole school in September 2001.

Work then commenced on the Westhill Road site for a new building for Homelands Primary School. This was completed in Summer 2002.

In September 2015 Westlands School became The Spires College.
