= Colin Coulthard =

UK World War 2 fighter pilot

Colin Weall Coulthard CB AFC and Bar
- Born: 27 February 1921; Bournemouth, Dorset, United Kingdom
- Died: 15 November 2004 (aged 83) Cornwall
- Allegiance: United Kingdom
- Branch: Royal Air Force
- Service years: 1939–1976
- Rank: Air Vice-Marshal
- Commands: No. 266 Squadron RAF; RAF Gütersloh
- Conflicts: Second World War
- Awards: Companion of the Order of the Bath; Air Force Cross and Bar; Mentioned in Despatches

Air Vice-Marshal Colin Weall Coulthard, CB, AFC and Bar (27 February 1921 – 15 November 2004) was an officer in the Royal Air Force. He served as a fighter pilot and instructor during World War II, and held several command assignments in Europe between 1945 and 1976.

== Early life ==
Coulthard was educated at Watford Grammar School for Boys, and later studied aeronautical engineering at the de Havilland Aeronautical Technical School in Hatfield. On the outbreak of war he joined the RAF and trained to fly the Supermarine Spitfire.

== Military career ==
After undergoing pilot training in Rhodesia, Coulthard deployed to Malta in 1943 and took part in the Invasion of Italy and Operation Dragoon, the Allied invasion of the south of France. He was mentioned in dispatches. Towards the end of the war Coulthard was selected to be part of the initial group of pilots that would transition to Britain's first operational jet fighter, the Gloster Meteor. After the war he was attached to the Central Fighter Establishment and stationed in RAF Wunstorf in Germany, where he took part in the evaluation trials for the de Havilland Venom. In 1955 he became chief instructor at RAF Pembrey. In 1961 he assumed command of RAF Gütersloh. Units under his command were involved in operations related to the Berlin Airlift in 1962.

In 1967 Coulthard was promoted to Air Commodore and transferred to the Ministry Of Defence as Director of Operational Requirements. In 1970 he was appointed Air Attaché to Washington. His final promotion to Air Vice-Marshal was as head of the Defence Export Services Organisation, prior to his retirement in 1976.

== Later life ==
After retirement, Coulthard settled in Cornwall where he became governor of Truro School. He was awarded CB in 1975, and became an Honorary Fellow of the Royal Aeronautical Society the same year. He died in 2004, aged 83.

== Bibliography ==
- Martell, Paul; Hayes, Grace P.; Dupuy, Trevor Nevitt (1974). World defence who's who. London: Macdonald and Jane's. ISBN 9780356080031.
- Thomas, Andrew (2011). Spitfire Aces of North Africa and Italy. Vol. 93 of Aircraft of the Aces. Osprey Publishing. ISBN 9781849083430.
- Diplomatic List. Department and Foreign Service series. United States Department of State (2 ed.). Washington, DC: U.S. Government Printing Office.
- "Flypast Magazine". Flypast (282–286). Key Publishing Ltd. 2005. ISSN 0262-6950.
- Kelly's Handbook to the Titled, Landed and Official Classes. Kelly's Directories. 1969.
- Watkins, David (2003). Venom: de Havilland Venom and Sea Venom: the complete history. Sutton. ISBN 9780750931618.
