= John Debenham Taylor =

British intelligence officer

- Born: 25 April 1920; Wallington, Surrey (now London), England
- Died: 30 January 2016
- Education: Aldenham School
- Occupation: Intelligence officer
- Spouse: Gillian May James (m.1966)
- Children: 1

John Debenham Taylor CMG OBE (25 April 1920 – 30 January 2016), was a British intelligence officer.

Taylor was born on 25 April 1920 in Wallington, Surrey (now London), and educated at Aldenham School.

In February 1939, he joined the Territorial Army, and at the start of the war in September, was commissioned as a second lieutenant in the Royal Artillery. In 1942, he moved into intelligence work, and became an instructor to Beaulieu, in the New Forest, the Special Operations Executive (SOE) "finishing school" for agents.

In 1944, Taylor was promoted to major, and posted to Ceylon, and then Indonesia. When SOE was dissolved in January 1946, he joined the Secret Intelligence Service (SIS) and worked there for the next 30 years, but his official status was that of a diplomat.

He was appointed OBE in 1959, and CMG in 1967.

In 1966, Taylor married Gillian May James, a BBC make-up artist, having met her in 1965, and they had a daughter Cate Debenham-Taylor, an actress.
