= Federal Procession of 1788 =

The Federal Processions of 1788 (also called the "Grand Federal Processions") were large municipal celebrations of the ratification of the United States Constitution that took place in Philadelphia and New York City, though other types of celebrations took place throughout the states. New Hampshire was the ninth state to ratify the Constitution, on 21 June 1788, thus completing sufficient ratification for the Constitution's consummation. Celebrations climaxed with the Federal Processions of July 1788.

Historian Whitfield J. Bell, Jr., noted that, prior to the Federal Processions in July, many of the celebrations to mark each states' ratification were "official, small, almost sedate; the citizens witnessed them but did not participate."

== New York's Federal Procession ==
New York's Federal Procession was organized by Richard Platt, the Chairman of the Committee of Arrangements. News of New Hampshire's ratification was sent to Poughkeepsie, seat of New York's ratification convention, and reached New York City on 25 June 1788. Some historians have noted that Federalists, ardent supporters of the Constitution, may have been eager to celebrate ratification in hopes that public "enthusiasm shown on the day of the parade would influence the antis at Poughkeepsie," referring to the Anti-Federalists. Platt cited the remarkable enthusiasm of the citizenry as a reason why the parade could no longer be delayed until New York's ratification: "The day having been more than once postponed in the interesting hope that this state, then in its convention, would likewise accede to the Union, the Committee of Arrangements found it impossible any longer to oppose this patriotic ardor of their fellow citizens." The procession was originally planned for 10 July, but then was delayed until 22 July. It was delayed again until 23 July, "in order to give the Jews an opportunity to join the festivals, the 22nd being one of their holidays." By the time of New York's parade, which was delayed until 23 July 1788, Virginia had also ratified, bringing the total number of states to ten; New York's parade was thus divided into ten divisions to honor those states.

On July 22, the day before the march, Platt put an advertisement in the New-York Packet asking for citizens to clean the streets in preparation: "The inhabitants of Broad-way, White Hall-street, Great Dock-street, are requested to sweep and water the respective streets on Tuesday evening and Wednesday morning, for the accommodation of the Federal Procession."

It is evident from Platt's comprehensive account of the procession that there were sentiments of disappointment regarding the states which had not yet ratified the Constitution. In the Eighth Division, for example, there was "The old Constitution, represented by the naked body of a man, denoting Congress without power, with 13 heads, looking different ways; shewing [sic] the clashing interests of the States in Union [...] The ten men well dressed, representing the ten states, supporting the head of a man, representing the New Constitution united in a Federal Head." Presumably, the "old Constitution" refers to the Articles of Confederation.

=== Day of the Procession ===
In his published account of the procession, Platt noted that the parade began at around 10:00am at the sound of 13 guns, fired from the federal ship Hamilton. The parade was marshalled into ten divisions, to honor the ten states who had at that point ratified the constitution, and each division was preceded by a white flag. The divisions were as follows, as described in Platt's account:

1. First Division: "Foresters with axes;" a man dressed as Christopher Columbus "in ancient dress" astride a horse; farmers; "a new invented threshing machine"; a band; tailors; bakers; and brewers.
2. Second Division: Coopers and butchers.
3. Third Division: Cordwainers.
4. Fourth Division: Carpenters; furriers; hatters; hair dressers; and artificial florists.
5. Fifth Division: White smiths; cutlers; confectioners (who carried a "Bacchus's cup made of sugar" with an inscription of 'the Federal Confectioner' "round the goblet's edge"); stone masons; brick layers; painters; cabinet makers and chair makers; drum makers; upholsterers; and civil engineers.
6. Sixth Division: Black smiths; "Ship Joiners" and "Boat Builders"; sail makers; and riggers.
7. Seventh Division: The Federal Ship Hamilton: "A frigate of thirty-two guns, twenty-seven feet keel, and ten feet beam, with galleries and everything complete and in proportion, both in hull and rigging; manned with upwards of thirty seamen and marines, in their different uniforms; Commanded by Commodore Nicholson, and drawn by ten horses."
8. Eighth Division: Cart men; "Horse doctors"; "Mathematical Instrument makers"; carvers and engravers; copper, gold, and silver smiths; potters and pewters.
9. Ninth Division: Lawyers; the Philological Society; merchants and traders.
10. Tenth Division: Physicians and various others.

Platt noted that the procession contained nearly 5,000 people and stretched to over a mile and a half. Even with this number of people, and with crowds lining the streets, Platt noted this:

As this splendid, novel and interesting exhibition moved along, an unexpected silence reigned throughout the city, which gave a solemnity to the whole transaction suited to the singular importance of its cause. No noise was heard but the deep rumbling of carriage wheels, with the necessary salutes and signals. A glad serenity enlivened every countenance, while the joyous expectation of national prosperity triumphed in every bosom.

Following the procession, a banquet was held, once again divided into 10 long tables to represent the ratifying states. Thirteen toasts were made at the banquet, as quoted from Platt:

Dinner being ended, the following toasts were drank--

1. The United States.
2. The States which have ratified the New Constitution.
3. The Convention of the State of New-York; may they soon add an eleventh pillar to the Federal Edifice.
4. General Washington.
5. His Most Christian Majesty.
6. His Catholic Majesty.
7. The States General of the United Netherlands.
8. The friendly powers in Europe.
9. The patriotic framers of the present national Constitution.
10. The memory of those heroes who have fallen in defence [sic] of American Liberty.
11. Success of agriculture, manufactures and the sciences.
12. May trade and navigation flourish.
13. The Day; May the Union of States be perpetual.
