= David Blake (English cricketer) =

English cricketer & dentist (1925–2015)

Personal information
- Full name: David Eustace Blake
- Born: 27 April 1925; Havant, Hampshire, England
- Died: 21 May 2015 (aged 90); Portchester, Hampshire, England
- Batting: Left-handed
- Role: Wicket-keeper
- Relatives: John Blake (brother)

Domestic team information
- Years: Team
- 1949–1958: Hampshire
- 1952–1961: Marylebone Cricket Club

Career statistics
Competition	First-class
Matches	73
Runs scored	2,909
Batting average	24.24
100s/50s	2/20
Top score	100
Catches/stumpings	91/30
- Source: Cricinfo, 10 January 2010

David Eustace Blake (27 April 1925 — 21 May 2015) was an English amateur first-class cricketer who appeared in 73 matches, scoring nearly 3,000 runs and taking 91 catches and making 30 stumpings as a wicket-keeper. His first-class career saw him score two centuries. Outside of cricket, Blake was a dentist, with his profession often limiting his availability to play first-class cricket.

== Early life ==
The son of Philip and Marjorie Flora Blake, he was born at Havant in April 1925. His father was a dentist in the town. He had an elder brother, John, who also played first-class cricket. He was educated at Aldenham School, where he played in the school cricket team alongside future England Test cricketer John Dewes. before attending and Guy's Hospital Dental School. After graduating, he had a dental practice in Portsmouth, with him only playing cricket when the demands of the practice allowed him time to do so. He served in the latter stages of the Second World War, being commissioned into the Royal Engineers as a second lieutenant in April 1945; his brother had been killed in action the previous year. In 1956, he transferred to the Royal Army Dental Corps as a lieutenant.

== First-class cricket ==
Blake made his debut in first-class cricket for Hampshire against the Combined Services cricket team at Portsmouth in 1949; his debut was a success, stumping Peter May and making scores of 47 and 54. His County Championship debut came in the same season against Middlesex at Bournemouth. Blake featured regularly for Hampshire in the County Championship in the proceeding seasons. In 1952, he made his debut for the Marylebone Cricket Club (MCC) against Ireland at Dublin, while the following season he played for the Free Foresters against Cambridge University at Fenner's. By 1954, Blake's appearances for Hampshire were becoming less frequent, however he did record his maiden first-class century against Somerset in 1954, with a score of exactly 100. He played first-class cricket for Hampshire until 1958, making fifty first-class appearances for the county. Although he was a wicket-keeper, he was rarely Hampshire's first choice wicket-keeper, with Leo Harrison being preferred. Blake scored 1,811 runs for Hampshire at an average of 21.81, with twelve half centuries complimenting his one century. In the field, he took 91 catches — not all as a wicket-keeper — and made 30 stumpings.

His second first-class century, incidentally also a score of exactly 100, came for the Free Foresters against Oxford University at Oxford in 1959. For the MCC, Blake made a further nine first-class appearances for the club following his 1952 debut; four of these came against Ireland in 1954, 1958, 1958 and 1960. In ten first-class matches for the MCC, he scored 491 runs at an average of 23.27, making three half centuries and with a highest score of 76. In the field, he took 15 catches — again, not all as a wicket-keeper — and made 10 stumpings. Besides playing for Hampshire, the MCC, and the Free Foresters in England, he also played for the Gentlemen of England against the touring Australians at Lord's in 1956. Blake twice toured aboard to play first-class cricket in the West Indies. His first tour came with E. W. Swanton's XI in March and April 1956, with him making four first-class appearances on the tour, playing against Barbados, Trinidad and a West Indies XI. His second tour came the following year for the Duke of Norfolk's XI, with him making a single first-class appearance on the tour against Jamaica at Kingston. Blake died in May 2015 at Portchester, Hampshire.
