= Poole High School =

Secondary School in Poole, Dorset, England

Location
- Wimborne Rd; Poole, Dorset, BH15 2BW; England; 50°43′28″N 1°59′02″W

Information
- Type: Foundation school
- Established: 1939
- Founder: Earl of Shaftesbury
- Local authority: Bournemouth, Christchurch and Poole
- Department for Education URN: 113907 Tables
- Ofsted: Reports
- Headteacher: Sian Phillips
- Gender: Co-educational
- Age: 11 to 18
- Enrolment: 1,875
- Houses: Green, Brownsea, Furzey, Long (Former Garland, Thompson, Lester, Jollife, Masters, Spurrier)
- Website: http://www.poolehigh.co.uk/

Poole High School is a co-educational secondary school and sixth form located in the centre of Poole, in the English county of Dorset.

== History ==
Built in 1939 as Henry Harbin Senior School, the school has expanded in every decade since its opening. The school was originally two separate schools - girls on the eastern side, boys on the west, separated by a quadrangle in the centre of the main school building. This layout was almost exactly the same as the original building at Kemp-Welch School, which opened in 1938. The school became a mixed school for 12- to 16-year-olds in the 1970s, reverting to an entry age of 11 in September 2013, as part of Poole's re-organisation into a two-tier education system.

In the late 1980s the school became a 'technical high school', and its name was officially changed to Poole Technical High School in the early 1990s. It was during this period that the school added a sixth form and introduced an academic express stream, with a particular focus on the teaching of 'triple science' qualifications. It is one of a small group of partially selective schools that were permitted to retain selection under the provisions of the School Standards and Framework Act 1998.

Redevelopments have included the new main school canteen, an English block, extensions to the Art and Science blocks, and the Merchants' Hall, which includes a canteen for the sixth-form and seminar rooms.

At its 2011 OFSTED inspection, the school was graded as 'good'.

From September 2013, the school has admitted students in Year 7, taking the total number of students in attendance at PHS to over 1900, making it one of the larger schools in the country.

Work completed over summer 2014 focused on extending the life of the newly named "Shaftesbury Centre". The name of the building was chosen to honour the 9th Earl of Shaftesbury, who opened the school in 1939.

Before 2017 the school operated a house system, in every house, there were two registration groups per year. The houses were called Jolliffe, Garland, Lester, Masters, Thompson, Spurrier and Harbin. In 2017, Spurrier and Harbin, were abolished and Year Eleven pupils were placed in a separate year eleven group. However all elements of the house system were suspended from 2017 apart from for Sports Day activities, and the house system was replaced with a year group system. In 2023, houses were brought back for the upcoming Sports Day, creating the houses of Green, Furzey, Brownsea, and Long, each named after a retrospective island within the local area.

In September 2019, Poole High School officially turned on its PV system, 592 panels generating 185 kWh of electricity.

In November 2016, an OFSTED inspection the school was graded as 'good', which was an improvement from the June inspection that stated the school 'requires improvement'.

== Notable alumni ==
- Greg Lake, musician, singer, and songwriter, King Crimson, Emerson, Lake, & Palmer (ELP)
