= Richard Hughes (cricketer) =

English cricketer (1926–2020)

Cricket information
- Batting: Right-handed
- Bowling: Left-arm medium-fast

Career statistics
Competition	First-class
Matches	11
Runs scored	47
Batting average	5.87
100s/50s	0/0
Top score	21
Balls bowled	1,068
Wickets	15
Bowling average	46.26
5 wickets in innings	0
10 wickets in match	0
Best bowling	3/38
Catches/stumpings	2/–
- Source: Cricinfo, 8 November 2022

Richard Clive Hughes (30 September 1926 – 5 March 2020) was an English first-class cricketer who played 11 games for Worcestershire in the early 1950s.

Hughes was born in Watford, Hertfordshire in September 1926 and was educated at Watford Grammar School for Boys. He made his first-class debut for Worcestershire against the Combined Services at New Road in May 1950; in the second innings he took 3-38, which was to remain his career best innings return. His victims were Wilfred Payton, Anthony Thackara and Michael Ainsworth, the last-named being a capped Worcestershire player himself. Hughes played no other first-class cricket in 1950, although he did appear several times for the county's Second XI in the Minor Counties Championship.

The 1951 season saw Hughes play ten more games for Worcestershire, but with limited success: his 12 wickets cost him over 53 runs apiece, while in nine innings he scored a mere 43 runs, almost half of them courtesy of the career-best 21 he made against Surrey in June. His last game was at Scarborough against Yorkshire at the end of August, in which his only wicket was that of Edward Lester. Hughes later played club cricket for Harrow Town, as well as Minor Counties cricket for Hertfordshire, his native county, until he retired in 1960 due to injury. He died in March 2020 at the age of 93.
