= Partially selective school (England) =

Type of secondary school in England

In England, a partially selective school is one of a few dozen state-funded secondary schools that select a proportion of their intake by ability or aptitude, permitted as a continuation of arrangements that existed prior to 1997. Though treated together by current legislation, they are of two types: bilateral schools in remnants of the Tripartite System, and former grant-maintained schools that introduced partial selection in the 1990s. While technically classified as comprehensive schools, they occupy a middle ground between grammar schools and true comprehensives, and many of the arguments for and against grammar schools also apply to these schools. Although there are relatively few schools of this type, several of them score very highly in national performance tables, and are among the most over-subscribed schools in the country.

There are no partially selective schools in Scotland and Wales, which have wholly comprehensive systems, while Northern Ireland retains a grammar system.

== History ==
Partially selective schools are of two types:

- A bilateral school contains both grammar and non-selective streams, with the two groups of students taught separately. Bilateral schools were originally part of the Tripartite System in more sparsely populated areas unable to support separate schools. Most of those existing today were established in the 1970s in a few areas retaining the Tripartite System.
- Partial selection was introduced in some grant-maintained schools during the final years of the Conservative government led by John Major. Grant-maintained status was introduced by the Education Reform Act 1988, and gave such schools control over their own admissions. Circular 6/93 permitted these schools to select up to 10% of their intake on the basis of ability or aptitude in music, art, drama or sport. Circular 6/96 permitted more selection. By 1997, over 40 schools were selecting up to 50% of pupils.

In 1997 a Labour government was elected, with a policy of abolishing partial selection. David Blunkett, then Secretary of State for Education and Employment, said in December 1997:

I am able to confirm that the Bill and the criteria I will lay down as part of our admissions policy will remove partial selection where it currently exists. That causes havoc in terms of the admission of local children, and denies fairness to parents because of the lack of choices and opportunities open to them.

However, the School Standards and Framework Act 1998 permitted selection of up to 10% by aptitude for certain subjects for which a school is a specialist college (section 102), and also permitted the retention of partial selection that existed prior to the 1997 entry, provided that the proportion selected was no higher than that in 1997 (section 100). The 1998 Act also created schools adjudicators, empowered to rule on objections to school admission arrangements, including partial selection. This mechanism has steadily reduced both the number of schools using selection and the proportion of partial selection at the remaining schools.

These schools often also give preference to siblings of current pupils, filling the rest of their places using distance and/or faith criteria. The sibling criterion is particularly controversial, as in combination with selection it often severely limits the number of local children admitted. In response to these concerns, the initial draft of a revised schools admissions code proposed to ban sibling criteria in schools that selected more than 10% on their intake. After many protests, the admissions code as published in February 2007 protected siblings of current students, and permitted schools to give priority to siblings provided that "their admission arrangements as a whole do not exclude families living nearer the school." This phrasing was removed in the revised Code published in January 2009.

A late amendment to the Education and Inspections Act 2006 amended the 1998 Act to limit the proportion selected to the lowest level at any time since 1997. This forced four Hertfordshire schools to lower their proportion of academic selection from 35% to 25%.

== Partial selection today ==
The following bilateral schools continue to operate in surviving fully selective areas:

LEA	School	Gender	Coordinates
Lincolnshire	King Edward VI Academy	Mixed	53.177°N 0.092°E
Reading	Reading Girls' School	Girls	51.474°N 0.166°E
Southend-on-Sea	St Bernard's High School	Girls	51.538°N 0.699°E
Southend-on-Sea	St Thomas More High School	Boys	51.554°N 0.671°E
Torbay	The Spires College	Mixed	50.476°N 3.524°W
Warwickshire	Ashlawn School	Mixed	52.357°N 1.231°W

To be admitted to the selective stream, applicants must achieve the qualifying standard in an eleven plus exam, typically shared with local grammar schools. In practice, some of these schools do not fill their allocation of selective places due to competition from the neighbouring grammar schools. Unlike grammar schools, they are required to fill any remaining places with non-selective applicants.

The following schools retain partial selection introduced between 1993 and 1997:

LEA	School	Gender	Selective proportion of intake	Siblings	Coordinates
Barnet	Mill Hill County High School	Mixed	10% technology, 10% music, 5% dance	yes	51.630°N 0.249°W
Croydon	The Archbishop Lanfranc School	Mixed	15% general ability	yes	51.391°N 0.130°W
Croydon	Edenham High School	Mixed	15% general ability	yes	51.384°N 0.039°W
Croydon	Riddlesdown High School	Mixed	15% general ability	no	51.326°N 0.088°W
Croydon	Shirley High School	Mixed	15% general ability	yes	51.370°N 0.049°W
Dorset	Budmouth Technology College	Mixed	12% general ability	yes	50.611°N 2.491°W
Dudley	Old Swinford Hospital	Boys	27% general ability	yes	52.451°N 2.144°W
Essex	The King John School	Mixed	15% general ability	yes	51.556°N 0.593°E
Hertfordshire	Dame Alice Owen's School	Mixed	32.5% general ability, 5% music	yes	51.691°N 0.207°W
Hertfordshire	Parmiter's School	Mixed	25% general ability, 10% music	yes	51.703°N 0.389°W
Hertfordshire	Queens' School	Mixed	35% general ability, 5% music, 5% sport	yes	51.658°N 0.369°W
Hertfordshire	Rickmansworth School	Mixed	25% general ability, 10% music	yes	51.645°N 0.456°W
Hertfordshire	St. Clement Danes School	Mixed	10% general ability, 10% music	yes	51.664°N 0.514°W
Hertfordshire	Watford Grammar School for Boys	Boys	25% general ability, 10% music	yes	51.655°N 0.414°W
Hertfordshire	Watford Grammar School for Girls	Girls	25% general ability, 10% music	yes	51.652°N 0.396°W
Kent	Archbishop's School	Mixed	15% general ability	yes	51.293°N 1.074°E
Kent	Chaucer Technology School	Mixed	15% general ability or technology	yes	51.274°N 1.100°E
Kent	Homewood School	Mixed	20% general ability, 1% music	yes	51.079°N 0.693°E
Kent	Westlands School	Mixed	10% maths	yes	51.343°N 0.711°E
Lambeth	Archbishop Tenison's School	Boys	weighted banding	yes	51.483°N 0.116°W
Lambeth	London Nautical School	Boys	nautical or sport	yes	51.507°N 0.108°W
Lancashire	Ripley St. Thomas School, Lancaster	Mixed	15% language		
Liverpool	King David High School	Mixed	17% music	yes	53.396°N 2.900°W
Liverpool	St Hilda's Church of England High School	Girls	15% general ability	no	53.388°N 2.939°W
Liverpool	St Margaret's Church of England Academy	Boys	15% general ability	no	53.369°N 2.930°W
Nottingham	Nottingham Bluecoat School	Mixed	10% maths and science	yes	52.969°N 1.193°W
Peterborough	The Kings School	Mixed	10% general ability, 2.5% music	yes	52.582°N 0.239°W
Poole	Poole High School	Mixed	10% general ability	yes	50.725°N 1.984°W
Southend-on-Sea	Cecil Jones Academy	Mixed	10% general ability	yes	51.553°N 0.732°E
Southend-on-Sea	Shoeburyness High School	Mixed	10% general ability	yes	51.533°N 0.776°E
Surrey	The Winston Churchill School	Mixed	9% general ability, 5% music	yes	51.313°N 0.601°W
Sutton	Greenshaw High School	Mixed	24% general ability	yes	50.921°N 0.139°W
Wandsworth	Burntwood School	Girls	25% general ability	yes	51.438°N 0.180°W
Wandsworth	Chestnut Grove School	Mixed	18% art and design, 18% languages	yes	51.444°N 0.155°W
Wandsworth	Ernest Bevin Academy	Boys	⅓ general ability	yes	51.438°N 0.168°W
Wandsworth	Graveney School	Mixed	25% general ability	yes	51.424°N 0.151°W

All of these schools are over-subscribed. All except Old Swinford Hospital, Archbishop Tenison's School and the London Nautical School select the highest scoring applicants under each criterion.

== See also ==
- Education in England
