= Elizabeth Fuller (school founder) =

English school founder (1644–1709)

- Born: 1644
- Died: 1709 (aged 65); Watford, Hertfordshire
- Other name: Mrs Elizabeth Fuller
- Occupation: Benefactor
- Known for: Founding Watford Free School

Elizabeth Fuller (1644–1709) founded a Free School for boys and girls in Watford, Hertfordshire, England.

== Watford schools ==
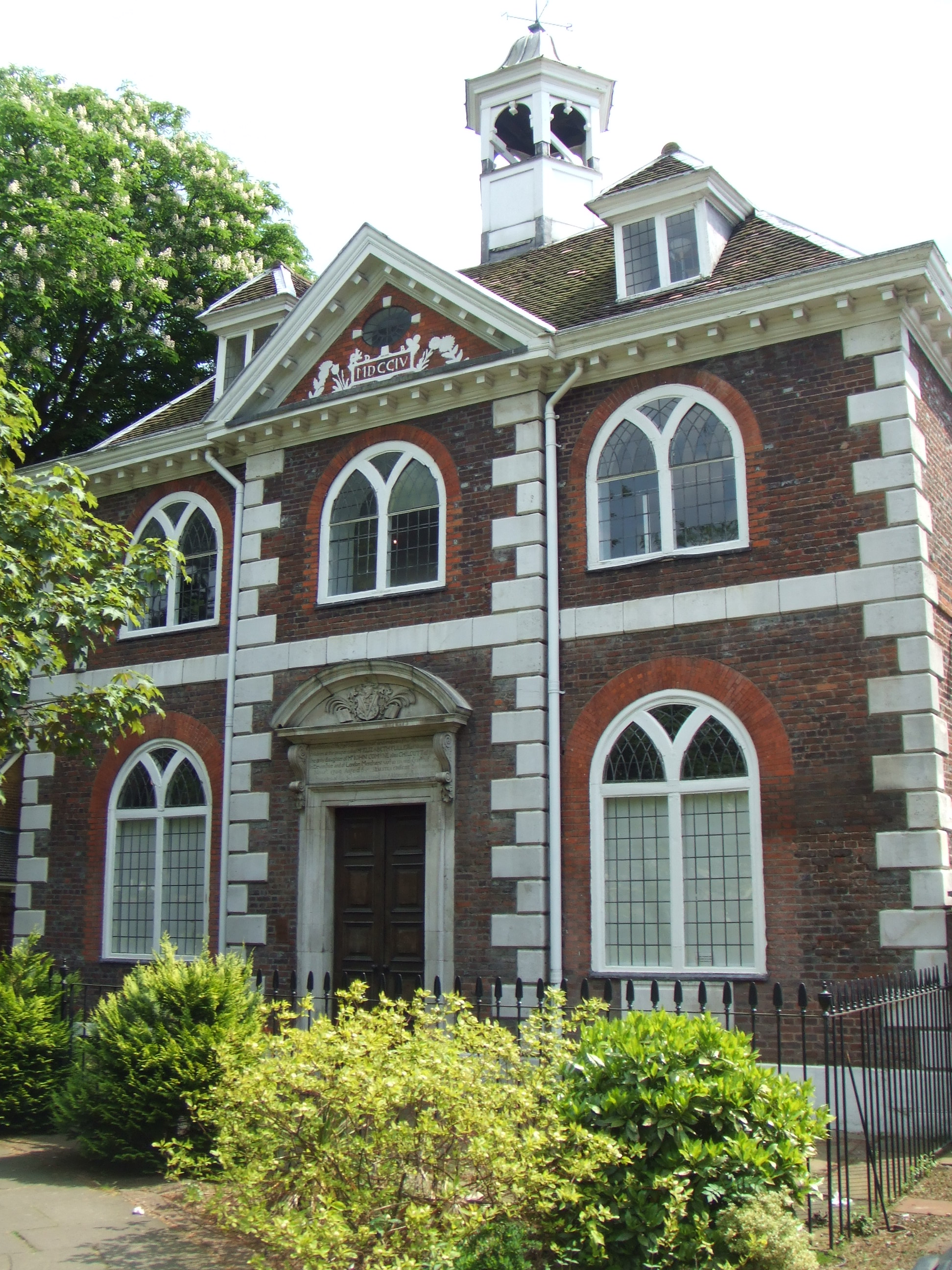
Watford Free School

At the end of the 17th century there was already an existing Free School at Watford, which Mrs Elizabeth Fuller of Watford Place found too small. In 1704 she built a new Free School for forty boys and twenty girls on her land next to the churchyard, with rooms for the Master and man, and in 18 she endowed it with £2 a year.

The Free School for boys and girls later developed into the separate Watford Grammar School for Boys and Watford Grammar School for Girls. Elizabeth Fuller is remembered every year in the present schools' Founder's Day services. Watford Grammar School for Boys and Watford Grammar School for Girls Website states:

"In 1704 Elizabeth Fuller of Watford founded a charity school on land adjoining the parish churchyard. The original building, which was known as The Free School, may still be seen. The forty boys and twenty girls were taught to read, write and 'cast accounts'. Every year we hold a Founder's Day service to commemorate the charitable foundation of Watford Grammar School for Boys. With the help of endowments and occasional gifts, Elizabeth Fuller's original charity school survived until the 1880s."

== Elizabeth Fuller's charity for sermon and bread ==
This charity was founded by Mrs Fuller in 1708. It was originally funded from her Free School endowment, but by an Order made in 1905 under the Board of Education Act 1899, £196 in Midland Railway debenture stock was transferred from the funds of the school to new Trustees to provide £3 18s. a year for distribution in bread to the poor of Watford and £1 a year to the Vicar of Watford for a sermon.
