= Richard Platt (military officer) =

Richard Platt (1754 - 1830.) was an aide-de-camp to Alexander McDougall during the Revolutionary War. Platt served as the chairman of the Committee of Arrangements in organizing New York's Federal Procession of 1788, which celebrated the ratification of the United States Constitution. Platt was also a member of the Society of the Cincinnati of the State of New York, for which he served as Treasurer alongside Alexander Hamilton, who served as the society's Vice President

== Federal Procession of 1788 ==
Platt served as the chairman of the Committee of Arrangements in organizing New York's Federal Procession of 1788, which celebrated the ratification of the United States Constitution. Contrary to popular opinion, New York had not yet ratified the Constitution by the time of that state's Federal Procession. Once news that sufficient ratification by the requisite nine states had been achieved upon New Hampshire's ratification on June 21, 1788, officials in New York City planned a celebratory procession for July 22, hoping that by that time, New York would have also ratified the constitution. Although New York still had not ratified as the planned procession's date approached, Platt determined that, due to the overwhelming public excitement surrounding the constitution's consummation, the celebratory procession could no longer be delayed, saying: "The day having been more than once postponed in the interesting hope that this state, then in its convention, would likewise accede to the Union, the Committee of Arrangements found it impossible any longer to oppose this patriotic ardor of their fellow citizens."

New York's procession was finally set for July 23, 1788. By that time, Virginia had also acceded to the constitution, bringing the total number of states which had ratified the constitution to ten. New York's procession was thus organized into ten divisions, being various groups of merchants, tradesmen, and mechanics, to celebrate those states.

== Professional Affiliations ==
On February 15, 1787, Platt was admitted as a member of the New York Manumission Society, which promoted the manumission of slaves. Another notable member of the society was Alexander Hamilton.

On July 8, 1788, Platt was appointed the Treasurer of the Society of the Cincinnati of the State of New York, serving alongside Alexander Hamilton, who on that date was appointed the society's Vice President.
