= Queen Elizabeth's School, Barnet =

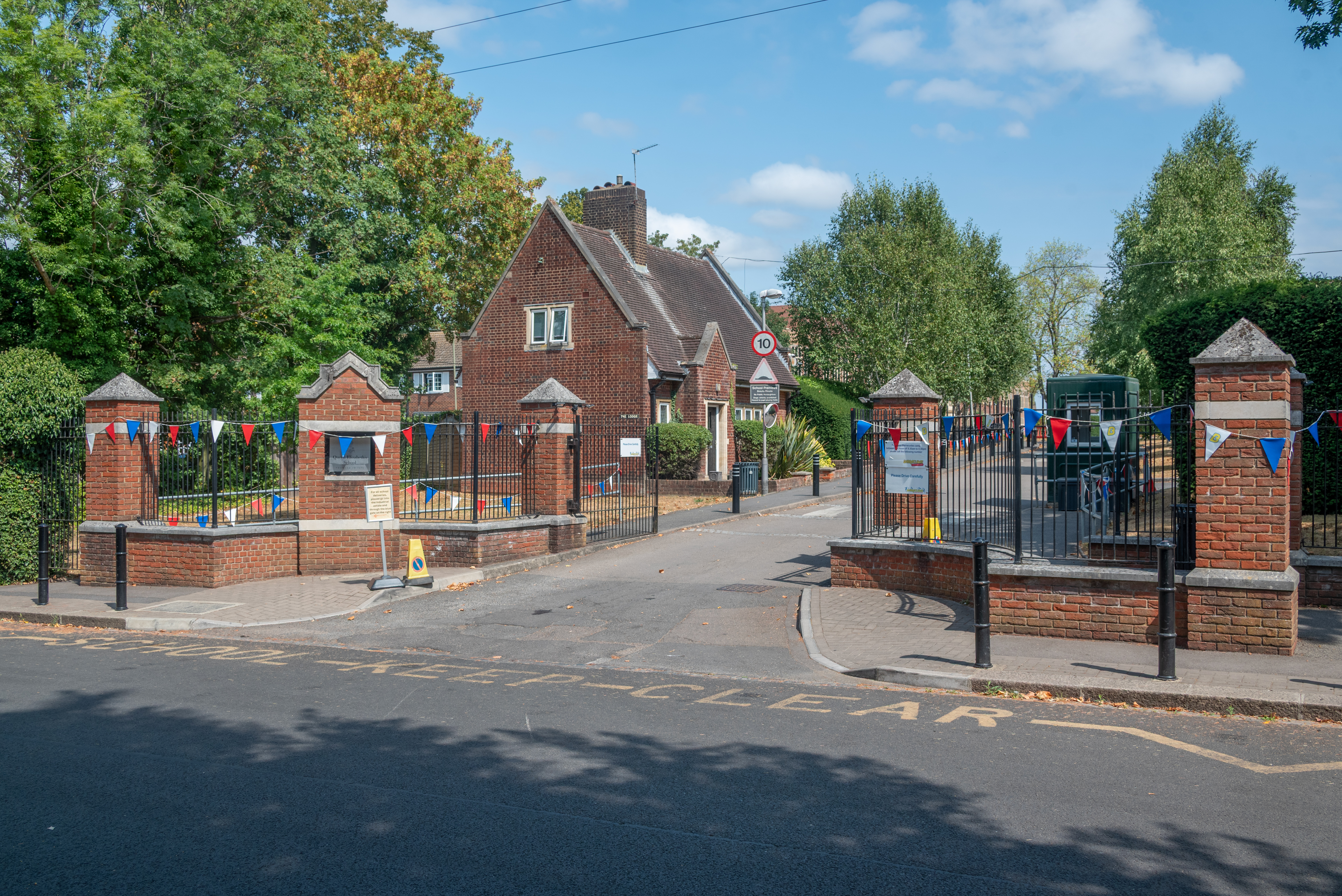

Location
- Queen's Road; Chipping Barnet; Barnet, Greater London, EN5 4DQ; England; 51.65495°N 0.21341°W

Information
- School type: Grammar School
- Motto: Dieu et mon Droit (God and my Right)
- Religious affiliation: None
- Established: 1573; 453 years ago
- Status: Open
- Local authority: Barnet (302)
- Department for Education URN: 136290 Tables
- Ofsted: Reports
- Chair of Governors: Barrie R. Martin
- Executive headteacher: Neil Enright
- Staff: 113
- Teaching staff: 87
- Gender: Boys-only
- Age: 11 to 18
- Enrollment: 1,314 (2025)
- Capacity: 1,200
- Student to teacher ratio: 15:1
- Campus size: 23-acre (0.093 km^{2})
- Campus type: Suburban
- Houses: Broughton; Leicester; Harrisons; Stapylton; Pearce; Underne
- Colours: Navy and pale blue
- Endowment: £23,303,827 (2017)
- Budget: £8.19m (2017–18)
- Revenue: £8.16m (2017–18)
- Alumni: Old Elizabethans
- Boarding pupils: None
- Publications: The Elizabethan (official school magazine); The Arabella (student-edited arts magazine); QE Connect (school e-magazine)
- Website: www.qebarnet.co.uk

Queen Elizabeth's School, Barnet (also known as QE Boys) is a selective state grammar school and academy for boys aged 11–18 in Chipping Barnet, north-west London. It was founded in 1573 by Robert Dudley, 1st Earl of Leicester, and others, in the name of Queen Elizabeth I.

The school has consistently ranked among the most academically successful secondary schools in England, topping A-level league tables for grammar schools for five consecutive years as of 2016, and was named State Secondary School of the Year by The Sunday Times in 2001, 2007, 2022 and 2026.

In September 2024, the school announced plans to establish affiliated fee-paying schools overseas, including campuses in Dubai, United Arab Emirates, and Gurgaon, India, due to open in 2026, with a further school planned at GIFT City, Gujarat, India. The schools will be run through a partnership with GEDU Global Education a UK company.

== History ==
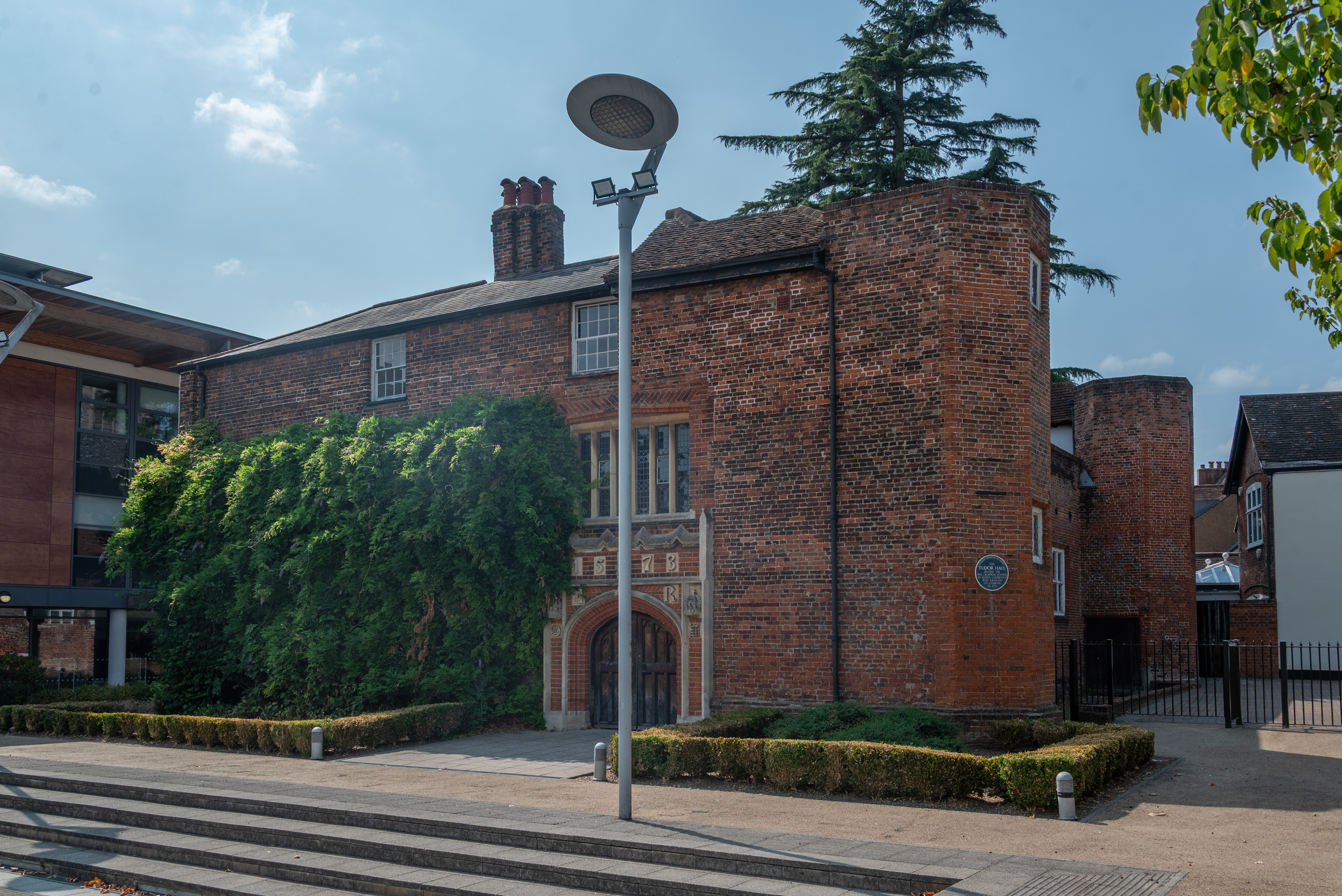
Tudor Hall, the original 16^{th} century schoolhouse

=== Foundation and early history ===
The school was founded in 1573 by Queen Elizabeth I, petitioned by Robert Dudley, Earl of Leicester, and assisted by local alderman Edward Underne. Elizabeth I's charter of 1573 describes the school's purpose thus:

Bringing up and instruction of boys and youth, to be brought up in grammar and other learning, and the same to continue for ever, and the said School for one Master and one Usher for ever to continue and remain and that there shall be for ever four-and-twenty discreet, honest governors

The original Tudor building, known as Tudor Hall, was erected in 1577 opposite the Church of St John the Baptist on Wood Street, with money raised by the first governors of the school and by collections in London churches. It was repaired in 1597 and again in 1637. During the 17th century, further extensive repairs were carried out, in spite of a poor financial situation following the Civil War. Financial conditions became progressively more comfortable during the 18th century.

The trustees of Elizabeth Allen's Charity, which had been established by her will dated 10 February 1725, gave financial assistance to save it from a state "very ruinous and unfit for habitation". It then became a private boarding school. In 1851, Charles Dickens criticised the school, using a disguised name for it, in an article called "A Free (and Easy) School"; an account of Queen Elizabeth's "Royal Grammar School at Thistledown"", in his magazine Household Words. He said that the school was failing to carry out the purpose for which it had been established. It was closed in 1872 and restored in 1874 with many additions. In 1885 a governor, H. E. Chetwynd Stapylton, bought a plot of land behind the Jesus Hospital, an almshouse building in Wood Street dating back to 1679; today the Stapylton Field stands in front of the main school building and is used for rugby and cricket.

Two plaques are located on the walls of the original school building, Tudor Hall. Inscribed on the stone plaque is:

This is to commemorate the original school founded here by Queen Elizabeth and built in 1573. The school was removed in 1932 to new building in Queens Road, Barnet. This plaque was erected by the Visitors of Jesus Hospital Charity, the owners in 1952.

A more recent blue plaque was erected by the London borough of Barnet which dictates:

This Tudor Hall housed the free grammar school of Queen Elizabeth I who granted its charter in 1573.

=== Move to Queen's Road ===
As the number of pupils outgrew the capacity of Tudor Hall, so the school was transferred in 1932 to a new site in Queen's Road, which backed on to the Stapylton Field.

During the Second World War the athletics coach Franz Stampfl taught physical education at the school until his internment in 1940 as an enemy alien.

It was administered by the South Herts Division of Hertfordshire County Council, until 1965 when it became part of the borough of Barnet. In the 1960s, there were around 550 boys with 150 in the sixth form. Tudor Hall was restored in 1968 by the London Borough of Barnet, and is now part of Barnet and Southgate College. The future headmaster of Eton, John Lewis, briefly taught Latin in the early 1970s.

=== Grammar school reinstatement ===
In the 1980s, the local authority planned to close the school, as it was identified as a failing school. Under Eamonn Harris (headmaster from 1984 to 1999), it returned to its previous selective grammar school status in August 1994, having opted out of the London borough and become a grant-maintained school in 1989. Other schools in Greater London did this, and many became partially selective (up to 50%) at this time. In the 1990s it went on to become England's top state school for A-levels.

The girls' school remained a comprehensive.

=== Recent developments ===
In April 2000, a group of current and former pupils created a website to discuss their experiences at the school. This was known as 'QE Boys: The Truth'. It gained more hits than the official website, and the school excluded three pupils for posting messages on it.

The school has been a training school since April 2009.

From 2006 onwards, the School's Estates Strategy, currently running from its 450th anniversary in 2023 until 2035, has made improvements to the school's facilities, which include a multi-purpose concert/assembly hall, a recital hall, a 200-seat drama studio and lecture theatre, a 25-metre 8-lane swimming pool, additional classrooms and a library which has tripled in size. Much of the additional funding needed for the new facilities has come from a charitable trust, The Friends of Queen Elizabeth's, which receives donations from former pupils, parents and other supporters of the School. In 2025, it raised an annual income of £2,211,565.

Crispin Bonham-Carter, a former television and film actor, has been assistant headteacher at the school since 2019.

=== International expansion ===
In September 2024, the school announced a partnership with Global Education (GEDU) to establish three affiliated overseas schools under the Queen Elizabeth's School name and branding. The overseas schools were described as separate institutions with their own headteachers, senior leadership teams and teaching staff; unlike QE Barnet, they would be co-educational and fee-paying rather than state-funded.

By early 2026, the first two schools, in Dubai Sports City, UAE and Gurgaon, India, were reported to be due to open in August 2026, with a third planned at GIFT City in Gujarat, India. The Dubai school had received approval from Dubai's Knowledge and Human Development Authority, was accepting applications from nursery to Year 8, and was reported to be following the English national curriculum, with iGCSE and A-level courses planned. In March 2026, published annual fees ranged from AED 93,500 for nursery to AED 136,604 for Year 8.

== Culture and sports ==
Queen Elizabeth's School is divided into six houses, named after famous alumni, patrons and former teachers. They are Broughton, Harrisons', Leicester, Pearce, Stapylton and Underne.

The school's sports facilities include a swimming pool and a field. Rugby union, played during the winter and spring terms, is compulsory for boys in their first four years at the school, as are cross country running and most other school sports, which include orienteering, swimming, water polo, basketball, tennis, cricket, Eton fives, and athletics. Queen Elizabeth's frequently play against other schools, most notably private Schools like Haberdashers' Boys School.

The percentage of boys attending the school who are eligible for free school meals is 3.7%.

The Founder's Day Fête, and the preceding service of celebration at St John the Baptist's Church, Barnet, is held every year, regardless of weather, on the third Saturday in June, and celebrates the founding of the school in 1573.

Since 2002, the school has supported the Sri Sathya Sai English Medium School in Vellanad, Kerala, through sixth-form fundraising to sponsor pupils’ education, alongside occasional work-experience visits by QE leavers.

== Academic performance ==
In 2007, QE came first in the A-level league table for state schools, and twelfth in the GCSE league table. In 2008, QE again topped the league table in A-level results.

In 2024, the school reported that more than 95% of GCSE entries were graded 7–9. The school has also stated that, from 2005 to 2025, more than 95% of its A-level entries were awarded grades A* to B.

In The Sunday Times school tables for 2026, Queen Elizabeth's School was ranked joint fifth among state and independent secondary schools in the United Kingdom. 52.4% of the school's A-level entries were awarded A* grades, 85.5% were awarded A*–A, and 97.6% were awarded A*–B, placing it fourth nationally for A-level performance. The table also recorded 95.5% of GCSE entries at grades 9–7, placing the school joint 17th nationally.

== Notable alumni ==
- Richard Aylard, former advisor to the then-Prince Charles
- Beardyman, musical producer
- Tim Bell, advisor to Margaret Thatcher
- John Biggs, Mayor of Tower Hamlets
- Edward Blishen, writer
- William Broughton, first Bishop of Australia
- Wilfred De'Ath, writer and broadcaster
- Jay Foreman, YouTuber, comedian and songwriter
- George the Poet, spoken-word poet
- Lucian Grainge, record executive
- Demis Hassabis, artificial intelligence researcher and entrepreneur, co-founder of Google DeepMind
- Kelvin Hopkins, Labour Member of Parliament (MP) for Luton North since 1997
- Allastair McReady-Diarmid, army officer, Victoria Cross recipient in World War I
- Duncan Maskell, biochemist, academic and vice-chancellor of the University of Melbourne
- Robert Rinder, barrister and television personality
- Jay Shetty, podcaster and entrepreneur
- Mustafa Suleyman, artificial intelligence researcher and entrepreneur, co-founder of Inflection AI, CEO of Microsoft AI
- Peter Wells, athlete and high jumper

== Other information ==
=== Admissions procedure ===
Admission to the school is strictly by academic selection, and boys may apply to join the school for Year 7. Roughly 3,600 applicants compete in a series of examinations to be awarded one of the 192 places offered annually, making places at the grammar school some of the most sought after and oversubscribed in the country.

Parents of boys not admitted to the school have protested against the school's selective admissions policy. Sometimes this has been because the prospective boy's parents have moved to the area assuming a place will be guaranteed, when this is not the case. The school was also on a list of schools breaching admissions laws in England. The Barnet education authority asked for an investigation by Her Majesty's Inspectorate.

=== Contribution requests ===
In 2014 it was reported that the school, despite not being of independent school status, was making regular requests to parents for 'voluntary donations' in order to provide the facilities pupils needed, with parents contributing monthly, usually around £60. The school justified these requests by saying that state funding was not sufficient to provide a sound education and "the polish for boys to go on to the best universities".
