= Watford Grammar School for Girls =

Location
- Lady's Close; Watford, Hertfordshire, WD18 0AE; England; 51.6515°N 0.3962°W

Information
- Type: Partially selective academy
- Motto: Sperate parati ("Go forward with preparation")
- Established: 1704; 322 years ago 1884 (refounded)
- Founder: Elizabeth Fuller
- Department for Education URN: 136289 Tables
- Ofsted: Reports
- Chairman of governors: Nick Moorhouse
- Headmistress: Mrs Wilshaw
- Gender: Girls
- Age: 11 to 18
- Enrolment: 1,550
- Colours: Navy blue and yellow
- Website: http://www.watfordgrammarschoolforgirls.org.uk/

Watford Grammar School for Girls (commonly abbreviated WGGS) is an academy for girls in Watford in Hertfordshire, England. Despite its name, it is only a partially selective school, with 25% of entrants admitted on academic ability and 10% on musical aptitude.

Its GCSE results were the highest achieved by non-grammar state schools in England in 2007.

== History ==
The school and its brother school, Watford Grammar School for Boys, descend from a free school founded as a charity school for boys and girls by Elizabeth Fuller in 1704 and refounded as a secondary school in 1884.

The school has occupied its present site in central Watford since 1907. The name Watford Grammar School for Girls dates from 1903. Although the school ceased to be a tripartite system grammar school in 1975, it retains some features of the grammar school tradition.

The school site is divided in two by a public footpath, with a footbridge spanning the path to connect the two parts. The northern part includes a former private house, Lady's Close now used as the English block. Also in the northern part is the PE block and Fuller Life Gym (with a swimming pool), open to members of the public in non-school hours. A new building, Hyde House, is also situated in the northern part. Except during the First World War, when it was taken over by the Red Cross as an auxiliary hospital, the building served as the school's preparatory department until that department was closed in 1944. Since then it has served as the home of the entry form to the school.

== The school today ==
Watford Girls has been partially selective since 1995, though the proportion of selection has been reduced over this period. The school also gives priority to sisters of current pupils at the school. Prior to 2008 it also gave extra consideration during the selection process to sisters of pupils of Watford Grammar School for Boys. Its admission area reaches out about 5 miles (8 km), including some northern parts of the London boroughs of Harrow and Hillingdon. In comparison with the national average, its intake has significantly higher academic attainment, greater ethnic diversity and fewer children receiving free school meals.

An inspection in 2007 by the Office for Standards in Education rated the school as outstanding in all categories. It has long been near the top of performance tables for comprehensive schools, but when the key measure at GCSE was changed in 2007 to include English and mathematics the school moved to the top position. The then-headmistress, Dame Helen Hyde, attributed part of their success to De Bono Thinking Tools, for which the school was one of the first in the United Kingdom to receive accreditation as a national training school.

== Notable former pupils ==
- Claire Hallissey, British distance runner
- Geri Halliwell (pop singer and former Spice Girl) attended the school up to GCSE.
- Liz Kendall, Member of Parliament (MP) for Leicester West from 2010 onwards.
- Rebecca Saire, actress
- Rita Simons, actress in EastEnders
- Emma Wiggs, canoeist, and Paralympic gold medallist
- Sarah Wollaston, Member of Parliament from 2010 until 2019

== Headmistresses ==
(since the founding of the secondary school in 1884)

- 1884 Louise Walsh
- 1884–1895 Julia Anne Kennaby (married name Rogers from 1893)
- 1895–1913 Ann Coless
- 1913–1938 Grace Fergie
- 1938–1956 Jean Davidson
- 1957–1973 Jessie Tennet
- 1974–1987 Margaret Rhodes
- 1987–2016 Dame Helen Hyde
- 2016–2017 Clare Wagner
- 2017–2026 Sylvia Tai
- 2026–present Christina Wilshaw

== Forms ==
Forms range from Year 7 to Year 13.

- A - Red
- B - Yellow
- C - Blue
- D - Purple
- E - White
- F - Pink
- G - Green
- H - Orange

== See also ==
- Watford Grammar School for Boys
