= Tudor Hall, Chipping Barnet =

Building in Chipping Barnet, London

Coordinates: 51°39′10″N 0°12′03″W

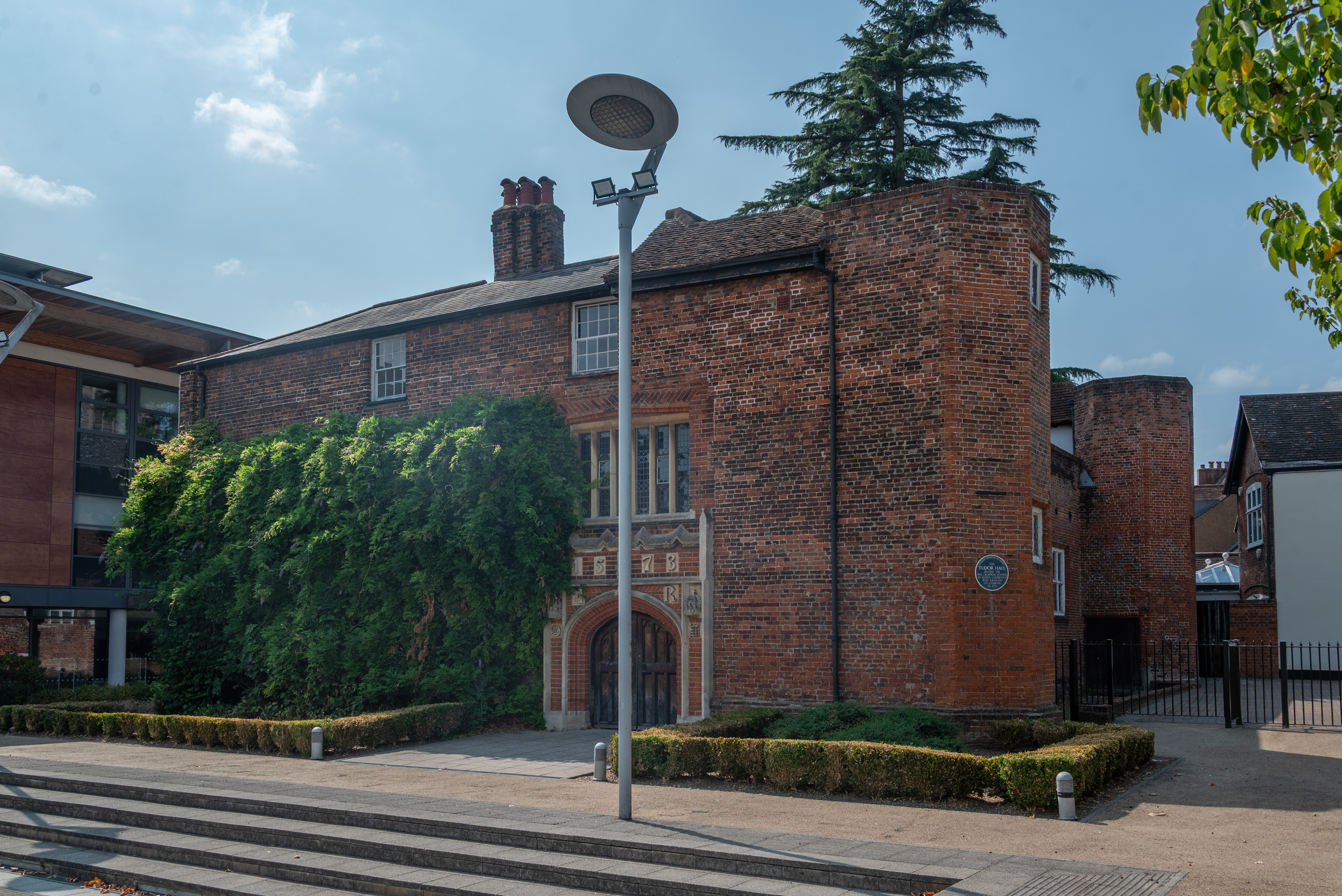
Tudor Hall

Tudor Hall in Wood Street, Chipping Barnet, is the original site of Queen Elizabeth's School, Barnet, and is now occupied by Barnet and Southgate College. It was built around 1577 following the granting of a charter for the school by Queen Elizabeth I in 1573 and is a grade II listed building with Historic England.
