= Barnet and Southgate College =

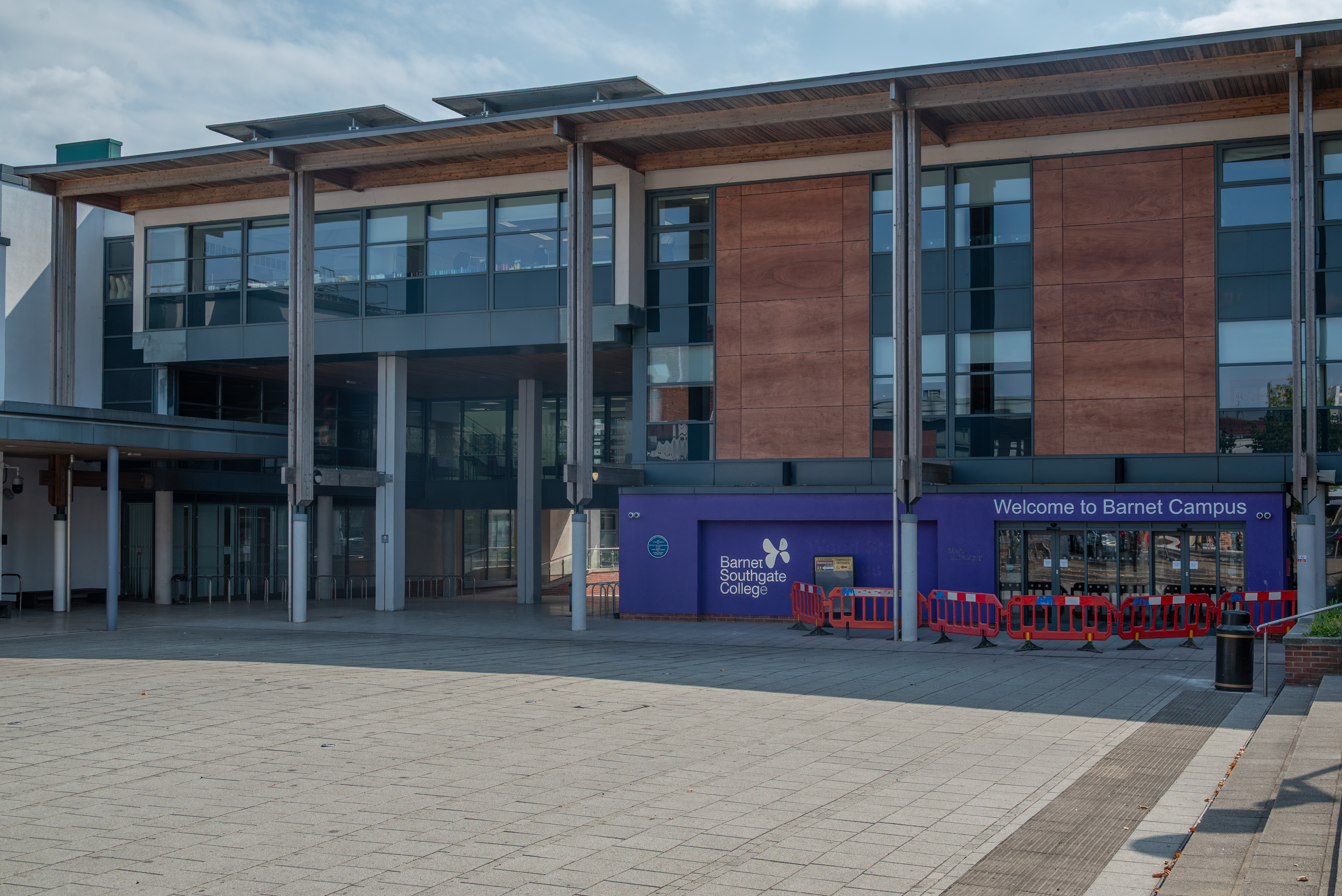
- Wood Street campus in Chipping Barnet

Location
- Wood Street; Chipping Barnet, Greater London, EN5 4AZ; England

Information
- Type: Further Education
- Established: Pre-2011 – previous institutions 2011 – Barnet and Southgate College
- Local authority: Barnet
- Department for Education URN: 130425 Tables
- Ofsted: Reports
- CEO: Neil Coker (from April 2024)
- Gender: Coeducational
- Age: 16++
- Enrolment: 14,000
- Website: www.barnetsouthgate.ac.uk

Barnet and Southgate College is a further education college in North London, England. The current college was established in 2011. It has three main campuses and two other learning centres in the London Borough of Barnet and the London Borough of Enfield, predominantly serving students from these areas. Over 14,000 students are enrolled as of 2018.

== History ==
The college was formed on 1 November 2011 with the merger between Barnet College and Southgate College.

Barnet College was established in 2000 as a merger between the old Barnet College and Hendon College. The Wood Street campus of Barnet College for Further Education had been used for vocational education since the 19th century. Apart from this the college had campuses in Whetstone and North Finchley. Hendon College for Further Education was created in 1973 when the Hendon College of Technology became part of Middlesex Polytechnic, later Middlesex University. As of 1994 the college had four sites, in Colindale, Hendon, Burnt Oak and Mill Hill, with 8,000 enrollments with about 3,000 being full-time study.

Southgate College was founded as Southgate Technical College in 1962, and its buildings on the high street were completed in 1963.

== Courses ==
Courses taught include academic qualifications (such as AS and A Levels), to more vocational studies such as City and Guilds courses and BTEC diplomas. The College also runs higher education courses (such as Foundation degrees) in a number of subjects.

== College campuses ==
- Wood Street Campus, Barnet (includes Tudor Hall, the original site of Queen Elizabeth's School). The Wood Street Campus reopened in September 2010 following a £50 million redevelopment, and provides a centre for its learners in the heart of High Barnet.
- Colindale Campus, Colindale. The Colindale Campus opened in August 2016 and runs vocational and short skills training courses, centred around Hairdressing (The Wella Centre of Excellence), Beauty and Construction.
- Southgate Campus, Southgate. The Southgate Campus runs Academic and Vocational courses and is home to the College's sports academies. The Southgate Campus includes automotive and electrical workshops, and has a Centre of Excellence for Learners with Learning Difficulties and/or Disabilities. The college is partnered with Tottenham Hotspur Football Club, with Tottenham's academy coaches delivering the technical football components at the Southgate campus and the college issuing the educational qualifications.
- Edmonton Green Campus, Edmonton. This is the off-site provision for the Southgate Campus and works at improving community cohesion in and around the Edmonton Green area. The Centre offers educational opportunities to students not previously available to them.

=== Locations ===
Location	Coordinates
Wood Street Campus	51°39′08″N 0°12′01″W
Southgate Campus	51°59′41″N 0°13′01″W
Edmonton Green Campus	51°39′08″N 0°12′01″W

== Notable alumni ==
- Mehmet Aksoy (1985–2017), Turkish-Kurdish film-maker and YPG press officer
- Nicko McBrain (b. 1952), drummer for Iron Maiden
- Peter Banks, (1947–2013) guitarist of Yes and Flash
- Ozwald Boateng (b. 1967), fashion designer
- Emma Bunton (b. 1976), aka 'Baby Spice' singer and member of pop group Spice Girls
- Rick Wills (b. 1947), bassist for Foreigner, Small Faces, Bad Company and The Jones Gang
- Andy Summers (b. 1942), singer and guitarist for The Police, Soft Machine, The Animals

== Sports ==
- Southgate College RLFC

== See also ==
- List of UCAS institutions
- List of universities in the United Kingdom
