= 1891 in art =

The year 1891 in art involved some significant events.

== Events ==
- March 29 – French Post-Impressionist painter Georges Seurat dies aged 31 in Paris, having completed around 45 canvases in his lifetime and known to have sold only three.
- May 10 – Danish sculptor Anne Marie Brodersen marries her compatriot, the classical composer Carl Nielsen, in St Mark's English Church, Florence, the couple having first met on March 2 in Paris.
- June – Sidney Paget produces his first illustrations for Arthur Conan Doyle's Sherlock Holmes stories in The Strand Magazine.
- Henri Matisse begins his studies at the Académie Julian.
- Correspondence of Marie Bashkirtseff and Gustave Flaubert is published.
- Paul Gauguin sails to French Polynesia.
- Impressionist Armand Guillaumin wins 100,000 francs in the French state lottery and is able to devote himself to painting full-time.
- Félix Vallotton makes his first woodcuts.

== Works ==
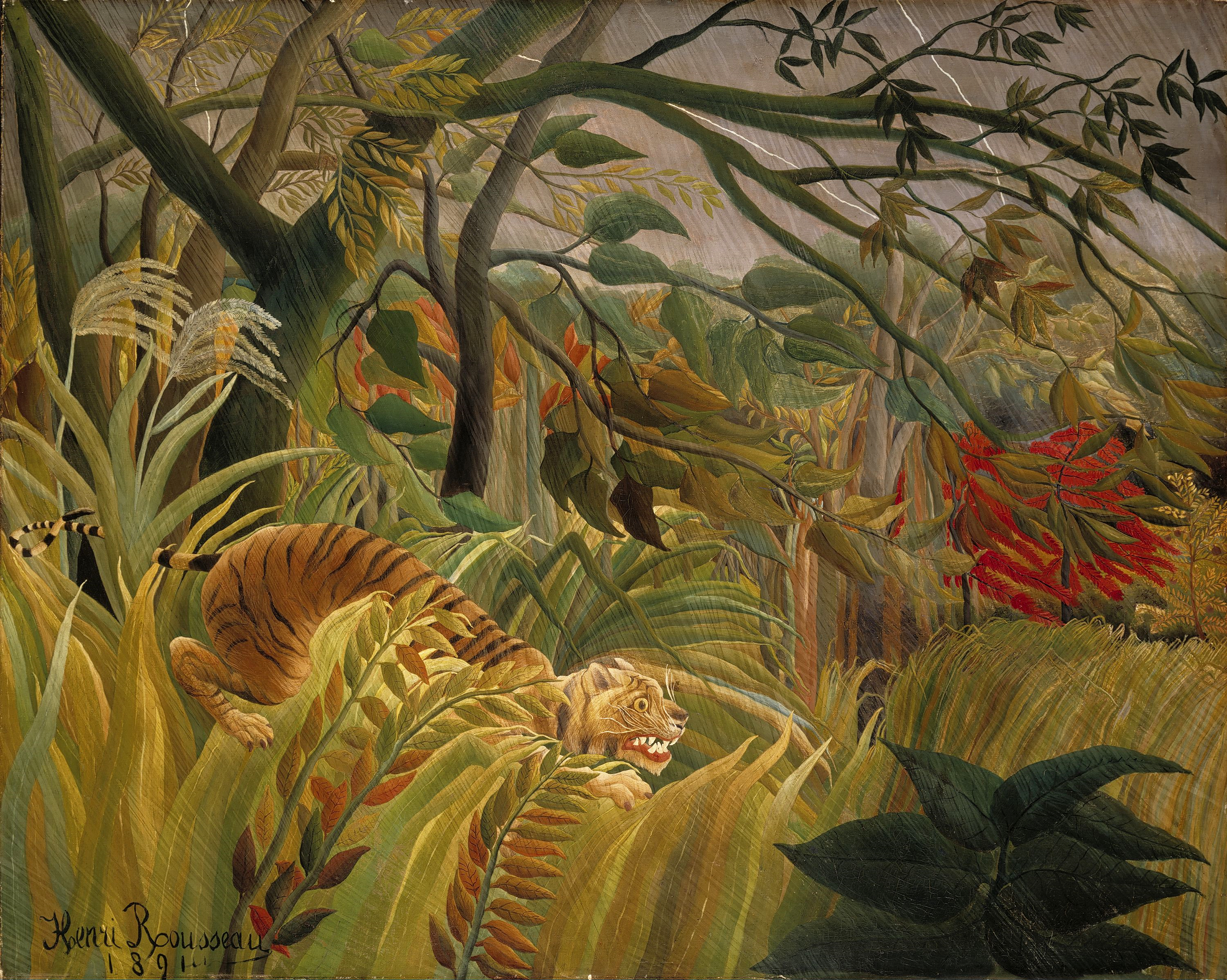
Henri Rousseau – Tiger in a Tropical Storm

- William-Adolphe Bouguereau
  - The Goose Girl
  - Work Interrupted
- Frank Bramley – For Of Such Is The Kingdom Of Heaven
- Edward Burne-Jones – Sponsa de Libano
- Philip Hermogenes Calderon – Saint Elizabeth of Hungary's Great Act of Renunciation
- Milly Childers – Hugh Culling Eardley Childers
- Pierre Puvis de Chavannes – The Shepherd's Song
- Édouard Detaille – Vive L'Empereur: charge du quatrième hussards à la bataille de Friedland, 14 juin 1807
- Alexander Doyle – Statue of Henry W. Grady
- Thomas Eakins – Miss Amelia Van Buren (Phillips Collection, Washington, D.C.)
- James Ensor – Skeletons Fighting Over a Pickled Herring (Royal Museums of Fine Arts of Belgium, Brussels)
- Luke Fildes – The Doctor
- Akseli Gallen-Kallela – Aino Triptych (second version)
- Paul Gauguin
  - Tahitian Women on the Beach
  - ‘’Ia Orana Maria’’
  - ‘’Tahitian Woman with a Flower**
  - ‘’The Meal (The Bananas)’’
- J. W. Godward
  - Innocent Amusement
  - A Pompeian Lady
  - The Sweet Siesta of a Summer Day
- Hubert von Herkomer
  - In the Black Country
  - On Strike
- Carl Kahler – My Wife's Lovers
- Benjamin Williams Leader – The Excavation of the Manchester Ship Canal: Eastham Cutting with Mount Manisty in the Distance
- Sir Frederic Leighton – Perseus and Andromeda
- John Henry Lorimer – The Ordination of Elders in a Scottish Kirk
- Frederick William MacMonnies – Statue of James S. T. Stranahan
- Jan Matejko – Constitution of May 3, 1791
- John Everett Millais – Glen Birnam
- Claude Monet
  - The Haystack Series
  - The Poplar Series
- Edvard Munch – Melancholy (first version)
- Mikhail Nesterov – The Vision of the Youth Bartholomew
- Edward Poynter – When the World was Young
- Henrietta Rae – Miss Nightingale at Scutari (1854)
- Paul Ranson – Witches Around the Fire
- Ilya Repin – Reply of the Zaporozhian Cossacks
- Tom Roberts – A break away!
- Henri Rousseau – Tiger in a Tropical Storm
- Augustus Saint-Gaudens – Adams Memorial
- John Singer Sargent – Egyptians Raising Water from the Nile
- Giovanni Segantini
  - Midday in the Alps
  - The Punishment of Lust
- Georges Seurat – The Circus (left incomplete; Musée d'Orsay, Paris)
- John "Hans" Staehli – Chiming Fountain, Portland, Oregon
- Henri de Toulouse-Lautrec – Moulin Rouge: La Goulue (color lithographic poster)
- Hubert von Herkomer – On Strike
- Edward Arthur Walton – Bluette
- J. W. Waterhouse – Circe Offering the Cup to Ulysses
- George Frederic Watts – After the Deluge

== Births ==
- January 21 – Franz Sedlacek, Austrian painter (died 1945)
- February 13 – Grant Wood, American painter (died 1942)
- April 2 – Max Ernst, German painter, sculptor, graphic artist and poet (died 1976)
- April 4 – Virgilio Guidi, Italian painter (died 1984)
- April 7 – David Low, New Zealand-born editorial cartoonist (died 1963)
- May 10 – Mahmoud Mokhtar, Egyptian sculptor (died 1934)
- June 8 – Audrey Munson, American actress and artist's model (died 1996)
- June 19 – John Heartfield, born Helmut Herzfeld, German graphic designer (died 1968)
- June 30 - Stanley Spencer, English painter (died 1959)
- August 15 – Iva Despić-Simonović, Croatian sculptor (died 1961)
- August 25 – Alberto Savinio, Italian writer, painter and composer (died 1952)
- September 22 – Alma Thomas, African American abstract expressionist painter (died 1978)
- October 7 – Charles R. Chickering, American illustrator (died 1970)
- October 11 – George Ault, American painter (died 1948)
- December 2 – Otto Dix, German painter and graphic artist (died 1969)
- December 5 – Alexander Rodchenko, Russian constructivist artist and designer (died 1956)
- December 9 – Mark Gertler, British painter (died 1939)

== Deaths ==
- January 27 – Jervis McEntee, American painter of the Hudson River School (born 1828)
- January 30 – Charles Joshua Chaplin, French painter and engraver (born 1825)
- January 31 – Jean-Louis-Ernest Meissonier, French classicist painter (born 1815)
- February 9 – Johan Jongkind, Dutch painter (born 1819)
- March 19 – Ernest Hoschedé, French businessman and collector of Impressionist paintings (born 1837)
- March 26 – Herman Frederik Carel ten Kate, Dutch watercolorist (born 1822)
- March 29 – Georges Seurat, French Post-Impressionist painter (born 1859)
- April 5 – Daniel Cottier, Scottish-born artist and designer (born 1837)
- April 14 – Carlos Luis de Ribera y Fieve, Spanish painter, son of Juan Antonio Ribera (born 1815)
- May 12 – Louisa Beresford, Marchioness of Waterford, British Pre-Raphaelite watercolourist (born 1818)
- May 16 – John Banvard, American panorama painter (born 1815)
- September 5 – Jules-Élie Delaunay, French academic painter (born 1828)
- September 6 – Elise Arnberg, Swedish miniaturist and photographer (born 1826)
- September 9 – William Theed, English sculptor (born 1804)
- September 11 – Théodule Ribot, French realist painter (born 1823)
- September 15 – John Steell, Scottish portrait sculptor (born 1804)
- October 30 – Truman Seymour, American soldier and painter (born 1824)
