= Eventide: A Scene in the Westminster Union =

1878 painting by Hubert von Herkomer

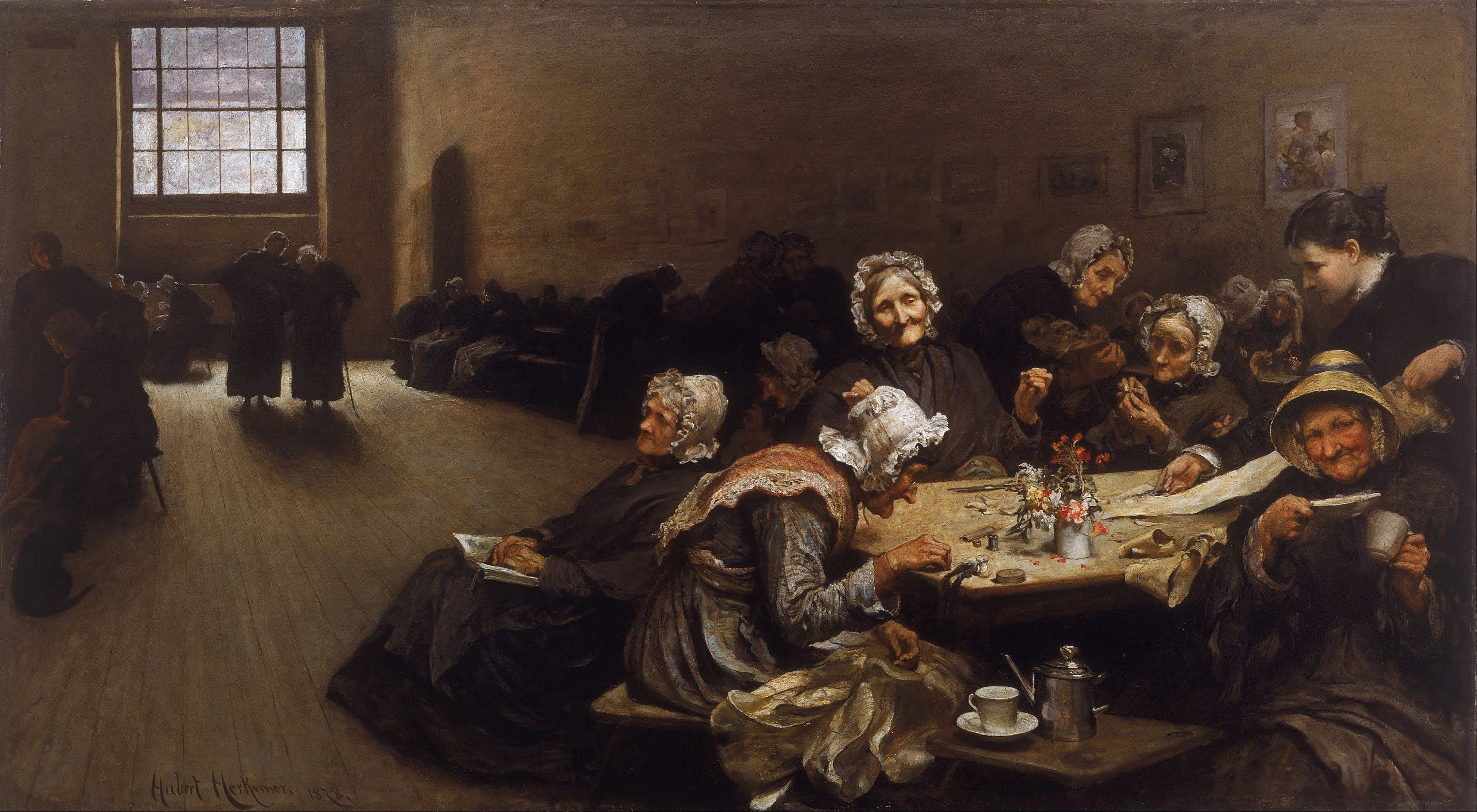
Hubert von Herkomer, Eventide – A Scene at the Westminster Union, 1878, Walker Art Gallery

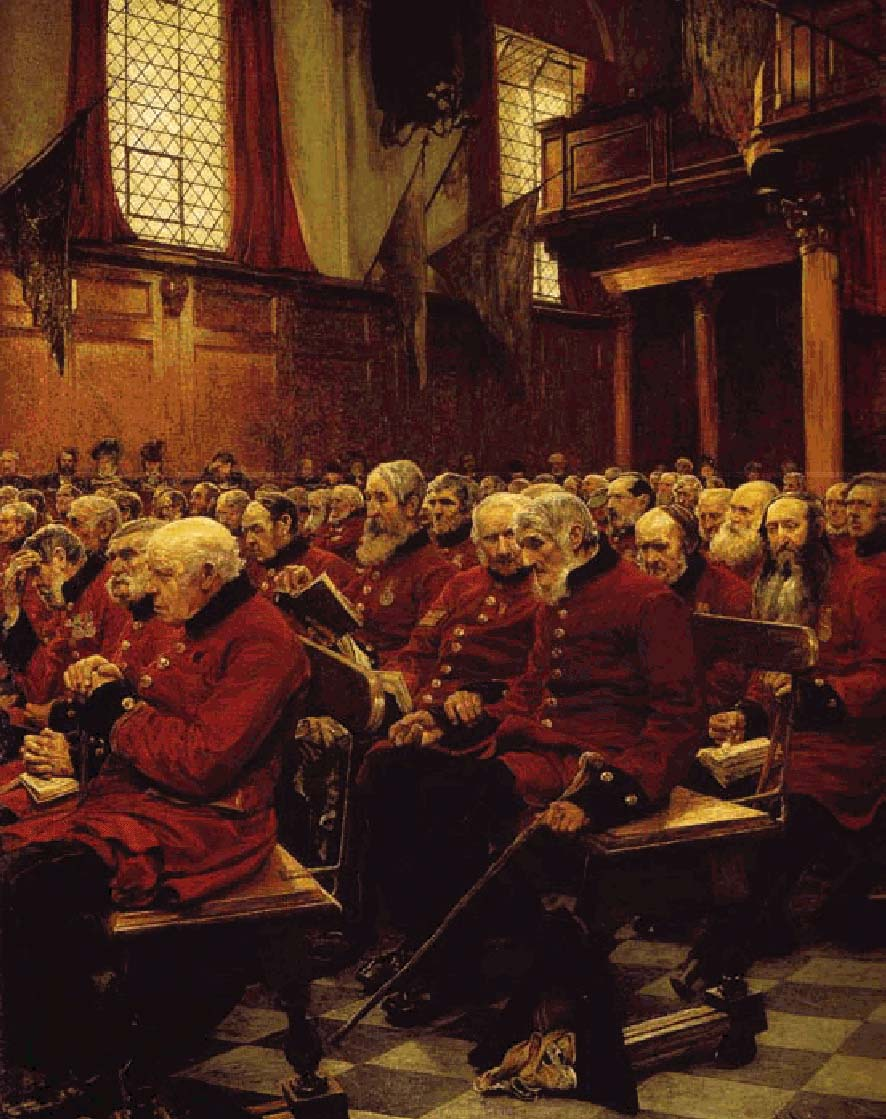
Herkomer's 1875 painting, The Last Muster, Lady Lever Art Gallery

Eventide: A Scene at the Westminster Union is an 1878 work by the social realist painter Hubert von Herkomer. It depicts women at St James's Workhouse, in Soho, London. The original painting, and a watercolour study, are held by the Walker Art Gallery, Liverpool. It is considered a companion picture to Herkomer's The Last Muster, which is held by the Lady Lever Art Gallery, also on Merseyside.

The painting measures 198.5 cm × 110.5 cm (78.1 in × 43.5 in), and it is signed and dated "Hubert Herkomer 1878". It is based on three drawings that Herkomer made for The Graphic magazine, particularly his 1877 engraving "'Old Age – A Study at the Westminster Union". Although sparsely furnished and decorated, Herkomer depicts the workhouse as a relatively comfortable place. The distorted perspective emphasises the cluster of women in the right foreground. Several cheerful elderly women in bonnets are sitting around a table, which is covered with white table cloth and has flowers in a vase. There are also prints on the wall (including one of the main figures from Herkomer's The Last Muster: the elderly Chelsea pensioner checking the pulse of his neighbouring veteran, presumed dead, at a church service). Most of the women are sewing, while one with a straw hat has poured tea into a saucer to drink, and another has a bible resting in her lap. A young woman stands nearby. More groups of women are in the shadows to the left, including one supporting another walking with a stick away from a large window.

The painting was well received as a depiction of a truthful scene, and for its evocation of sentiment, but criticised for its gloomy subject. It was exhibited at the Royal Academy in 1878, and purchased from the Liverpool Autumn Exhibition that year. It was praised when it was exhibited at the Paris Salon of 1879.

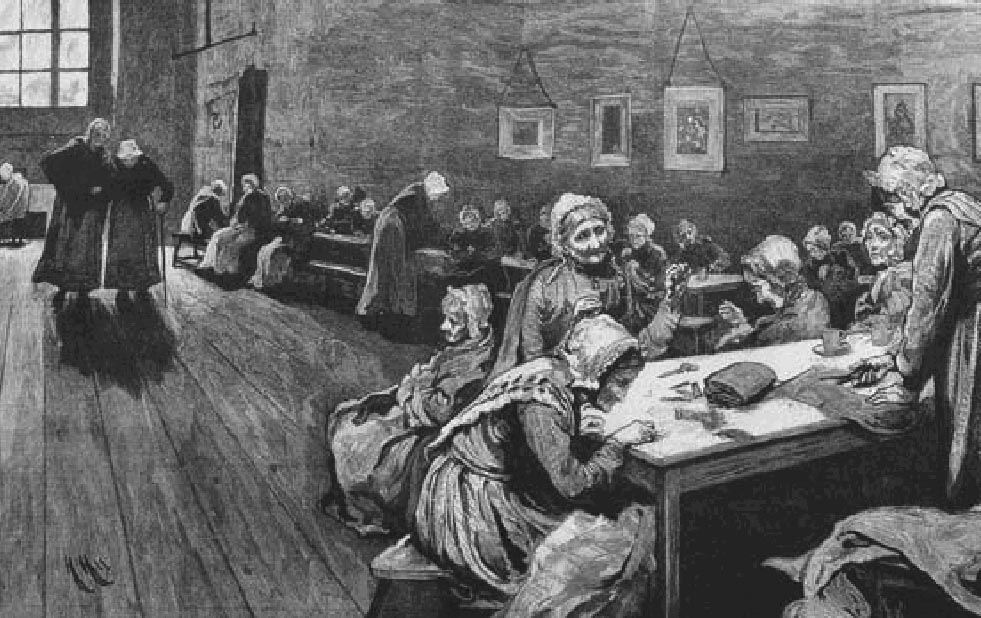
Herkomer's 1877 engraving, "'Old Age - A Study at the Westminster Union"

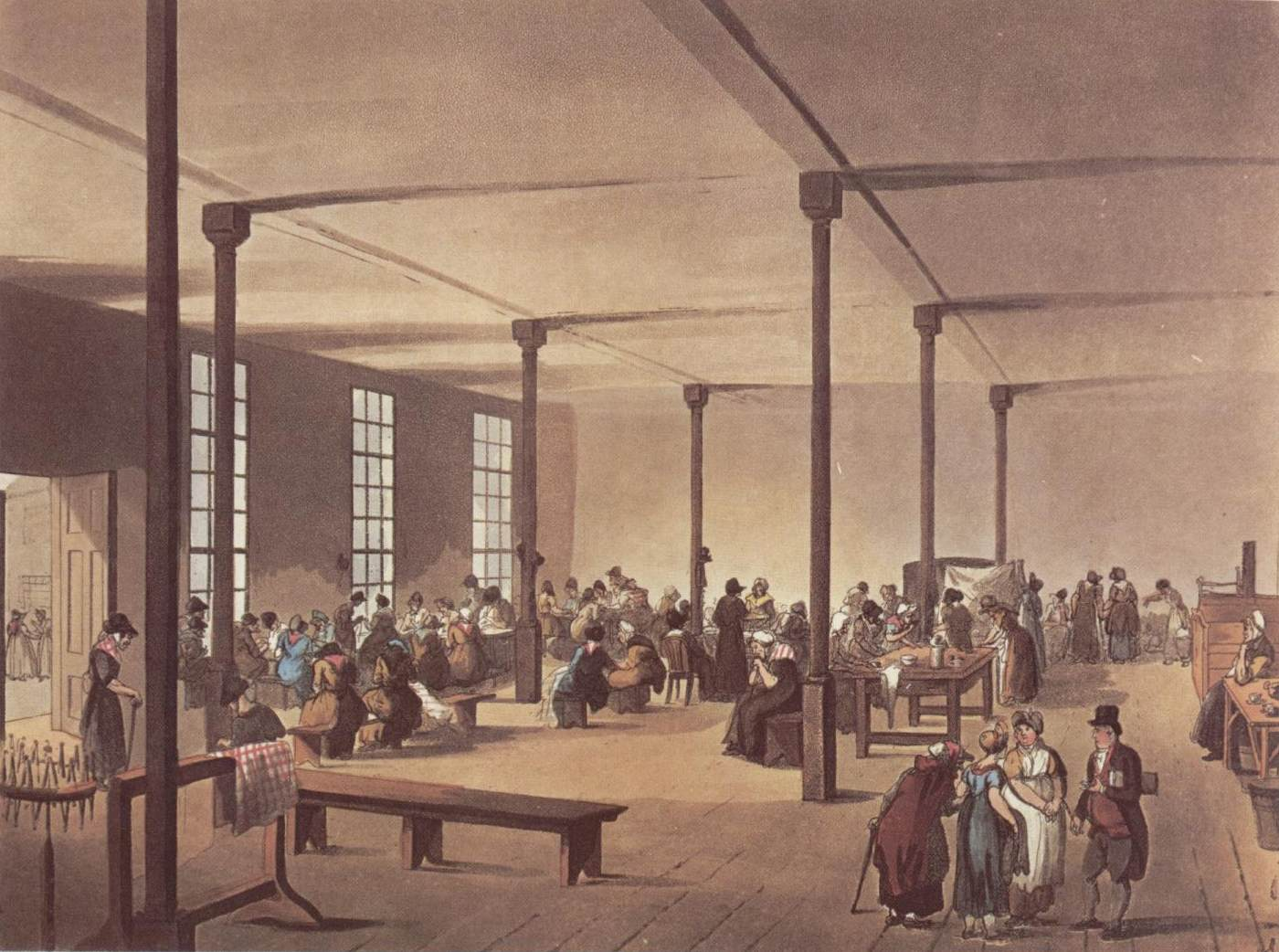
"The workroom at St James's workhouse", from The Microcosm of London, 1808
