= At Eternity's Gate =

Oil painting by Vincent van Gogh

Sorrowing Old Man ('At Eternity's Gate')
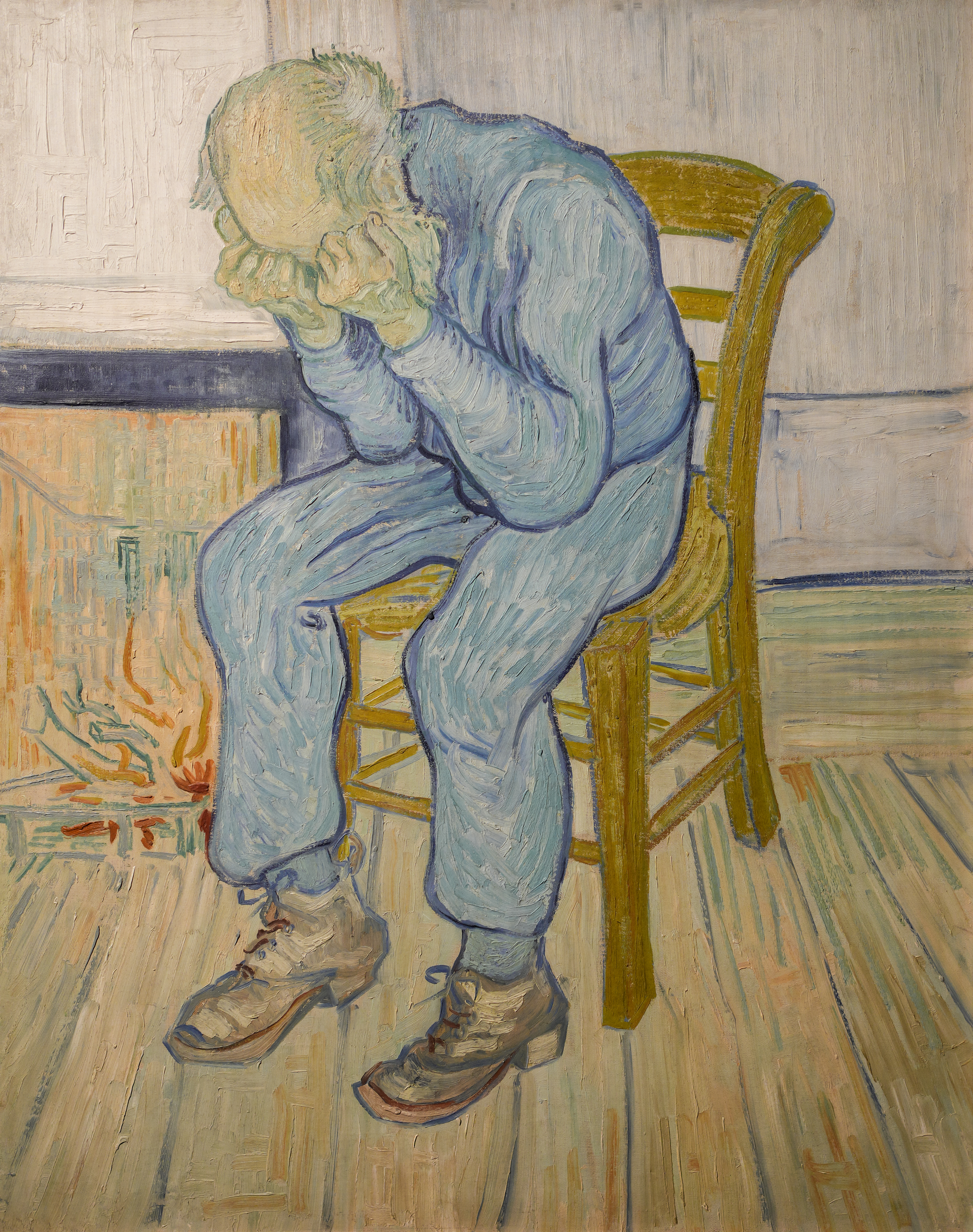
- Artist: Vincent van Gogh
- Year: May 1890
- Catalogue: F702; JH1967
- Medium: Oil on canvas
- Dimensions: 81.8 cm × 65.5 cm (32.2 in × 25.8 in)
- Location: Kröller-Müller Museum, Otterlo

Sorrowing Old Man (At Eternity's Gate) is an oil painting by Vincent van Gogh that he made in May 1890 in Saint-Rémy de Provence based on an early lithograph. The painting was completed in early May at a time when he was convalescing from a severe relapse in his health some two months before his death, which is generally accepted as a suicide.

In the 1970 catalogue raisonné, it was given the title Worn Out: At Eternity's Gate.

== Lithograph ==
The lithograph was based on a pencil drawing Worn Out, one of a series of studies he made in 1882 of a pensioner and war veteran, Adrianus Jacobus Zuyderland, at a local almshouse in The Hague and itself a reworking of a drawing and watercolour he had made the previous year. The inspiration for Worn Out was Hubert von Herkomer's Sunday at the Chelsea Hospital, an immensely popular print depicting an old war veteran slumped dead that went on to become an acclaimed painting at the Royal Academy, The Last Muster, that Van Gogh had seen in 1875 when in England. Van Gogh wrote of his drawing:

Today and yesterday I drew two figures of an old man with his elbows on his knees and his head in his hands. I did it of Schuitemaker once and always kept the drawing, because I wanted to do it better another time. Perhaps I'll also do a lithograph of it. What a fine sight an old working man makes, in his patched bombazine suit with his bald head.

Van Gogh's first attempt at the lithograph followed just two days later. He wrote:

It seems to me that a painter has a duty to try to put an idea into his work. I was trying to say this in this print—but I can't say it as beautifully, as strikingly as reality, of which this is only a dim reflection seen in a dark mirror—that it seems to me that one of the strongest pieces of evidence for the existence of 'something on high' in which Millet believed, namely in the existence of a God and an eternity, is the unutterably moving quality that there can be in the expression of an old man like that, without his being aware of it perhaps, as he sits so quietly in the corner of his hearth. At the same time something precious, something noble, that can't be meant for the worms. ... This is far from all theology—simply the fact that the poorest woodcutter, heath farmer or miner can have moments of emotion and mood that give him a sense of an eternal home that he is close to.

Later, in a rare expression of his own religious feelings, he wrote expressly about this lithograph and two other drawings also posed by Zuyderland, of an old man reading a Bible and saying grace (below) respectively:

My intention with these two and with the first old man is one and the same, namely to express the special mood of Christmas and New Year. ... Leaving aside whether or not one agrees with the form, it's something one respects if it's sincere, and for my part I can fully share in it and even feel a need for it, at least in the sense that, just as much as an old man of that kind, I have a feeling of belief in something on high even if I don't know exactly who or what will be there.

Seven impressions of the lithograph are known, of which one is annotated At Eternity's Gate. The same theme is taken up again in two later 1883 studies of a seated woman.

In 2021, a drawing in a private collection in the Netherlands since 1910 was authenticated as a preliminary study for the original pencil drawing Worn Out by the Van Gogh Museum and put on display. The Van Gogh Museum had previously been aware of the existence of the study for some time.

=== Commentary ===
Writing about At Eternity's Gate in 1998, the American theologian Kathleen Powers Erickson remarked:

Belief in a "life beyond the grave" is central to one of van Gogh's first accomplished lithographs, At Eternity's Gate ... Executed at The Hague in 1882, it depicts an old man seated by a fire, his head buried in his hands. Near the end of his life Van Gogh recreated this image in oil, while recuperating in the asylum at St. Rémy. Bent over with his fists clenched against a face hidden in utter frustration, the subject appears engulfed in grief. Certainly, the work would convey an image of total despair had it not been for the English title Van Gogh gave it, At Eternity's Gate. It demonstrates that even in his deepest moments of sorrow and pain, Van Gogh clung to a faith in God and eternity, which he tried to express in his work. ...

== Genesis ==
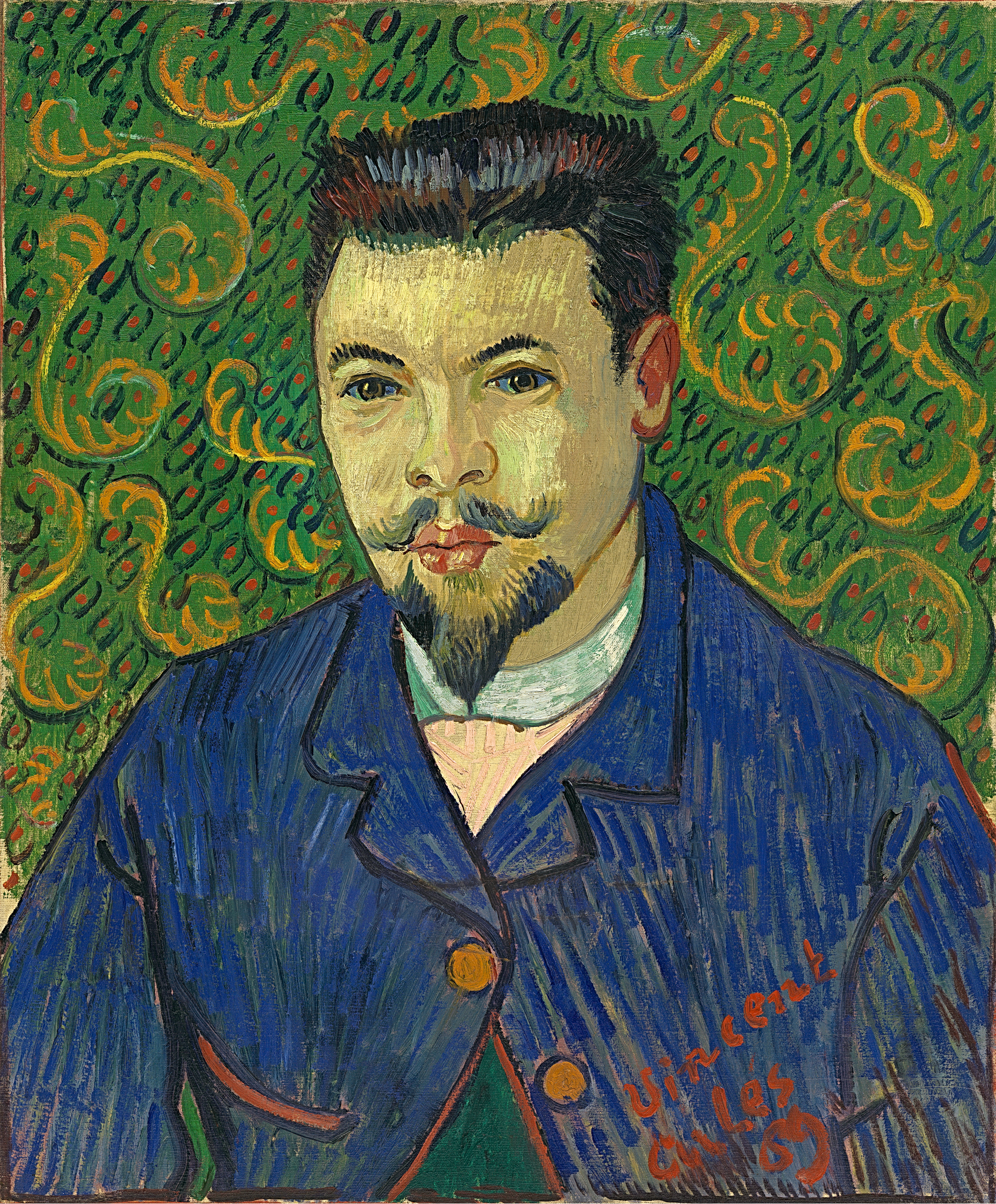
Portrait of Doctor Félix Rey (F500, JH1659), oil on canvas 1889, Pushkin Museum. Rey disliked his portrait and gave it away.

Vincent van Gogh suffered from some form of mental illness, acutely during the last two years of his life. The official diagnosis furnished by the hospital in Arles that Van Gogh was taken to on 24 December 1888, following the celebrated incident involving his ear, was "acute mania with generalised delirium". Dr. Félix Rey, a young intern at the hospital, also suggested "a kind of epilepsy" he characterised as mental epilepsy.

There is no agreement today over a modern diagnosis of Van Gogh's illness. Suggestions include epilepsy and bipolar disorder, possibly exacerbated by excessive absinthe drinking, heavy smoking and venereal disease. Symptoms were varied, but in their most severe manifestations they involved attacks of confusion and unconsciousness followed by periods of stupor and incoherence during which he was generally unable to paint, draw, or even to write letters. It was such an attack that first led him to being hospitalised at Arles, and following a later relapse, he had himself committed to the asylum at Saint-Rémy in May 1889, where he remained for the most part until May 1890.

On 22 February 1890, Van Gogh suffered his most severe relapse, an episode Jan Hulsker called the longest and saddest of his life, and one which lasted some nine weeks through to late April. During this time, he was only able to write to his brother Theo once, in March 1890, and then only briefly to say he was totally stupefied (totalement abruti) and unable to write. He did not write to Theo again until late April, but that letter makes it clear that he had been able to paint and draw a little during this time, despite his sadness and melancholy:

What can I tell you of these two last months, things aren't going well at all, I'm more sad and bored than I could tell you, and I no longer know what point I'm at ... While I was ill I nevertheless still did a few small canvases from memory which you'll see later, memories from the north [souvenirs du nord] ... so melancholy do I feel.

It is in these drawings and paintings that Hulsker sees unmistakable signs of his mental collapse, otherwise rare in his work.

It is not clear whether Sorrowing Old Man ('At Eternity's Gate') is one of the canvases referred to in his April letter. Hulsker remarks that it would have been remarkable for Van Gogh to have copied his lithograph so faithfully from memory. Nevertheless, the painting is clearly a return to the past, and both the 1970 catalogue raisonné and Hulsker cite the painting as fecit May 1890 at Saint-Rémy.

== From the 1880s ==
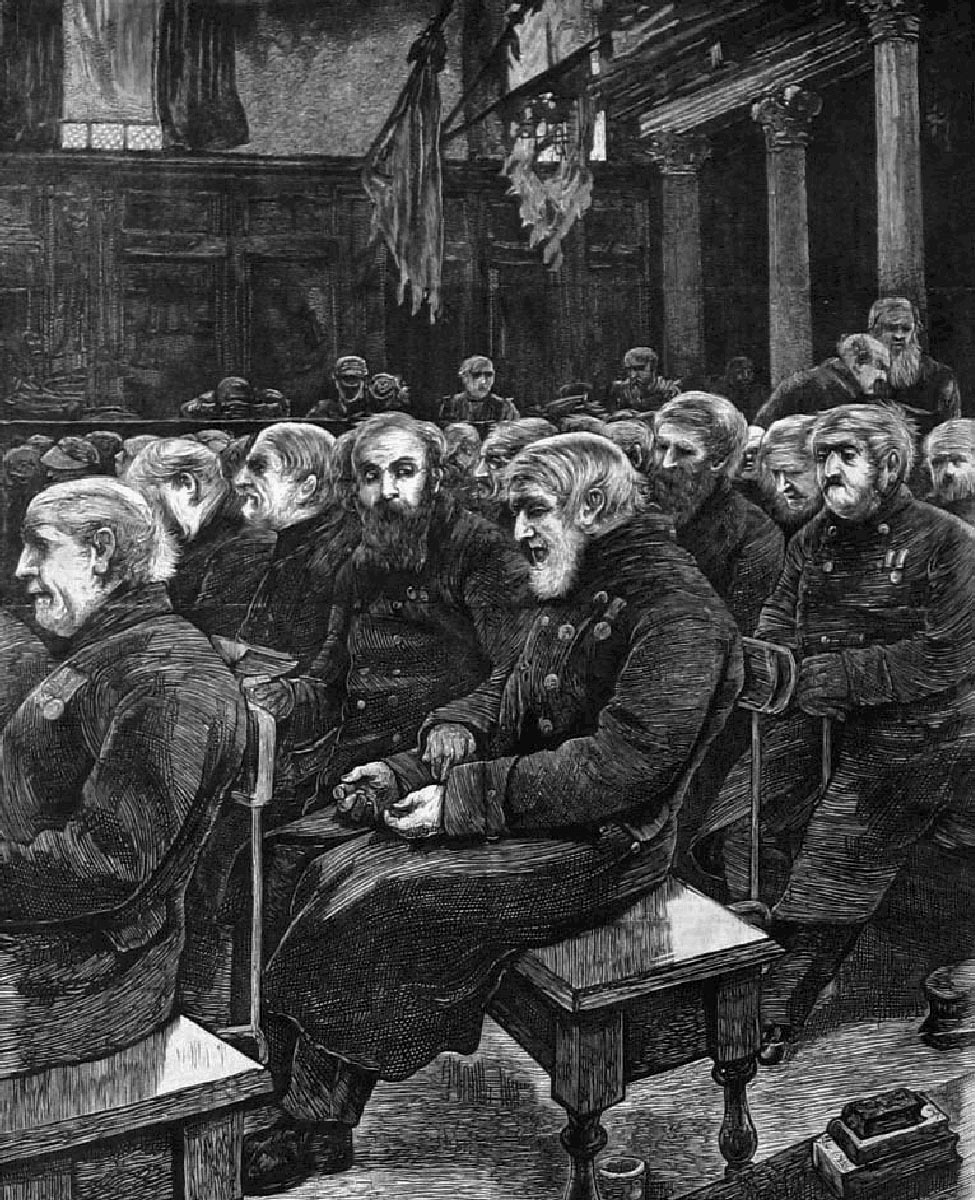
Hubert von Herkomer - Sunday at the Chelsea Hospital (1871), also known as The Last Muster

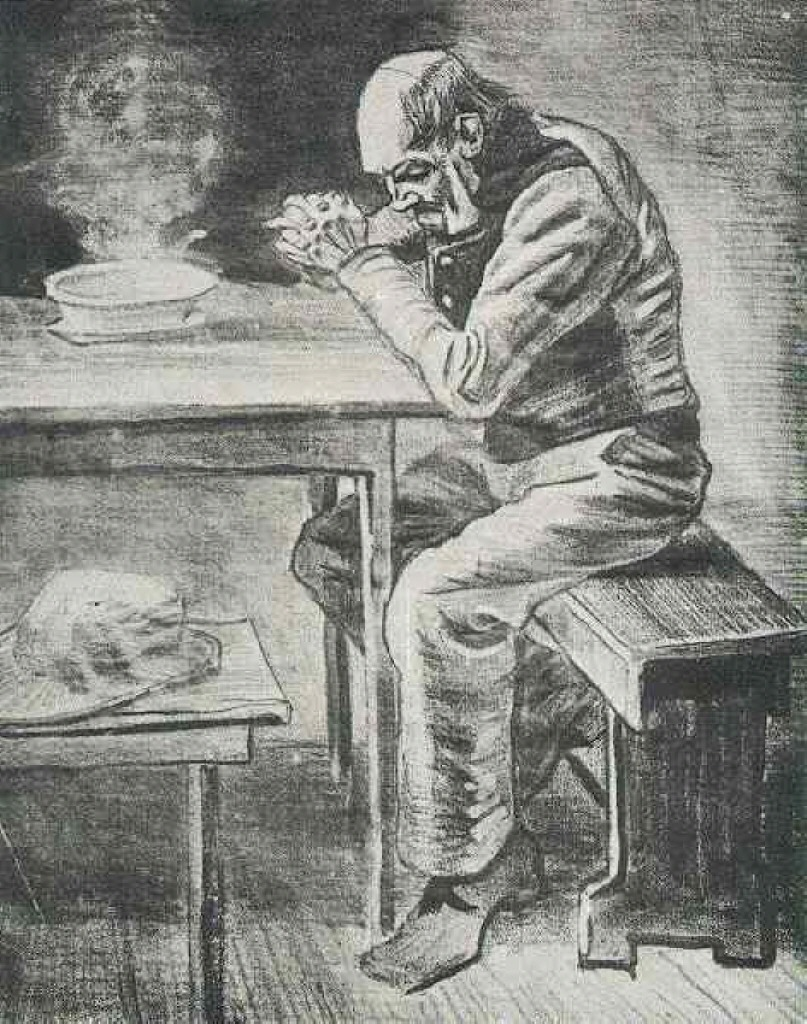
Prayer Before the Meal, pencil, black chalk, ink, heightened with white, December 1882, Private collection, Switzerland (F 1002, JH 281).

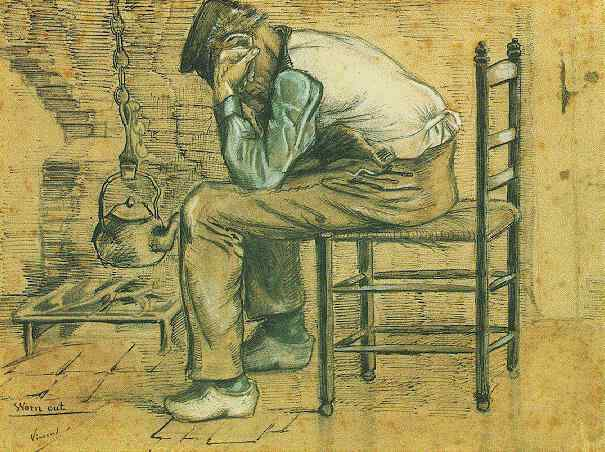
Peasant Sitting by the Fireplace ('Worn Out'), (F863, JH34), watercolor, 1881, P. and N. de Boer Foundation, Amsterdam

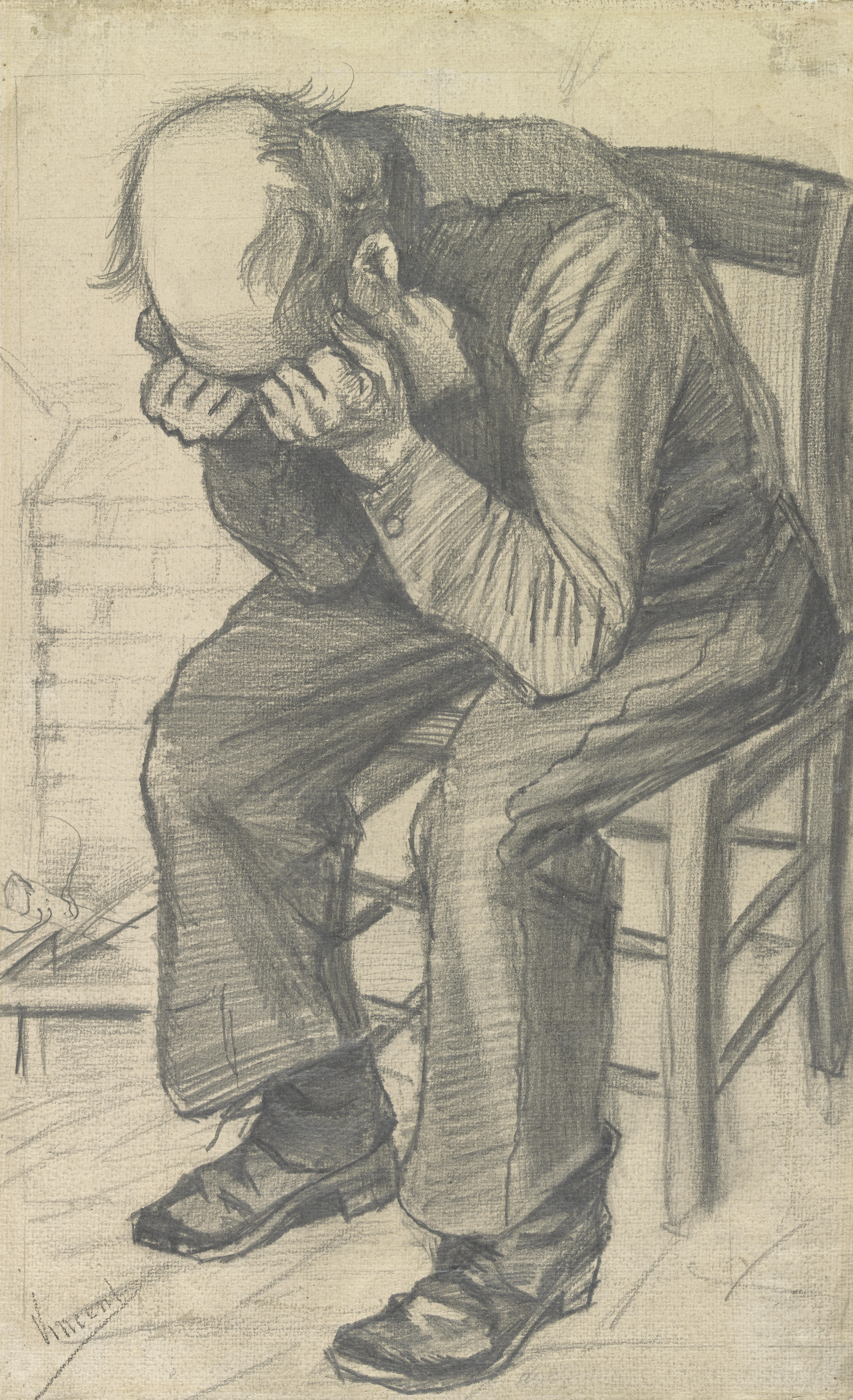
Worn Out (F997, JH267), pencil on watercolor paper, 1882, Van Gogh Museum

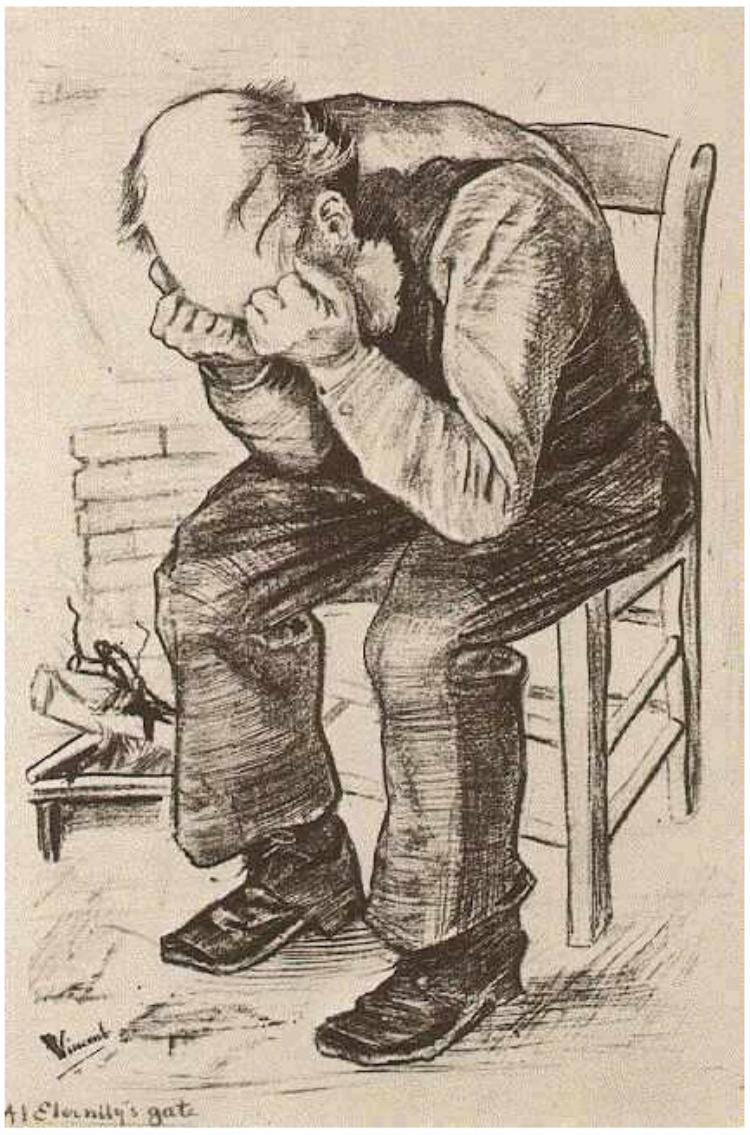
Old Man with his Head in his Hands ("At Eternity's Gate") (F1662, JH268), lithograph, 1882, various collections, including Tehran Museum of Contemporary Art, whose version illustrated is annotated by the artist in ink at lower left: At Eternity's Gate

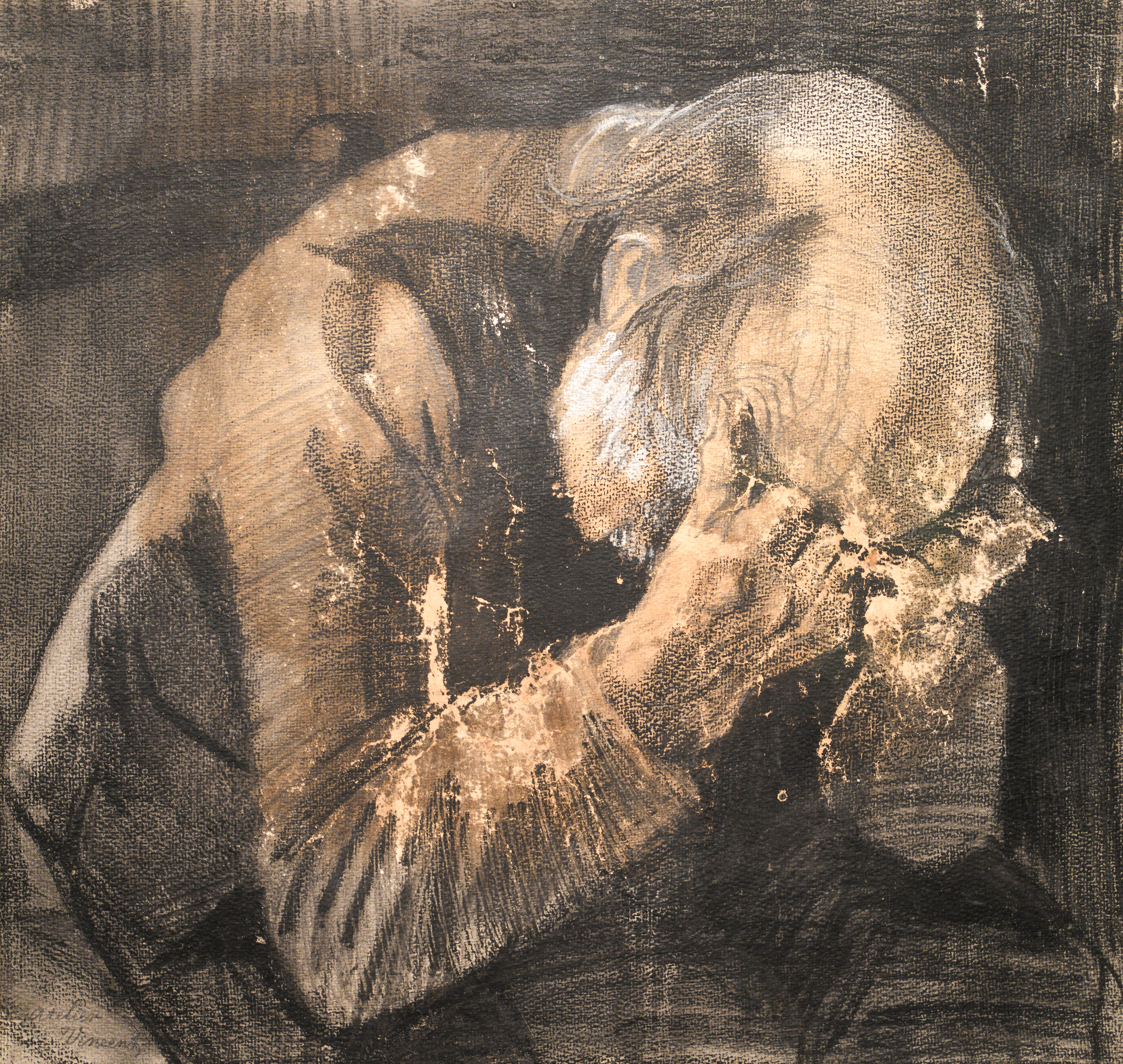
Sorrowful old man (F998, JH269) pencil, black lithographic crayon, wash, white opaque watercolour, on watercolour paper, 1882, Kröller-Müller Museum

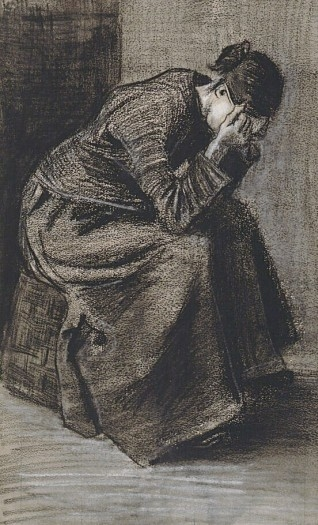
Mourning Woman Seated on a Basket (F1060, JH326), black lithographic crayon, grey wash, white and grey opaque watercolour, traces of squaring, on watercolour paper, 1883, Kröller-Müller Museum

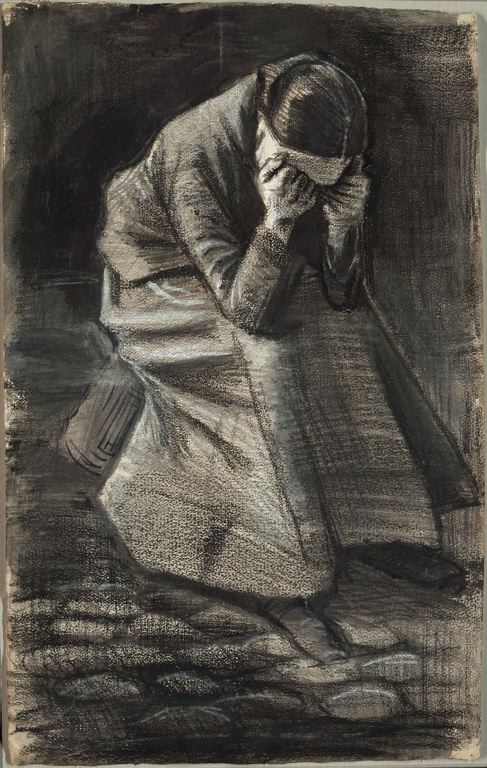
Weeping Woman (F1069, JH325), Black and white chalk, with brush and stumping, brush and black and grey wash, and traces of graphite, over a brush and brown ink underdrawing on ivory wove paper, 1883, Art Institute of Chicago.

== See also ==
- List of works by Vincent van Gogh

== Bibliography ==
- Erickson, Kathleen Powers. At Eternity's Gate: The Spiritual Vision of Vincent Van Gogh. William B. Eerdmans Publishing Co., 1998. ISBN 978-0-8028-3856-8
- de la Faille, Jacob-Baart. The Works of Vincent Van Gogh: His Paintings and Drawings. Amsterdam: Meulenhoff, 1970. ISBN 978-1-55660-811-7
- Hulsker, Jan. The Complete Van Gogh. Oxford: Phaidon, 1980. ISBN 0-7148-2028-8
- Naifeh, Steven; Smith, Gregory White. Van Gogh: The Life. Profile Books, 2011. ISBN 978-1-84668-010-6
- Pomerans, Arnold. The Letters of Vincent van Gogh. Penguin Classics, 2003. ISBN 978-0-14-044674-6
