= The Goose Girl (Bouguereau) =

Painting by William-Adolphe Bouguereau

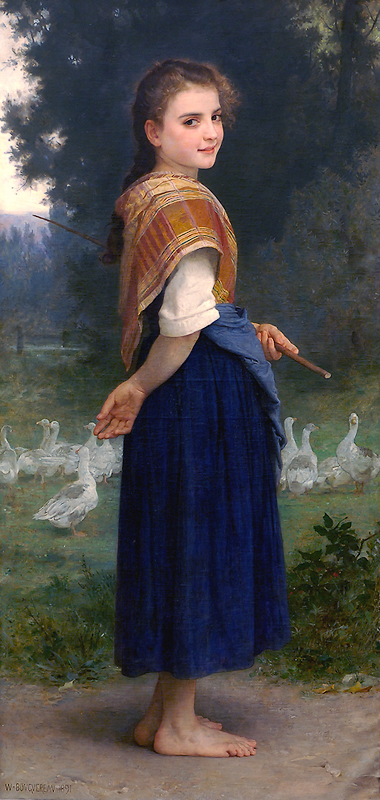
- Artist: William-Adolphe Bouguereau
- Year: 1891
- Medium: Oil on canvas
- Dimensions: 152 cm × 74 cm (60 in × 29 in)
- Location: Johnson Museum of Art, Ithaca

The Goose Girl is an 1891 painting by William-Adolphe Bouguereau, a French academic painter. The Goose Girl is one of many examples that Bouguereau specialized in paintings of beautiful women and innocent, barefoot, young peasant girls.

It is part of the permanent collection of the Herbert F. Johnson Museum of Art at Cornell University.

== Description ==
The life-size character in the foreground (on a frame measuring 152 × 74 cm) is that of a young girl represented full-length, turned to the right, her face oriented towards the viewer, slightly bent and smiling. She wears a blue skirt, a shawl on the shoulders placed on a white shirt with short or rolled up sleeves. Barefoot on a dirt road, she imposes herself on a flock of geese visible on both sides in the background against a background of green foliage, a wand in her hand, thereby indicating her function as a guard.
