= Le Travail interrompu =

1891 painting by William-Adolphe Bouguereau

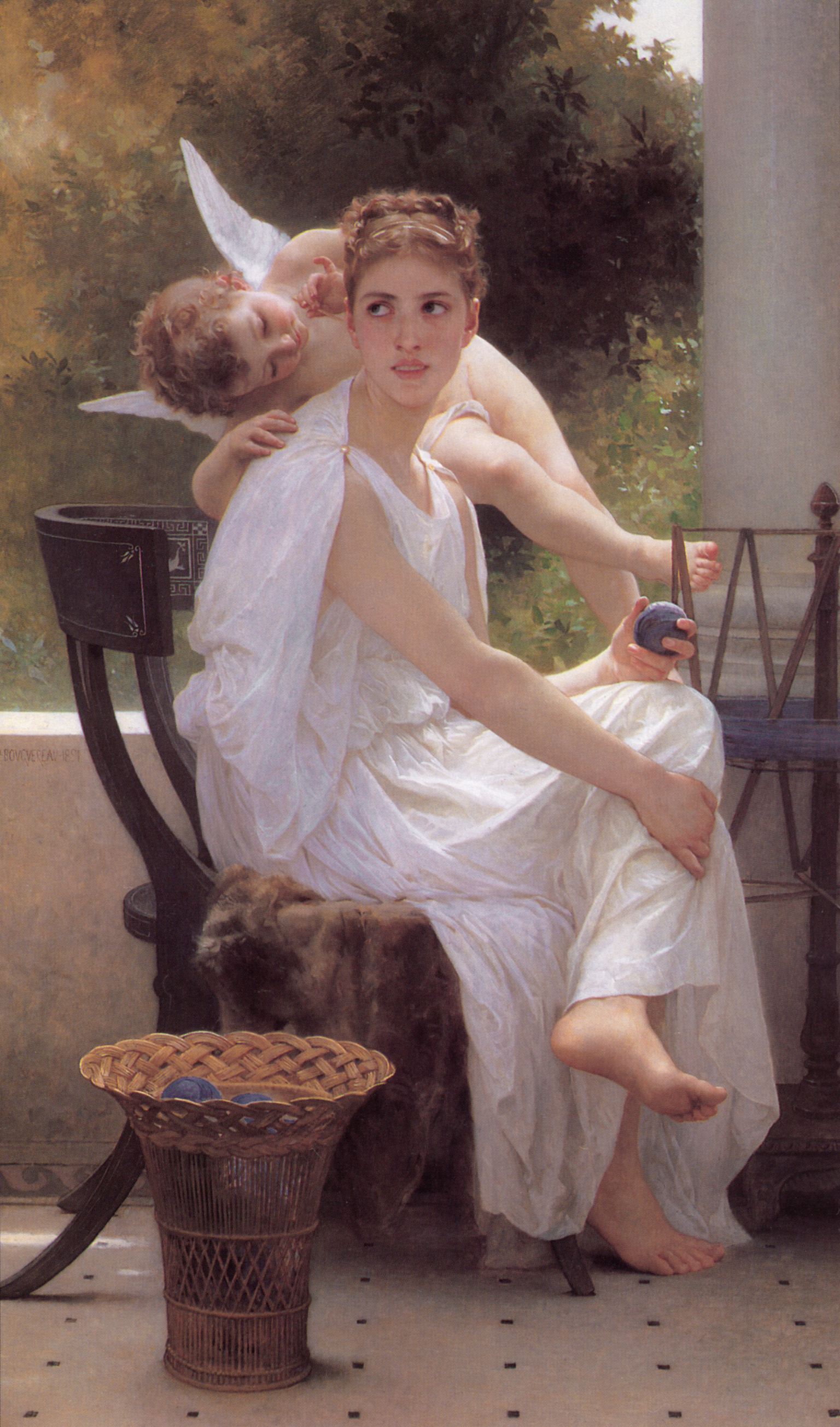
- Le Travail interrompu (1891)
- Artist: William-Adolphe Bouguereau
- Year: 1891
- Medium: Oil on canvas
- Dimensions: 160 cm × 99.7 cm (63 in × 39.3 in)
- Location: Mead Art Museum; Amherst, Massachusetts, U.S.A.

Le Travail interrompu (English: Work Interrupted) is a painting by nineteenth-century French painter William-Adolphe Bouguereau in 1891. The painting is currently held in the Mead Art Museum in Amherst, Massachusetts.

The painting shows a woman seated beside an urn filled with balls of wool; Cupid is leaning across her shoulders applying perfume to her ear. The delicate luminous colours combined with the barely visible brush strokes are typical of the artist's work.

== See also ==
- William-Adolphe Bouguereau gallery
