= On Strike (painting) =

Painting by Hubert von Herkomer

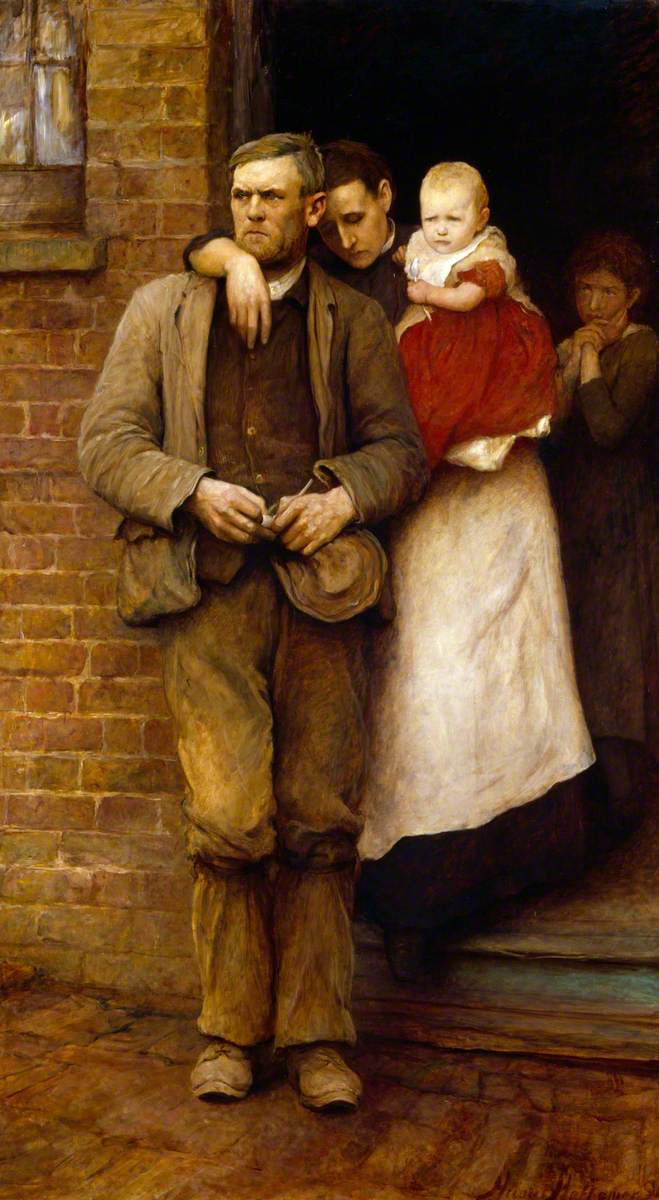
- Artist: Hubert von Herkomer
- Year: 1891
- Type: Oil on canvas, genre painting
- Dimensions: 228 cm × 126.4 cm (90 in × 49.8 in)
- Location: Royal Academy of Arts, London

On Strike is an 1891 oil painting by the German-British artist Hubert von Herkomer. It depicts a family standing at their door during a strike. It came at a time of increased labour unrest in the later Victorian era as employees went on strike for improved pay and working conditions. A review in The Illustrated London News believed it was inspired by the 1889 London dock strike.

Hubert von Herkomer made his name as a producer of Social realist art. When he was elected to full membership of the Royal Academy of Arts he was required to submit a diploma work and presented this.The picture was displayed at the Royal Academy Exhibition of 1891 held at Burlington House in London. It remains in the collection of the Royal Academy.

== Bibliography ==
- Edwards, Lee M. Herkomer: A Victorian Artist. Ashgate, 1999.
- O'Mahony, Claire I. R. Brunel and the Art of Invention. Sansom & Company, 2007.
