= Perseus and Andromeda (Leighton) =

Painting by Frederic Leighton

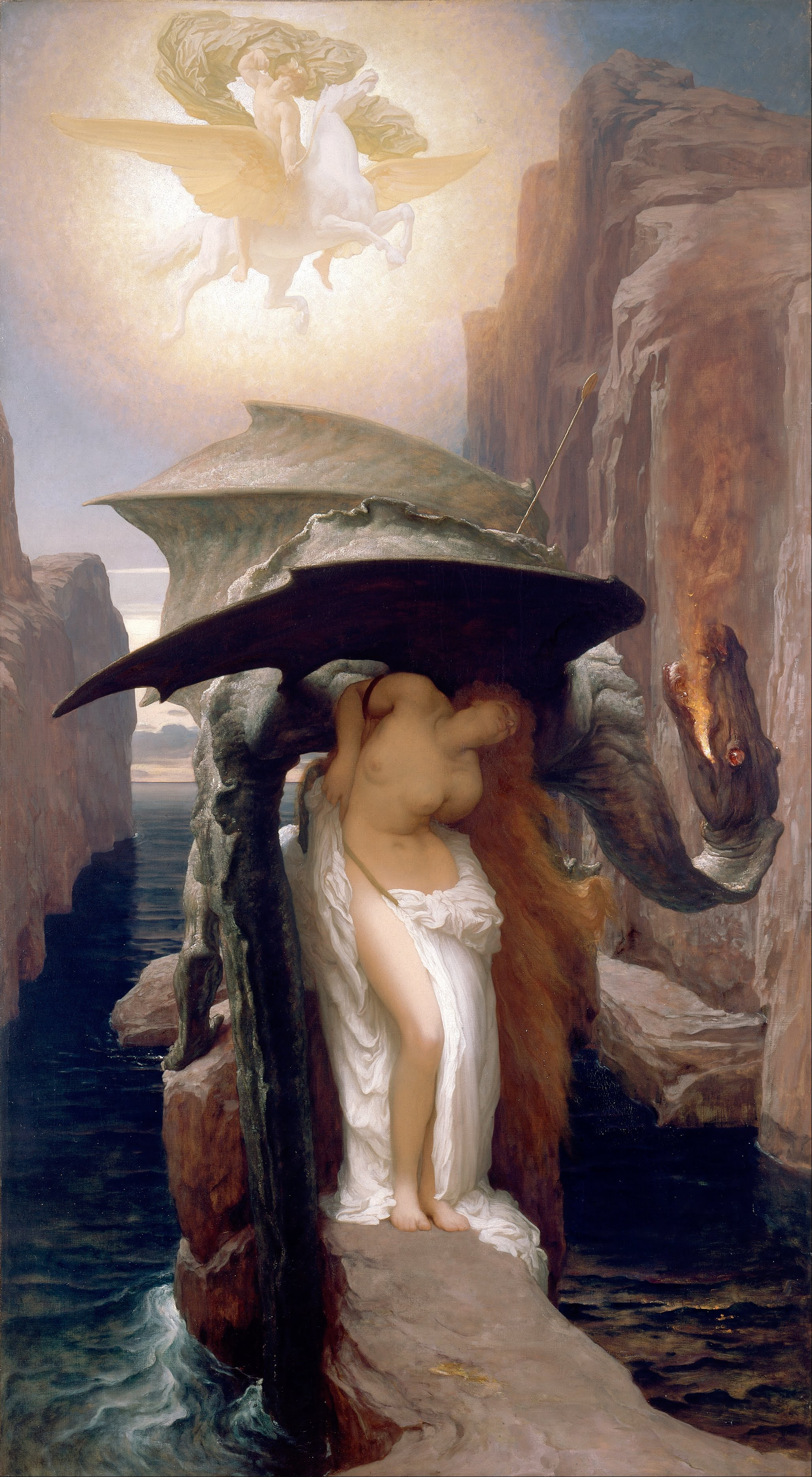
- Artist: Frederic Leighton
- Year: 1891
- Medium: Oil on canvas
- Dimensions: 235 cm × 129.2 cm (93 in × 50.9 in)
- Location: Walker Art Gallery; Liverpool, UK

Perseus and Andromeda is an oil painting by Lord Frederic Leighton. Completed in 1891, the year it was displayed at the Royal Academy of Arts, it depicts the Greek mythological story of Andromeda. In contrast to the basis of a classical tale, Leighton used a Gothic style for the artwork. The painting is in the collection of National Museums Liverpool at the Walker Art Gallery.

== Legend ==
In Greek mythology, the kingdom of Ethiopia was ruled by the beautiful but vain queen, Cassiopeia, who claimed that her beauty was superior to that of the sea nymphs. When the nymphs, who were the daughters of Poseidon, the god of the sea, became aware of her claims, they protested to their father. Poseidon retaliated by calling up a sea monster called Cetus to patrol and wreak havoc along the coastline of Ethiopia, placing Cassiope's kingdom at risk. Queen Cassiopeia, together with her husband Cepheus, decided to sacrifice their daughter, Princess Andromeda, to the monster.

Andromeda was chained to a rock at the edge of the sea as an offering to the monster. Perseus, who had just fought and defeated Medusa, was travelling back home on his winged horse, Pegasus. He rescued Andromeda by killing the monster. The couple fell in love, but the Princess was already betrothed to Phineus. Perseus and Phineus argued at the wedding, but Perseus held up the head of the defeated Medusa and Phineus was turned to stone.

== Painting ==
The mythological theme of Andromeda is depicted in a dramatic manner. The scene is a representation of the myth set on a rocky shore. Perseus is depicted flying above the head of Andromeda, on his winged horse Pegasus. He is shooting an arrow from the air, that hits the sea monster, who turns his head upwards, towards the hero. Andromeda's almost naked, twisted body is shaded by the wings of the dark creature, creating a visual sign of imminent danger. Andromeda's sinuous body is contrasted against the dark masses of the monster's irregular and jagged body. The white body of Andromeda is depicted in pure and untouched innocence, indicating an unfair sacrifice for a divine punishment that was not directed towards her, but her mother. Pegasus and Perseus are surrounded by a halo of light that connects them visually to the white body of the princess, chained to the rock.

Leighton cast a small bronze painted plaster sculpture of Andromeda as a study before commencing work on the painting. The statuette was naked but Leighton placed wet materials over it to achieve the effect he wanted to reproduce in his work. A later artwork, Perseus on Pegasus Hastening to the Rescue of Andromeda, completed four years later, portrayed the same story.
