= The Last Muster =

1875 painting by Hubert von Herkomer

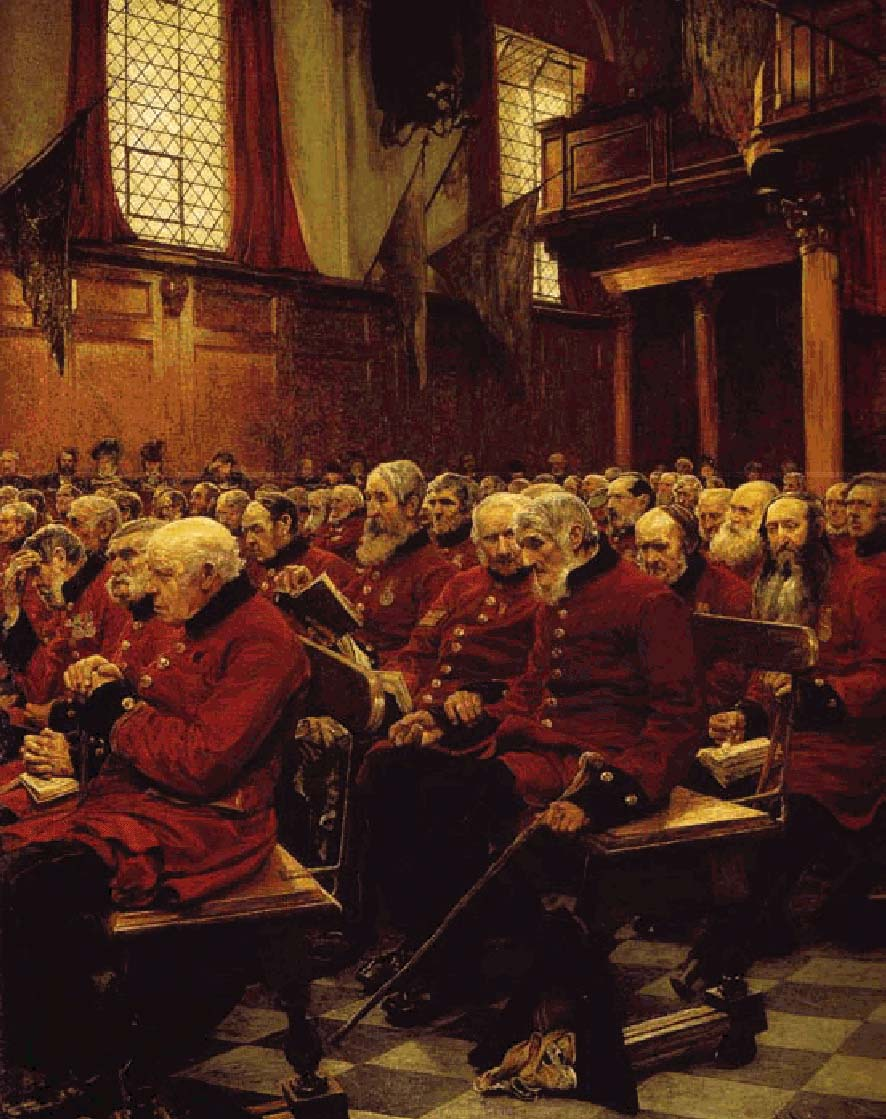
Hubert von Herkomer, 1875, The Last Muster

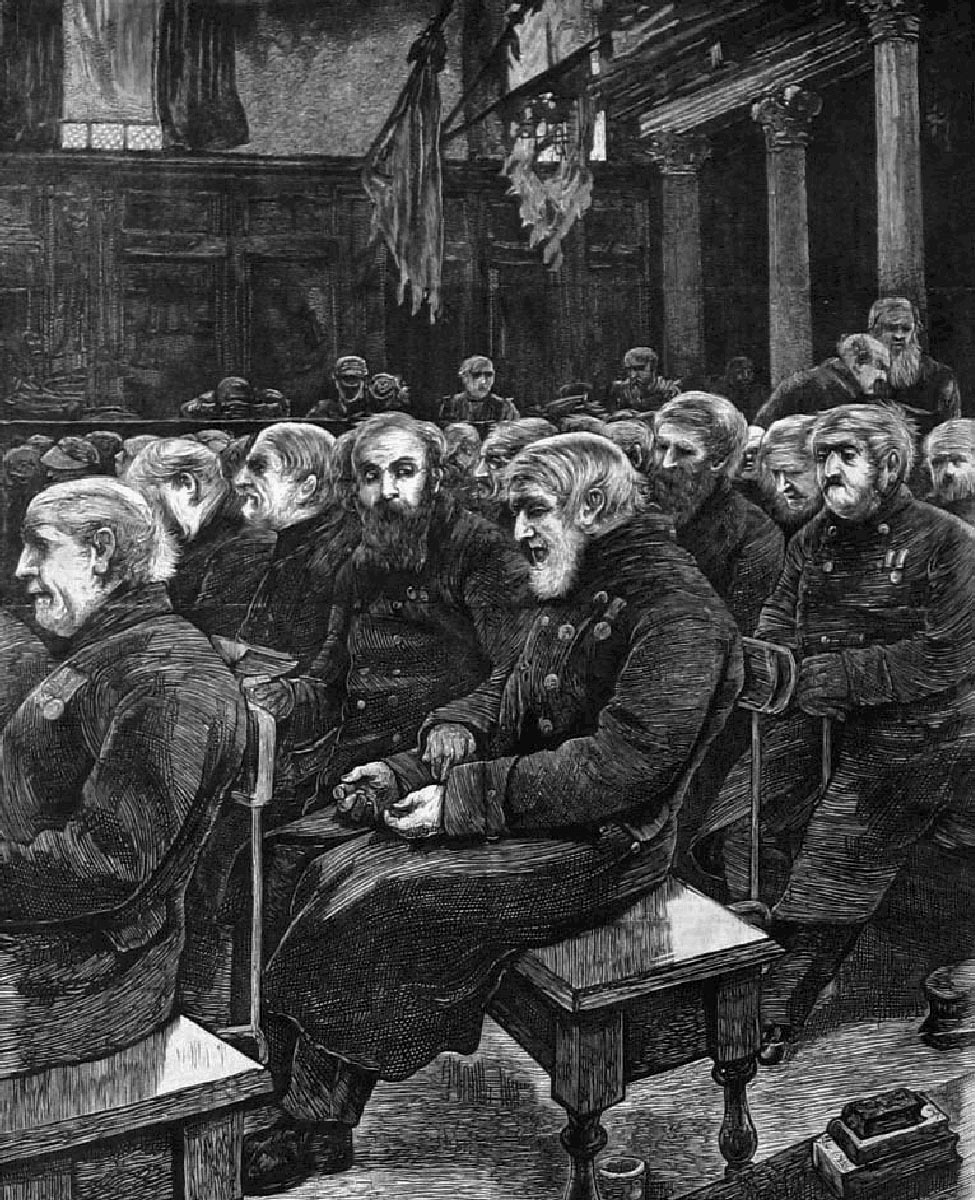
Hubert von Herkomer, 1875, Sunday at the Chelsea Hospital

The Last Muster is an 1875 oil painting by Sir Hubert von Herkomer, based on his wood engraving Sunday at the Chelsea Hospital published in The Graphic on 18 February 1871. The painting is in the Lady Lever Art Gallery, in Port Sunlight, Wirral Peninsula.

== Description ==
The work depicts a congregation of Chelsea Pensioners at a Sunday morning service in the chapel of the Royal Hospital Chelsea. The aged pensioner at the near end of the second row has died; his neighbour is holding his wrist, checking in vain for a pulse. The painting measures 214.5 by 159 centimetres (84.4 in × 62.6 in).

Several of the figures in the painting are based on sketches of inmates at the hospital, made by Herkomer directly on the canvas. Others are based on his friends or family. The figure with white beard in the third row is based on Herkomer's father. In the background are Herkomer's wife Anna, and also his patron the photographer Clarence Edmund Fry and members of Fry's family.

== Reception ==
The painting was exhibited at the Royal Academy summer exhibition in 1875. It was a critical and popular success, and a barrier was erected to protect it from the thronging crowd, the fourth time the rare honour had been accorded in four years: it was needed in 1874 for Luke Fildes's Applicants for Admission to a Casual Ward and Lady Butler's The Roll Call, and in 1871 for William Powell Frith's The Salon d'Or, Homburg. Previous examples include Frith's The Derby Day in 1858 and David Wilkie's Chelsea Pensioners reading the Waterloo Dispatch in 1822.

Among those who admired the painting was Vincent van Gogh, who collected several prints by Herkomer while he was living in London from 1873 to 1875. The Last Muster inspired Van Gogh's 1882 pencil drawing Worn Out and his 1890 painting At Eternity's Gate.

Herkomer's painting was bought for £1,200 by Clarence Edmund Fry, and exhibited at the business premises of Elliott & Fry on Baker Street, where the paintings were displayed alongside their photographs to demonstrate their artistic merit.

The work made Herkomer internationally famous. It won a gold Medaille d'Honneur at the Exposition Universelle in Paris in 1878: the only other English painter similarly recognised at the exhibition was John Everett Millais. After Herkomer won the gold medal in Paris, Arthur Turrell made a mezzotint after the painting for Pilgeram and Lefèvre. Copyright was registered in the US by Knoedler in 1878. Herkomer was made a chevalier of the légion d'honneur in 1879, ennobled by King Otto of Bavaria in 1899 (adding "von" to his name), and knighted in England in 1907.

The painting sold to the stockbroker and accountant William Cuthbert Quilter in 1881, and it was then exhibited at the Munich International Exposition in 1883, at the Whitechapel Fine Art Exhibition in 1885, at the Royal Jubilee Exhibition in Manchester in 1887, and at the World's Columbian Exposition in Chicago in 1893. It was sold at auction in 1909 for £3,000, and bought at Christie's in 1923 by William Lever, 1st Viscount Leverhulme for the newly-opened Lady Lever Art Gallery in Port Sunlight, where it remains.
