= Hubert von Herkomer =

British artist (1849–1914)

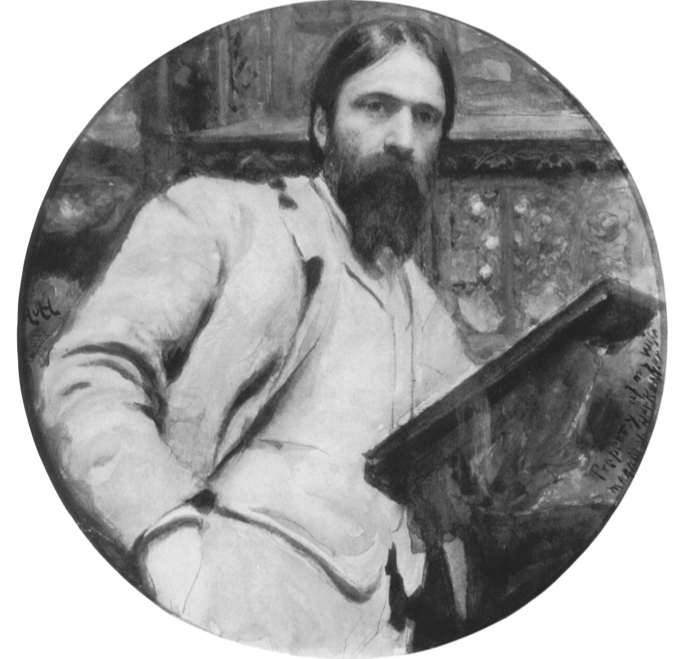
Self-portrait c. 1880

Sir Hubert von Herkomer CVO RA (born as Hubert Herkomer; 26 May 1849 – 31 March 1914) was a Bavarian-born British painter, pioneering film-director, and composer. Though a very successful portrait artist, especially of men, he is mainly remembered for his earlier works that took a realistic approach to the conditions of life of the poor. Hard Times (1885; Manchester Art Gallery) showing the distraught family of a travelling day-labourer at the side of a road, is one of his best-known works.

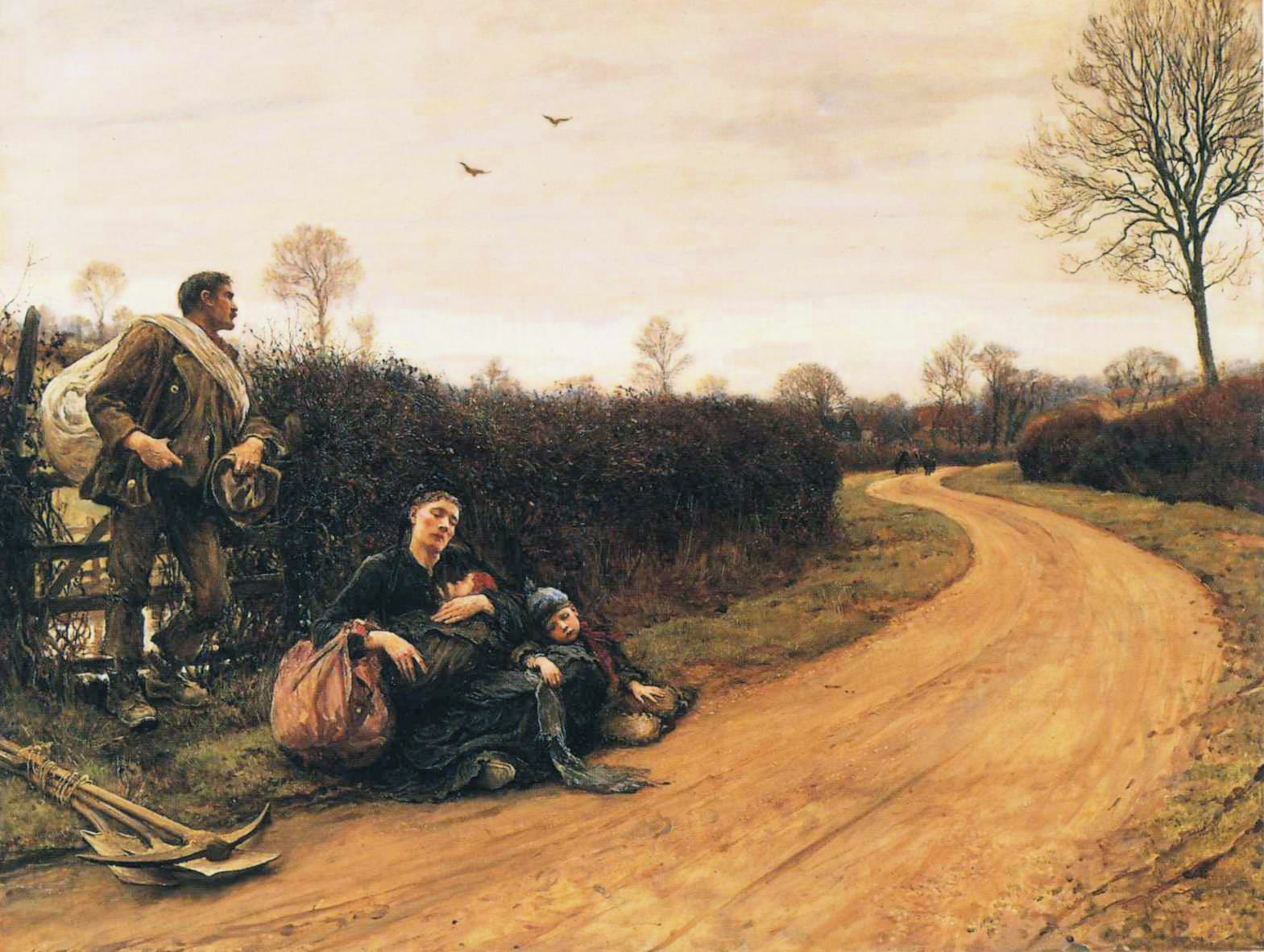
Hard Times, 1885, Manchester Art Gallery

== Early life and education ==
Herkomer was born on 26 May 1849 at Waal, in the Kingdom of Bavaria, the son of Lorenz Herkomer (1825–1888), a wood-carver of great ability, and his wife Josephine Herkomer, née Niggl (1826–1879). His family was poor, and his mother tried to supplement his father's earnings by giving music lessons. Once his mother gave him a half sovereign for some shopping: "It was the last piece of gold in the place. I lost it. My parents were in despair."

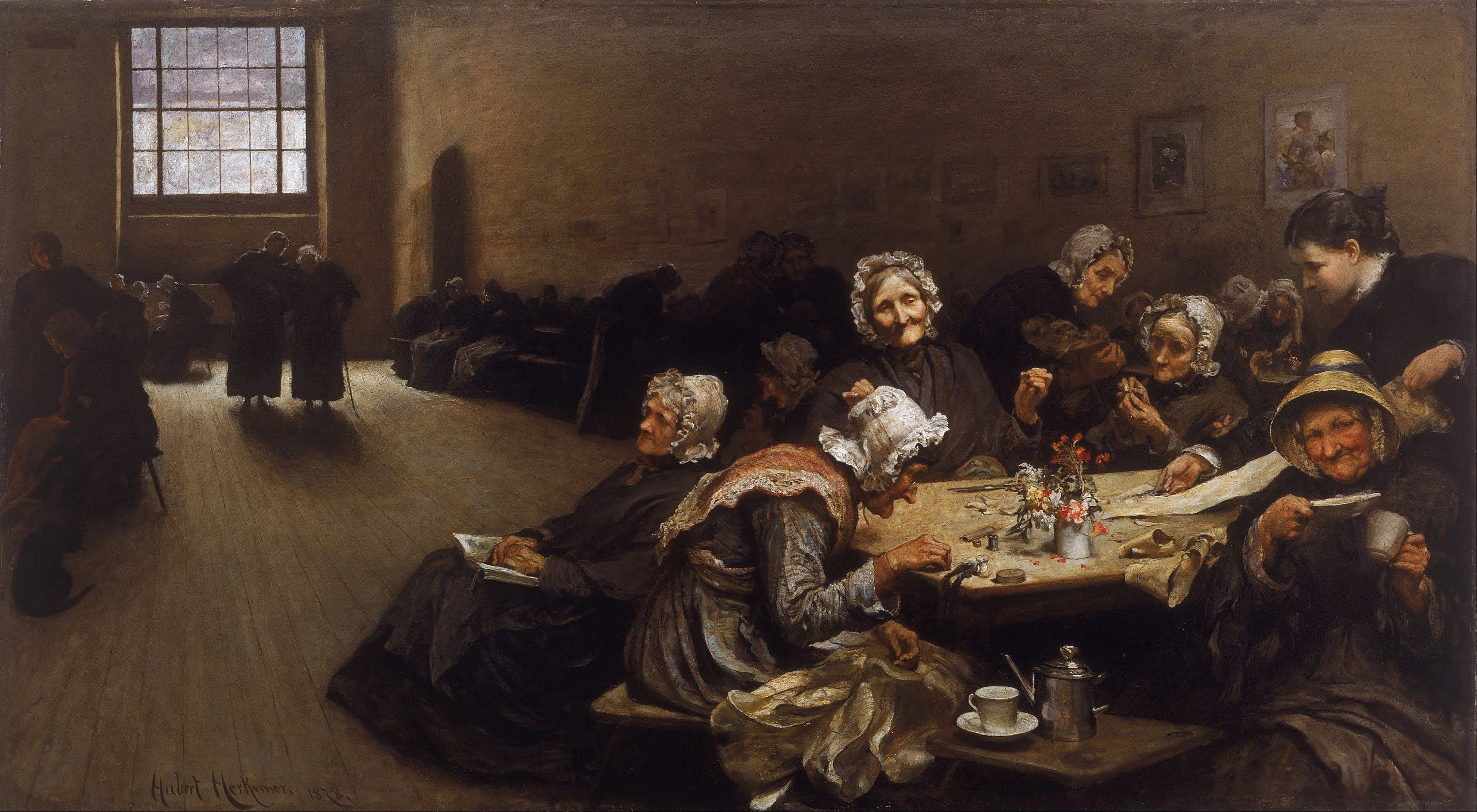
Eventide: A Scene in the Westminster Union, 1878, Walker Art Gallery, Liverpool

Lorenz Herkomer left Bavaria in 1851 with his wife and child for the United States, settling in Cleveland, Ohio. They soon returned to Europe and in 1857 settled in Southampton at 10, Windsor Terrace, where the family spent seventeen years before moving to Watford. Hubert's education was slight: "He went to school for a month or two, and, falling ill never returned." In 1861, Herkomer's father was recorded at that address as an artist aged 47 and his mother as a 39-year-old teacher of music. In a lengthy interview for the boys' annual Chums in 1896, Herkomer recalled his childhood: "We had an anxious time of it when I was a boy. We were constantly in want of money..... I was always inclined to art, and as a little boy worked principally at my father's bench, but by the time I had turned twelve I had produced quite a number of water-colour drawings. The reputation I gained among my play fellows, however, was as a maker of kites". He also crafted mechanical toys including clowns and wagons to give to his friends.

While in Southampton, Herkomer went to the school of art there and began his formal art training. An uncle in the United States commissioned his father to carve the Four Evangelists in wood. Receiving some money, his father determined to take Hubert to Munich, so that he could study art there while his father worked on the carvings. In his Chums interview thirty years later, Herkomer recalled the trip vividly: "Ah, how I remember that first visit to Germany! ... We crossed to Antwerp in a cattle boat ... And never shall I forget the miseries of that voyage. And then there were the railway carriages on the other side. We were compelled to travel fourth-class, in the company of people who were no less filthy than the carriages; and I remember..... I swore a big oath that if ever I had any money I would travel in the most luxurious style possible. I have never forgotten that oath." Herkomer and his father led a hard life while in Munich, but he stated that "they were very happy days" and his father sat as model for him during that time.

In 1866, Herkomer began a more serious course of study at the South Kensington Schools.

== Career ==
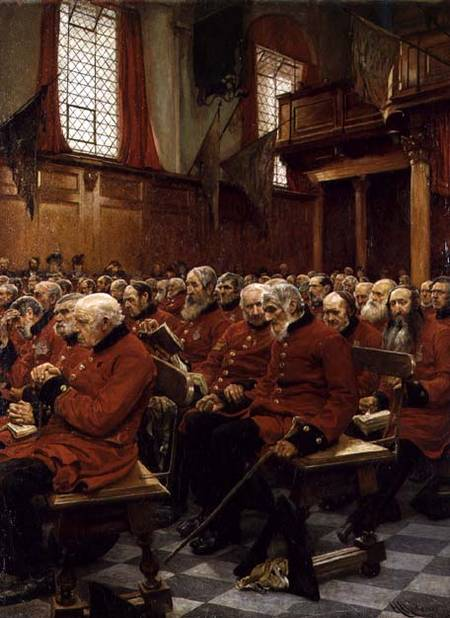
The Last Muster, 1875

In 1869 Herkomer exhibited for the first time at the Royal Academy of Arts and sold his first picture for two guineas. Also in 1869, he began working as an illustrator for the newly founded newspaper The Graphic, a rival of the Illustrated London News.

After a wood-engraving dated 1871, he established his position as an artist of high distinction at the Royal Academy. Another early notable work is his Eventide: A Scene in the Westminster Union (1878).

On 10 January 1872, Herkomer was naturalized as a British subject. Then aged 22 and living at 32, Smith Street, Chelsea, he was described as an unmarried artist. His oath of allegiance to Queen Victoria was witnessed by Sir Sills John Gibbons, Lord Mayor of London.

In 1873, Herkomer visited a friend who lived in Bushey, Hertfordshire, and the next year he rented a pair of cottages there called Dyreham and a studio near Melbourne Road, Bushey. By the time he was twenty-four, he had sold a painting for £1,200 pounds to CE Fry, an oil painting titled The Last Muster (1875). In 1879 he was elected an associate of the Royal Academy.

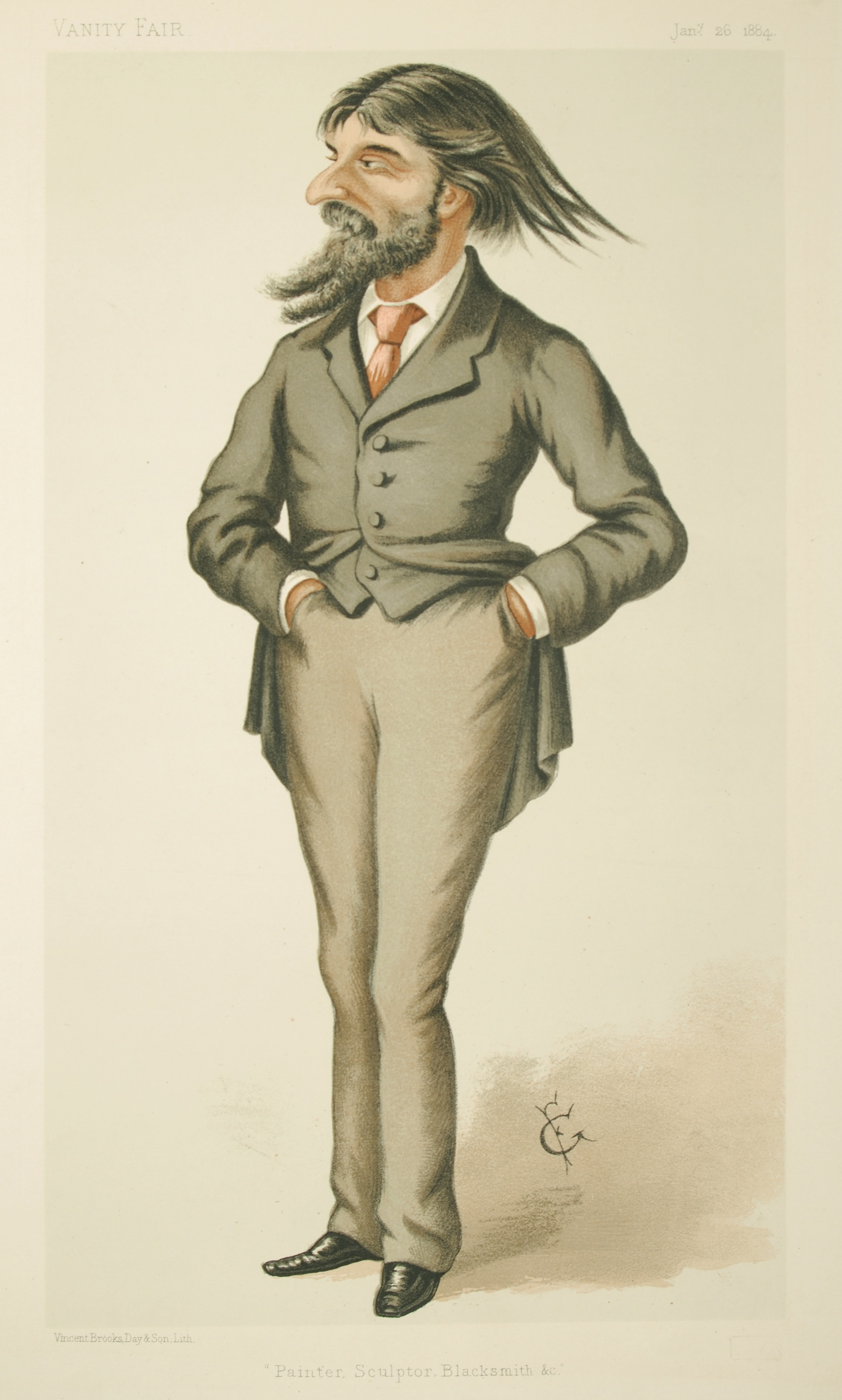
Herkomer as caricatured by FG, 1884

In 1884, a full-page caricature of Herkomer by FG (his friend Franz Goedecker) appeared in Vanity Fair, captioned "Painter, Sculptor, Blacksmith &c". In the same year, he established an Art School at Bushey which he continued until 1904, attracting many students. In 1885 Herkomer succeeded Ruskin and was appointed Slade Professor of Fine Art at the University of Oxford, a position he held until 1894. He was the first president of the Oxford Art Society, established in 1891.

In 1890 Herkomer was elected a Royal Academician, in 1893 an associate of the Royal Watercolour Society, and the next year a full member.

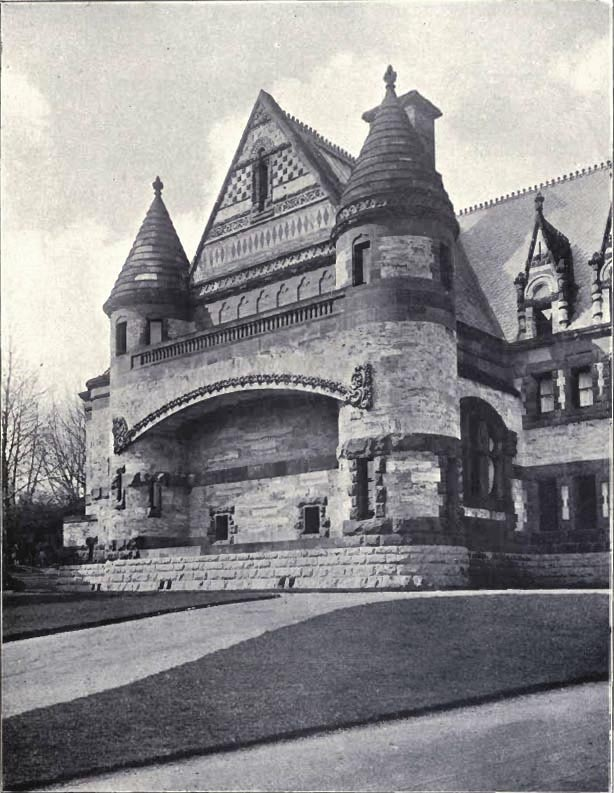
Lululaund, Bushey

At Bushey, Herkomer built a large house, Lululaund, named after Lulu Griffith, the second of his three wives, in a heavily German style, designed about 1886 by the American architect Henry Hobson Richardson, for whom he painted a portrait. This house was completed in 1894 and thereafter served as studio and school. It contained a theatre, where Herkomer put on productions of his own plays and musical compositions and also made films.

In 1899, King Otto of Bavaria ennobled Herkomer as "Ritter von Herkomer" and as a Knight of the Merit Order of the Bavarian Crown. The same year, he was awarded the Pour le Mérite award for the arts by the Emperor of Germany.

On her deathbed, in 1901, Queen Victoria was initially photographed in study and eventually painted by Herkomer as an alternative to the more traditional mask produced in wax, which her son, the new king Edward VII, decried. The painting, showing the Queen lying half-length among lilies and other flowers, swathed in white tulle, her right hand holding a cross, is part of the Royal Collection, held at Osborne House on the Isle of Wight, where it hangs in the Pavilion Principal Stairs Vestibule. Herkomer delivered the inaugural address at the opening of Bristol City Museum & Art Gallery in 1903. His painting, The Old Guards' Cheer was given to the gallery by H. O. Wills purchased after being exhibited the same year by the Fine Art Society. In 1907, Herkomer was knighted by King Edward VII.

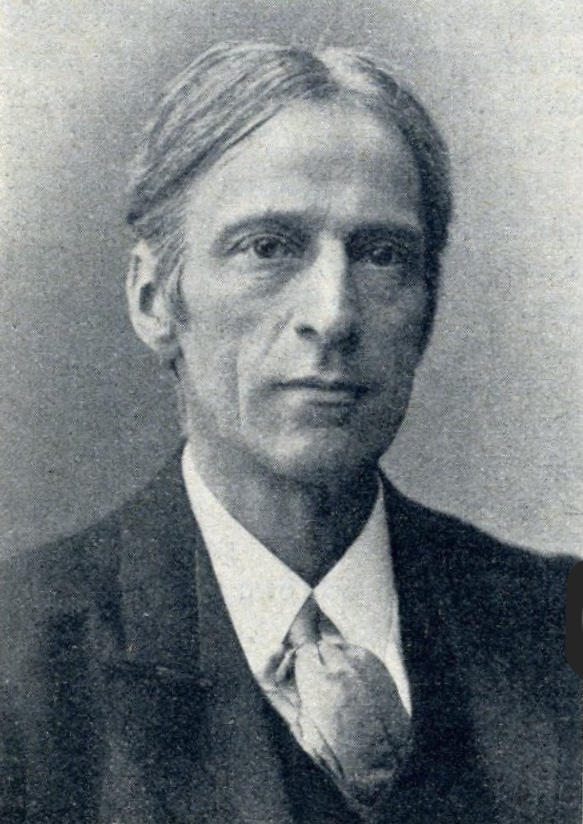
Herkomer in 1909

Herkomer exhibited a large number of memorable portraits, figure subjects, and landscapes, both in oil and watercolour; he achieved marked success as a worker in enamel, as an etcher, a mezzotint engraver, and an illustrative draughtsman and he exercised wide influence upon art education by means of the Herkomer School (Incorporated) at Bushey, which he founded in 1883 and directed without payment until 1904, when he retired. It was voluntarily wound up in 1926 having been run up to that time by his former pupil, Lucy Kemp-Welch. It is now defunct.

Despite being a prominent member of Royal Academy of Arts, Royal Watercolour Society, and Royal Society of Painter-Etchers, as well as being on familiar terms with the royal family, Herkomer was never totally accepted by the British establishment, as he was ultimately a victim of the deteriorating relationship between Great Britain and Germany, which he shuttled between, spending most of his summers in Bavaria.

Four of his pictures, Found (1885), Sir Henry Tate (1897), Portrait of Lady Tate (1899) and The Council of the Royal Academy (1908), are in the national collection at the Tate Gallery. In 1907, he received the honorary degree of Doctor of Civil Law at Oxford, and a knighthood was conferred upon him by the king. He was already a Commander of the Royal Victorian Order.

Herkomer was also a pioneering filmmaker. He established a studio at Lululaund and directed some seven historical costume dramas designed to be shown accompanied by his own music. None of them is known to have survived.

Herkomer had strong connections with Wales. His second and third wives hailed from Ruthin, and he spent long periods in Snowdonia painting with his friend, Charles Mansel Lewis from Stradey Castle, Llanelli. In 1899, Herkomer designed the Grand Sword of the Gorsedd of Bards, and he also designed some of its other regalia. Of Herkomer's work for the Gorsedd, Jan Morris has noted that he "created for its functionaries gloriously neo-Druidical robes and insignia of gold, velvet, and ermine (the Archdruid's breastplate was designed to choke him, Herkomer said, if he gave a false judgement)." In recognition of his contributions to Welsh art and his involvement with the National Eisteddfod, Herkomer was invested into the Gorsedd and received the bardic name "Gomer".

Herkomer was an enthusiast of cars and car racing. In 1907, he established Germany's first touring car rally, the Herkomer-Konkurrenz. This rally was revived in 1997 and still takes place in Landsberg every other year.

== Personal life ==
In 1873, at Watford, Herkomer married Anna Caroline Ada Weise. A son, Siegfried Hubert, was born in 1875 and a daughter, Elsa Anna Iole, the next year. His first wife died in Vienna in 1883. In 1884, Herkomer married Eliza Louisa Griffiths, aged 35, known as Lulu, at Ruthin. She died a year later in child-birth. He then married a third wife, Maggie Griffiths, the sister of Lulu, also from Ruthin.

In 1888, Herkomer's father, Lorenz Herkomer, died at Watford aged 73. The next year, Herkomer's third wife gave birth to a son who was named Lorenz Hans Lawrence. In 1893, they had a daughter, Gwenddydd.

== Death and legacy ==
Herkomer died at Budleigh Salterton on 31 March 1914 and was buried in the churchyard beside St James's Church, Bushey.

Paintings by Herkomer are in several British collections, including the Manchester Art Gallery, Southampton City Art Gallery, Leeds Art Gallery, Lady Lever Art Gallery, Walker Art Gallery, Liverpool, Oldham, Derby Art Gallery and the City of London. The largest collection of his work is held by Bushey Museum, and some examples are in the Herkomer Museum at Landsberg am Lech, Germany. Herkomer's portrait of H.H. Richardson can be found in the Smithsonian Portrait Gallery in Washington, DC.

Among his pupils at the Herkomer School of Art in Bushey were many artists who later became notable in their own right, including Cecil Jay, Rosa Howlett and Beryl Fowler.

Herkomer's connection with the 1896 Eisteddfod is commemorated in the naming of Herkomer Crescent and Herkomer Road, Llandudno.

== Gallery ==
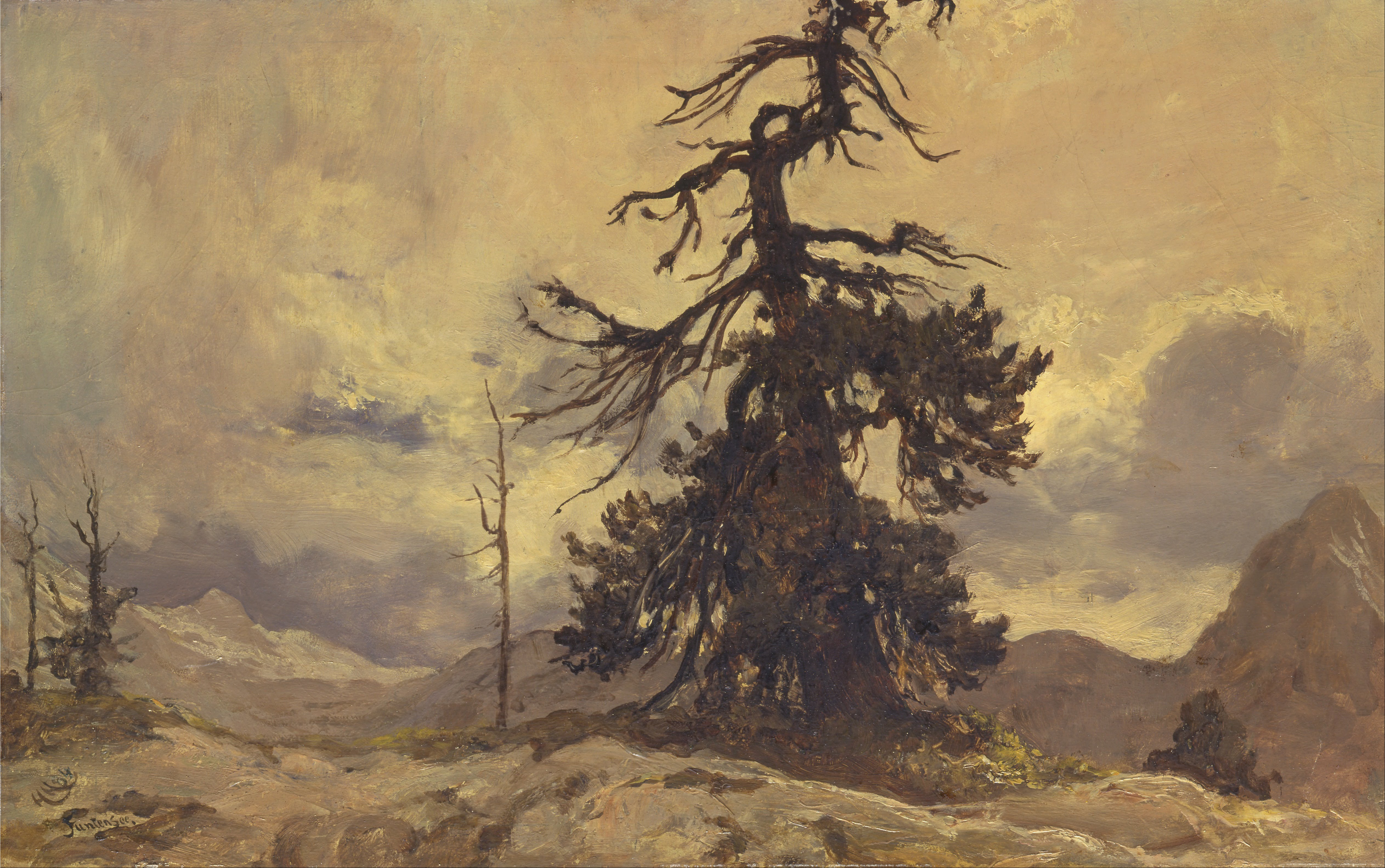
The Dying Monarch, Funtensee, 1884

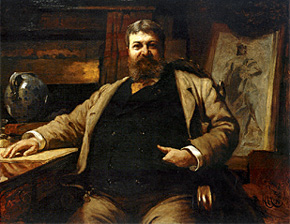
Portrait of Henry Hobson Richardson (1886)

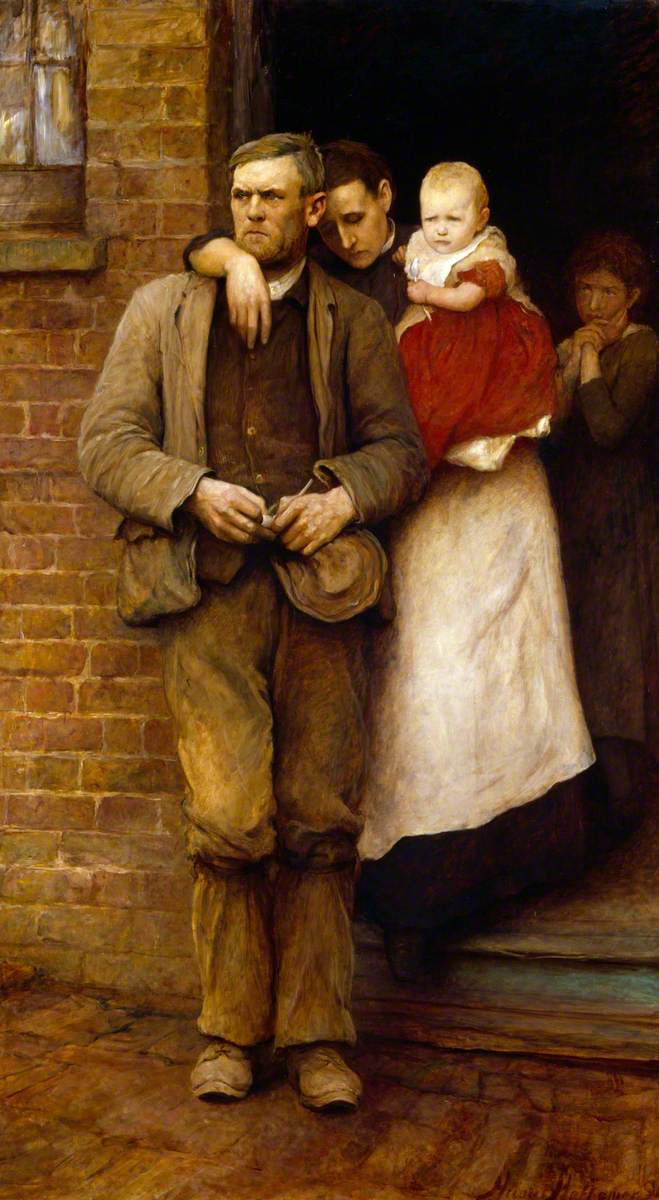
On Strike, 1891

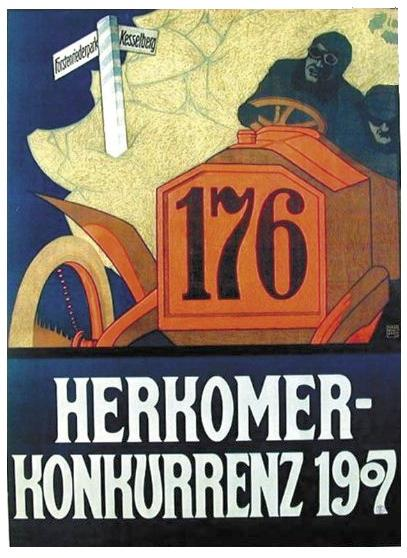
Poster for the rally initiated by Herkomer (1907).

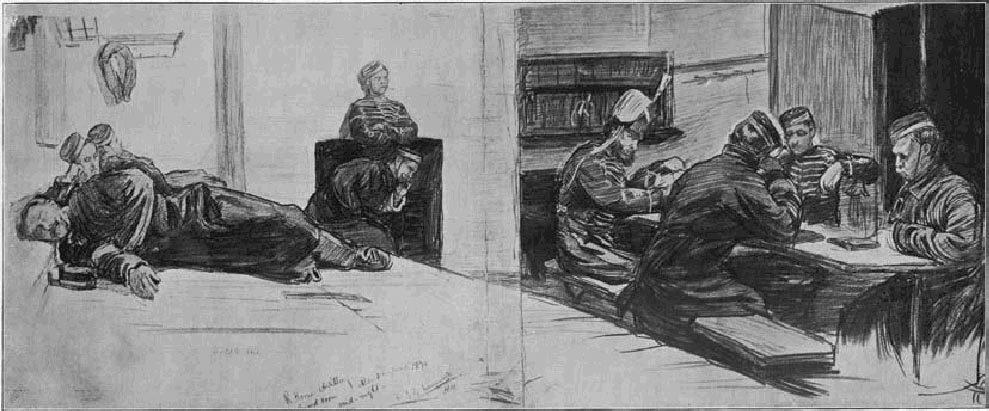
A Guard-Room at Aldershot (1870)

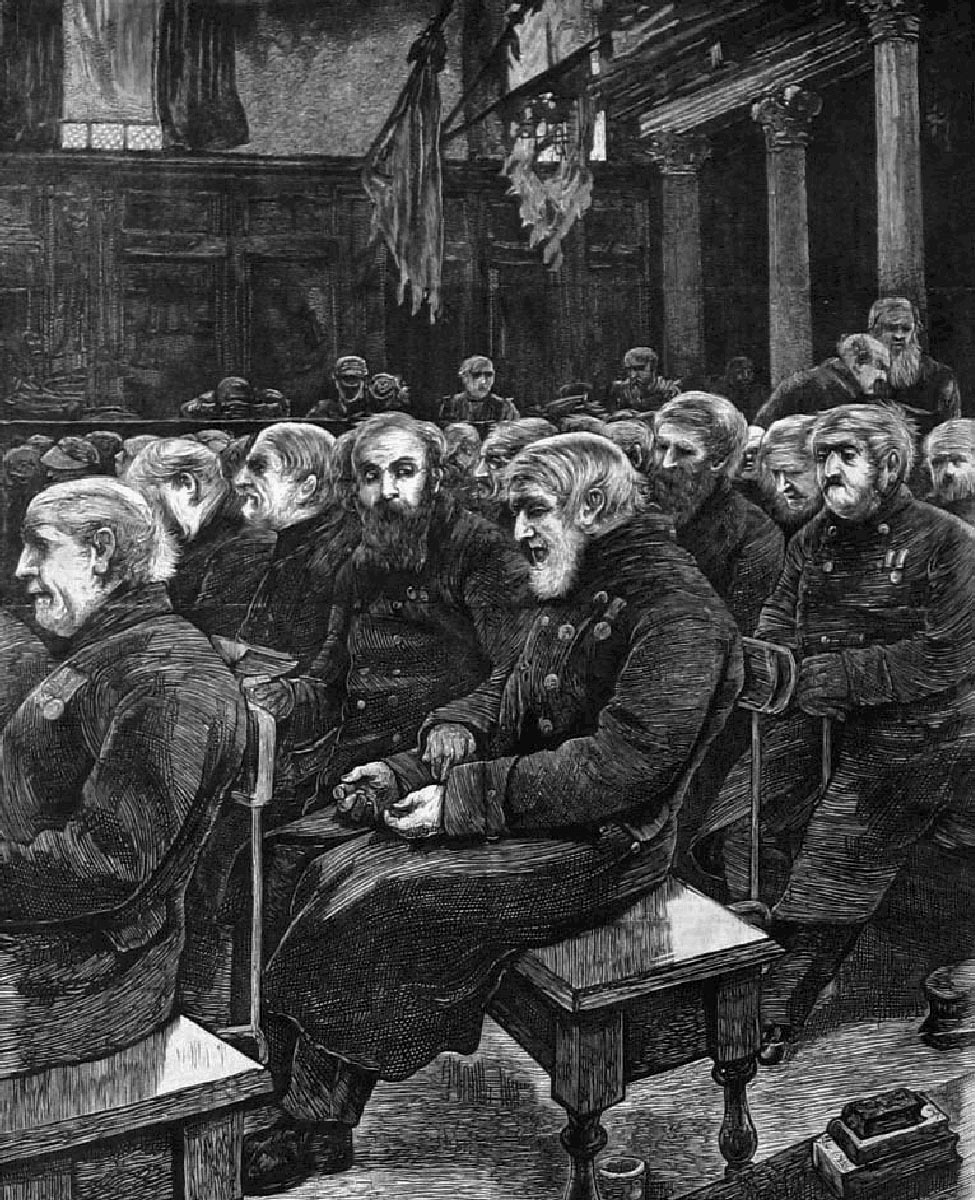
Sunday at the Chelsea Hospital (1871).

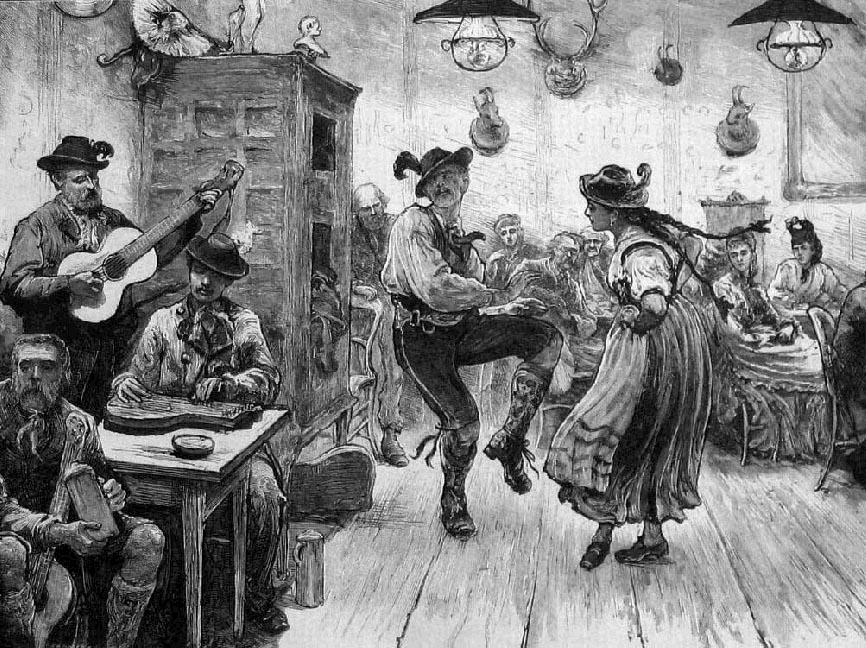
The 'Schuhplattl' Dance (1873)

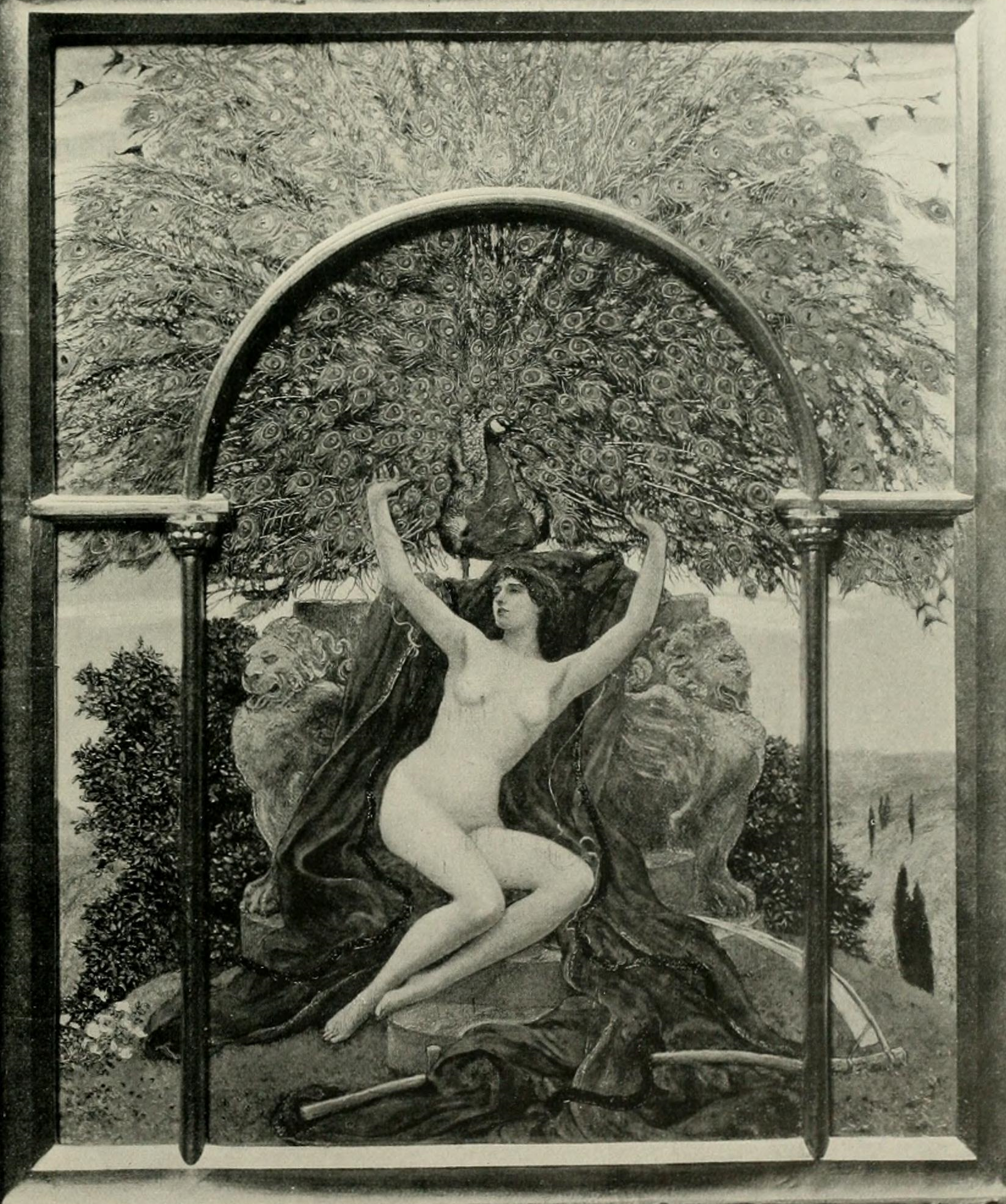
Beauty's Altar, 1900

== Writings ==
- Art Tuition, (Peacock, Printer, 1882; p19) – lecture in Birmingham Town Hall, on February 10, 1882.
- The Pictorial Music Play. (Magazine of Art, July 1889, pp. 316–24).
- Scenic Art. (Magazine of Art, July 1889, pp. 316–24).
- From Handel to Hallé. Biographical Sketches by Louis Engel. With Autobiographies of Prof. Huxley and Prof. Herkomer (London: Swan Sonnenschein & Co., 1890), pp. 135–225.
- Autobiography of Hubert Herkomer (Printed for private circulation, 1890, p71).
- Etching and Mezzotint Engraving (London: Macmillan, 1892, p107).
- A new Black and White Art, 1896, p58.
- A certain phase of lithography (London: Macmillan, 1910, p38) – a lecture in Lululaund, for invited guests, on January 27, 1910.
- My School and my Gospel (London : A. Constable and Co. Ltd., 1908).
- The Herkomers. Vol. 1. (London: Macmillan, 1910).
- The Herkomers. Vol. 2. (London: Macmillan, 1911).
