= Primary schools in Hertsmere =

Schools in Hertfordshire, England

This page provides brief details of primary schools in the borough of Hertsmere in Hertfordshire, England, United Kingdom.

All the state-funded primary schools in Hertsmere are co-educational. There are two Jewish schools, three Roman Catholic schools and three Church of England schools in the district, all of which are voluntary aided schools with the exception of St John's (Radlett) which is a voluntary controlled school. Except for four foundation schools, the remaining schools are all non-faith community schools. The Local Education Authority is Hertfordshire County Council.

There are still some linked pairs of infant schools and junior schools, with the infant school covering Reception and Key Stage 1 (Years 1 and 2) and the junior school covering Key Stage 2 (Years 3 to 6). However most have been amalgamated in a single Junior Mixed Infant (JMI) school or (equivalently) primary school.

== Bushey ==
| Name | Faith | Type | Gov | Opened | Intake | DCSF number | Ofsted number | Web | Coordinates |
|---|---|---|---|---|---|---|---|---|---|
| Ashfield | – | Junior | VC | 1845 | 60 | 3012 | 117391 | W | 51.6394°N 0.3571°W |
| Bournehall | – | Primary | CY | 1969 | 30 | 2360 | 117296 | W | 51.6499°N 0.3604°W |
| Bushey Heath | – | Primary | CY | 1879 | 30 | 2012 | 117088 | W | 51.6368°N 0.3413°W |
| Bushey Manor | – | Junior | CY | 1907 | 60 | 2261 | 117242 | W | 51.6470°N 0.3757°W |
| Falconer | – | Special | CY | | | 7033 | 117686 | W | 51.6470°N 0.3682°W |
| Hartsbourne | – | Primary | CY | | 30 | 2372 | 117300 | W | 51.6312°N 0.3425°W |
| Highwood | – | Primary | CY | 1949 | 60 | 2013 | 117089 | W | 51.6658°N 0.3750°W |
| Little Reddings | – | Primary | FD | | 51 | 5208 | 117568 | W | 51.6474°N 0.3560°W |
| Meadow Wood | – | Special | CY | | | 7043 | 117691 | W | 51.6483°N 0.3506°W |
| Merry Hill | – | Infants | CY | 1885 | 60 | 2014 | 117090 | W | 51.6380°N 0.3555°W |
| Sacred Heart | RC | Primary | VA | 1970 | 40 | 3415 | 117488 | W | 51.6440°N 0.3711°W |

The first public elementary schools in Bushey were national schools, established in 1827 in buildings near St James's church. As usual for the time, there were separate schools for infants and older boys and girls. A non-denominational British school for boys was built on Merry Hill Lane (now School Lane) in 1845, after which the boys' national school soon closed. In 1866, Arthur Ashfield donated £5455 to the boys' school, which was renamed Ashfield School in 1919.

When the Bushey school board was established in 1879, it took over the running of the three schools, moving the girls' and infants schools from the Congregational Church lecture hall to new premises on Merry Hill Lane in 1885. The girls' school was renamed Bushey Girls' Board School in 1889, and Merry Hill Board School in 1900, amalgamating with the infants department in 1923. In 1972 the last junior girls left the school, now known as Merry Hill Infants School and linked with Ashfield School.

The board also established an infants school on The Rutts in 1879, absorbing a girls' and infants school founded in 1850. The school was extended and modernised in 1967, becoming Bushey Heath Primary School.

The Bushey board also built schools for infants, boys and girls on London Road, on the site now occupied by Bushey Health Centre. The infants school was abolished in 1929, when the girls' school became a senior school. London Road Boys' Elementary School moved to Grange Road in 1957, becoming Bushey Manor Junior School in the 1960s. It is linked with Bushey and Oxhey Infant School, which is just inside the boundary of Watford.

== Radlett and Shenley ==
| Name | Faith | Type | Gov | Opened | Intake | DCSF number | Ofsted | Web | Coordinates |
|---|---|---|---|---|---|---|---|---|---|
| Clore Shalom | J | Primary | VA | 1999 | 30 | 5213 | 131456 | W | 51.7041°N 0.2896°W |
| Fair Field | – | Junior | FD | | 60 | 5212 | 117228 | W | 51.6798°N 0.3351°W |
| Hertsmere | J | Primary | VA | 1999 | 60 | 3304 | 131955 | W | 51.6697°N 0.3059°W |
| Newberries | – | Primary | CY | | 30 | 2378 | 117303 | W | 51.6820°N 0.3077°W |
| Shenley | – | Primary | CY | 1841 | 45 | 2108 | 117150 | W | 51.6901°N 0.2800°W |
| St John's | CE | Infant | VC | | 60 | 3003 | 117383 | W | 51.6827°N 0.3255°W |

St Martin's School was established in Shenley in 1841, next to the church, which was built at the same time. It was a national school, and catered for boys only. In 1853 the National School for Girls (now the village hall) was built. The Shenley School Board was established in 1878, and built a Board School for Girls and Infants, replacing the girls' national school. The board school building on London Road forms part of Shenley Primary School today.

The first elementary school serving Radlett, Elstree and Borehamwood was Medburn Boys Elementary School established in 1864 on Watling Street to the south of Radlett. The school was built by the Brewers' Company to replace the demolished lower school of Aldenham School. In the 1870s, under the Endowed Schools Act 1869, Commissioners diverted more than half of the proceeds of the sale of land in St Pancras, left by Richard Platt as the endowment of Aldenham School, which had been compulsorily purchased as the site of the new St Pancras railway station. £8,000 went to two elementary schools, Medburn School, Radlett, and Delrow School, Aldenham, and Radlett Girls and Infant Elementary School was built at the bottom of Loom Lane in 1878. A separate infants school was established in Cobden Hill in 1902. All three schools were run by the Church of England until 1944. By the late 1950s, after the construction of Fair Field Junior School. the Loom lane and Cobden Hill buildings operated just as an infant school with what are now year 1 classes at Cobden Hill and year 2 classes at Loom Lane. They closed in the 1960s, after the construction of Newberries Primary School and St Johns Church of England Infant and Nursery School . The buildings of the former boys' school are now Medburn Kennels, while the former girls' school buildings are now a private house and the Youth and Community Centre.

The Platt funds were also used to establish Delrow Boys Elementary School in Summerhouse Lane, Round Bush (serving Aldenham) in 1865, lasting until the 1930s.

Clore Shalom School and Hertsmere Jewish Primary School are the only Jewish faith primary schools in Hertfordshire, and are feeders for Yavneh College in Borehamwood.

== Borehamwood and Elstree ==
| Name | Faith | Type | Gov | Opened | Intake | DCSF number | Ofsted | Web | Coordinates |
|---|---|---|---|---|---|---|---|---|---|
| Cowley Hill | – | Primary | CY | | 60 | 2030 | 117099 | W | 51.6647°N 0.2736°W |
| Kenilworth | – | Primary | CY | | 30 | 2155 | 117183 | W | 51.6550°N 0.2565°W |
| Meryfield | – | Primary | CY | 1954 | 60 | 2156 | 117184 | W | 51.6651°N 0.2870°W |
| Monksmead | – | Primary | CY | 1958 | 30 | 2224 | 117219 | W | 51.6544°N 0.2663°W |
| Parkside | – | Primary | FD | | 30 | 5202 | 117562 | W | 51.6700°N 0.2810°W |
| Saffron Green | – | Primary | CY | 1954 | 30 | 2181 | 117195 | W | 51.6506°N 0.2527°W |
| St Nicholas | CE | Primary | VA | | 30 | 3333 | 117431 | W | 51.6447°N 0.2964°W |
| St Teresa's | RC | Primary | VA | | 30 | 3384 | 117466 | W | 51.6602°N 0.2711°W |
| Summerswood | – | Primary | CY | | 60 | 2154 | 117182 | W | 51.6503°N 0.2678°W |
| Woodlands | – | Primary | CY | 1956 | 30 | 2153 | 117181 | W | 51.6657°N 0.2739°W |

== Potters Bar ==
| Name | Faith | Type | Gov | Opened | Intake | DCSF number | Ofsted | Web | Coordinates |
|---|---|---|---|---|---|---|---|---|---|
| Cranborne | – | Primary | CY | 1933 | 60 | 2980 | 117369 | W | 51.6998°N 0.1992°W |
| Ladbrooke | – | JMI | CY | 1861 | 30 | 2982 | 117370 | W | 51.6962°N 0.1796°W |
| Oakmere | – | Primary | CY | 1958 | 60 | 2985 | 117371 | W | 51.6945°N 0.1644°W |
| Pope Paul | RC | Primary | VA | | 30 | 3975 | 117496 | W | 51.6901°N 0.1988°W |
| St Giles' | CE | Primary | VA | 1870 | 15 | 5204 | 117564 | W | 51.6949°N 0.2318°W |
| The Wroxham | – | Primary | FD | | 30 | 5206 | 117566 | W | 51.6994°N 0.2140°W |

The first National School to serve Potters Bar was erected on Barnet Road between St. Vincent's Way and Hill Rise, in October 1839. It was replaced in 1872 by St John's School, which lasted until 1954.

A new infants' school was built on the High Street in August 1861 by Rev. H.G. Watkins on his own land, and took over the infants from the national school. The building still stands, and is Grade II listed. It housed an expanded senior school from 1833 to 1938, after which it became an infant and junior school, renamed Ladbrooke School after the farm to the West of the High Street that had just been replaced by a housing estate. In April 1998 the school moved to new buildings on the site of the former Parkfield School (1938–1960). The new access road to the school was named Watkins Rise in memory of the school's founder.

A former school in the area was Sunnybank Primary School (1960–2007) 51.6890°N 0.1889°W.

== See also ==
Secondary schools in Hertsmere :

- Bushey Meads School
- Dame Alice Owen's School
- The Grange Academy
- Hertswood Academy
- Mount Grace School
- Queens' School
- Yavneh College
