= Primary schools in Watford =

This article provides brief details of primary schools in the borough of Watford in Hertfordshire, England, United Kingdom. Some Watford children attend schools in the neighbouring boroughs of Three Rivers and Hertsmere.

All of the state-funded primary schools in Watford are co-educational. There are two Roman Catholic schools in the borough, both of which are voluntary aided schools. The remaining schools are all non-faith community schools. The Local Education Authority is Hertfordshire County Council.

There are still some linked pairs of infant schools and junior schools, with the infant school covering Reception and Key Stage 1 (Years 1 and 2) and the junior school covering Key Stage 2 (Years 3 to 6). However most have been amalgamated in a single Junior Mixed Infant (JMI) school or (equivalently) primary school.

== Central Watford, West Watford and Oxhey ==
| Name | Faith | Type | Opened | Intake | DCSF number | Ofsted number | Web | Coordinates |
|---|---|---|---|---|---|---|---|---|
| Bromet | – | Primary | | 40 | 2385 | 117308 | W | 51.6417°N 0.3882°W |
| Bushey and Oxhey | – | Infant | 1881 | 60 | 2117 | 117157 | W | 51.6474°N 0.3800°W |
| Central | – | Primary | 1950 | 30 | 2116 | 117156 | W | 51.6558°N 0.3920°W |
| Chater | – | Infants | 1909 | 60 | 2122 | 117159 | W | 51.6538°N 0.4086°W |
| Chater | – | Junior | 1909 | 60 | 2120 | 117158 | W | 51.6538°N 0.4030°W |
| Field | – | Infants | 1891 | 60 | 2124 | 117161 | W | 51.6509°N 0.3931°W |
| Field | – | Junior | 1891 | 60 | 2123 | 117160 | W | 51.6495°N 0.3936°W |
| Holywell | – | Primary | | 60 | 2349 | 117290 | W | 51.6441°N 0.4181°W |
| Laurance Haines | – | Primary | 1972 | 60 | 2398 | 117320 | W | 51.6470°N 0.4075°W |
| St Anthony's | RC | Primary | 1974 | 30 | 2428 | 117495 | W | 51.6477°N 0.4201°W |

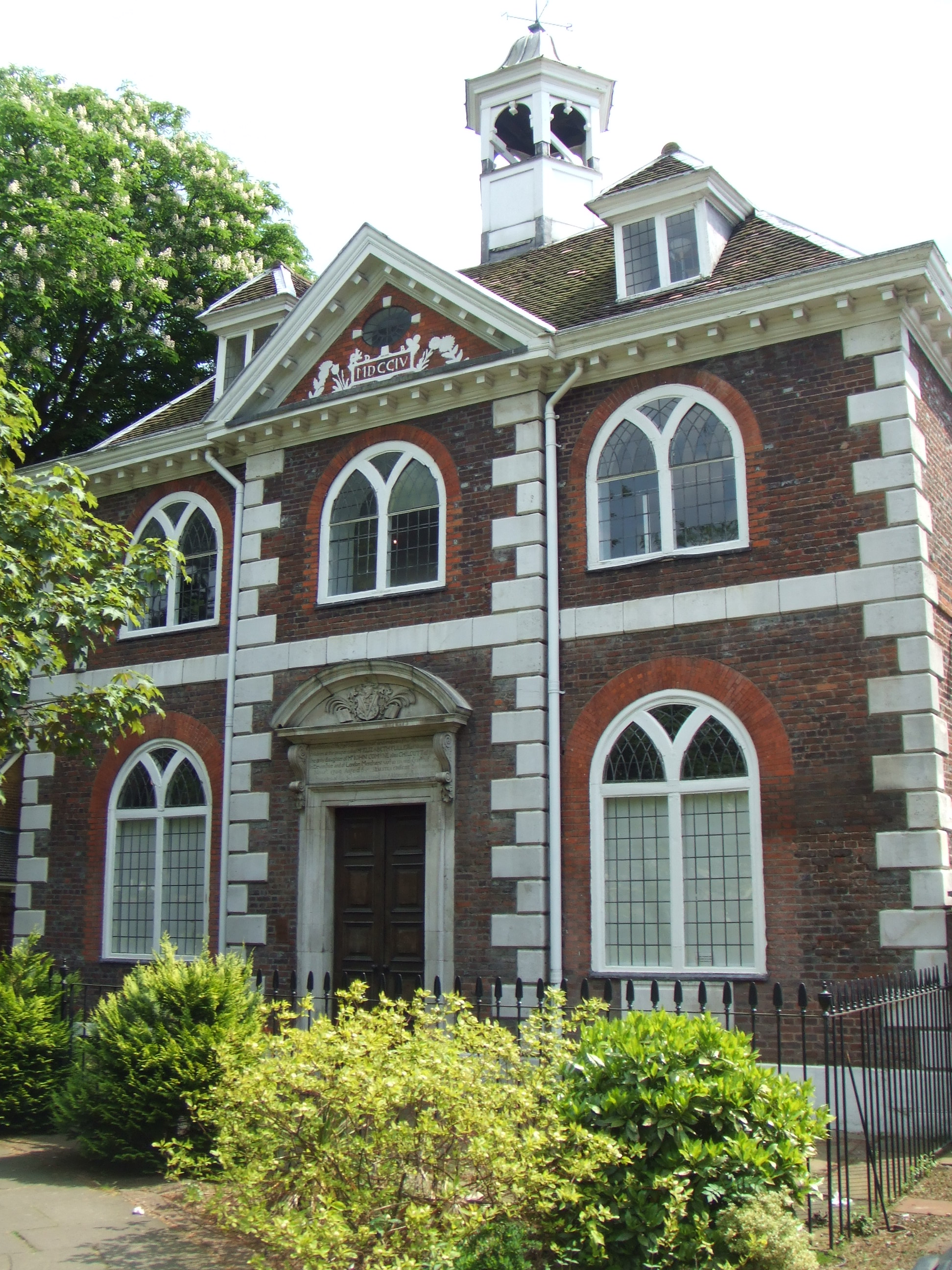
Watford Free School building

In the mid-19th century, the only schools in Watford were Mrs Fuller's Free School (established in 1704), by now in a poor state, and St Mary's National Schools (separate schools for boys and girls, founded in 1841). They were joined in 1859 by British schools, initially in Red Lion Yard and later moving to Sotheron Road (girls) and Beechen Grove (boys). Another set of National schools, attached to St Andrew's Church, were founded in 1860. The Free School closed in 1882, and its endowment contributed to founding the Watford Endowed Schools, which provided secondary education and charged fees. St Mary's National Schools closed in 1922, and the site is now occupied by the multi-storey Church car park.

The Watford school board was established in 1883, and was chaired by Edward Mitchell Chater throughout its existence. The British schools and St Andrew's national schools became board schools the following year. The first new schools built by the board were the Watford Fields Schools, now known as the Field Schools. The infants school moved to its present site in 1981. The British boys' school closed in 1897, with the opening of Fearnly Street School, renamed Victoria School in 1903. The St Andrew's national schools continued until 1922.

Following the Education Act 1902, the school board was abolished in 1903, and control of the schools passed to the Hertfordshire County Council. The original Chater Schools, named after Edward Chater, consisted of two separate buildings on the site now occupied by the infants school, with juniors entering from Southsea Avenue, and infants from Harwoods Road. The schools were rebuilt in 1988, with the junior school moving to the site of the former Victoria School.

Bushey and Oxhey Infant School was founded as Oxhey Village School, taking the name Oxhey Infants when it was rebuilt and enlarged in the 1960s. More recently it has been renamed Bushey and Oxhey Infants School It is linked with Bushey Manor Junior School (see Primary schools in Hertsmere).

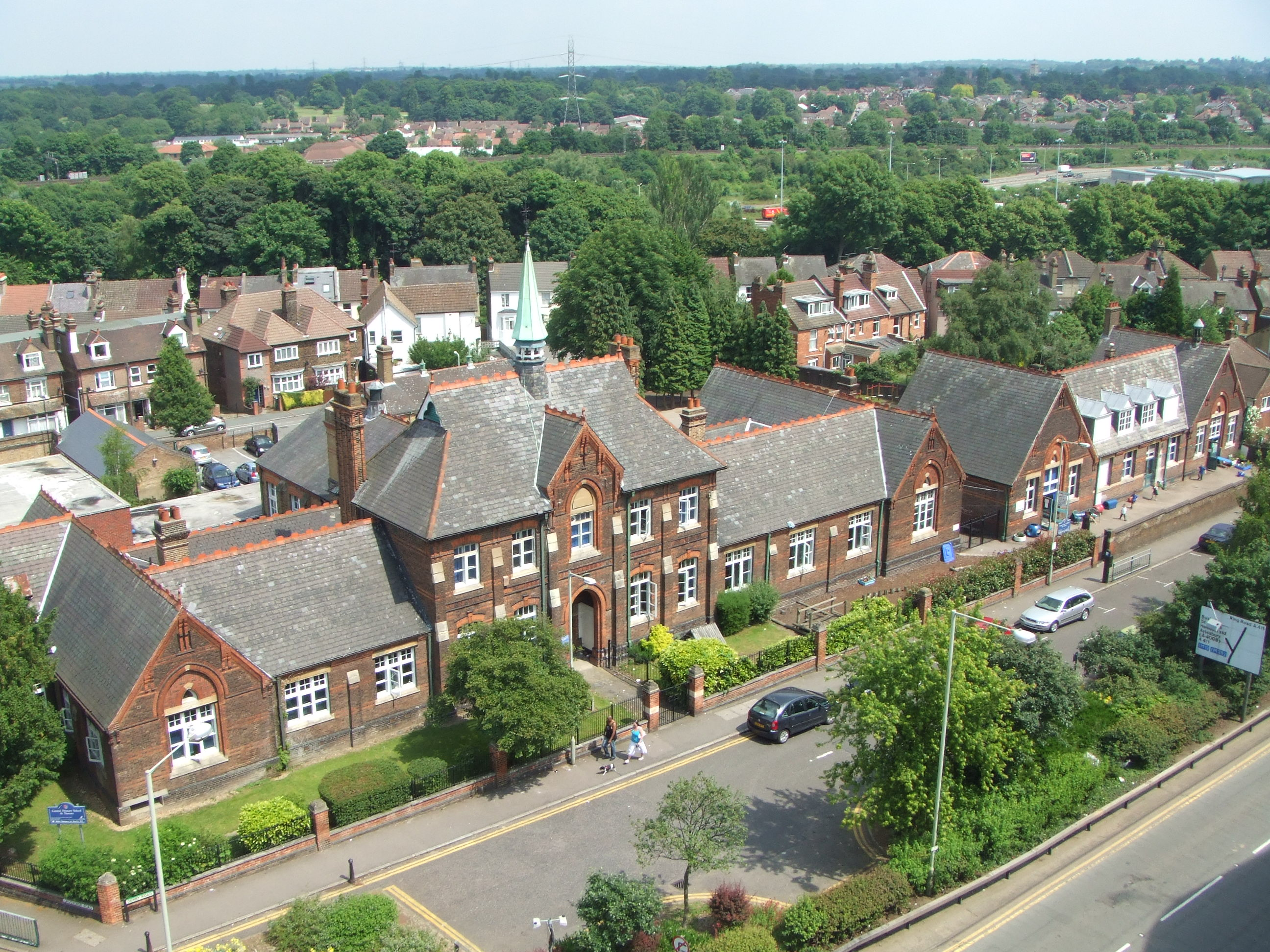
Central Primary School

Central Primary School occupies a Grade II listed building built in 1884 to house the Watford Grammar School for Boys, which moved to West Watford in 1912. Watford Grammar School for Girls resided in the smaller building next door in the same period. The buildings then housed the Watford Central School until its move to Bushey in 1950 to become Bushey Grammar School, one of the predecessors of Queens' School. (The legend "Higher Elementary Schools", in terracotta tiles on the front of the building, replaced the earlier "Watford Endowed Schools" at the time of the Central School.)

The school badge is based on that of the Watford Central School, which featured a crosslet fitchy and a scallop, details from the arms of Capell (Earl of Essex) and Villiers (Earl of Clarendon) respectively, though the crosslet has since been altered to a sword.

A proposal to open a one-form entry Muslim school in Tolpits Lane, West Watford has been approved by Hertfordshire County Council and passed to the Department for Children, Schools and Families for a final decision.

== North Watford and Garston ==
| Name | Faith | Type | Opened | Intake | DCSF number | Ofsted number | Web | Coordinates |
|---|---|---|---|---|---|---|---|---|
| Alban Wood | – | Primary | | 30 | 3981 | 134685 | W | 51.6972°N 0.4003°W |
| Beechfield | – | Primary | | 30 | 2020 | 117094 | W | 51.6759°N 0.4076°W |
| Berrygrove | – | Primary | 2005 | 90 | 3980 | 134684 | W | 51.6834°N 0.3854°W |
| Cassiobury | – | Infants | 1968 | 60 | 2354 | 117293 | W | 51.6670°N 0.4220°W |
| Cassiobury | – | Junior | 1968 | 60 | 2132 | 117167 | W | 51.6684°N 0.4225°W |
| Cherry Tree | – | Primary | | 30 | 2432 | 117339 | W | 51.6815°N 0.4040°W |
| Coates Way | – | JMI | 1972 | 30 | 2433 | 117340 | W | 51.6945°N 0.3793°W |
| Holy Rood | RC | Primary | 1885 | 60 | 3985 | 127416 | W | 51.6814°N 0.4258°W |
| Kingsway | – | Infants | 1938 | 60 | 2395 | 117317 | W | 51.6887°N 0.4076°W |
| Kingsway | – | Junior | 1938 | 60 | 2133 | 117168 | W | 51.6888°N 0.4060°W |
| Knutsford | – | Primary | 1939 | 60 | 2130 | 117165 | W | 51.6708°N 0.3870°W |
| Leavesden Green | – | JMI | | 30 | 2407 | 117324 | W | 51.6921°N 0.4085°W |
| Nascot Wood | – | Infants | 1971 | 60 | 2991 | 117374 | W | 51.6705°N 0.4092°W |
| Nascot Wood | – | Junior | 1971 | 60 | 2389 | 117311 | W | 51.6703°N 0.4106°W |
| Orchard | – | Primary | 1958 | 30 | 2115 | 117155 | W | 51.6805°N 0.4132°W |
| Parkgate | – | Infants | 1907 | 60 | 2126 | 117163 | W | 51.6783°N 0.3917°W |
| Parkgate | – | Junior | 1907 | 60 | 2125 | 117162 | W | 51.6750°N 0.3936°W |

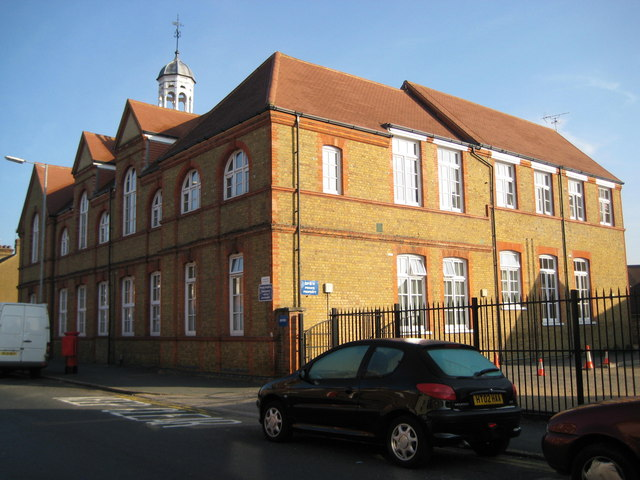
Former Callowland School building

The Watford school board also built two schools (both since closed) in North Watford: a Callowland Boys' School (1892, 51.6689°N 0.3991°W) and Alexandra Mixed School (1901, 51.6727°N 0.4002°W). The higher elementary department of Alexandra School later became a secondary modern school in Bushey, the other predecessor of Queens' School.

Berrygrove Primary School replaced Meriden Primary, Garston Infants and Lea Farm Junior (formerly Garston Junior) Schools.

The Cassiobury schools lie within the affluent Cassiobury estate, and are heavily oversubscribed, with 4 applicants per place. The junior school has the highest Key Stage 2 results in Watford, and half of the pupils typically go on to Watford Grammar School for Boys and Watford Grammar School for Girls. The schools' badge features an earl's coronet over the arms of the Capell family (Earls of Essex), owners of the original Cassiobury, which included the site of the modern estate.

Holy Rood Catholic Primary School is the oldest Roman Catholic school in Watford, started by the Dominican sisters as St Vincent's, a board school in Beechen Grove. In 1893 the school moved to a new building (now Grade II listed) adjacent to Holy Rood church in central Watford, taking its new name from the church in 1896. It taught pupils up to the age of 14 until the opening of St. Michael's Catholic High School in 1955, when it became a primary school. After many decades of overcrowding, the school moved to its present site in 1969.

Knutsford Primary School lost its original school building in a fire in November 1999. After three years in temporary accommodation in the school fields, the school moved into a new building on the original site in 2002. The school is oversubscribed, with 3.5 applicants per place.

The Nascot Wood schools, within the affluent Nascot Wood area, are the most oversubscribed in Watford, with nearly 5 applicants for each place. The area was formerly part of the Cassiobury Park estate of the Earls of Essex. The school badge, an earl's coronet over a monogram "SX", was the mark of the 5th Earl, George Capell-Coningsby (1757–1839).

Parkgate Junior School was originally a boys' school, becoming mixed in August 1921.
