= Elstree =

Village in Hertfordshire, England

Coordinates: 51°38′37″N 0°17′57″W

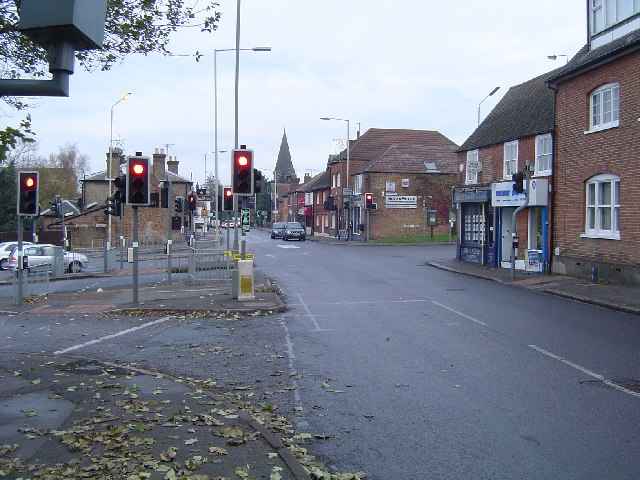
- Watling Street, Elstree

- Location within Hertfordshire
- Population: 5,110 (Ward, 2011)
- OS grid reference: TQ175955
- Civil parish: Elstree and Borehamwood
- District: Hertsmere
- Shire county: Hertfordshire
- Region: East
- Country: England
- Sovereign state: United Kingdom
- Post town: BOREHAMWOOD
- Postcode district: WD6
- Dialling code: 020
- Police: Hertfordshire
- Fire: Hertfordshire
- Ambulance: East of England
- UK Parliament: Hertsmere

Elstree /ˈɛlztri/ is a large village in the Hertsmere borough of Hertfordshire, England. It is about 11.5 miles (18.5 kilometres) northwest of central London on the former A5 road, which follows the course of Watling Street. In 2011, its population was 5,110. It forms part of the civil parish of Elstree and Borehamwood, originally known simply as Elstree.

The village often lends its shorter name to businesses and amenities in the adjacent town of Borehamwood, and the names of Elstree and Borehamwood are used interchangeably. Elstree is perhaps best known for multiple Elstree Film Studio complexes, where many films were made, including BBC Elstree Centre, where the TV soap opera EastEnders is shot. This production centre is actually in Borehamwood.

The local newspaper is the Borehamwood and Elstree Times. Together with Borehamwood, the village is twinned with Offenburg in Germany, Fontenay-aux-Roses in France, and Huainan in China.

== History ==
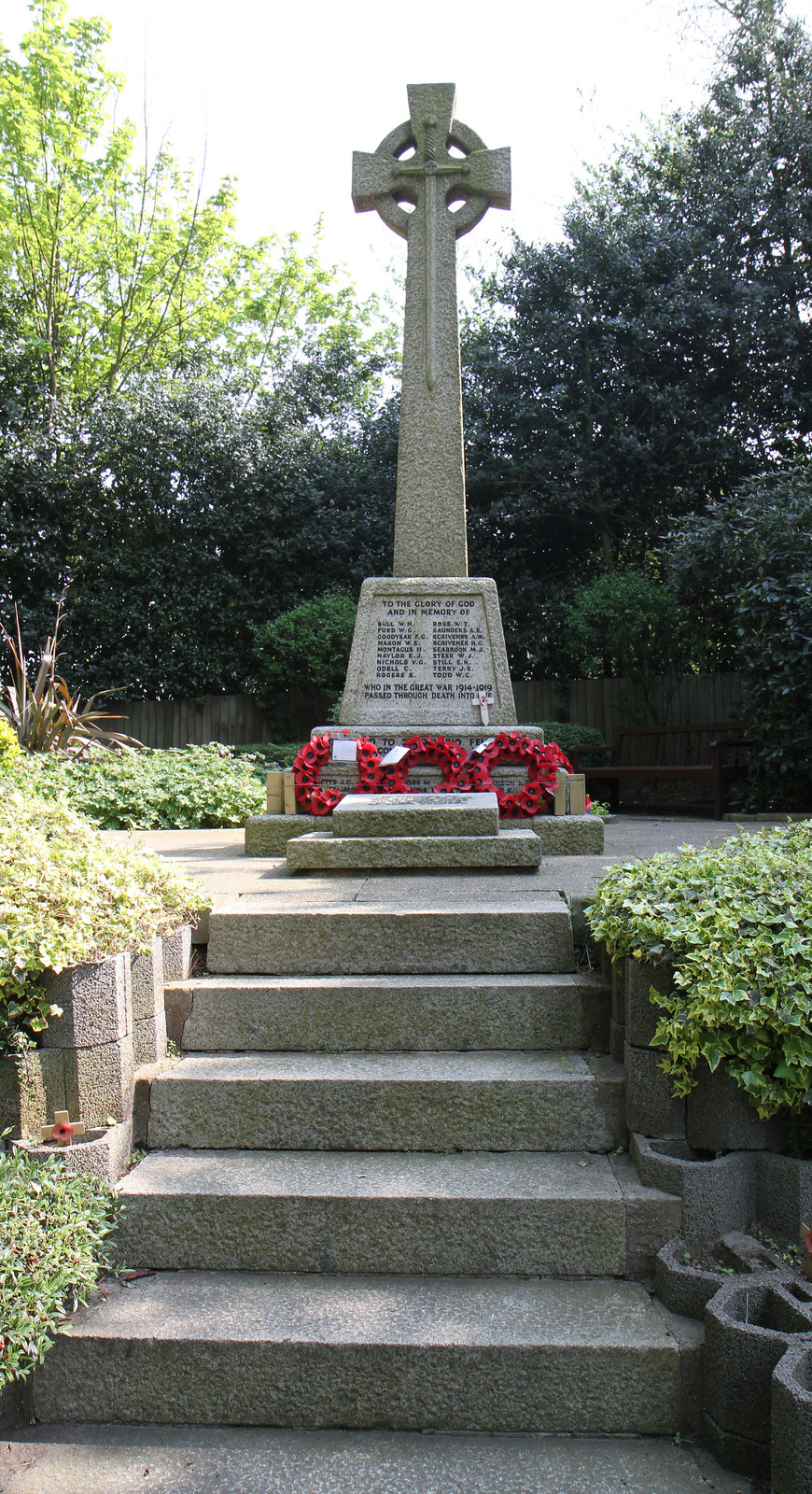
Elstree War Memorial, Elstree Hill North

=== Etymology ===
The name "Elstree" derives from the Anglo-Saxon phrase for "Tidwulf's Tree", which is mentioned as "Tidulfres treow" in an 11–12th-century manuscript of an A.D. 786 charter. It is thought that "the "T" [was] lost in the wrong division of 'aet Tidwulfes treo' ("at Tidwulf's Tree")."

A reference to a place in Hertford as "Ilestre" in 1460 may also be a variation.

In 1723, topographer John Norden noted in his book Speculum Britanniae, that in the county of Hartfordshire [sic] was one "Elstre or Eglestre". In an earlier edition, he writes:

"ELSTREE n. 20. in OFFAES grant EAGLESTRE
Nemus aquilinum: a place wherit may be thought Eagles bredd in time past, for though it be nowe hilly and heathy – it hath beene replenished with stately trees, fit for such fowle to breede and harbour in. It is parcell of the libertie of S. Albans.

Nemus aquilinum is the Latin for "grove of eagles".

Robinson Crusoe author, Daniel Defoe wrote in his 1748 travel guide that:

"Idlestrey or Elstre, is a Village on the Roman Watling-street, on the very Edge of Middlesex; but it is chiefly noted for its Situation, near Brockly-hill, by Stanmore, which affords a lovely View cross Middlesex, over the Thames, into Surry."

In 1811, topographer Daniel Lysons writes:

"The name of this place has been variously written; — Eaglestree, Elstree, Ilstrye, Idlestrye, etc. Norden says that it is called, in Offa's grant to the Abbey of St. Alban's, Eaglestree, that is, says he, "Nemus aquilinum, a 'place where it may be thought that eagles bred in time past'." It has been derived also from Idel-street, i.e. the noble road; and Ill-street, the decayed road. May it not have been, rather, a corruption of Eald-street, the old road, i.e. the ancient Watling-street, upon which it is situated?"

=== 5th century: Battle of Ailestreu (Elstree) ===
In the 5th century, British warlord Vortigern and his two sons, Vortimer and Catigern, took part in the Battle of Elstree, then called the Battle of Ailestreu, where the Saxon Horsa was killed. It's possible there is confusion with the Battle of Aylesbury. George Moberly writes:

"Nennius, MHB p. 69, calls the place of battle where Hors fell Episford; Britannicè 'Sathenegabail' = the Saxon battle. The Saxon Chronicle, ad a. 455, calls it Ægæles-threp, and Henry of Huntingdon, M.H.B. p. 708, Ailestreu. This would naturally be Elstree, of which name there is a place in Herts; but Beda's description of its situation has caused it rather to be referred to Aylesford in Kent, near which is a small village called Horsted."

=== 16th–18th centuries ===
The Manor of Elstree was formerly included in the Manor of Parkbury, and belonged to the Abbey of St. Albans. On the Dissolution of the Monasteries, it was granted by Henry VIII, to Anthony Denny (1501–1549).

In 1607, Anthony Denny's grandson Edward Denny sold part of the estate, with all manorial rights, to Robert Briscoe, who sold it the same year to Sir Baptist Hicks. Part of the estate became the Manor of Boreham, and was sold to Edward Beauchamp. It remained with the Beauchamp-Proctor family until 1748, when it was sold to James West, M.P. for St. Albans, who, in or about 1751, alienated it to a Mr Gulston of Widdial. Gulston then sold it to a Mr Pigfatt, a gunsmith, who, within a few years, conveyed it to Thomas Jemmet. In 1774, it was purchased from Mr Jemmet by the late George Byng, M.P. for Middlesex, who passed it on to his son, by which time the estate was called the Manor of Boreham.

In 1776, the House of Lords granted:

"An Act for dividing and closing the Common or Waste Ground, called Boreham Wood Common, in the Parish of Elstree otherwise Idletree, in the County of Hertford."

In 1796, topographer Daniel Lysons writes:

"The parish of Elstree contains about 3,000 acres of land, which is divided between arable and pasture nearly in an equal proportion. The soil is, for the most part, clay. Boreham Wood, a waste of nearly 700 acres, was inclosed about the year 1778, and is now in culture. This parish pays the sum of £151 11s 0d to the land-tax, which is raised by a rate of about 1s 9d in the pound".

== Transport ==
=== Elstree and Borehamwood railway station ===
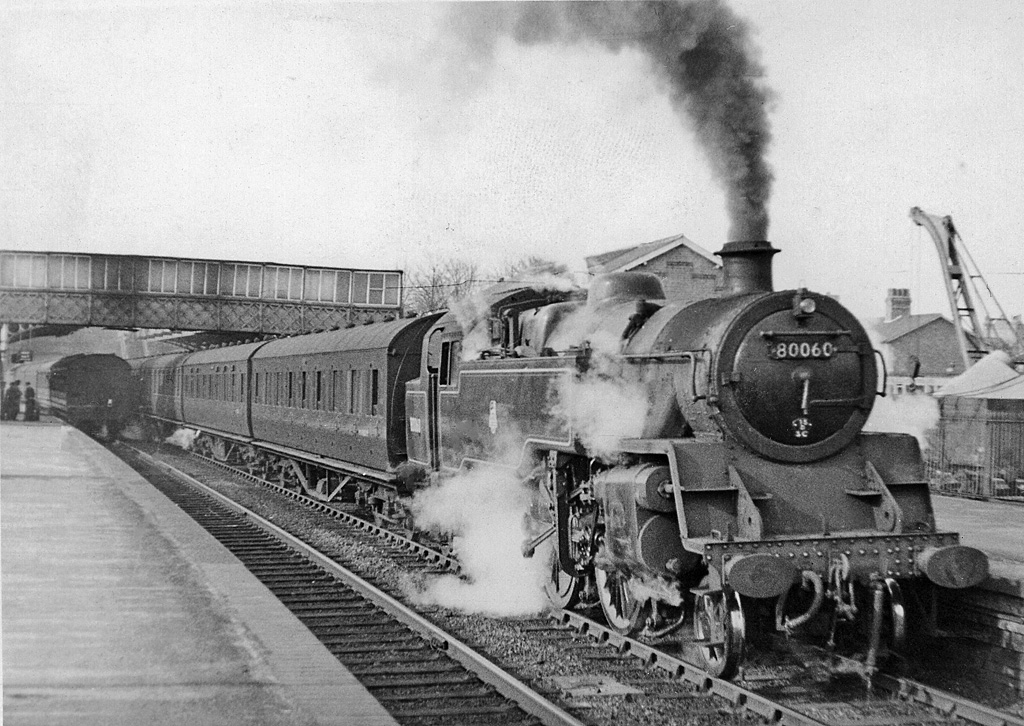
Northbound steam train passing through Elstree & Borehamwood railway station on 27 March 1954

Elstree & Borehamwood railway station is on the Midland Main Line between London St Pancras and Bedford. It was built by the Midland Railway in 1868, and is located just north of the 1,072-yard-long (980 m) Elstree Tunnels.

The area of Borehamwood to the west of the railway line, formally Deacon's Hill, is colloquially called Elstree even though it is not contiguous with the village. Elstree South Underground station was due to be an extension of the Northern line, planned in the 1930s, but never completed.

=== Road links ===
The old A5 road (Watling Street) goes through Elstree village, where it is designated as the A5183 road. Through the village, the road is called (from south to north) Elstree Hill South, High Street and Elstree Hill North. The 18th century Grade II listed building, Elstree Hill House, is still on Elstree Hill South, and used to be the home of the old Elstree School (see Schools). In the early 1900s, it was noted that:

".. the hill roads are remarkably direct and seldom curve to avoid the steep pitch, and it has been suggested that the roads were originally slides for the timber which used to be sent to London for fuel."

=== Elstree Aerodrome ===
Elstree Aerodrome is licensed by the CAA and has a 2,150-foot (717 yd; 655 m) paved runway, suitable most for light aircraft and turbine powered G A aircraft. It also is one of the main helicopter centres for north London and is extending its provision in this area. In the early 1930s, it was a grass landing strip for the local Aldenham House country club. A concrete runway was put down during World War II, and Wellington Bombers were modified here. After World War II the airfield was initially used to fly in converted Halifaxes stacked with food supplies to supplement the depleted British stocks; however, after an overloaded plane damaged the runway it was no longer used for this purpose.

On 29 November 1975, retired Formula One race car driver and Embassy Hill car owner Graham Hill and his racing driver Tony Brise were piloting a twin-engine six-seat Piper PA-23-250 Aztec (N6645Y) from France to London with four additional team members aboard. All six were killed when it crashed and burned in heavy fog on Arkley Golf Course, 3 miles (5 km) short of the runway.

=== London Transport works ===
London Transport's Aldenham Works was sited on the edge of Elstree close to the A41; it was opened in 1956, closed in 1986, and demolished in 1996. It is now a large business park.

=== Elstree Grange ===
Originally a 19th-century steam ship owned by the Houlder Brothers, the town also lends its name to a series of ships called the Elstree Grange (rebuilt 1916, 1944, 1979), at one time sunk during the Second World War.

== Buildings ==
=== Grade II listed buildings ===
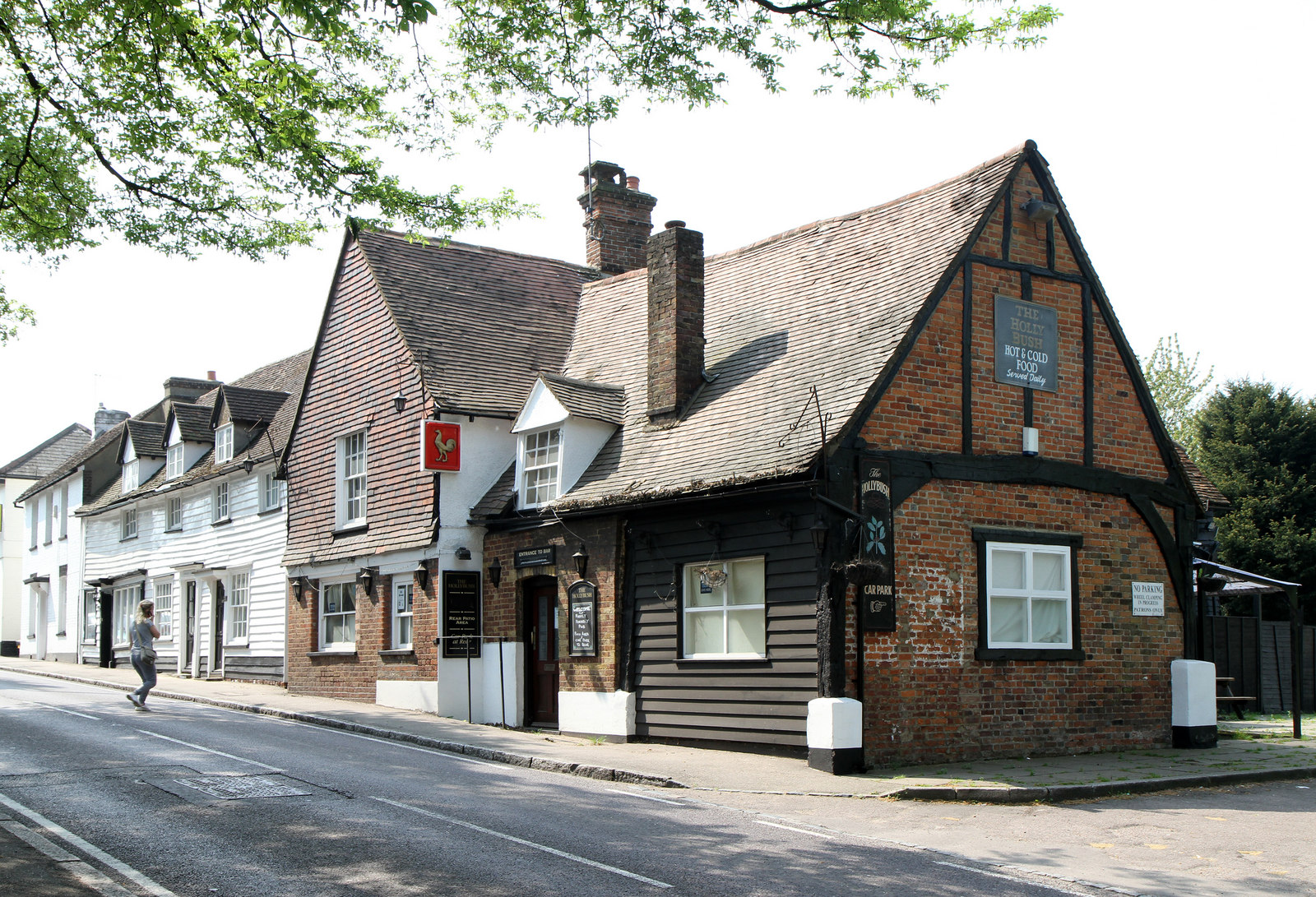
Holly Bush public house (15th century)

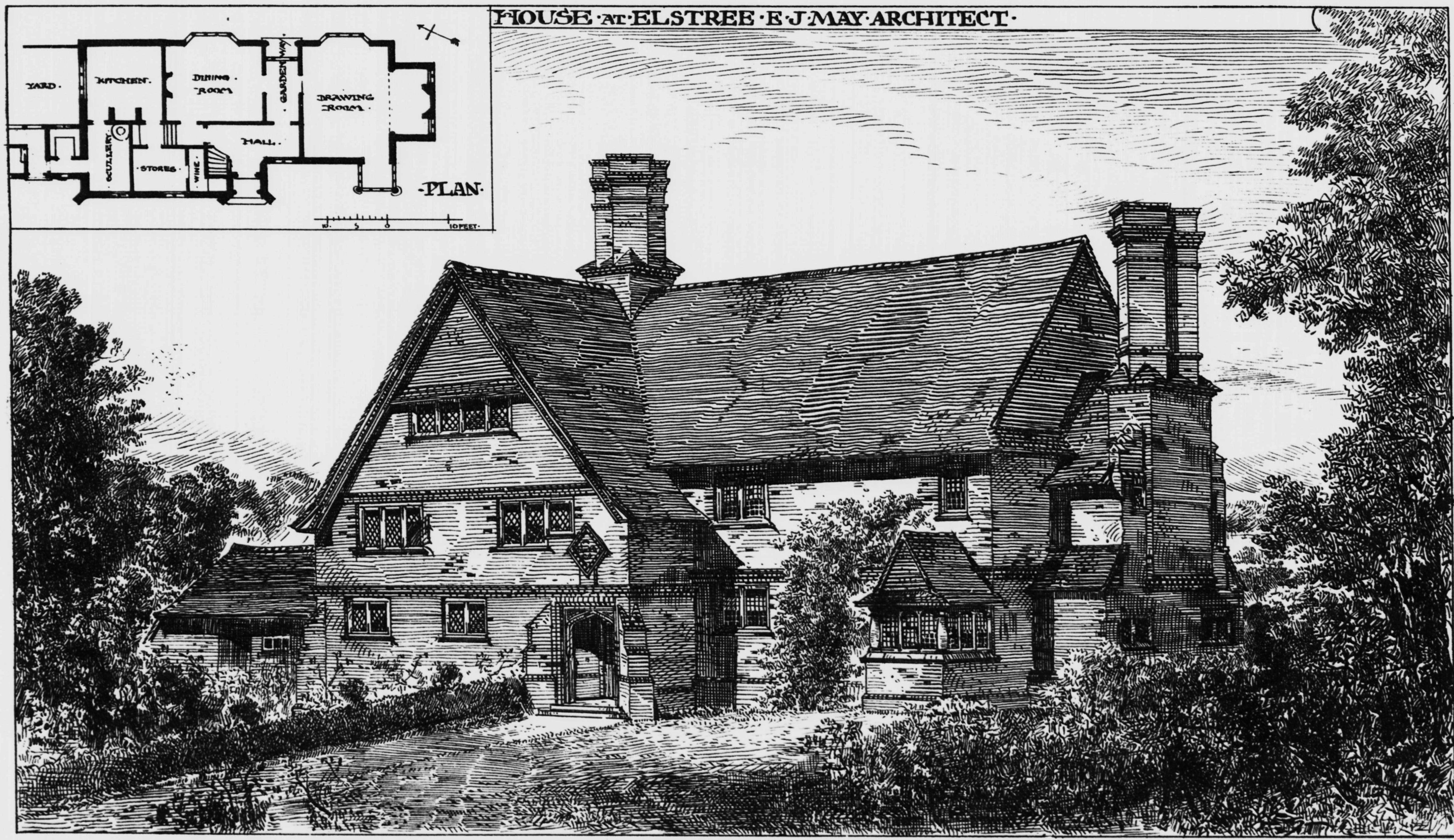
House at Elstree designed by E.J. May, and exhibited at the Royal Academy in 1887.

Elstree is home to a number of Grade II listed buildings, including some at Grade II* (particularly important buildings), such as:

- Holly Bush public house (15th century)
- Aldenham House and stable block (c.1672)
- The Leys, built in 1901 by Scottish architect and designer, George Henry Walton.

=== The Manor hotel ===
The Manor hotel, formerly known as the Edgwarebury Hotel, is located on Barnet Lane. The Tudor-style building dates back to 1540, was converted into a hotel in the 1960s, and has featured in many TV and film productions, such as the 1968 Hammer Horror classic, The Devil Rides Out. Notable guests have included Peter Sellers, Tom Cruise, John Cleese and Stanley Kubrick. It was the country home of armaments manufacturer and First Baronet Sir (Arthur) Trevor Dawson, (1866–1931).

=== Other buildings ===
A house in Elstree designed by architect Edward John May (1853–1941) was exhibited at the Royal Academy in 1887. St Nicholas Parish Church was designed by English architect Philip Charles Hardwick.

=== Schools ===
Elstree is home to Aldenham School, and Haberdashers' Boys' School, both independent public schools (ie. fee-paying), Haberdashers' School for Girls, and St Nicholas Church of England Primary School.

Just outside of Elstree, in the neighbouring town of Borehamwood, are a number of schools. There are Hertswood Academy and Elstree Screen Arts Academy, the vocational school linked with Elstree Studios.

There is also a Jewish high school called Yavneh College, Borehamwood. Yavneh was set up in 2013 by Dr Dena Coleman, ex-headteacher of Hasmonean High School. Dr Coleman was also a board-member of the Jewish National Fund. Just before her retirement in 2013, Dr Coleman died of meningitis. Yavneh College has subsequently been headed up by Spencer Lewis, ex-head teacher of King Solomon High School. The Yavneh Schools governors have also opened a primary school on the Hillside Avenue campuses.

=== Earlier schools ===
Since the 1780s, a private school has been located in Elstree.

Elstree School, a boys' preparatory school, was located in Elstree from 1848 until 1938 before moving to Woolhampton, Berkshire before the outbreak of the Second World War.

Hillside School was located in Elstree between 1874 and 1886, before eventually becoming Dorset House School in 1905, (not to be confused with Hillside School in nearby Borehamwood).

== Recreation ==
=== Sport ===
Elstree Cricket Club was formed in 1878, but no longer play in the Herts Saracens League. 18-hole Radlett Park Golf Club was founded in 1984, having recently being renamed from Elstree Golf & Country Club. It is closer to Elstree than Radlett.

Hatch End Cricket Club also play in Elstree. They participate in the Herts Saracens League.

=== Leisure ===
Section 15 of the London Outer Orbital Path (London Loop) goes through Elstree, before continuing as Section 16, a 10-mile (16 km) walk from Elstree to Cockfosters.

=== Synagogues ===
Elstree was home to Ohr Yisrael Synagogue, an Orthodox synagogue with affiliation to the Federation of Synagogues. However, the synagogue's present location is just within Borehamwood. The village currently sports two synagogues: The Shtiebel, an ultra-orthodox synagogue, and The Liberal Synagogue Elstree, just south of St. Nicholas' Church. According to census data, Elstree's population, including the Deacon's Hill area, was 36.0% Jewish, making it the only settlement with a Jewish plurality in the UK (the Christian population comprised 32.4% of the population). There are also two United Synagogue shuls in the area. One is on Croxdale Road and the other is at Yavneh College, Borehamwood.

=== Parks ===
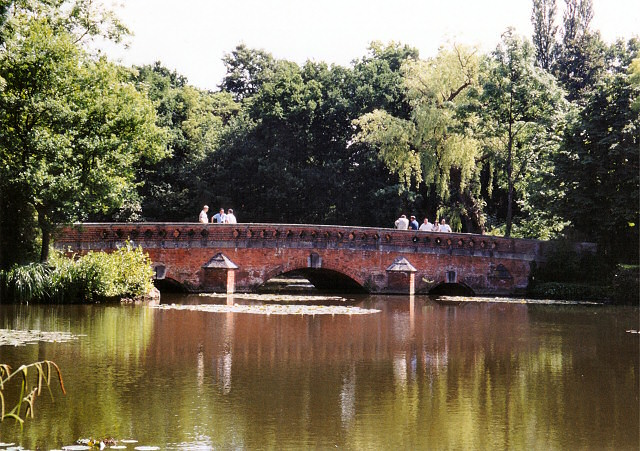
Tykes Water bridge

Aldenham Country Park is both a recreational facility and a breeding centre for rare livestock. Section 15 of the London Loop walk passes by. In 1873, nearby Tykes Water stream was dammed to create Tykes Water Lake. Tykes Water Bridge features in the open credits to the Peter Cushing and Christopher Lee film, Dracula A.D. 1972, and used in several episodes of the Diana Rigg and Linda Thorson seasons of The Avengers, including the final Thorson opening titles. It also features in the film Mosquito Squadron.

=== Elstree Reservoir ===
The dam was built in 1795 by French prisoners of war. English watercolour landscape painter John Hassell writes:

"At the top of Stanmore Hill we enter on Bushy Heath, and at some distance on the right in the valley catch a view of the celebrated reservoir, the property of the Grand Junction Company, on Aidenham Common, at the foot of the village of Elstree. This noble sheet of water occupies a space of considerable extent on the verge of Aidenham Common, which thirty years ago was a barren waste; here the improvements in agriculture are indeed conspicuous, for at this place a poor, sandy, meagre, wretched soil has now by good husbandry been converted into rich pasturage.
"The reservoir has all the appearance of a lake; and when the timber that surrounds it shall have arrived at maturity, it will be a most delightful spot. From this immense sheet of water, in event of drought or a deficiency of upland waters, the lower parts of the Grand Junction and the Paddington Canals can have an immediate supply. The feeder from this reservoir enters the main stream near Rickmansworth, above Batchworth Mills, and supplies the millers' below with 300 locks of water, to whose interest the Duke of Northumberland is a perpetual trustee."

In 1886, the Photographic Society of Great Britain featured an exhibition of photos of Elstree Reservoir by Edgar Clifton. During World War I, then Major Keith Caldwell with No. 74 Squadron RAF, used Elstree Reservoir for target practice. In 1918, one of the pilots accidentally killed a local resident when his machine gun misfired.

== Murders ==
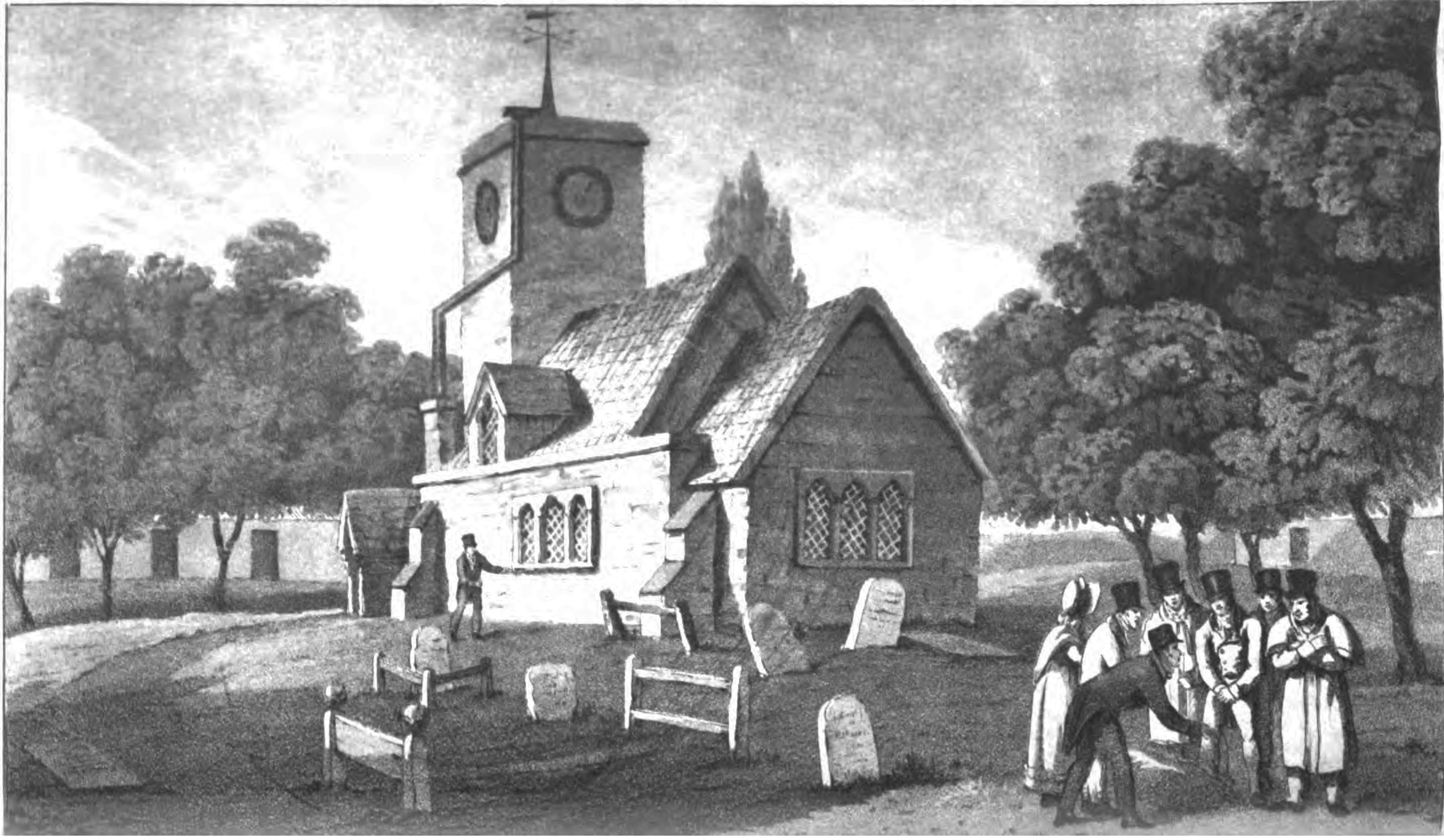
The burial of William Weare at the parish church in Elstree.

=== Martha Ray murder ===
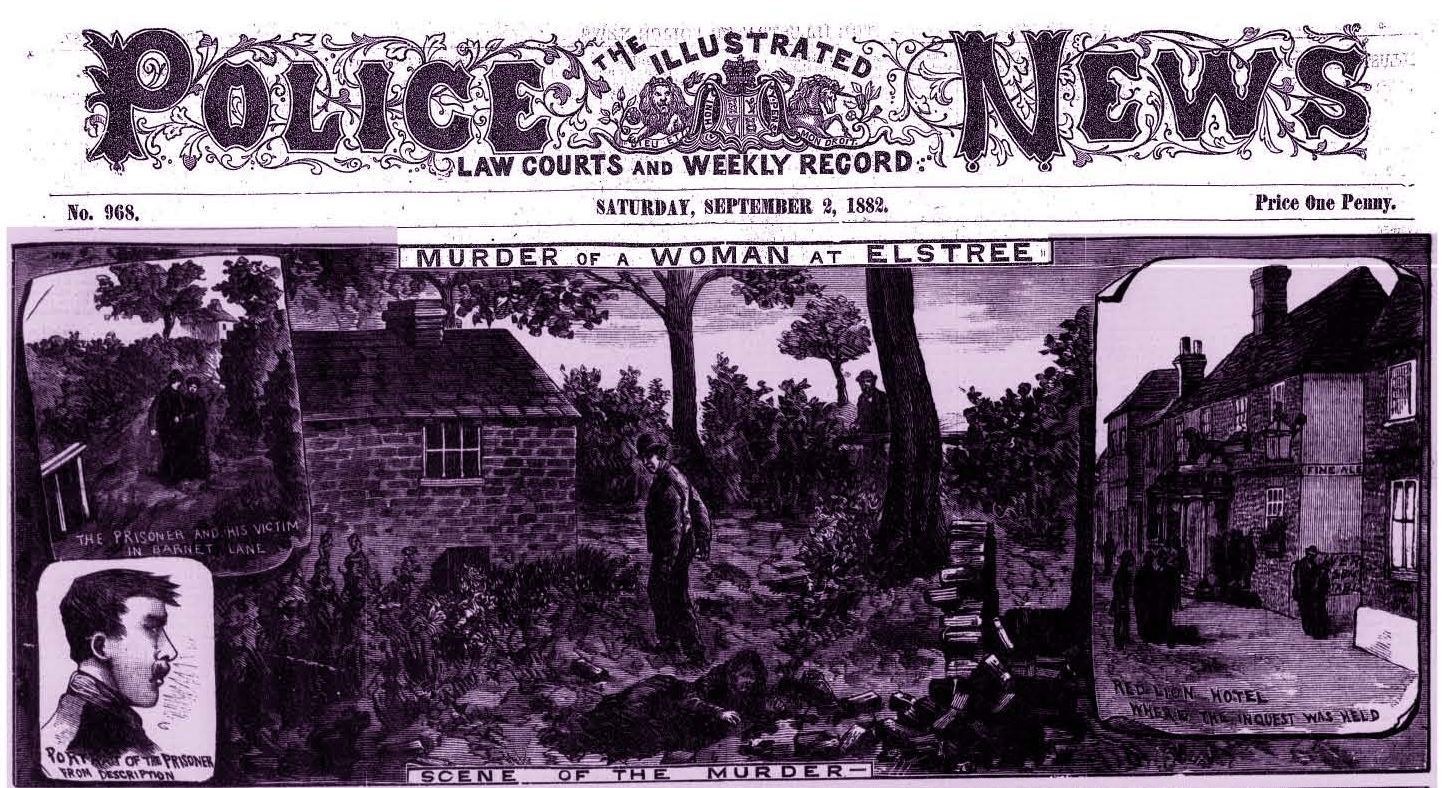
The Elstree Murder of Eliza Ebborn on 17 August 1882 by George Stratton, as illustrated in The Illustrated Police News Saturday, 11 November 1882

In 1779, Martha Ray (c. 1742–1779), singer and mistress of John Montagu, 4th Earl of Sandwich, was buried in the Parish Church (illustrated, right) after she had been shot dead by the Rev. James Hackman, Rector of Wiveton in Norfolk.

=== The Elstree murder of William Weare ===
In 1823, Elstree became notorious for the Elstree murder of William Weare, killed in Radlett and the body disposed of in a pond in Elstree by John Thurtell. The incident was recalled by Charles Dickens in his Weekly Journal. An inquest of the deceased was held on 31 October by county coroner Benjamin Rooke at the local Artichoke public house. He was likewise buried (funeral depicted) at the Parish Church.

=== The Elstree murder of Eliza Ebborn ===
On 17 August 1882, Eliza Ebborn of Watford was murdered by 24-year-old shoemaker George Stratton, who was subsequently sentenced to death. She was buried at Elstree Parish Church.

== Administrative districts ==
Elstree used to be divided between the counties of Hertfordshire and Middlesex. The north part (which included the parish of Elstree) lay in the Hundred of Cashio, also known as the Liberty of St Albans, while the south part lay in the Hundred of Gore. The county boundary ran along the road from Watford to Barnet, now called Barnet Lane.

=== Elstree Rural District ===
From 1941 to 1974, Elstree Rural District was the local government area, before being abolished and merged with Hertsmere. On 20 March 1957, Armorial Bearings were granted. The arms and crest are described as follows:

The background of royal ermine, represents the royal visits to and associations with the district, principally the visit of Henry VIII and his court to Tyttenhanger in 1525 to avoid the "sweatinge sicknesse" and the visits of Charles II to Salisbury Hall in Shenley. The oak tree with the Saxon crown represents Saxon Elstree – "Tidwulf's tree" – around which the district has grown. The tree also represents Boreham Wood and the district's woodlands, the gold acorns symbolize growth and prosperity. The waves at the base represent the River Colne, Aldenham Reservoir and link with the waves in the arms of the Hertfordshire CC and the Greater London Council.The gold saltire on blue is from the arms of the Abbey of St. Albans, the manor of Elstree came into the possession of the Abbey in 1188, and Tyttenhanger in Ridge stands on the site of a former possession of the Abbey, and the whole area lies in the Liberty of St. Albans. The scallop shells, the badge of pilgrims, recalls their passage along Watling Street through Elstree to St. Albans.
The hart is from one of the supporters of the County Council arms, wearing a mural crown, symbol of civic government. The spool of film (unique in civic heraldry) recalls the industry which had made the name of Elstree and Boreham Wood so widely known in modern times.
The motto is taken from the wall of Shenley Cage, and also links with the County motto "Trust and fear not". "

== Clubs, societies and organisations ==
- Elstree and Borehamwood History Society (inc. Elstree and Borehamwood Museum)
- Elstree, Borehamwood & Radlett mencap Society
- Elstree Golf & Country Club

== In popular culture ==
- Elstree is replicated as a part of one of three maps is based in the game Urban Dead. The "Borehamwood" map was released as part of the promotional campaign for the release of British writer Charlie Brooker's Dead Set.
- "Elstree" is also the title of a song about the film studio by the Buggles on their 1979 album The Age of Plastic.
- St. Nicholas Church in Elstree featured in an investigation of paranormal investigation.

== Notable residents ==
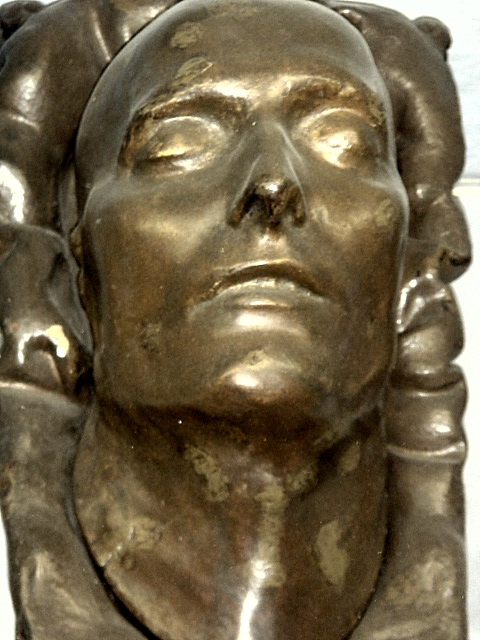
Napoleon's Death Mask, made in 1821 by Elstree resident, Francis Burton M.D., the uncle of explorer Richard Francis Burton

- John Baxter (1896–1975), film director and producer, lived at Aldahvu, Elstree
- Ephraim Beauchamp (d.1728) Baronet and lord of the Manor of Boreham in the parish of Elstree.
- Gerry Blattner (1913–1992 approx.), film producer and studio executive, lived at The Chantry, Barnet Lane, Elstree in the 1960s.
- Ludwig Blattner (1881–1935), film producer and studio owner, lived in Elstree from about 1928 until his suicide at Elstree Golf & Country Club.
- John Boyle (1563–1620), Church of Ireland Bishop of Cork, Rector of Elstree (before 1610).
- Ralph Terence St John-Brooks (1884–1963), bacteriologist, was stationed at the Lister Institute's National Collection of Type Cultures.
- Francis Burton M.D. (d.1828), uncle of Richard Francis Burton, military surgeon who made Napoleon's Death Mask, lived at Barham House, and is buried in Elstree parish church.
- Richard Francis Burton (1821–1890), explorer who lived at Barham House in Elstree when he was a child.
- George Byng, Esq. M.P. for Middlesex, resident of Elstree Manor.
- Rev. Philip Caraman (1911–1998), Jesuit, lived at The Grange on the corner of Allum Lane and Deacons Hill Road.
- Hussein Chalayan, fashion designer was brought up in The Rise
- Tom Chatto (1920–1982), actor, brought up in Elstree.
- Dame Harriette Chick (1875–1977), nutritionist, tested and bottled tetanus antitoxin for the army in 1915.
- Muzio Clementi (1752-1832), pianist, composer and businessman. He resided in Elstree from 1823 to 1828.
- Joan Collins, actress and author, lived in Barnet Lane, while married to Anthony Newley, singer, actor and film composer.
- Samuel Tertius Cowan (1905–1976), bacteriologist, curator of the National Collection of Type Cultures (NCTC) at the Lister Institute.
- Simon Cowell, American Idol and The X Factor judge, was brought up in Elstree.
- Sir (Arthur) Trevor Dawson, first baronet (1866–1931), armaments manufacturer, lived at Edgewarebury House.
- Colonel John Drinkwater, the historian of the Siege of Gibraltar, had his family seat at Palmer's Lodge, (now called Radnor Hall)
- Anthony Denny, Esq (1501–1549), resident of the Manor of Elstree.
- Sir Edward Denny (1796–1889) composer, resident of Manor of Elstree.
- James Elphinston (1721–1809) Scottish educator, moved to Elstree in 1792.
- Percy Everett (1870–1952), became the first Scoutmaster of the 1st Elstree Scout group on 13 March 1908, was Deputy Chief Scout for Great Britain, and lived at Schopwick Place in Elstree.
- Andrew Feldman (b. 1966), Conservative politician appointed to the Lords, known as Baron Feldman of Elstree.
- Cecil Ford (1913–1994) cricketer, was born in Elstree.
- Vicary Gibbs (1853–1932), genealogist and gardener, lived at Aldenham House.
- Lew Grade (1906–1998), TV producer given a life peerage, was known as Baron Grade of Elstree.
- Thomas Greenwood (1851–1908), public libraries promoter, died at Frith Knowl, Elstree.
- James Hackman (1752–1779), murderer of Martha Ray, was buried in Elstree Parish Church.
- Sir Harry Hague (1881–1960), managing director of A. Wander Ltd, the company who made Ovaltine, lived at The Chantry, Barnet Lane, Elstree.
- David Willis Wilson Henderson (1903–1968), immunologist, worked at the Lister Institute.
- Thomas Knox, 2nd Earl of Ranfurly M.P. (1786–1858) Member of Parliament (1820–1832) resided at Barham House, Elstree.
- Stanley Kubrick (1928-1999), film director. Lived on Barnet Lane.
- Sir John Charles Grant Ledingham (1875–1944), bacteriologist, worked at the Lister Institute.
- Paul Lester, music journalist.
- Ian Livingston, chief executive officer of BT Group.
- William Macready (1793–1873), actor, lived at Elm Place, Elstree.
- John Henry Marks (b. 1925) General Practitioner and Chairman of the British Medical Association, lived on Barnet Lane.
- Archer John Porter Martin (1910–2002), Nobel Prize winning biochemist, worked at the Lister Institute, and lived at Abbotsbury on Barnet Lane.
- Walter Thomas James Morgan (1900–2003), biochemist. worked at the Lister Institute.
- Air Vice-Marshal Sir David Munro, K.C.B., C.I.E., LL.D., M.B., F.R.C.S.Ed. (1878–1952)
- Anna Neagle and her film director husband Herbert Wilcox lived at the junction of Deacons Hill Road and Barnet Lane during her years as a film star.
- Richard Tauber, tenor, and his actress-wife Diana Napier lived at the Villa Capri from 1936 to 1940. It was later demolished to form a new residential development, called Tauber Close.
- Frank Podmore (1856–1910) author and founding member of the Fabian Society was born in Elstree.
- Martha Ray (c.1742–1779), singer murdered by James Hackman, buried in Elstree Parish Church.
- Horatio Sharpe (1718–1790), army officer and Proprietary Governor of Maryland, buried at Elstree Parish Church.
- Winston Smith, spaniel dog breeder.
- Henry Hurd Swinnerton (1875–1966), zoologist and geologist, lived and died at the Headmaster's House, Haberdashers' Aske's School.
- James Booker Blakemore Wellington (1858–1939) photographer, died in Elstree in 1939.
- James West, Esq. MP for St Albans, resident of Elstree Manor.
- Jeremiah White (1629–1707), nonconformist minister, preached at Elstree in 1669.

== Climate ==
Climate data for Elstree
Month	Jan	Feb	Mar	Apr	May	Jun	Jul	Aug	Sep	Oct	Nov	Dec	Year
Mean daily maximum °C (°F)	6 (43)	7 (45)	9 (48)	12 (54)	16 (61)	18 (64)	22 (72)	22 (72)	18 (64)	14 (57)	9 (48)	7 (45)	13 (56)
Mean daily minimum °C (°F)	1 (34)	1 (34)	2 (36)	4 (39)	6 (43)	9 (48)	11 (52)	11 (52)	10 (50)	7 (45)	3 (37)	2 (36)	6 (42)
Average precipitation mm (inches)	69.6 (2.74)	47.2 (1.86)	54.1 (2.13)	53.1 (2.09)	49.8 (1.96)	60.5 (2.38)	41.1 (1.62)	53.6 (2.11)	61.0 (2.40)	74.4 (2.93)	66.0 (2.60)	67.6 (2.66)	698 (27.48)
Source: Monthly averages for Borehamwood, United Kingdom The Weather Channel. Retrieved 15 October 2011

== Bibliography ==
=== Books ===
- Richard Riding and Grant Peerless, Elstree Aerodrome: The Past in Pictures, The History Press Ltd (26 November 2003), ISBN 0-7509-3412-3, ISBN 978-0-7509-3412-1, 192 pages.
- Robert Bard, Elstree and Borehamwood Past, Publisher: Phillimore & Company, Limited, 2006, ISBN 1-905286-11-2, ISBN 978-1-905286-11-9, 128 pages
- Stephen A. Castle, William Brooks, The Book of Elstree & Boreham Wood, Publisher: Barracuda Press, 1988, ISBN 0-86023-406-1, ISBN 978-0-86023-406-7, 136 pages
- G. R. T. Eales, A Lecture on the history of Elstree, Publisher: Scott, Greenwood & Son, 1922
- Anthony Frewin, John Mansbridge, Elstree & Boreham Wood through two thousand years, Publisher: Ann and Lionel Leventhal, 1974, ISBN 0-9503822-0-5, ISBN 978-0-9503822-0-3, 47 pages.
- Paul Welsh, Elstree and Borehamwood in Old Picture Postcards, ISBN 90-288-3013-8, ISBN 978-90-288-3013-4, 80 pages.
- J. Roy Avery, The Elstree murder, Publisher: Haberdasher's Aske's School, 1963, 19 pages.
- Thomas Burke, Murder at Elstree: or, Mr. Thurtell and his gig, Publisher: Longmans, Green and co., 1936, 177 pages
- Elstree Rural District: official guide, Forward Publicity Limited, Edition 9, illustrated, Publisher: Home Pub., 1972. ISBN 0-7174-0233-9, ISBN 978-0-7174-0233-5. 72 pages.
- William Hawtayne, A sermon preach'd at Elstree in Hertfordshire, on the twentieth of January 1714. Mr. Hawtayne's thanksgiving-sermon on 20 January 1714. Printed for Tim Goodwin. 20 pages.
- Franklyn de Winton Lushington, Sermons to young boys delivered at Elstree school, Publ. 1898. Republished Kessinger Publishing LLC 2010. ISBN 1-166-95208-8, ISBN 978-1-166-95208-2.
- The first register book of the parish church of Elstree, 1655–1757, Translated by Arthur R. T. Eales, publisher: pr.by Coombes, 1914, 76 pages.
- I. C. M. Sanderson, A history of Elstree School and three generations of the Sanderson family, Publisher Elstree School, 1978.
- John Hill, Hertfordshire Militia Lists: Elstree & Shenley, Issue ML 102 of Militia Series, Publ. Hertfordshire Family & Population History Society, 2000, ISBN 1-903245-06-0, ISBN 978-1-903245-06-4, 13 pages
- An Illustrated Guide to the Elstree Country Club, Elstree, Herts, publ. Elstree Country Club, 1950, 12 pages. (at the British Library). Retrieved 22 September 2011.

=== Journals ===
- "Medieval Pottery From Elstree, Otterspool & Prehsi", Academic Journal Offprint From St. Albans Architectural And Archaeological Society Transactions (1961)
- Renn, Derek F, "Further finds of medieval pottery from Elstree: with a survey of unglazed thumb-pressed jugs", Hertfordshire Archaeology 1968, pp. 124–7
- Stephen Castle and Michael Hammerons, "Excavations Elstree, Middlesex, 1974-6". At Archaeology Data Service Website. Retrieved 22 September 2011
