= Yavneh College =

Yavneh College may refer to either:

- Leibler Yavneh College in Melbourne, Australia
- Yavneh College, Borehamwood, England
