= Cecil Ford =

English cricketer

Personal information
- Full name: Cecil William Ford
- Born: 20 April 1913; Elstree, Hertfordshire, England
- Died: 11 July 1994 (aged 81); Wellington, Somerset, England
- Batting: Right-handed
- Bowling: Right-arm medium-fast

Domestic team information
- Years: Team
- 1946–1947: Devon
- 1936: Minor Counties
- 1932–1939: Hertfordshire

Career statistics
Competition	First-class
Matches	1
Runs scored	5
Batting average	2.50
100s/50s	–/–
Top score	3
Balls bowled	48
Wickets	–
Bowling average	–
5 wickets in innings	–
10 wickets in match	–
Best bowling	–
Catches/stumpings	1/–
- Source: Cricinfo, 14 February 2011

Cecil William Ford (20 April 1913 – 11 July 1994) was an English cricketer. Ford was a right-handed batsman who bowled right-arm medium-fast. He was born in Elstree, Hertfordshire.

Ford first played for Hertfordshire in the 1932 Minor Counties Championship against Buckinghamshire. From 1932 to 1939, he represented the county in 52 Championship matches, the last of which came against Berkshire. His career with Hertfordshire was cut short by World War II. In 1936, Ford played his only first-class match when he represented a combined Minor Counties team against the touring Indians at Lord's. In this match he scored 2 runs in the Minor Counties first-innings before being dismissed by Amar Singh. In their second-innings he scored 3 runs before being dismissed by the same bowler.

Following the Second World War, Ford joined Devon. He made his debut for the county against Cornwall in the 1946 Minor Counties Championship. Ford played for Devon in the 1946 and 1947 seasons, playing 14 Championship matches, the last of which came against Cornwall.

He died in Wellington, Somerset on 11 July 1994.
