= E. J. Lowe (philosopher) =

British philosopher and academic

- Born: Edward Jonathan Lowe; 24 March 1950; Dover, England
- Died: 5 January 2014 (aged 63)
- Children: 2

Education
- Education: Fitzwilliam College, Cambridge (BA, 1971); St Edmund Hall, Oxford (BPhil, 1974; DPhil, 1975)
- Theses: Induction and Non-Demonstrative Inference (1974); Induction and Causal Inference (1975)
- Doctoral advisor: Simon Blackburn
- Other advisor: Rom Harré (BPhil thesis advisor)

Philosophical work
- Era: Contemporary philosophy
- Region: Western philosophy
- School: Analytic; Neo-Aristotelianism
- Institutions: Durham University
- Main interests: Metaphysics, philosophy of mind, philosophical logic
- Notable ideas: Dualistic interactionism, non-Cartesian substance dualism, four-category ontology

Edward Jonathan Lowe (/loʊ/; 24 March 1950 – 5 January 2014), usually cited as E. J. Lowe but known personally as Jonathan Lowe, was a British philosopher and academic. He was Professor of Philosophy at Durham University. He defended non-Cartesian dualism.

== Biography ==
Lowe was born in Dover, England. His secondary education was at Bushey Grammar School, and he subsequently studied at the University of Cambridge, 1968–72 (BA in History, 1st Class), and the University of Oxford, 1972–75 (BPhil and DPhil in Philosophy).

Lowe had two children; his daughter is the political philosopher Rebecca Lowe.

== Philosophy ==
Lowe was one of the leading philosophers of his generation. He researched and published on a vast array of topics including: metaphysics, philosophy of mind, philosophical logic, philosophy of language, philosophy of religion, and the history of early modern philosophy. He supervised many PhD students, working on a wide variety of topics.

He made notable contributions to developing thought on ontology, essences, dualistic interactionism, and Locke studies. For Lowe, ontology comes in two parts: a priori and empirical. The a priori aspect deals in the possible ways reality could exist. The empirical aspect informs and establish what kinds of things do exist. Thus, to grasp what is actual in the world you must also ascertain was it possible. At the heart of his ontological world is a four-category ontology which consist of objects, kinds, attributes, and modes. Key to his neo-Aristotelianism is a commitment to essences. He espouses general essences and individual essences. The view follows in the Aristotelian tradition that an essence is 'what it is' to be a substance. His work on Locke offers a charitable reading of the philosopher, and defends Locke's relevance to philosophy today.

=== The four-category ontology ===
Lowe's four-category ontology takes inspiration from Aristotle's Categories. His terminology emerges from the distinction that Aristotle made between 'being said of' and 'being in' a subject: primary substances, secondary substances, attributes, and modes. Primary substances are neither said of nor are in a subject. Secondary are said of a subject, not being in. His own addition is to label the final two categories, attributes and modes. Attributes are both said of and are in, while modes are not said of a subject, but are in. Attributes and modes are his own additions to Aristotle's language. Rather than 'being said of' or 'being in,' Lowe introduces two distinctions: substantial and non-substantial; universals and particulars. Thus, there are substantial particulars (objects), substantial universals (kinds), non-substantial universals (attributes), and non-substantial particulars (modes). He argues that the distinction between kinds and modes are similar to the kind of distinction made between sortal and adjectival terms.

The former denotes kinds of object, while the latter denotes properties of objects. Individual objects are particular instances of kinds, while the modes of individual objects are particular instances of properties.

The categories and their relations are laid out in the 'ontological square.'

Lowe argues that his view has an advantage over other ontologies of universals like that of David Armstrong. That is, it does not need to rely on appeals to second-order relations. Consider the law-statement, 'Planets move in elliptical orbits.' Lowe claims, according to a theory like Armstrong's, a second-order necessitation relation obtains between the first-order properties: being a planet and moving in an elliptical orbit. Instead, the four-category ontology would state that the law amounts to the attribute, moving in an elliptical orbit, characterizing the kind, planet.

A further advantage is in the accounts ability to distinguish between dispositional and occurrent states of objects. For example, the distinction between an object being soluble and its actually dissolving. Where counterfactuals need a covering claim, "all things being equal," the four-category ontology can capture the dispositions through kinds and objects.

An object possesses a disposition to F just in case it instantiates a kind which is characterized by the property of being F. Thus, for example, an object O has a disposition to be dissolved by water just in case O instantiates a kind, K, such that the law obtains that water dissolves K.

The modes and attributes capture the object actually dissolving by their relation to the universal of the object. For Lowe, modes are features of an object, not constituent of it. Here, modes are particular ways an object is. Thus, an object may exemplify attributes dispositionally or occurrently. It exemplifies attributes dispositionally if the object instantiates the kind which is characterized by the attribute. It exemplifies attribute occurrently if the object is characterized by a mode which instantiates the attribute.

=== Essences ===
A central aspect of Lowe's metaphysics is his view of essences. Put simply, essences are 'what it is' to be that object. Each object has two kinds of essences: general essences and individual essences. General essences are 'what it is' to be that object, and is shared by all the particulars of that object. Individual essences capture 'what it is' to be a particular object as opposed to some other. For Lowe, essences are not some particular thing you need to find. For example, H_{2}O as the essence of water. Rather, you simply need to 'grasp' what it is to be that substance. The bar he uses for grasping an essence is obtaining an "adequate conception" of it.

=== Non-Cartesian dualism ===
Lowe defended non-Cartesian dualism. Non-Cartesian substance dualism (NCSD) is a type of dualism of persons and their organized bodies, wherein persons though distinct from their organized bodies are bearers of both mental properties and certain physical properties.

Lowe defined non-Cartesian substance dualism as:

Non-Cartesian substance dualism is a position in the philosophy of mind concerning the nature of the mind-body relation—or, more exactly, the person-body relation. It maintains that this is a relationship between two distinct, but not necessary separable, individual substances, in the sense of 'individual substance' according to which this term denotes a persisting, concrete object or bearer of properties, capable of undergoing change in respect of at least some of those properties as time passes. When such an object undergoes such a change, it undergoes a change of state, for a state of an object consists in its possession of some property at a time, or during a period of time.

== Death ==
Lowe died after several months of illness on 5 January 2014.

== Selected publications ==
- Kinds of Being: A Study of Individuation, Identity and the Logic of Sortal Terms (Oxford: Blackwell, 1989)
- Locke on Human Understanding (London: Routledge, 1995)
- Subjects of Experience (Cambridge: Cambridge University Press, 1996)
- The Possibility of Metaphysics (Oxford: Oxford University Press, 1998)
- An Introduction to the Philosophy of Mind (Cambridge: Cambridge University Press, 2000)
- A Survey of Metaphysics (Oxford: Oxford University Press, 2002)
- Locke (London, New York: Routledge: 2005)
- The Four-Category Ontology: A Metaphysical Foundation for Natural Science (Oxford: Oxford University Press, 2006)
- Personal Agency (Oxford: Oxford University Press, 2007)
- More Kinds of Being: A Further Study of Individuation, Identity and the Logic of Sortal Terms (Wiley-Blackwell, 2009)
- Forms of Thought: A Study in Philosophical Logic (Cambridge University Press, 2013)

He also published over 200 articles, including in the leading journals in the field, such as The Journal of Philosophy, Mind, and Noûs.
