= National Collection of Type Cultures =

Microbiological culture collection in the UK

- Established: 1920
- Location: United Kingdom
- Parent organization: UK Health Security Agency
- Website: Official website

National Collection of Type Cultures (NCTC) is one of the four culture collections that constitute the Culture Collections operated by the UK Health Security Agency. It is a non-profit culture collection repository located in the UK. NCTC maintains over 5100 bacterial cultures, over 100 Mycoplasmas and more than 500 plasmids, host strains, bacteriophages, and transposons. Of these, 150 strains are available from NCTC in the form of bacterial DNA, supplied at 2 μg, making them suitable for whole genome sequencing amongst other molecular applications. The cultures represent bacteria from widespread geographical locations and are transported in fused-glass ampoules.

The NCTC was founded in 1920 with John Charles Grant Ledingham, who was previously chief bacteriologist at the Lister Institute, serving as its first director. The Lister Institute, along with the Medical Research Council, oversaw the founding of the collection. The first strain to be added to the collection—termed NCTC1—was an isolate of Shigella flexneri, a causative agent of bacillary dysentery, cultured in 1915 from a man believed to have been a British soldier in the First World War. Mabel Rhodes, the first assistant curator of the NCTC, recounted that the collection's initial premises at the Lister Institute "contained nothing but a telephone" and that bacteriological equipment had to be borrowed from other departments. Safety protocols at the time were poor, and during the early years of the organisation three staff members contracted tularemia.

Bacterial strains were initially provided free of charge and were transported live on an agar medium. In five years' time, the collection had grown from about 200 strains acquired from the Lister Institute to over 1500. In 1939, the NCTC moved from the Lister Institute building in Chelsea, London to a small farmhouse in Elstree, Hertfordshire; ten years later, the collection moved to the Central Public Health Laboratory in Colindale, London, where the mass production of lyophilized cultures began. A plasmid collection was established in 1985.
