= Deacon's Hill =

Area of Elstree, Hertfordshire, England

Coordinates: 51°38′40″N 00°16′50″W

Deacon's Hill is an area of Elstree, Hertfordshire, England. It is the part of the town which lies to the immediate west of the railway line and is informally known as being part of Elstree by its residents, even though it is geographically separate from the village of that name. Deacon's Hill includes a residential area and the Deacon's Hill open space.

The main road through the area is Allum Lane which connects Borehamwood with Elstree village.
