= Nascot Wood =

Area of Watford, England

Nascot Wood is the colloquial name for the largely residential area of Watford (Hertfordshire) that is located to the north-west of the town centre. The area has a relatively large number of mature trees, which help give it more of a leafy character than some other parts of the town. The name relates to one of the main roads in the area - Nascot Wood Road, and the local administrative ward - Nascot. The boundaries of the area are formed by the railway tunnels to the east and Hempstead Road to the west - beyond which is the Cassiobury Estate.

The Industrial Revolution brought the Grand Junction Canal (now Grand Union Canal) in 1798 and the London and Birmingham Railway in 1837, both located here for the same reasons the road had followed centuries before, seeking an easy gradient over the Chiltern Hills." (source Wikipedia page Watford) The first railway station in Watford opened here in 1837.

The railway company's aim of keeping their building costs down was disrupted by resistance from the Earl of Essex (Cassiobury) and Clarendon (The Grove). They had permitted the canal to be built through their estates, but they resisted the passage of a steam railway through their land.

The railway company was forced to build an expensive tunnel, which starts in Nascot Wood and emerges close to Kings Langley station. After the spoil heaps settled, from building the tunnel, the woodland grew back. The area also contains some ancient woodland in amongst housing from the late 19th-early 21st century housing.

== See also ==
- Watford
- Cassiobury Park
