= Bushey Meads School =

Location
- Coldharbour Lane; Bushey, Hertfordshire, WD23 4PA; England; 51.649°N 0.349°W

Information
- Type: Academy
- Motto: Aspire to Achieve
- Established: 1957
- Department for Education URN: 137872 Tables
- Ofsted: Reports
- Chair of Governors: Di Hoeksma
- Head teacher: Jeremy Turner (Executive Principal – Bushey St James Trust)
- Gender: Coeducational
- Age: 11 to 18
- Enrolment: 1251
- Houses: Sycamore; Ash; Willow; Elm; Oak; Maple; Beech
- Colour: Green
- Website: busheymeads.org.uk

Bushey Meads School (also known as "BMS") is a coeducational secondary school and sixth form with academy status, located in Bushey, Hertfordshire, England. The school forms part of the Bushey St James Trust, in partnership with Little Reddings Primary School and Hartsbourne Primary School.

== History ==
The school was founded in 1957 as Bushey Secondary Modern School with a building designed for 636 pupils.

In 1998 Dr Dena Coleman became the head teacher at Bushey Meads School. The school had a budget of about £3m and it had over 1,000 secondary and sixth form pupils. It had become grant-maintained to balance its budgets but money was tight. The school suffered from small classrooms. Coleman was head of the school until 2005.

The school celebrated its 50th anniversary by taking a major role in the annual Bushey Carnival in 2007, basing some events on the history and successes of the school.

The name Bushey Meads derives from the original surrounding area. The site where the school buildings now stand was once mostly fields ("meads", from Old English mæd) surrounding the then small village of Bushey.

The school has been featured in TV programmes including Grange Hill.

== Notable former pupils ==
- Charlie Goode – footballer
- George Michael – musician
- Simon Phillips – musician
- Andrew Ridgeley – musician
- Matthew Stephens – cyclist
- Emily Staveley-Taylor – singer/actress The Staves
- Modestas Bukauskas – UFC
- Clare Cordell – singer/actress The Voice UK
