= Dena Coleman =

Dr. Dena Coleman
- Born: Dena Friedman; 7 September 1952; Islington, England
- Died: 18 June 2013 (aged 60); Bournemouth, England
- Occupation: Headteacher
- Known for: Founding Yavneh College, Borehamwood
- Spouse: Gordon Coleman

Dena Coleman (née Dena Friedman; 7 September 1952 – June 2013) was a headteacher. She was a board member of the Jewish National Fund in the United Kingdom and founding head of Yavneh College, Borehamwood.

== Life ==
She was born in Islington, on 7 September 1952. She was the first child of Muriel Amelia Rachel, born Kovler and Norman Friedman. Her father made handbags. She would have two younger brothers.

In 1991 she wrote Science, religion and the London School Board: aspects of the life and work of John Hall Gladstone (1827–1902) which was published by the University of London.

In 1998 she became the head teacher at Bushey Meads School. This was a >1,000 secondary and sixth form school in Watford that had become grant-maintained to balance its budgets. The school had been built for 636 pupils and suffered from small classrooms. She was at Bushey Meads until 2005. She went on to be head of Hasmonean High School which was two Jewish secondary schools, a boys and a girls, operating as one in Barnet. In 2002, she and Richard Gold who was a solicitor published Running a school 2002/03: legal duties and responsibilities. She was at Hasmonean until 2005.

Yavneh College, Borehamwood was established in 2006 with a new campus designed for 1,000 pupils. Coleman became its founding head.

She was a board member of JNF UK which raises funds for Israel. In 2009, she and her husband Gordon went to court over their religious rights as Orthodox Jews. They owned a flat in Bournemouth and the owners had recently installed an automatic hallway light. The light was welcomed by some residents but Orthodox Jews are not permitted to switch on lights on Jewish holidays, so they found themselves unable to use the hallway without switching on the light.

Coleman died of meningitis in June 2013, 6 weeks before her planned retirement. Tributes included one from the Chief Rabbi, Lord Sacks, who noted her idea that “Every child is good at something and it’s our job to find out what that is.”

A sports hall at the Gevim School in Beersheba was dedicated in her memory in Israel in 2015, although the original ceremony the year before had to be postponed because of a rocket attack.
