= Queens' School =

Location
- Aldenham Road; Bushey, Hertfordshire, WD23 2TY; England; 51.6583°N 0.3686°W

Information
- Type: Academy
- Motto: Dare to be Great
- Established: 1969
- Specialists: Science and sports
- Department for Education URN: 136877 Tables
- Ofsted: Reports
- Head teacher: Jonathan Morrell
- Gender: Mixed
- Age: 11 to 18
- Enrolment: 1700
- Houses: Turing; Franklin; Attenborough; Seacole
- Publication: The Q
- Website: https://www.queens.herts.sch.uk/

Queens' School, near Watford, Hertfordshire, in England, is a partially selective secondary school and sixth form with academy status. It currently is a specialist science and sports college.

== History ==
The story of Queens' began with two schools in Watford in the early 20th century.

Watford Central School was founded in 1912 in buildings in Derby Road vacated by Watford Grammar School for Boys when it moved to its present site in West Watford. In 1950, the central school became a new grammar school on the northwest side of Aldenham Road, Bushey, called Bushey Grammar School. The buildings vacated in Derby Road were then occupied by the Central Primary School.

Alexandra School was founded in 1901 in Judge Street, North Watford. These buildings later became an annexe to the Watford School of Art. In January 1966, the school moved to the southeast side of Aldenham Road, opposite Bushey Grammar School. The pedestrian underpass under Aldenham Road was built at this time, but the two schools had little interaction. Alexandra School had only three headmasters in its 68-year history.

In September 1969, the two schools were amalgamated to form Queens' School, a comprehensive school spanning a 52-acre (21 ha) site on both sides of Aldenham Road. At the time of the merger, Bushey Grammar had 800 pupils, while Alexandra School had 500 students. A crucial early decision was to extend the pastoral system of Bushey Grammar to the new school, with four houses spanning all year groups, two based on each side of Aldenham Road. This structure has served the school well and persists to this day.

Grange Park School closed in September 1988, and its pupils transferred to Queens'. The former Grange Park campus became home to Bushey Hall School (now The Grange Academy).

Queens' was awarded grant-maintained status in April 1993 and became a foundation school in September 1999. In September 2003, the school was designated a Specialist Sports College, and in April 2008 it also became a Science College.

In July 2011, Queens' converted to academy status. The school has four houses: Attenborough (yellow), Franklin (green), Turing (red), and Seacole (blue).

== Location ==
The school occupies a relatively isolated suburban campus on both sides of Aldenham Road, in Bushey on the outskirts of Watford in south Hertfordshire. As an amalgamation of two schools, Queens' has two sites - named North and South - linked by an underpass. The north side (the former Bushey Grammar site) borders the Bushey Grove Leisure Centre and the Purcell School of Music (formerly the Royal Caledonian School), whereas the south side (the former Alexandra School site) borders the Metropolitan Police sports grounds as well as a Powerleague site accessed through the school car park.

== Admissions ==
Queens' is a partially selective school, selecting 35% of its intake on academic ability, 5% on aptitude for music and 5% on aptitude for sport.

The remaining places are allocated to siblings of current pupils and to applicants living nearest to the school.

The catchment area for selective places extends approximately 7 miles (11 km) from the school: in addition to southwest Hertfordshire, it includes some northern parts of the London Borough of Harrow.

However 95% of children admitted live within 3 miles (5 km) of the school.

The school is the largest in Hertfordshire.

== Houses ==
The school is split into four houses: Turing and Franklin (formerly Newton and Drake) based on the north side and Attenborough and Seacole (formerly Auden and Sutherland) based on the south. Students are allocated a house on entry. Each house is typically further subdivided into two or three forms for each year group. Each house has associated colours, which are displayed on ties and school crests as part of the school uniform.

There is a strong identity among students with their house. This was created through inter-house competitions on sports day, a yearly music competition and various other sports related competition throughout the academic year. Formerly, each house had both a Head of House and Deputy Head of House, as well as an assistant head of house, who assisted with students pastoral care and helped get to the root of discipline problems rather than simply giving a student a detention. As of 2020, these responsibilities are now handled by Heads of Year. Also there is a friendly rivalry between houses, which adds to the atmosphere of the school.

The House system was praised by the last Ofsted report in September 2006. The house system splits the large school into four smaller groups.

== Academic performance ==
At both GCSE and A-level, pupils at Queens' School regularly achieve examination results significantly above the national average. In recent cohorts, 70% of A-level entries achieved grades A* to B, while 40% attained A* or A grades.

Following a full inspection in March 2025, Ofsted graded the school as 'Outstanding' across all five assessed categories, specifically highlighting the quality of education and the sixth-form provision.

== Scholastic and sporting achievements ==
- National Debating champions in 2005 and 2007
- English National Golf Champions 2007
- English Schools FA (ESFA) U19 Football Champions 2008
- English Schools FA (ESFA) U13 Football Runners up 2008
- English Schools FA (ESFA) U14 Football Runners up 2009
- Reached 3 English Schools FA (ESFA) Finals 2011

The school won the 2009 Sports Colleges Award for Innovation for development of a virtual learning environment (VLE).

Discipline Queens school's disciplinary system works on stages. If a student is disruptive in class or any other minor offences, they will be given a reminder. If they continue, they will be given a warning. A message will be sent to the parents. If they still continue, they will be given an afterschool detention. Depending on the offence, it will be 30 mins or 1hr.

== Notable former pupils ==
- Mark Oaten, politician, Lib Dem MP from 1997 to 2010 for Winchester
- Kenny Jackett, football manager
- Jonathan Lemon, cartoonist and musician
- Sean Murray, footballer for Dundalk
- Gavin Massey, footballer for Wigan Athletic
- Will Norris, goalkeeper for Burnley
- Alan Bailey, SVP & Treasurer for Paramount Pictures
- Dion Pereira, professional footballer

=== Bushey Grammar School ===
- Ann Coffey, Labour MP since 1992 for Stockport
- Terry Johnson, playwright, theatre producer/director
- E. J. Lowe, Professor of Philosophy, Durham University
