= Yavneh College, Borehamwood =

Yavneh College
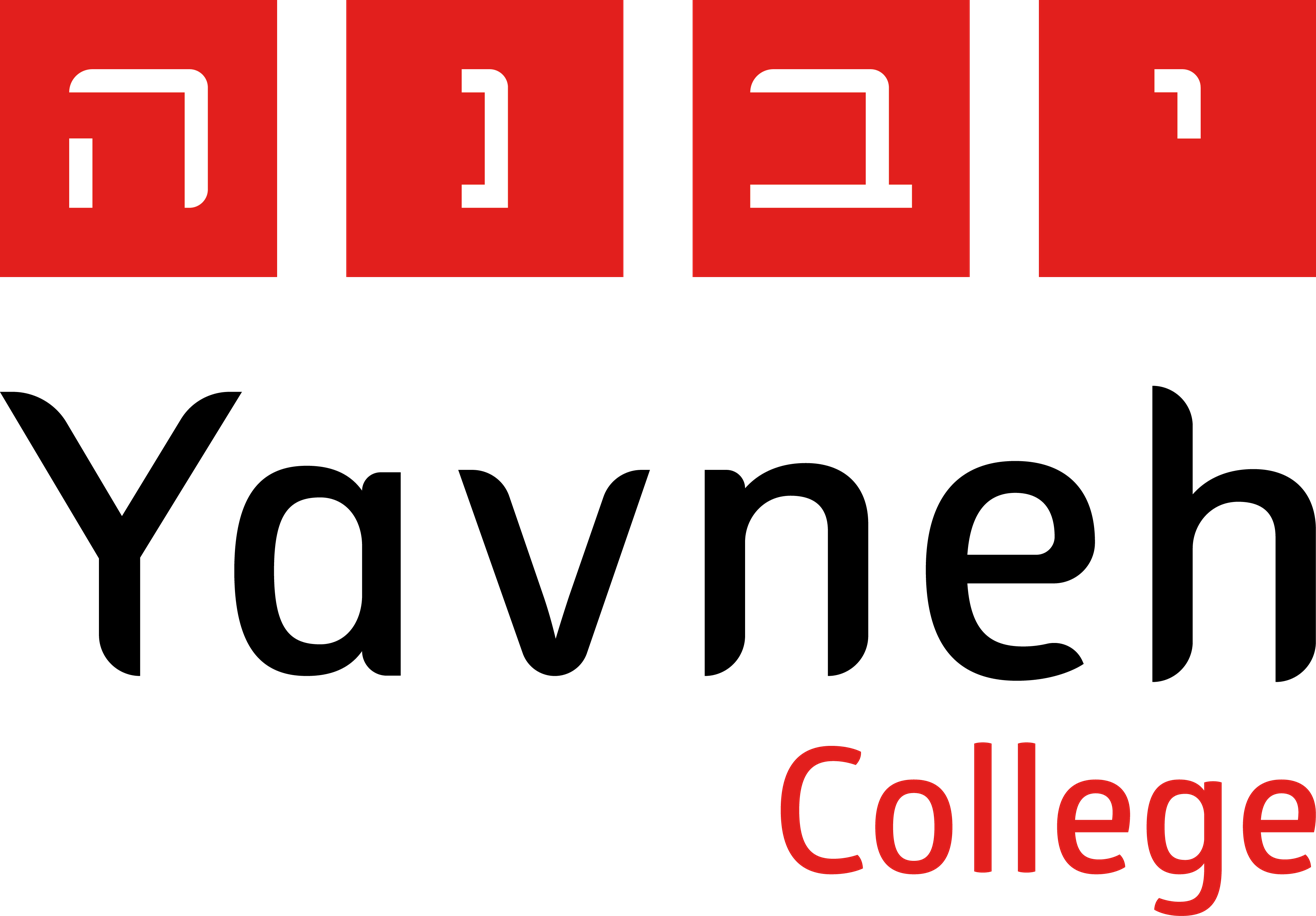
- The school logo

Location
- Hillside Avenue; Borehamwood, Hertfordshire, WD6 1HL; England; 51°39′15″N 0°16′06″W

Information
- Type: Academy
- Motto: "A world built on kindness ."
- Religious affiliation: Modern Orthodox Judaism
- Established: 2006
- Founder: Dena Coleman
- Local authority: Hertfordshire
- Department for Education URN: 136922 Tables
- Ofsted: Reports
- Chair: Sue Nyman
- Executive Headteacher: Spencer Lewis
- Gender: Coeducational
- Age: 11 to 18
- Enrolment: 1052
- Houses: Achva, Hoda'ah, Orah, Shalva, Yedidya.
- Colours: Red and Black
- Website: http://www.yavnehcollege.org/

Yavneh College is a co-educational, Jewish, secondary and sixth form school in the town of Borehamwood, in southern Hertfordshire, England. A comprehensive with five-form entry for ages 11–18 yrs, it is part of the Yavneh College Academy Trust.

== History ==
When founded, the school was led by headteacher Dr. Dena Coleman, who died in June 2013 just a few weeks before her planned retirement.

In September 2013, Mr Spencer Lewis took over the role of headteacher, having previously had the same role at King Solomon High School in Barkingside. The school previously had achieved specialist school status as a Business and Enterprise College (before converting to an academy).
