= Dove Lake =

Dove Lake can refer to:

- Dove Lake (Montgomery County, Pennsylvania)
- Dove Lake (Tasmania)
