= Scène d'été =

Painting by Frédéric Bazille

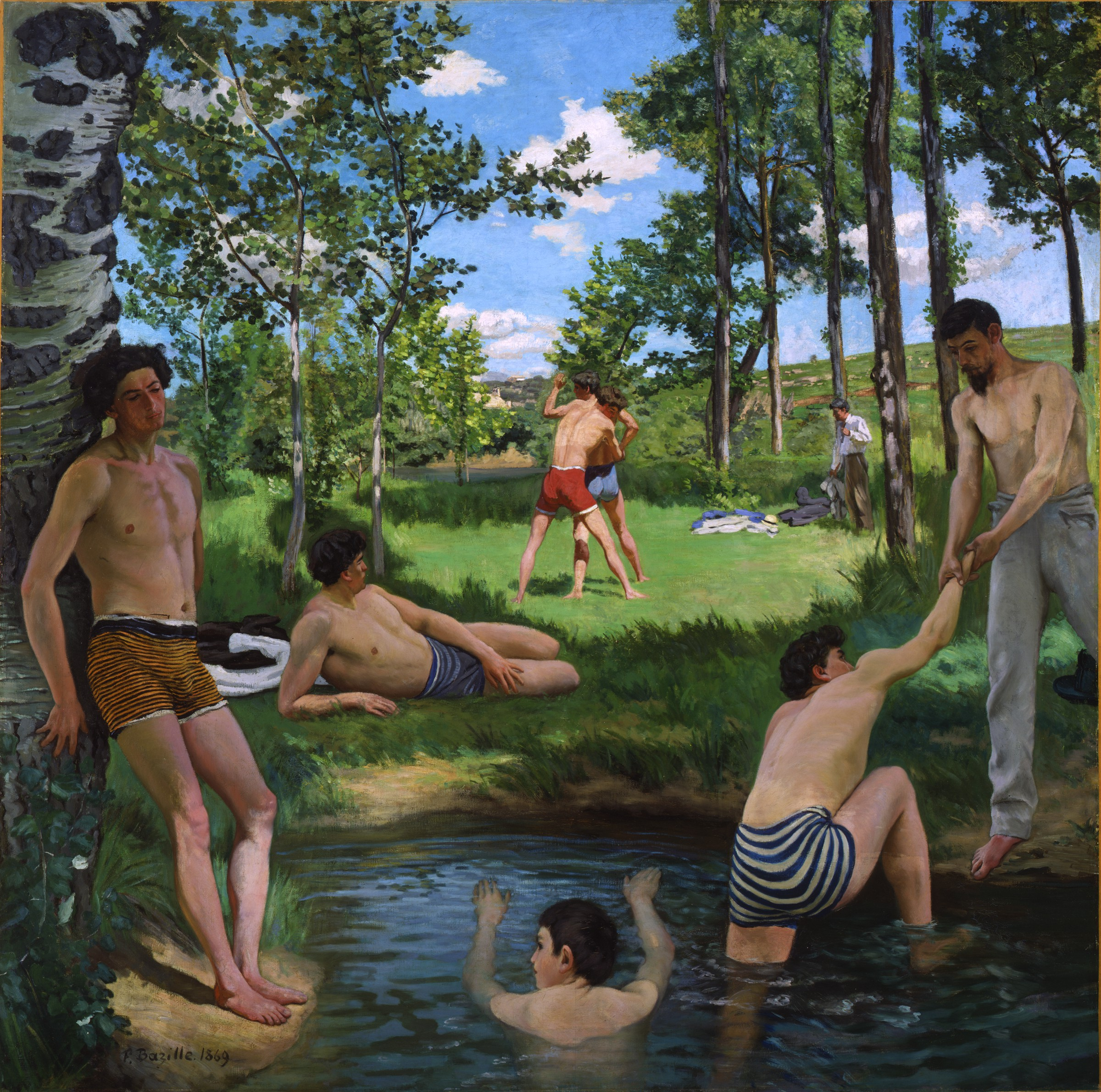
- Artist: Frédéric Bazille
- Year: 1869
- Medium: Oil on canvas
- Dimensions: 158 cm × 158 cm (62 in × 62 in)
- Location: Fogg Art Museum, Cambridge, Massachusetts

Scène d'été, Summer Scene, or The Bathers is an oil-on-canvas painting by the French artist Frédéric Bazille from 1869. It is now in the Fogg Art Museum in Cambridge, Massachusetts. The Impressionist painting depicts young men dressed in swimsuits having a leisurely day along the banks of the Lez river near Montpellier. Bazille composed the painting by first drawing the human figures in his Paris studio and then transporting the drawings to the outdoor setting. Like his earlier painting Réunion de famille (1867), Scène d'été captured friends and family members in the outdoors. Scène d'été was exhibited at the Paris Salon in 1870.

It may have been an inspiration for Thomas Eakins' The Swimming Hole (1885), as Eakins was in Paris in 1870 and could have seen Bazille's painting.

== Background ==
After his painting Le Pêcheur à L'épervier (1868) was rejected from the Salon, Bazille was spurred to paint a larger and more ambitious work, including not two, but eight figures set in nature. He sought to create a more developed and mature painting in the same style and evoking similar sentiments. Bazille first conceived of Scène d'été in April, 1869, and he initially intended the work to depict nude figures, as revealed by his personal letters. He also planned for the work to be the crowning achievement of his exploration of figures set in an open-air ('plein-air') setting. The subject of bathing, then, provided Bazille with the ability to combine his studies of the nude with this desire to explore plein-air painting.

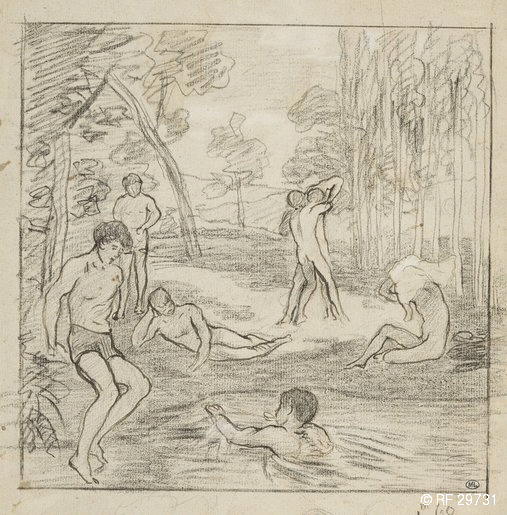
Frédéric Bazille, Study for Scène d'été (1869), Paris, Musée du Louvre

The work is the result of long and arduous planning by Bazille, as demonstrated by the numerous sketches and drawings that depict Bazille's original plans for the painting. In addition to the many rough sketches, Bazille created his only known drawing of an entire composition. Rather than the eight figures depicted in Scène d'été, the compositional drawing consists only of seven, with four of them—the young man reclining, the figure in the front-left, and the two wrestlers in the background—placed in the same location as in the final painting. Additionally, the wrestling figures in the center of the canvas are locked together more rigorously in the painting than in the drawing, while the boy in the water below is more-or-less floating with his head briefly turned to the left, unlike in the drawing, where the boy adopts a more natural swimming pose. The sketches found in Bazille's sketchbook depict variations of the figures found in the drawing and final painting, demonstrating how Bazille meticulously planned the poses of each figure. The two wrestling figures are drawn multiple times in various interlocking grips, and another of these sketches shows a seated figure with his back turned to the spectator, likely revealing another figure Bazille refrained from including in the final work.

== Description ==
Scène d'été consists of eight male figures basking and bathing on the banks of the river Lez, near Méric. Apart from the two wrestlers in the center of the work, the figures are shaded by white poplar trees. Art historian Michel Hilaire observes that the painting demonstrates Bazille's mastery of light. Bazille captures the vivid sunlight of the summer day by painting distinct, high-contrast areas of dark and light, and through the use of bright colors, from the light greens and yellows of the foliage, to the red and blue bathing suits, the darker greens and blues for the shaded regions, the bright blue sky, and the light tan, beige, and pink for the skin of the figures.

In terms of technique, Bazille shies away from loose or spontaneous brushwork, rather opting to define the landscape through thin, detailed lines and shapes. Critically, the buildings in the distant background modernize the scene, making the work distinct from the bright, naturalist works of the Renaissance, as well as cementing the scene as a depiction of Bazille's own surroundings, rather than of an ancient or Arcadian stage. Further evidence of modernity in the painting is highlighted by the figures being clothed rather than nude—time-accurate given Montpellier's restriction of nude bathing in the Lez.

Through Scène d'été, Bazille demonstrates the connection between his work and the larger realist movement, showcasing ordinary events of everyday life as Bazille saw them. As art historian François Daulte describes, Bazille, in Scène d'été, creates a harmony between the bodies, the trees, and the clouds, in some ways to evoke renaissance or even classical sentiments. Bazille further evokes renaissance art through the composition's symmetry, the square shape of the canvas, which was particularly unusual at the time, and through the boldness and vividness of the color palette. Here, the subject of the painting is important as well. While Bazille evokes work and themes of art of the past, Scène d'été is also innovative, especially given that it takes themes usually associated with the female nude, and reinvents them according to both principles of modernity and notions of masculinity.

== Inspiration ==
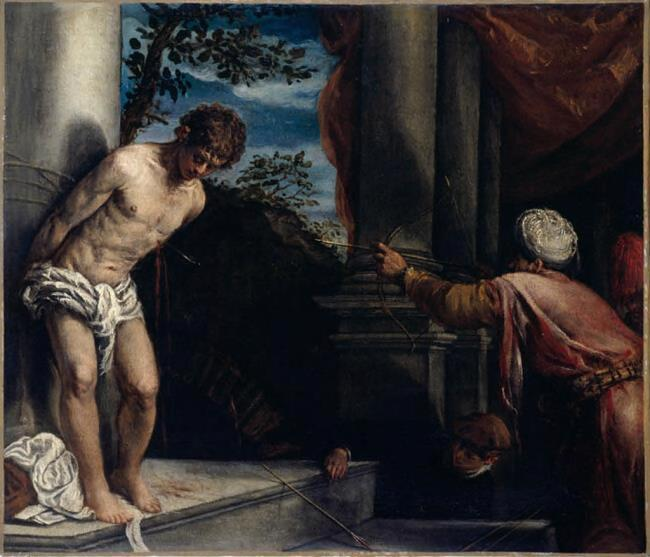
Jacopo Bassano, The Martyrdom of St. Sebastian (1574), Musée des Beaux-Arts, Dijon

Though Bazille's Scène d'été contains many modern elements, the poses of some figures resemble those found in older paintings. The figure in the left of the foreground, leaning against the tree, closely resembles the primary figure in Jacopo Bassano's The Martyrdom of St. Sebastian (1574), sharing both the same location on the canvas and the similarity in pose. Bazille would have even seen this painting at the Musée des Beaux-Arts, Dijon in 1868, and Bazille drew the St. Sebastian figure itself in one of his sketchbooks.

The reclining man on the riverbank evokes the reclining figure of Laurent de la Hyre's Landscape with Shepherd Playing the Flute (1647), a painting belonging to the Musée Fabre in Montpellier itself. Additionally, the seated figure undressing, seen in Bazille's preparatory drawings but not included in the final painting, recalls the figure engaged in the same action in Nicolas Poussin's St. John Baptizes the People (1635–37), located at the Musée du Louvre, Paris. Finally, the wrestlers in the center of the canvas were likely inspired by Gustave Courbet's The Wrestlers (1853), which features two male figures, clothed similarly to the figures of Scène d'été, engaged in a wrestling match akin to the one shown in Bazille's painting.

The work also includes references to relatively recent avant-garde paintings like Edouard Manet's Le Déjeuner sur l'herbe. The overall composition of Bazille's painting rotates the composition of the Luncheon 180 degrees.

== Gallery of sketches ==
The following are the various sketches that depict Bazille's planning for the figures and elements in Scène d'été, all of which currently reside at the Musée du Louvre, Paris. These sketches demonstrate the rigorous process and planning Bazille undertook in preparing to paint the final work.

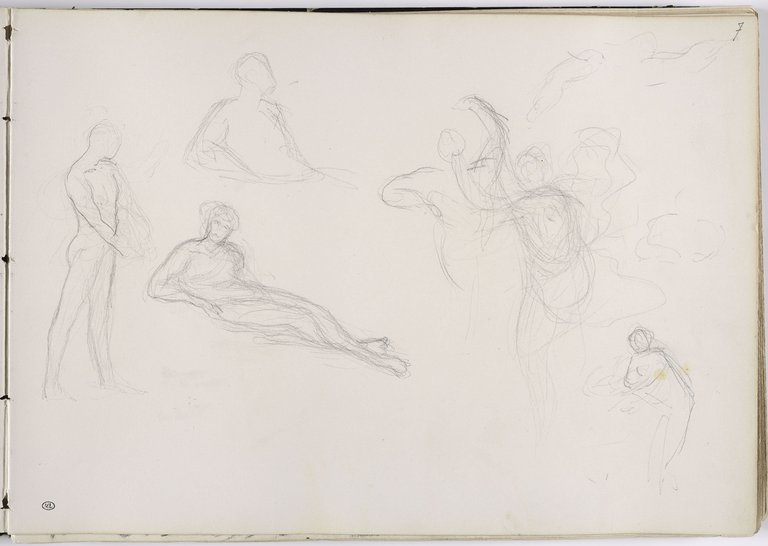

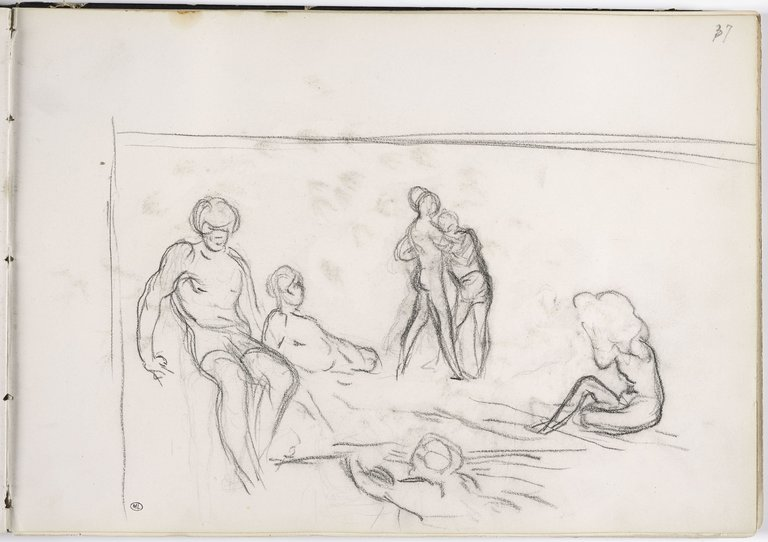

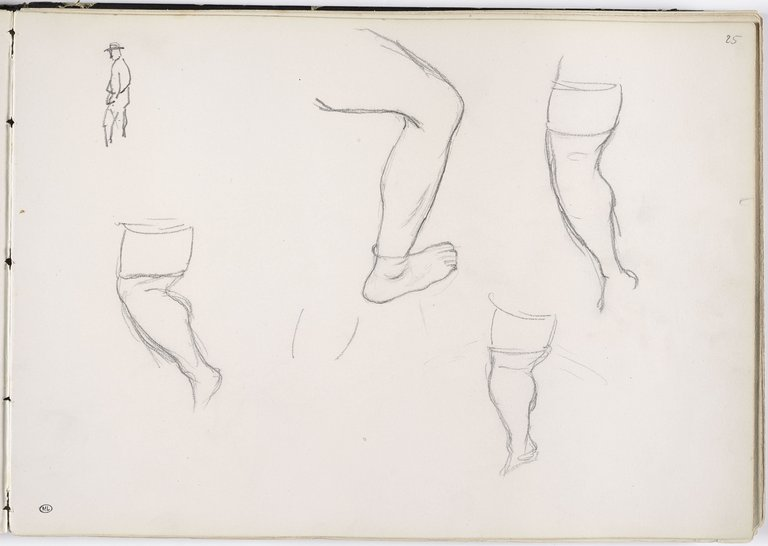

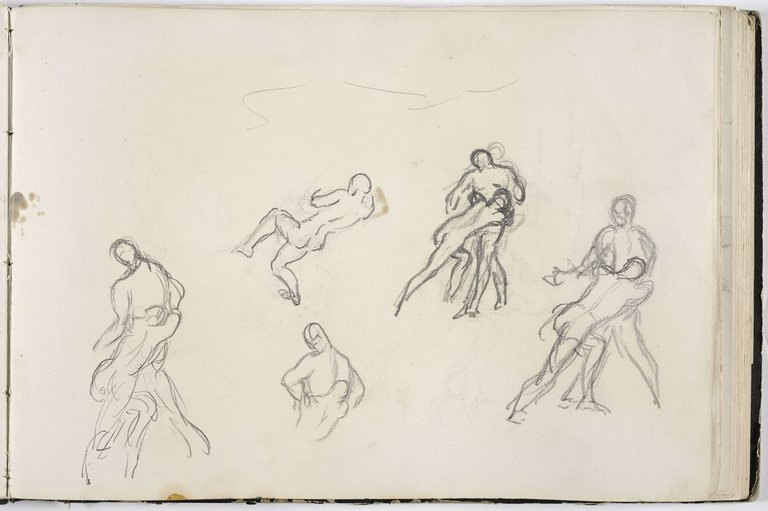

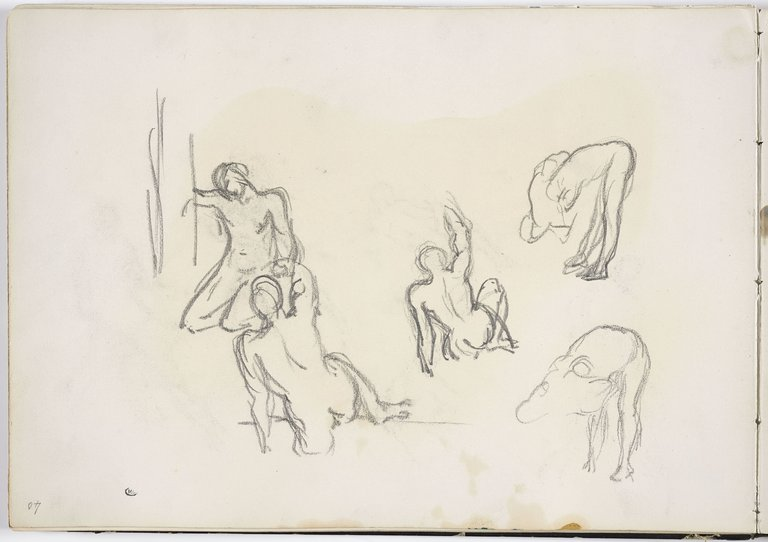

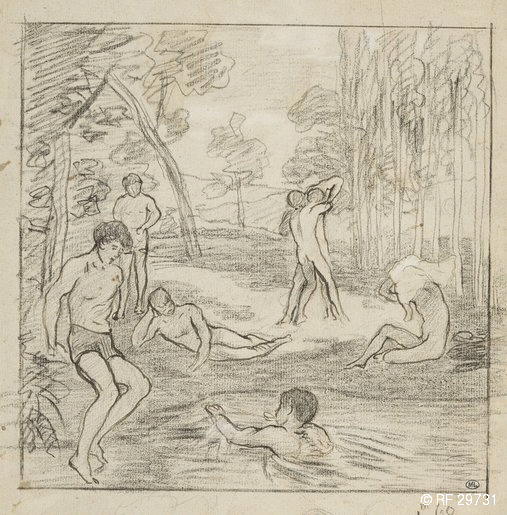

== See also ==
- List of paintings by Frédéric Bazille
