= Dove Lake (Montgomery County, Pennsylvania) =

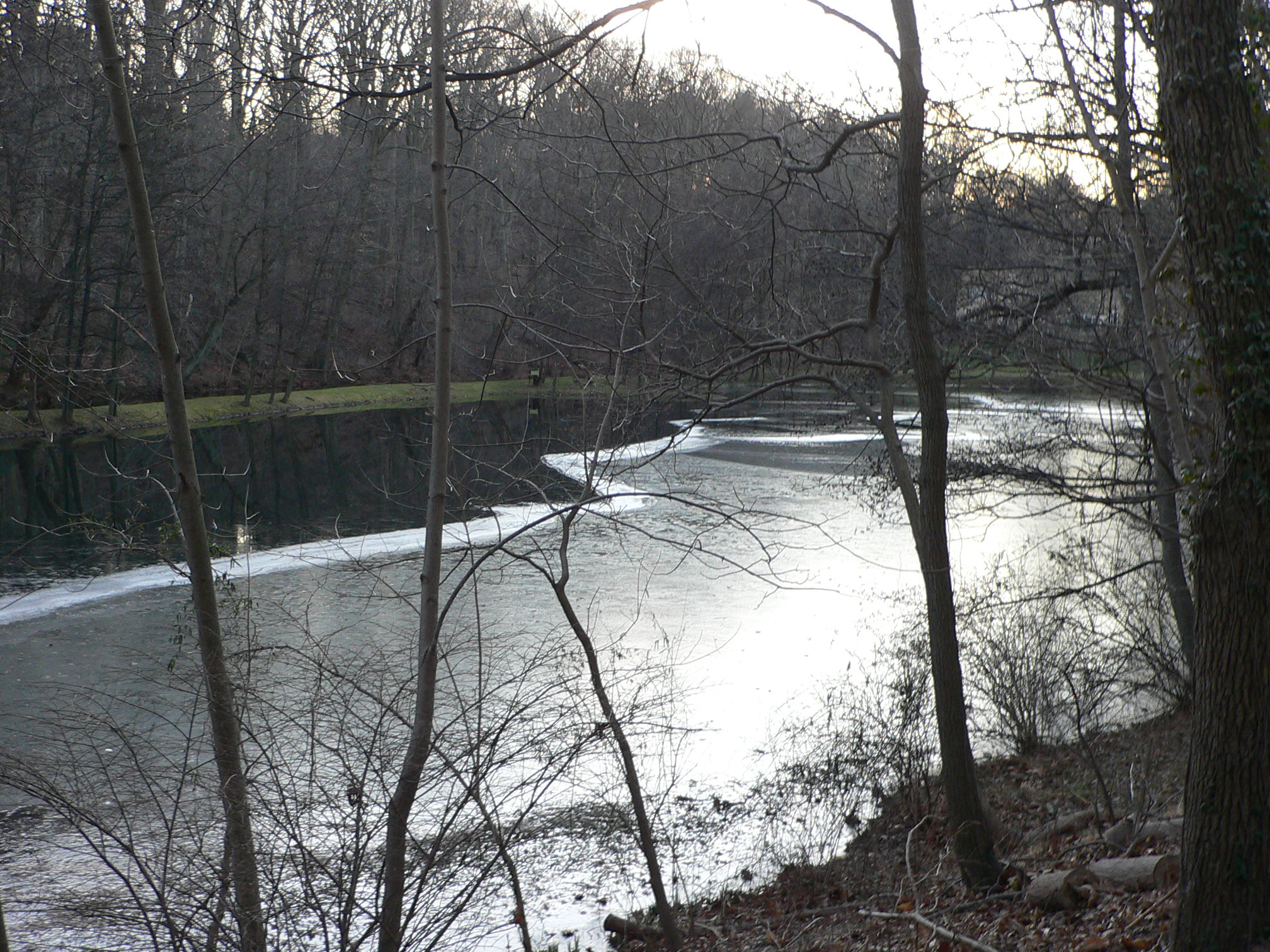

- Location within Pennsylvania Location within the United States
- Location: Lower Merion Township, Montgomery County, Pennsylvania, United States
- Coordinates: 40°1′50.7″N 75°17′29.2″W
- Type: reservoir
- Primary inflows: Mill Creek
- Primary outflows: Mill Creek
- Basin countries: United States
- Surface elevation: 233 ft (71 m)

Dove Lake is a reservoir in Montgomery County, Pennsylvania. It was created by damming Mill Creek.

Dove Lake was the setting of the 1885 painting The Swimming Hole by Thomas Eakins.

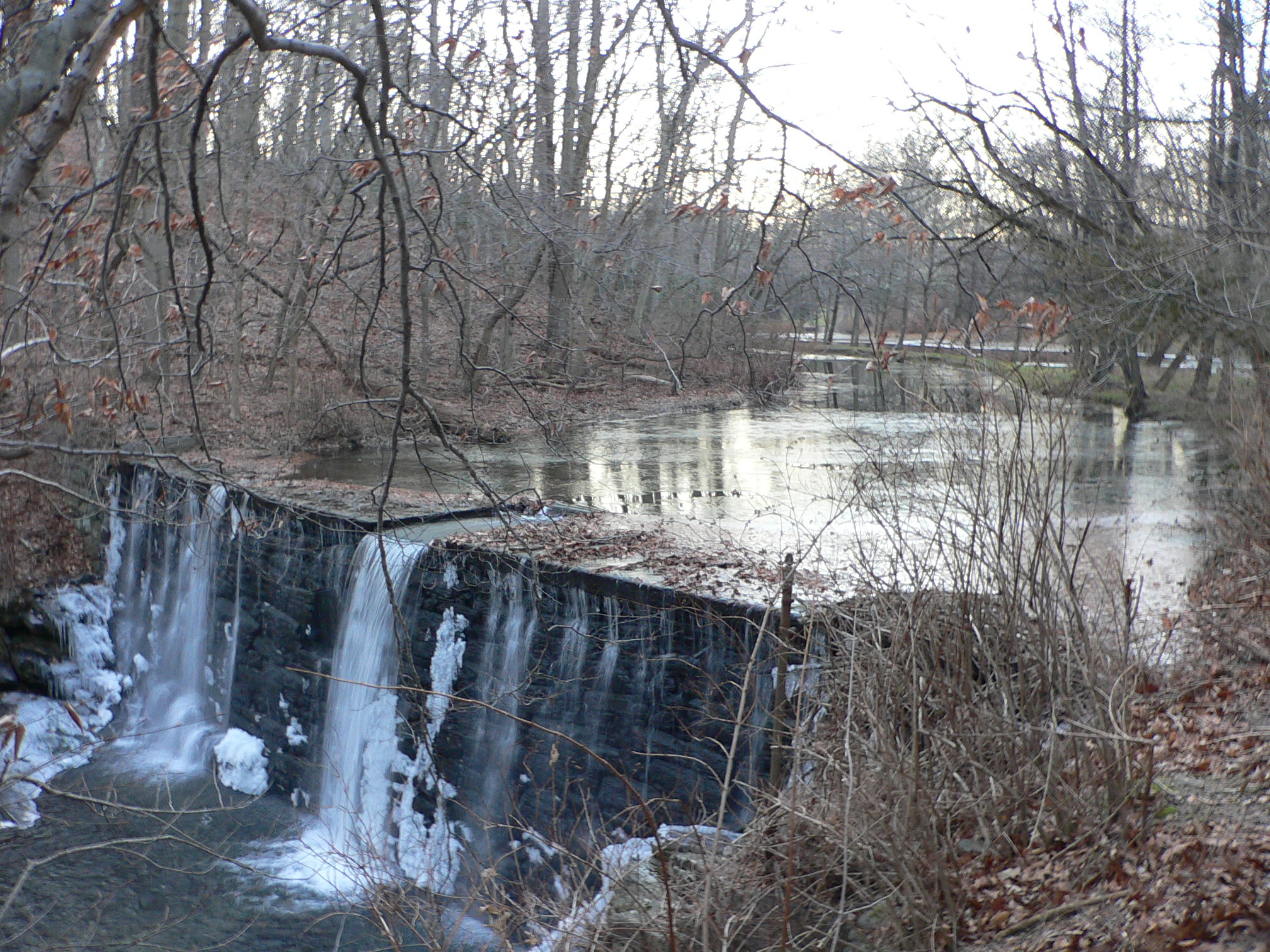
Dove Lake Dam.

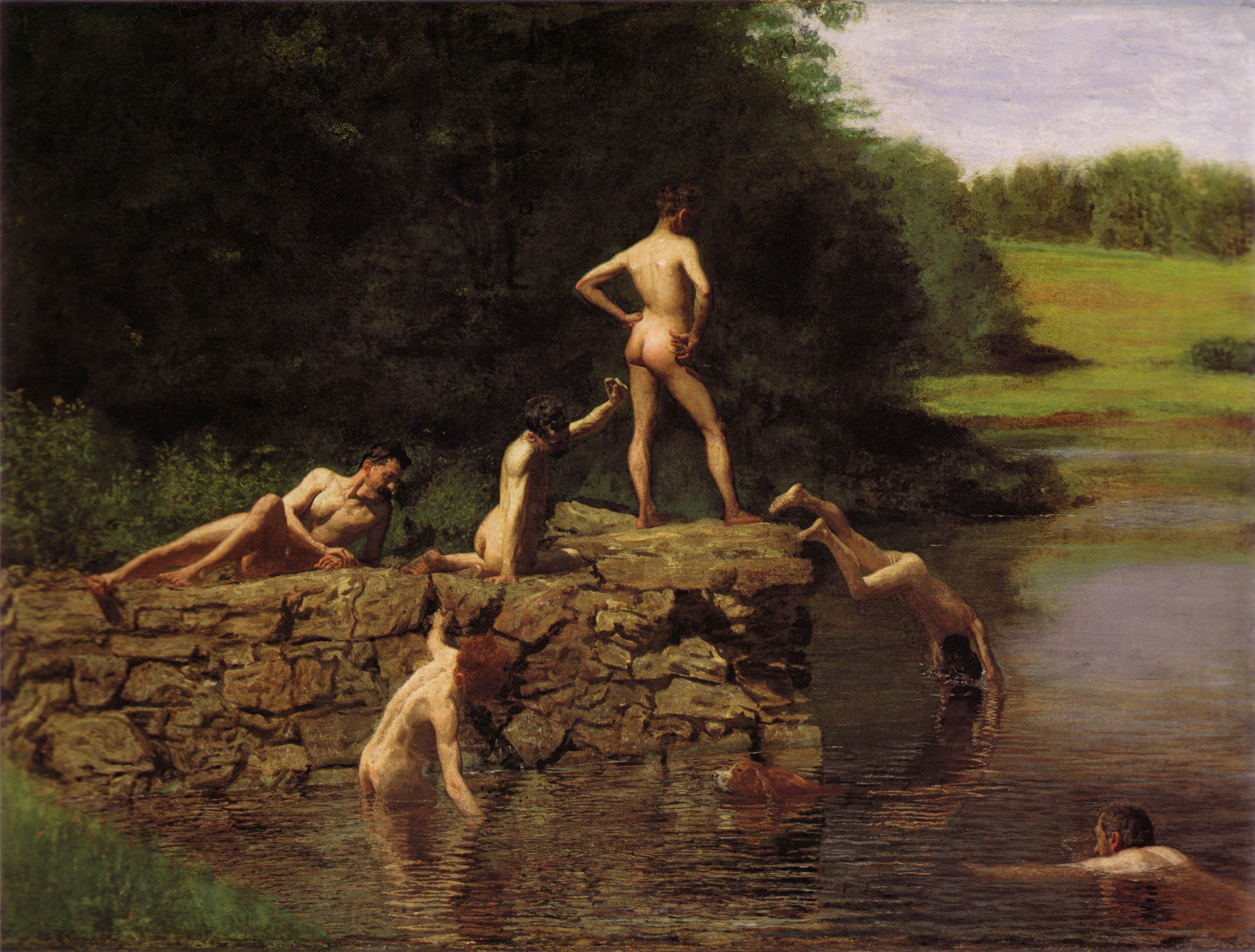
The Swimming Hole by Thomas Eakins, 1884–85, Amon Carter Museum, Fort Worth, Texas.

Dove Lake is on a privately owned property in Bryn Mawr and Gladwyne.
