= Mill Creek (Lower Merion, Pennsylvania) =

River in Lower Merion, Pennsylvania, United States

Coordinates: 40°02′48″N 75°15′18″W

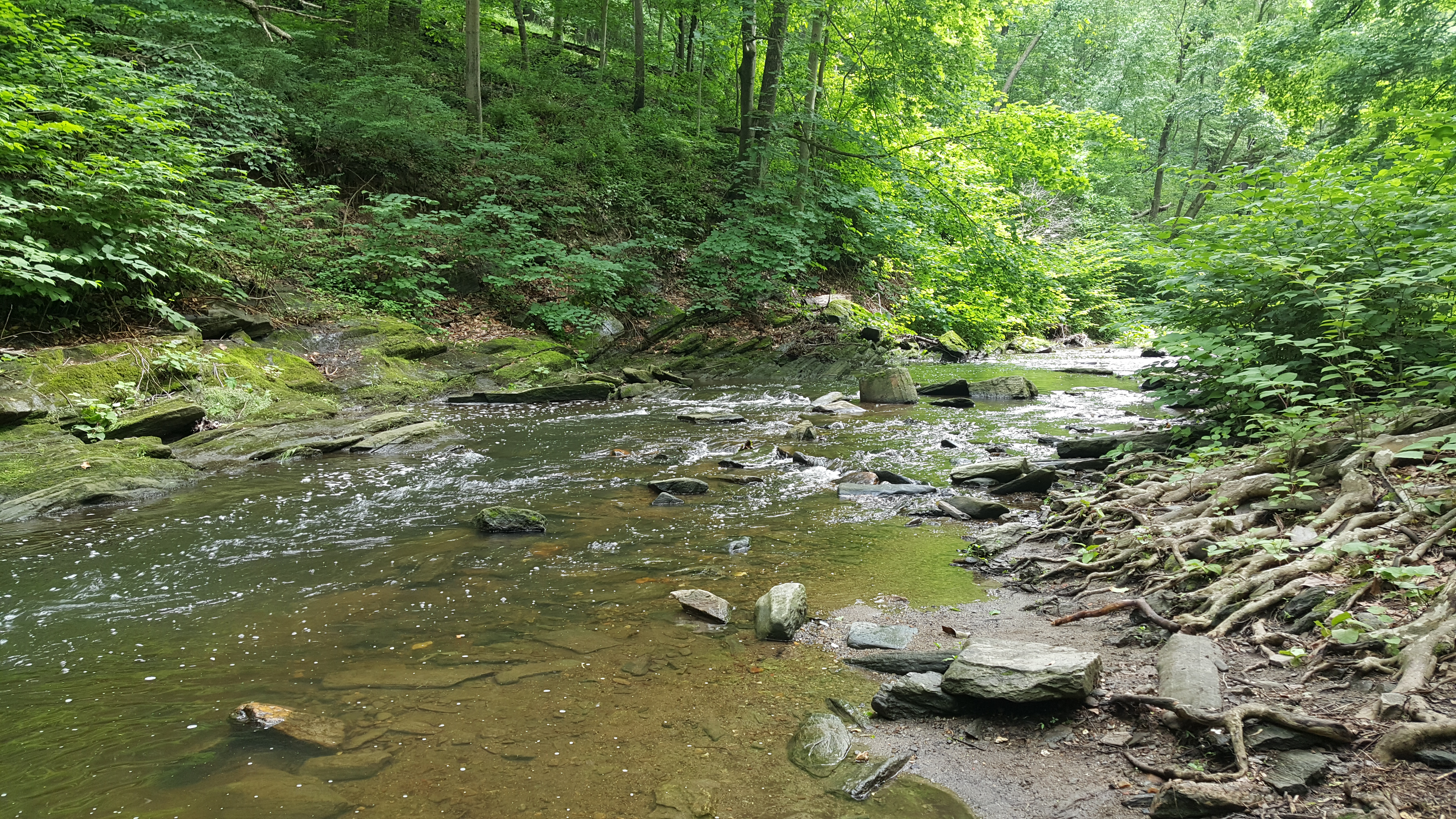
Mill Creek, at the base of Rolling Hill Park

Mill Creek is a 6.6-mile-long (10.6 km) tributary of the Schuylkill River in Lower Merion Township, Montgomery County, Pennsylvania, United States.

The north branch arises from a number of sources north of Lancaster Avenue (U.S. Route 30) in Villanova. The south branch arises near Ardmore, and has Trout Run as a major tributary. The two branches merge near the intersection of Old Gulph Road and Mill Creek Road, and the lower creek flows east to join the Schuylkill River just upstream of the Gladwyne interchange of Interstate 76 (exit 337) and the Flat Rock Dam.

Dove Lake is located beside the north branch of Mill Creek, just upstream of where Old Gulph Road crosses the creek at a ford. The ford has a gate, which is frequently closed when high water makes crossing it dangerous.

The lower creek has some historic mills and related buildings on Mill Creek Road and nearby Rose Glen Road.

Mill Creek Road follows the south branch of the creek from Montgomery Avenue near Ardmore to Old Gulph Road, and follows the lower creek to River Road by the Schuylkill River. The road is mostly on the right bank, with two crossings near the junction with the north branch.

== Wildlife ==
Creek Chubbs are commonly found, and they share the water with Snapping Turtles, salamanders, and crayfish.

== See also ==
- List of rivers of Pennsylvania
- Mill Creek Historic District (Bryn Mawr and Gladwyne, Pennsylvania)
