= Arcadia (painting) =

Painting by Thomas Eakins

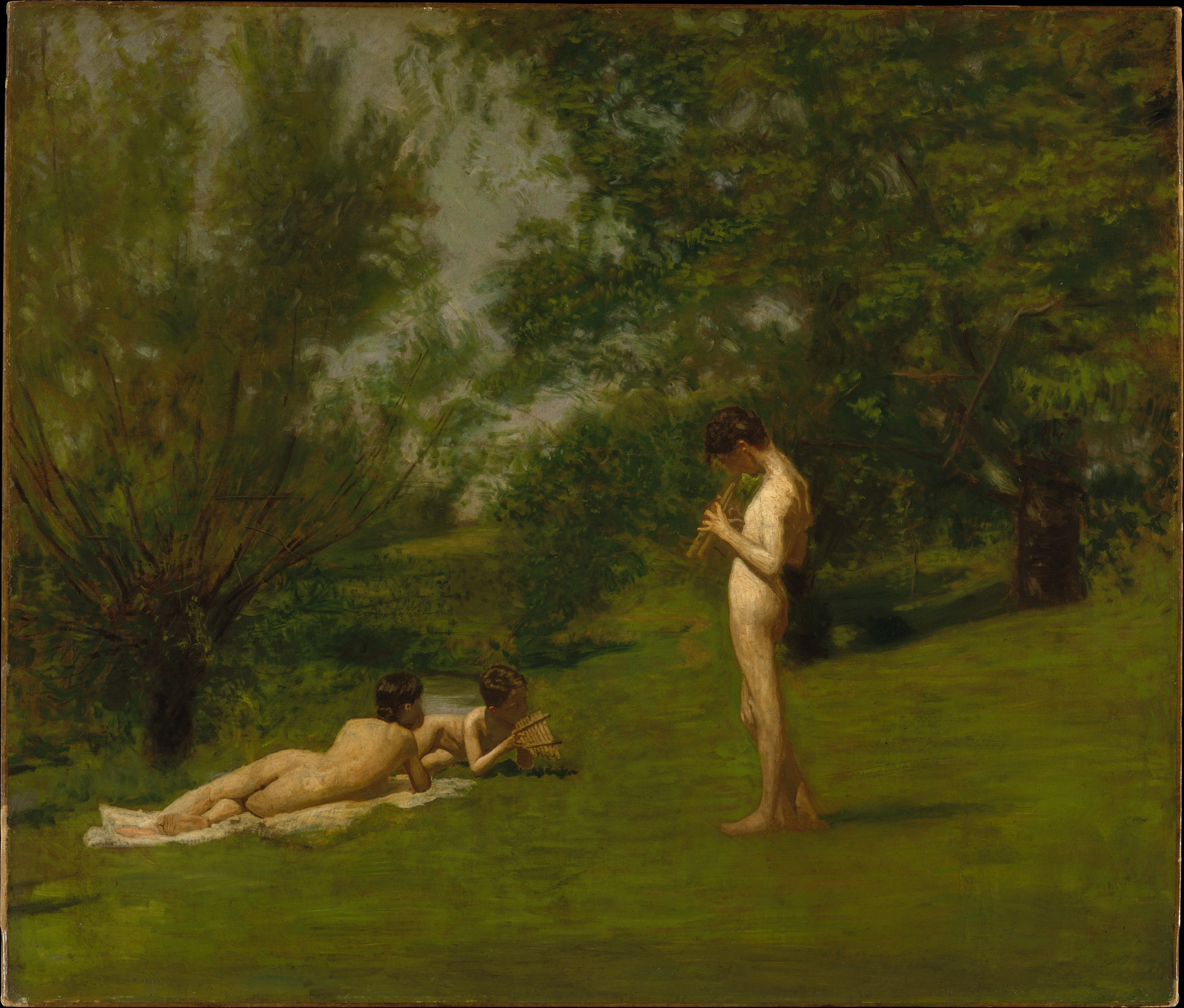
- Artist: Thomas Eakins
- Year: c.1883
- Medium: Oil on canvas
- Dimensions: 38 5/8 x 45 in (98.1 x 114.3 cm)
- Location: Metropolitan Museum of Art, New York
- Website: The Met

Arcadia is a c.1883 painting by the American painter Thomas Eakins. It is part of the collection of the Metropolitan Museum of Art, in New York. It is number #196 in the Goodrich catalogue of Eakins's work.

== History ==
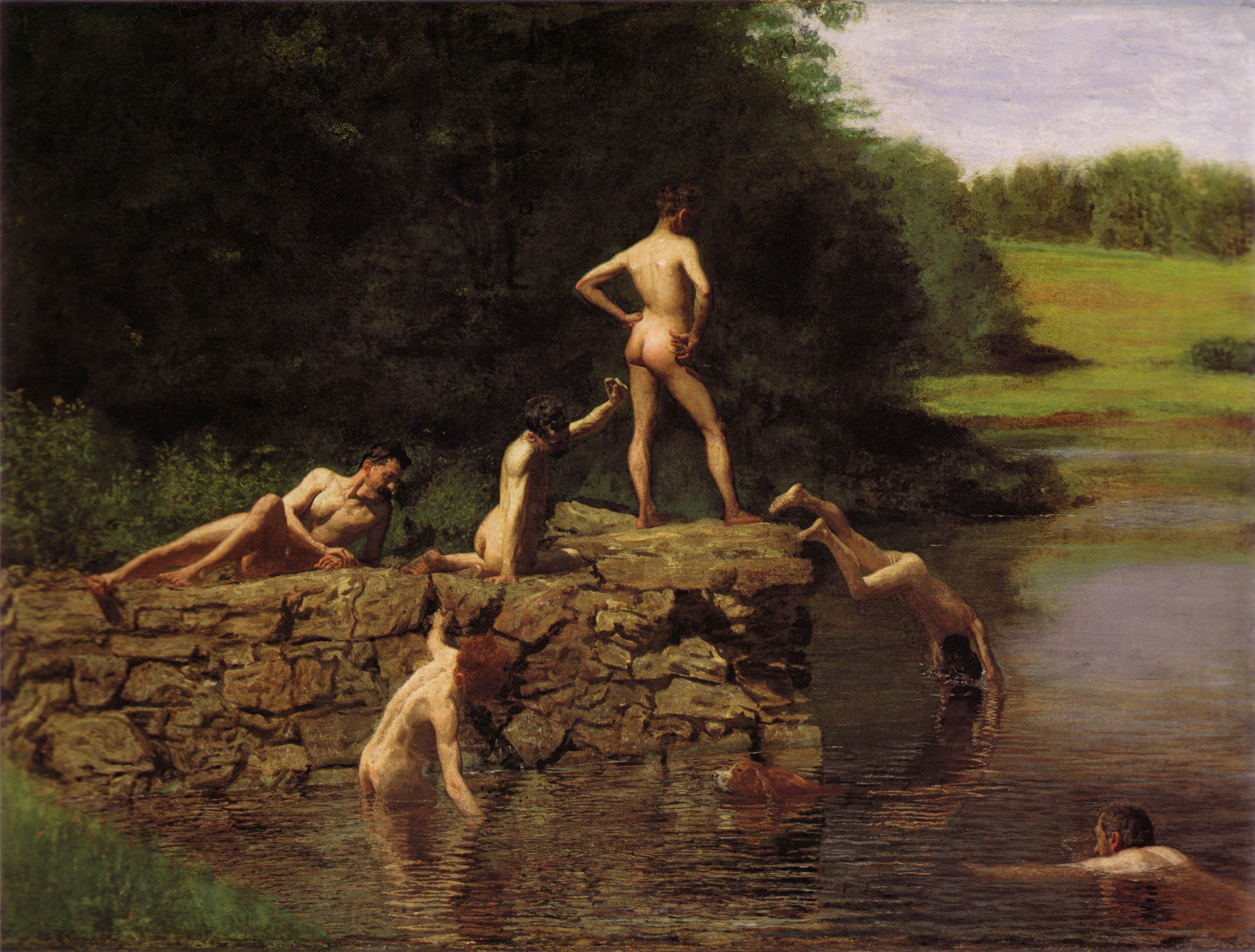
G-190. The Swimming Hole (1884–85), Amon Carter Museum.

In the early 1880s, Eakins, instructor in painting at the Pennsylvania Academy of the Fine Arts, began to photograph models dressed in classical garb or nude and posed in vaguely classical poses. He used his friends and students as models, although taking nude photographs of a student was contrary to PAFA policy. Some of the photographs were used as studies for subsequent works, including those of nude young men swimming and relaxing on the shore of Dove Lake for the painting The Swimming Hole (1884–85).

Eakins's models for Arcadia were his former student and soon-to-be wife, Susan Macdowell, his teaching assistant at PAFA, J. Laurie Wallace, and his six-year-old nephew Ben Crowell (son of his sister Fanny). He photographed them outdoors in a number of poses and used the photographs as studies for Arcadia and several related works. The Arcadian works were very personal to Eakins—he even had himself photographed as the piper.

== Photographs ==
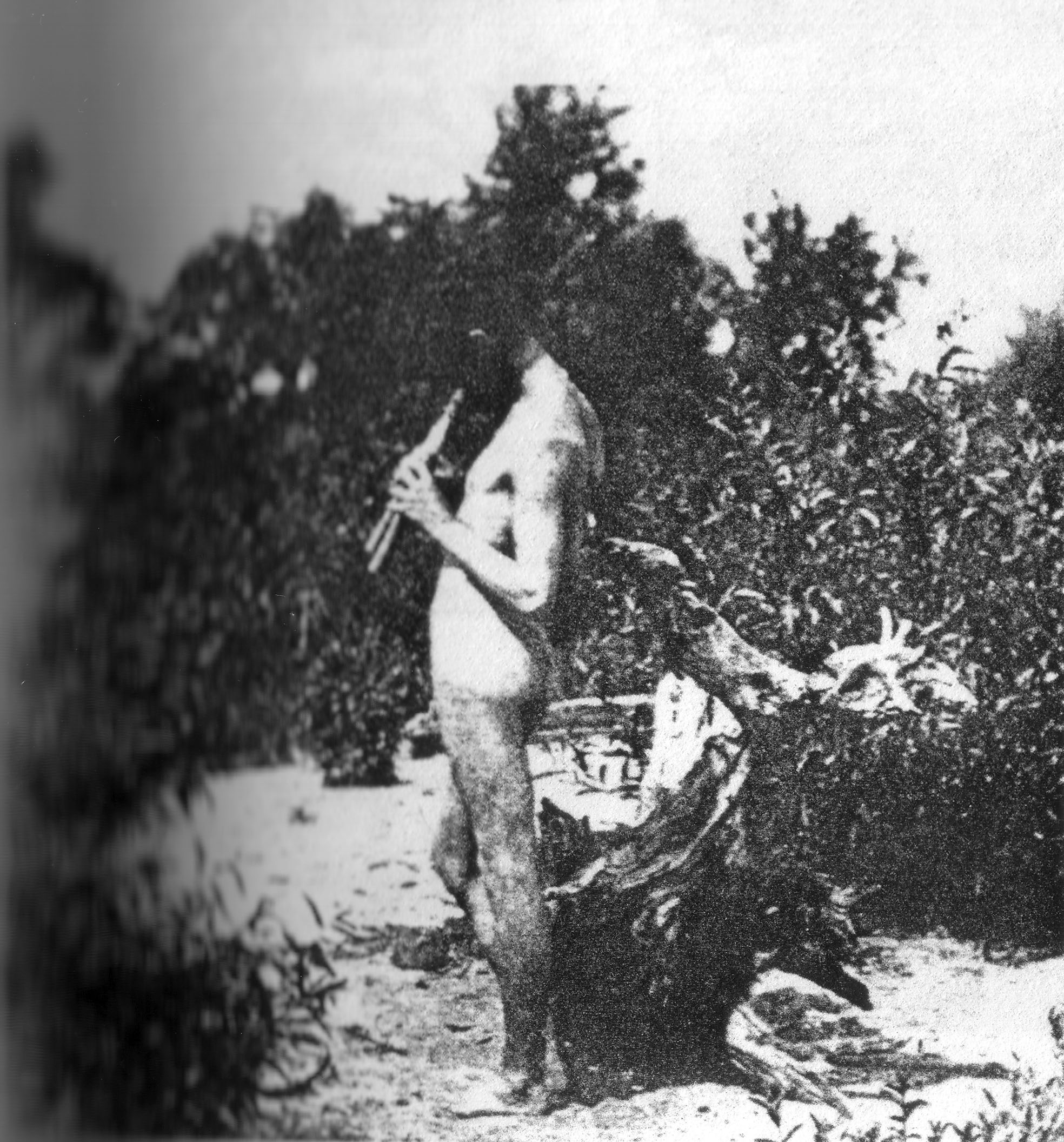
H-45. J. Laurie Wallace as "The Piper"

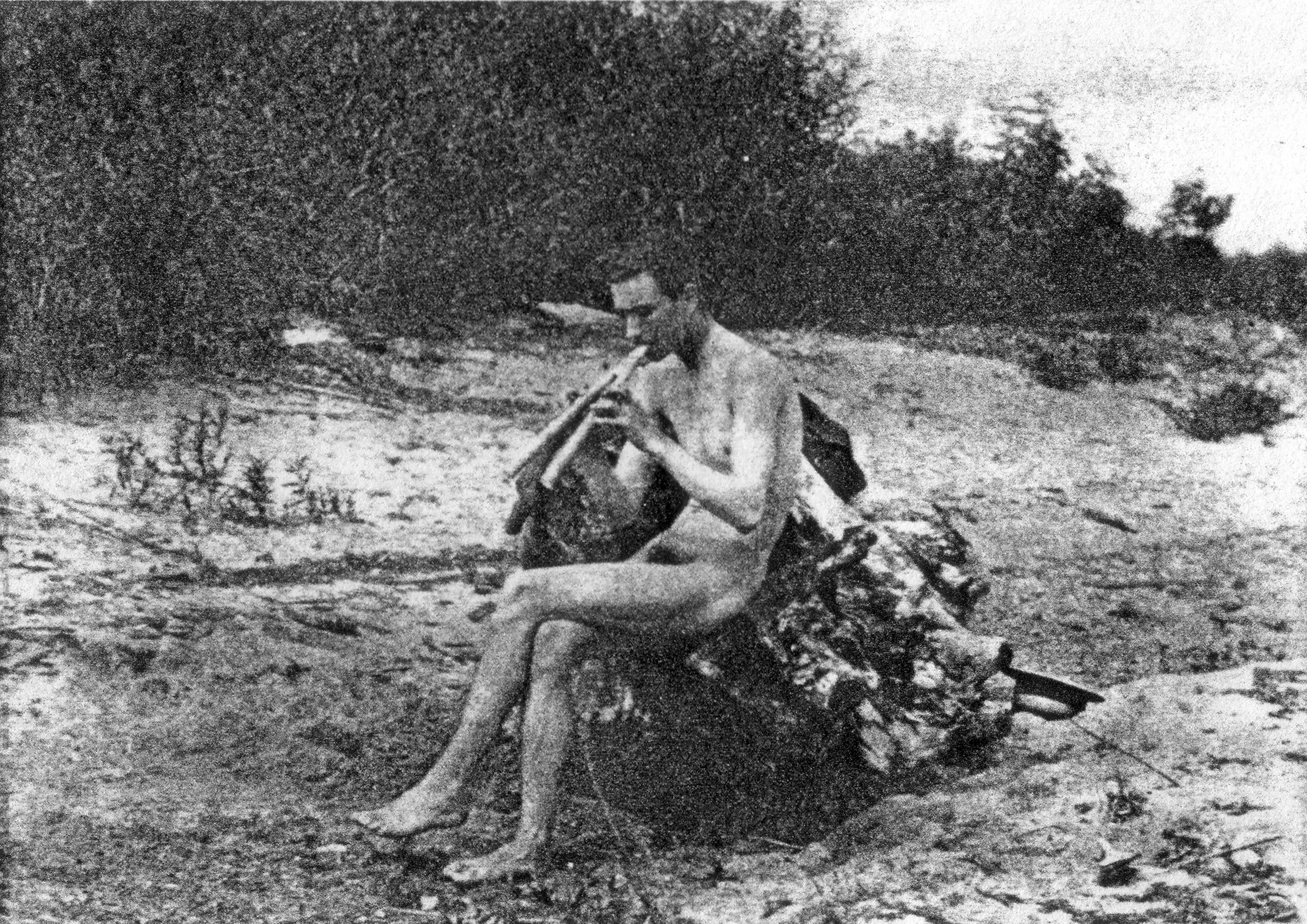
H-47. J. Laurie Wallace as "The Piper"

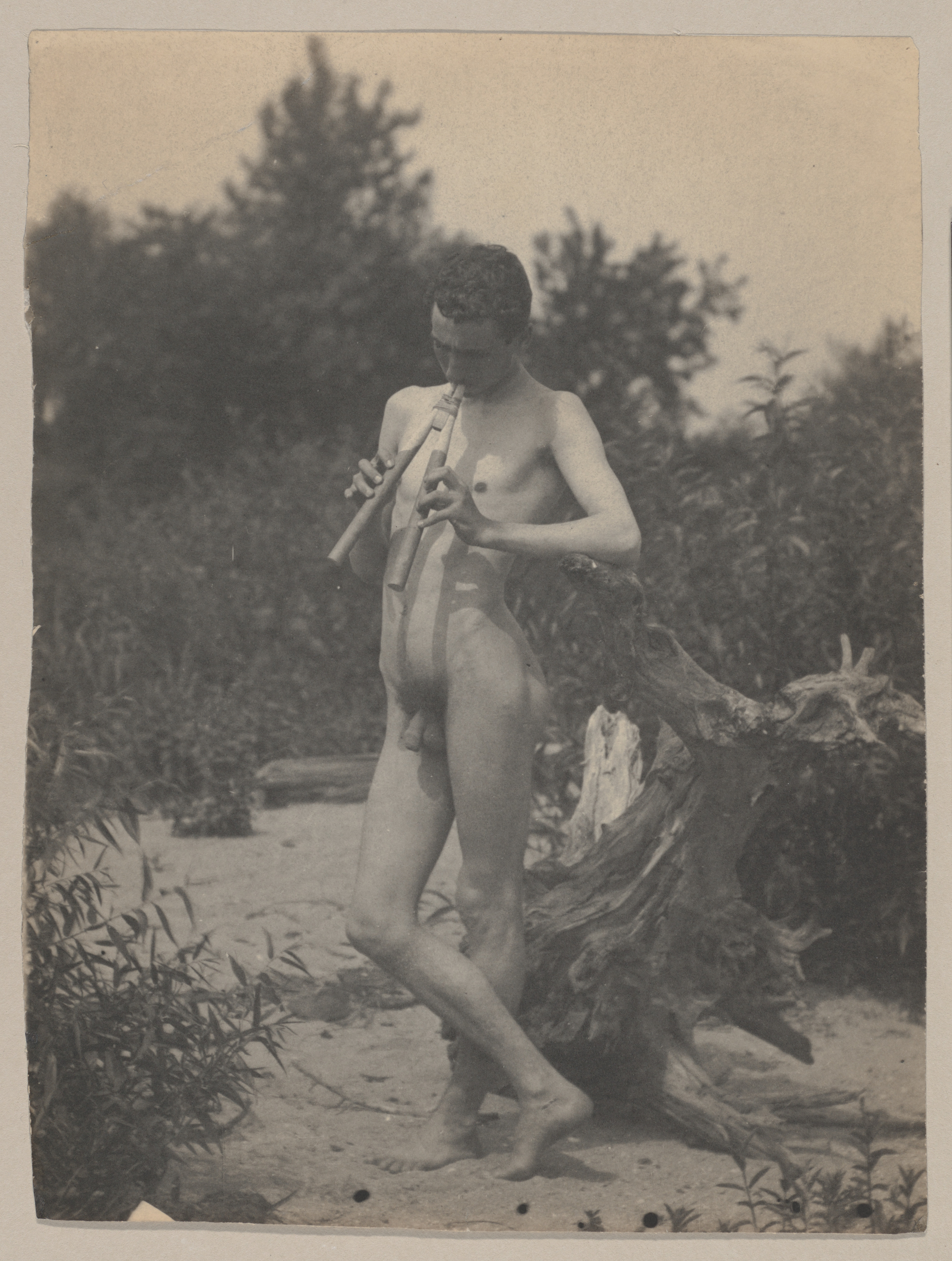
Male Nude with Pipes (J. Laurie Wallace), Metropolitan Museum of Art

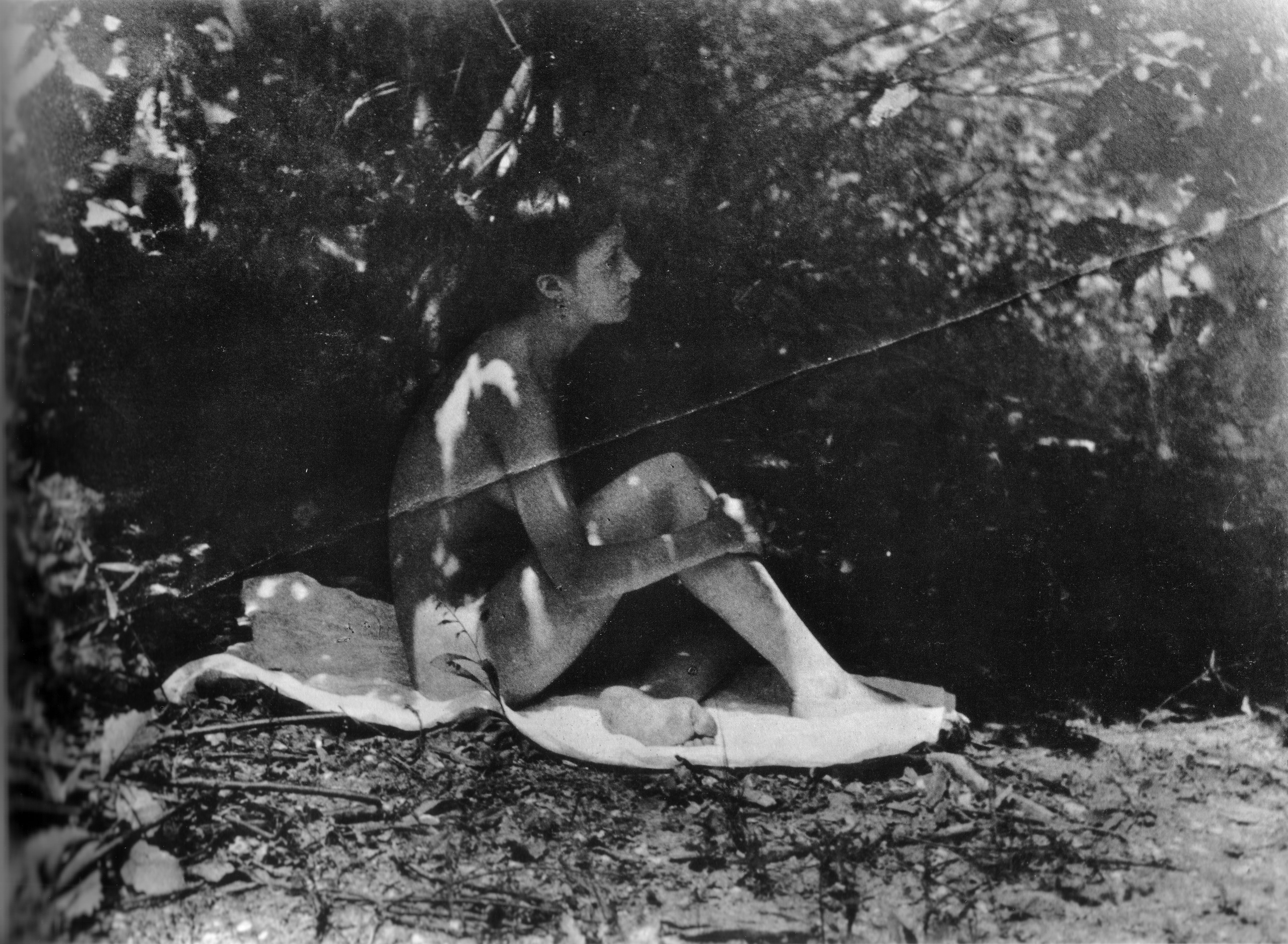
Susan Macdowell Eakins as "An Arcadian"

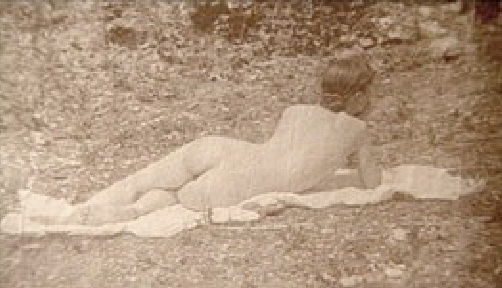
Susan Macdowell Eakins, nude, reclining on elbow, from rear

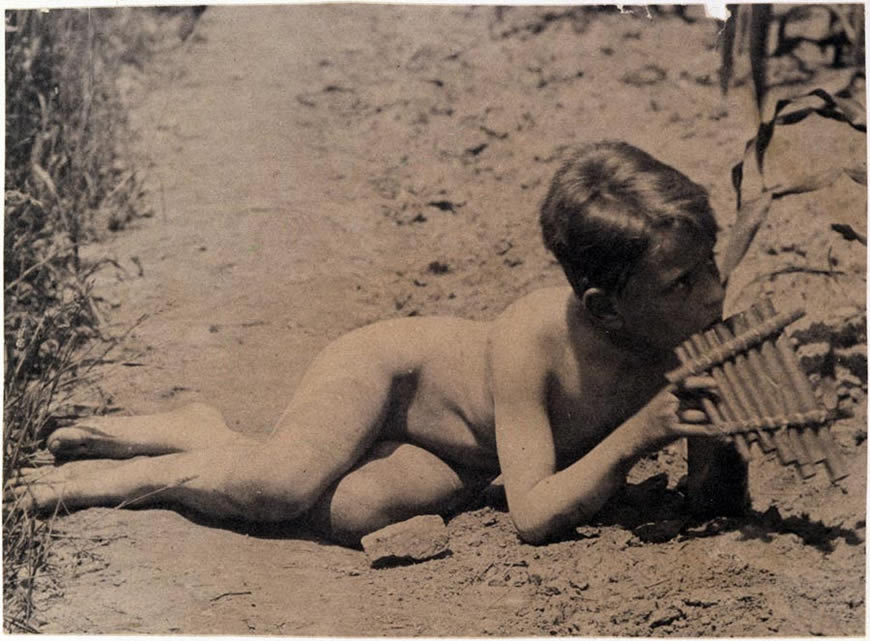
"Ben Crowell, Age 6," Hirshhorn Museum and Sculpture Garden

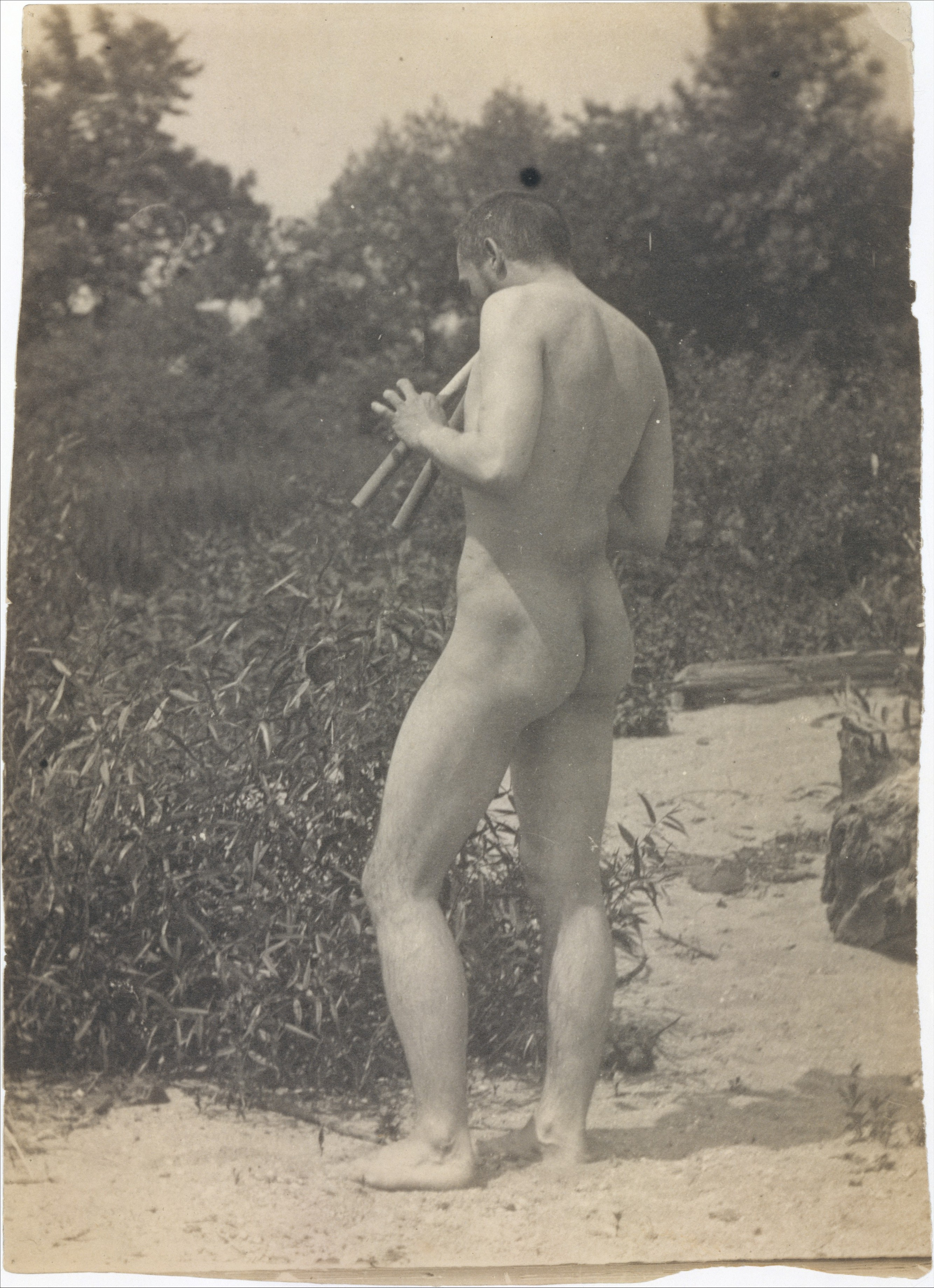
Thomas Eakins, Nude, Playing Pipes, Metropolitan Museum of Art

== Studies ==
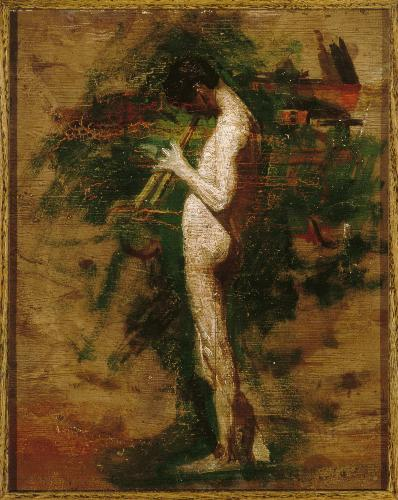
G-198. Youth Playing Pipes, Carnegie Art Museum

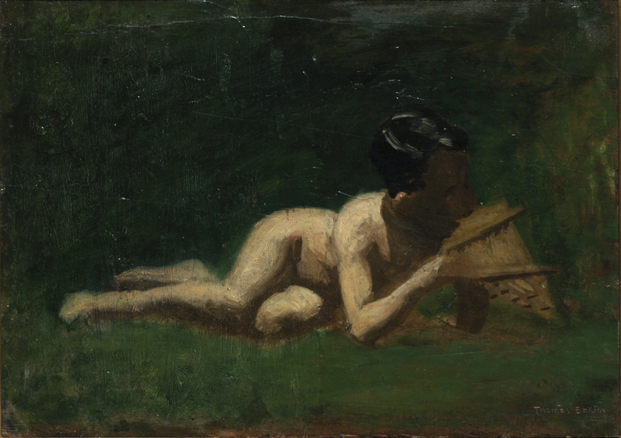
G-199. Boy Reclining, Hirshhorn Museum and Sculpture Garden

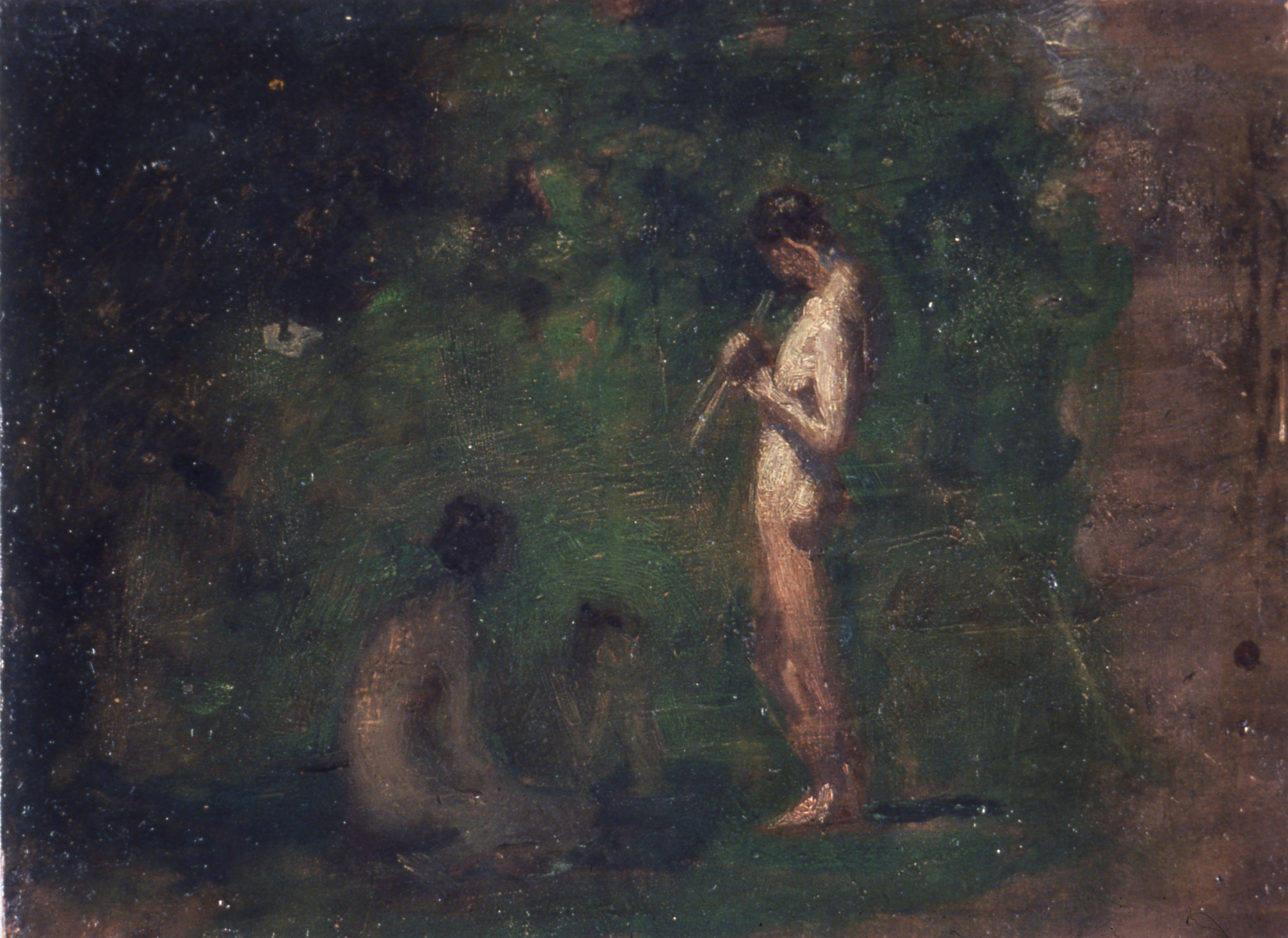
G-197. Sketch for Arcadia, Pennsylvania Academy of the Fine Arts

== Related works ==
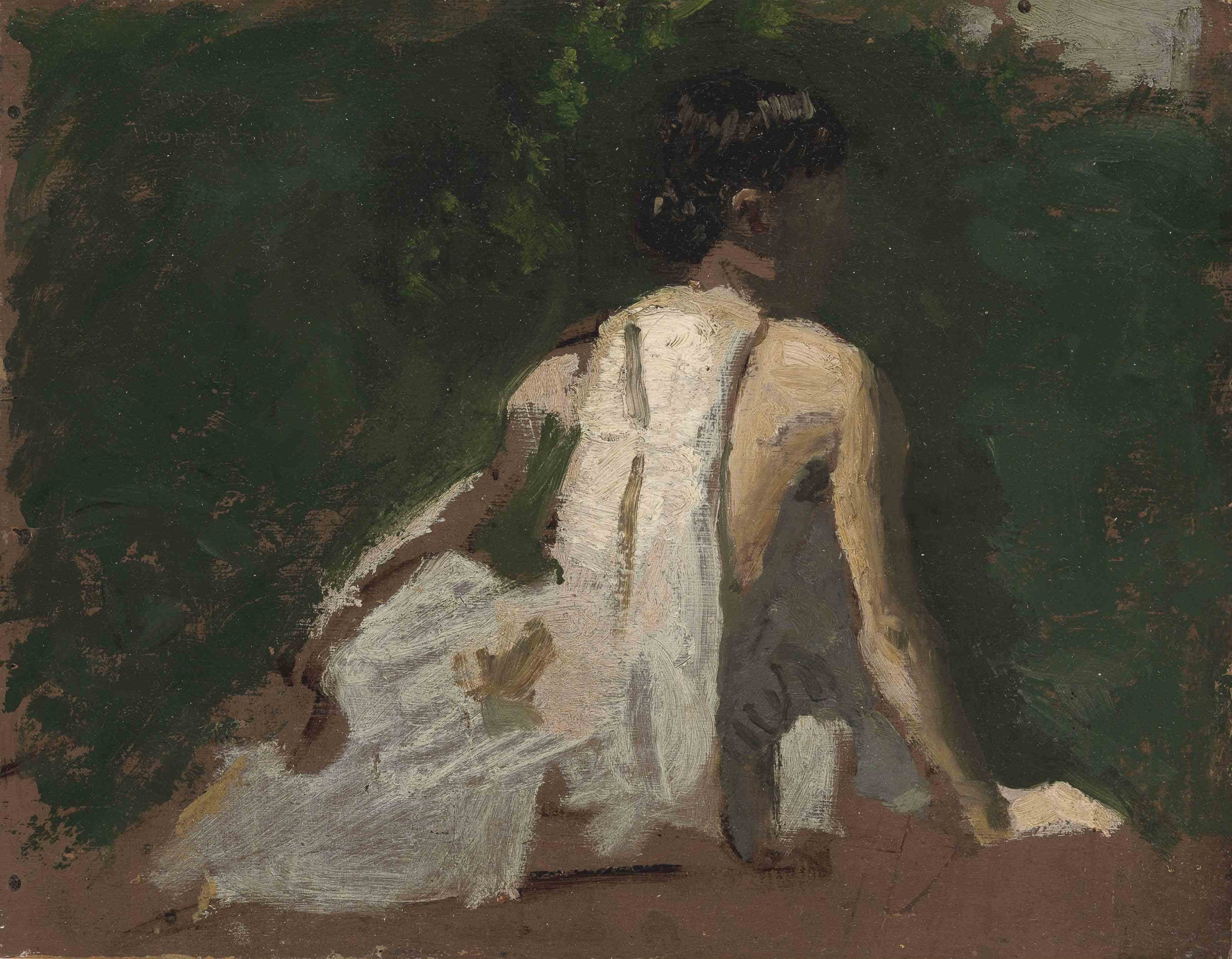
G-201. Study for An Arcadian (c.1883), private collection

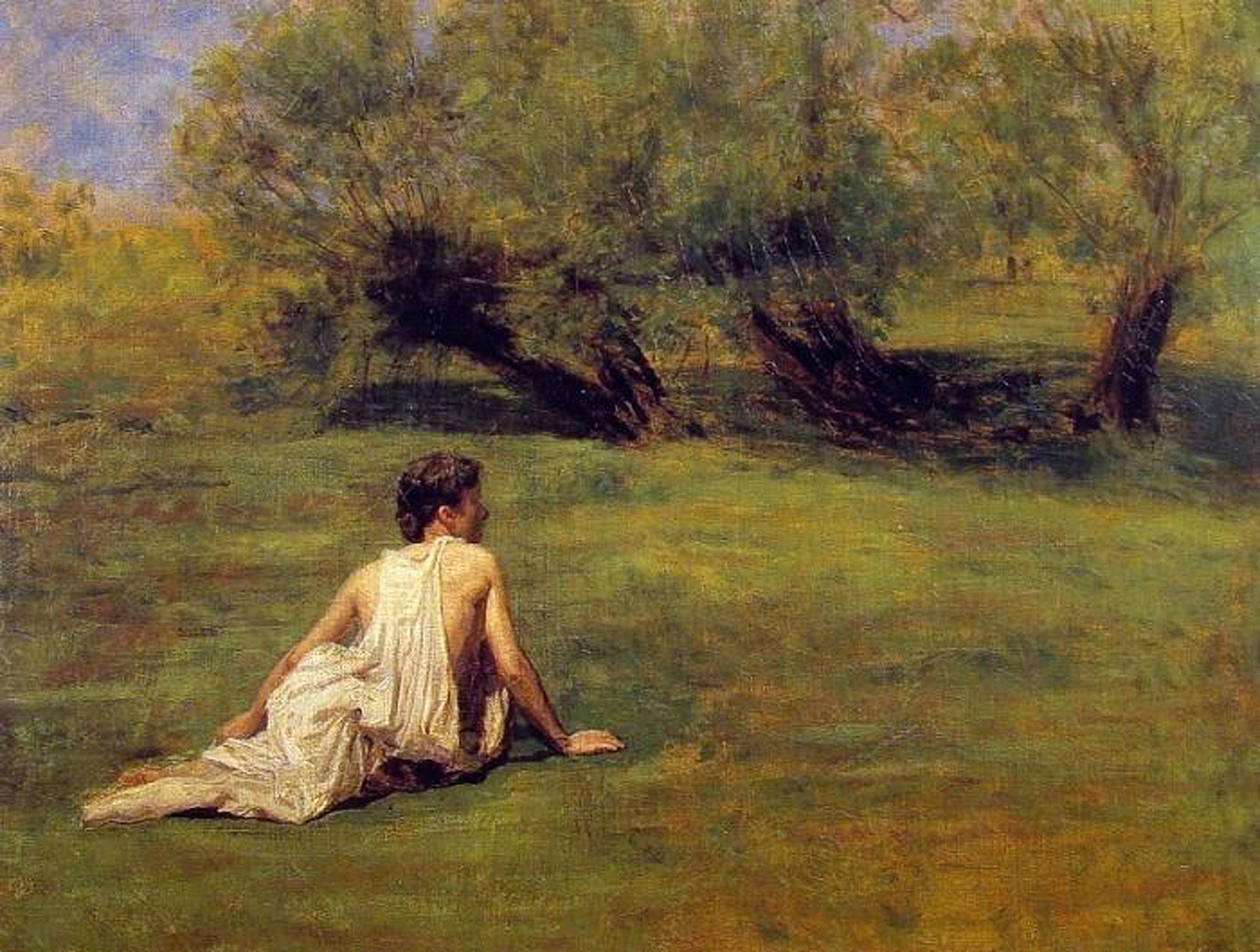
G-200. An Arcadian (c.1883), private collection

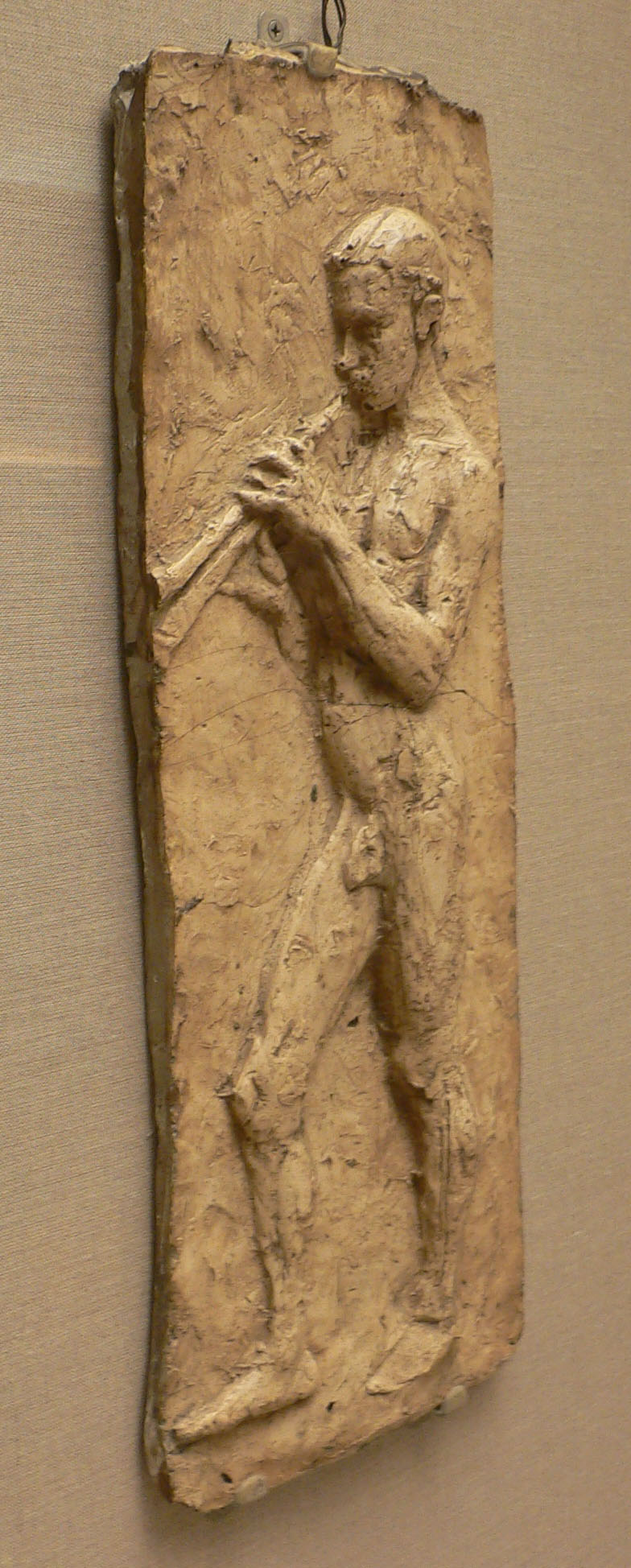
G-508. Youth Playing the Pipes (1883), Philadelphia Museum of Art

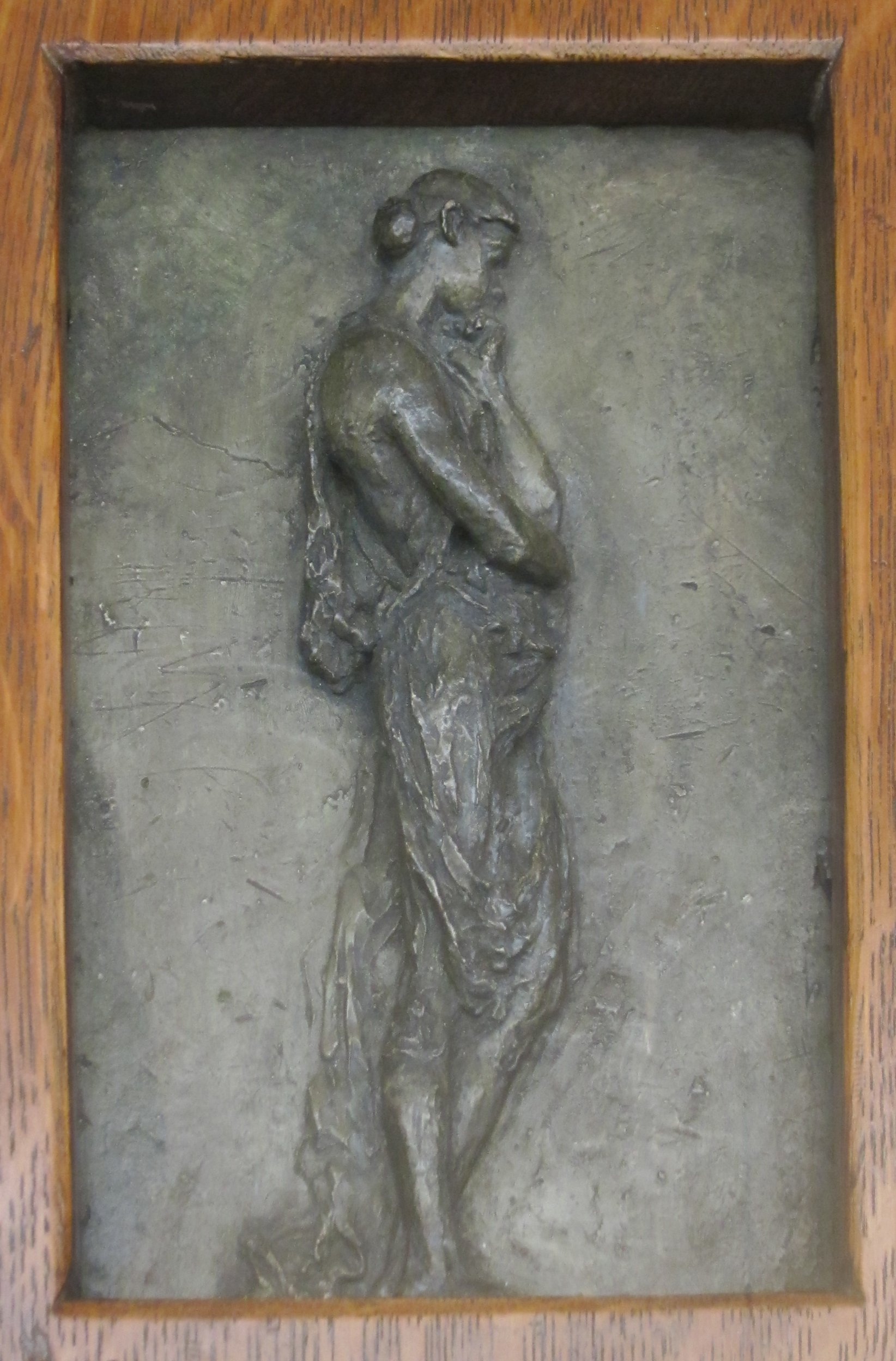
G-507. An Arcadian (1883), Hirshhorn Museum and Sculpture Gallery

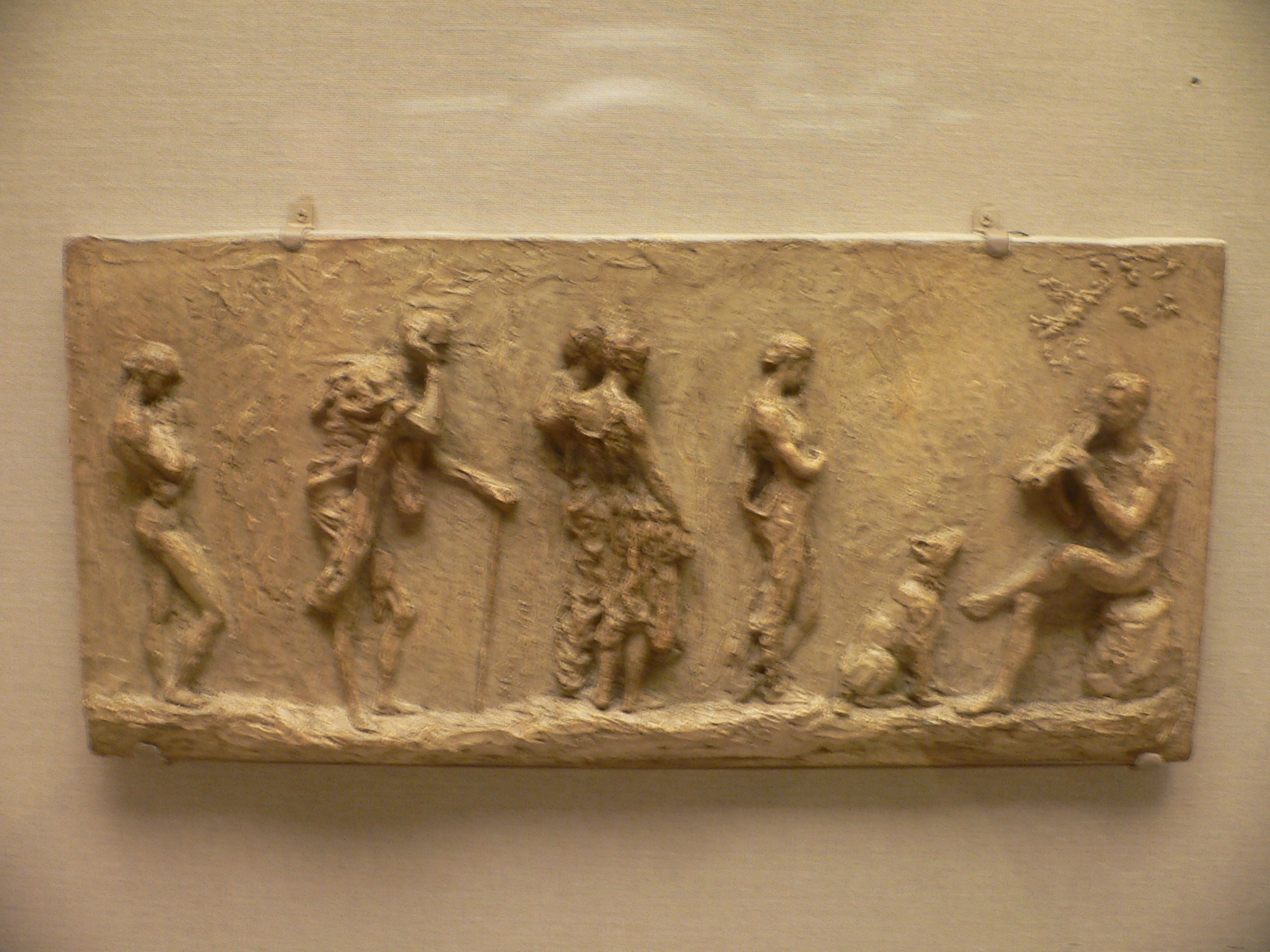
G-506. Arcadia (1883), Hirshhorn Museum and Sculpture Gallery

== See also ==
- List of works by Thomas Eakins
- 1883 in art
