= The Return of Spring =

1886 painting by William-Adolphe Bouguereau

- Le Printemps (French)
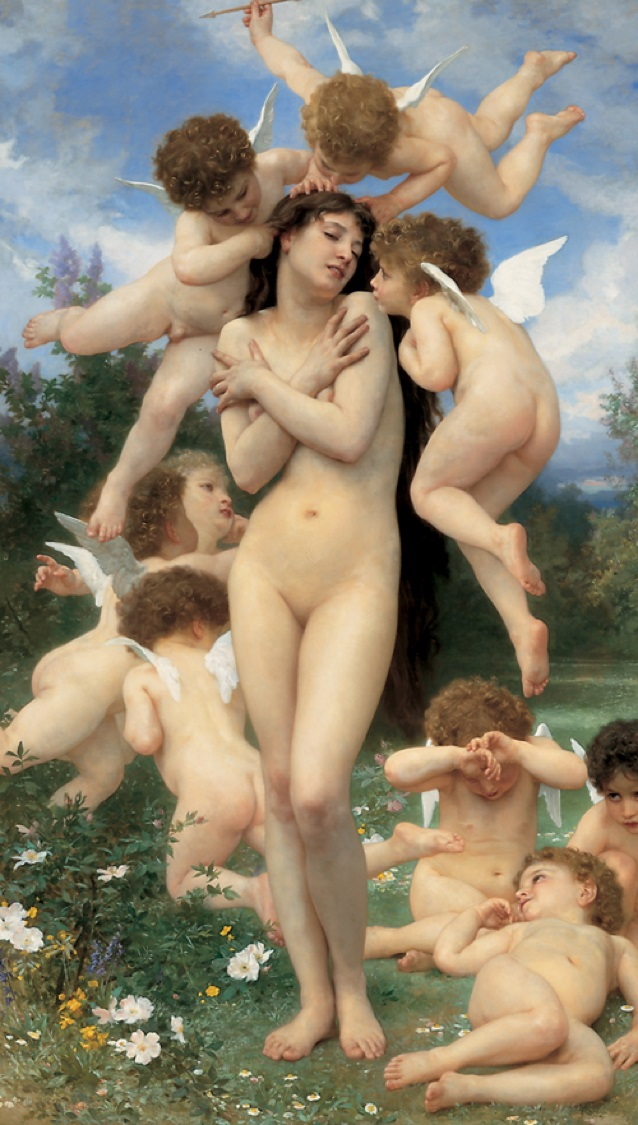
- Artist: William-Adolphe Bouguereau
- Year: 1886
- Medium: oil on canvas
- Dimensions: 201.3 cm × 117.8 cm (79.3 in × 46.4 in)
- Location: Joslyn Art Museum

The Return of Spring (French: Le Printemps) is an oil painting on canvas by the French painter William-Adolphe Bouguereau created in 1886. It is among the more well-known of his works. It is now in the collection of the Joslyn Art Museum in Omaha, Nebraska, and was acquired in 1951 as the gift of Francis T. B. Martin. The painting was brought to Omaha by George W. Lininger shortly after it was completed. Lininger was an art collector and private gallery owner who routinely opened his gallery to the public for no charge.

The painting was physically attacked twice – in 1890 and in 1976. Both times, damage was minimal. The attackers were offended by the painting's overtly sensual nudity.

A replica of the painting appeared in the ballroom scene at the Beaufort home in the 1993 film, The Age of Innocence (though the film takes place in the 1870s, years before the painting was created).

== See also ==
William-Adolphe Bouguereau gallery
