= J. Laurie Wallace =

Irish-born American painter

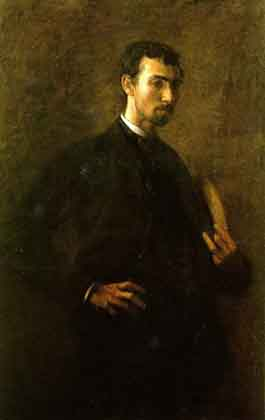
G-206. Portrait of J. Laurie Wallace (circa 1883) by Thomas Eakins, Joslyn Art Museum, Omaha, Nebraska.

John Laurie Wallace (1863 – 30 June 1953) was an Irish-born American painter.

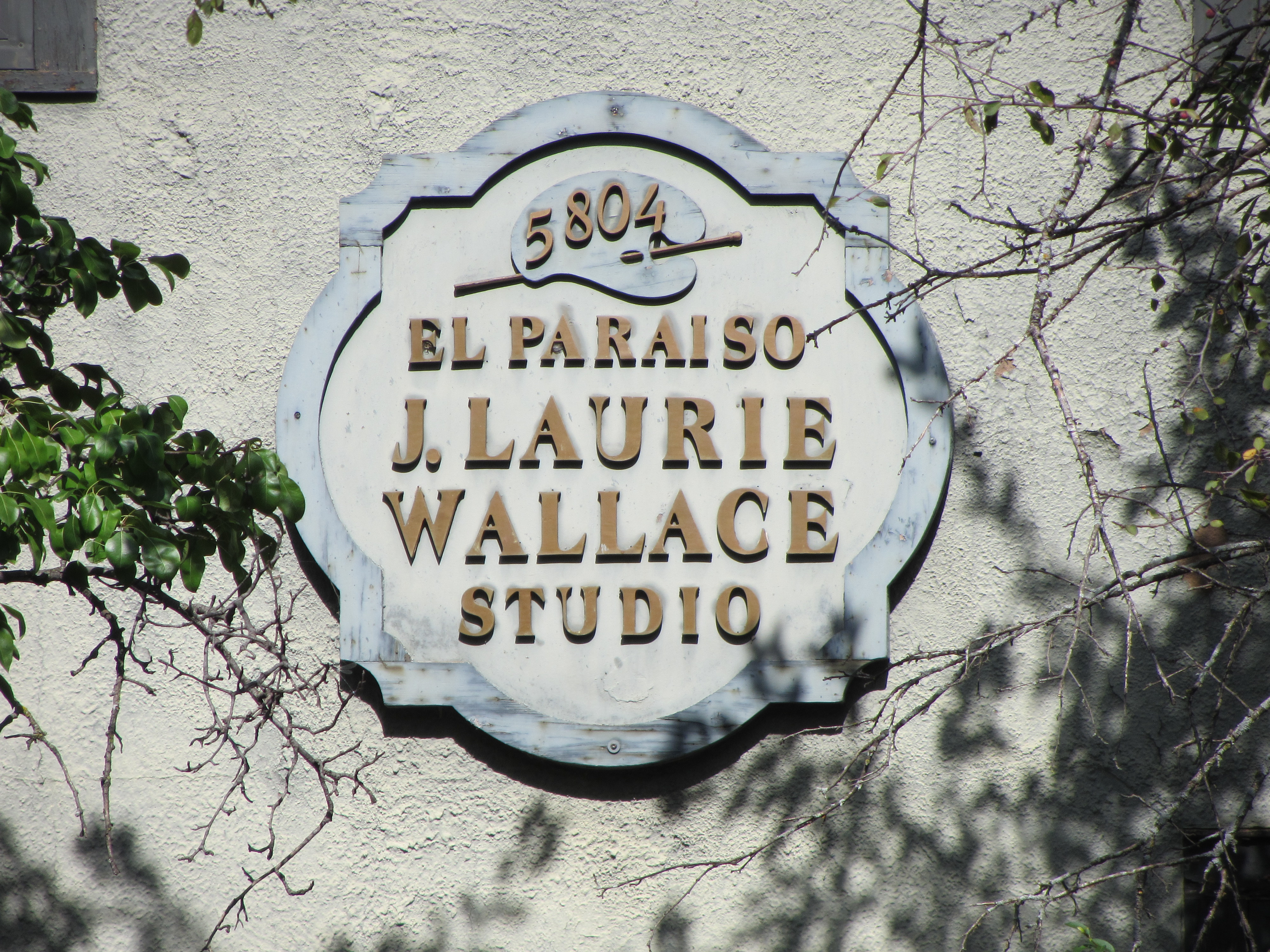
J. Laurie Wallace Studio Commemorative Plaque, 5804 Leavenworth Street, Omaha, Nebraska.

Wallace was born in Garvagh, County Londonderry, Ireland in 1863. His family immigrated to the United States when he was four years old. He studied under Thomas Eakins at the Pennsylvania Academy of the Fine Arts in Philadelphia. He posed for several of Eakins's paintings, including The Crucifixion (1880), Arcadia (1883) and The Swimming Hole (1884–85), and for dozens of photographs. In 1881, he became Eakins's assistant.

In 1891, he moved to Omaha, Nebraska, to take the position of Director of the Western Art Association. That organization soon failed, but Wallace remained in Omaha, becoming a commissioned portrait painter and professor.

One of the portraits Wallace is known to have completed was of George W. Lininger, the owner of an extensive art collection and a private art gallery in Omaha that he routinely opened to the public at no charge. The portrait of Lininger hung in Lininger's art gallery until it was closed and the contents sold in the late 1920s.

Wallace died in Omaha on 30 June 1953, aged 89. He is buried in the city's Forest Lawn Cemetery.

== In Eakins works ==
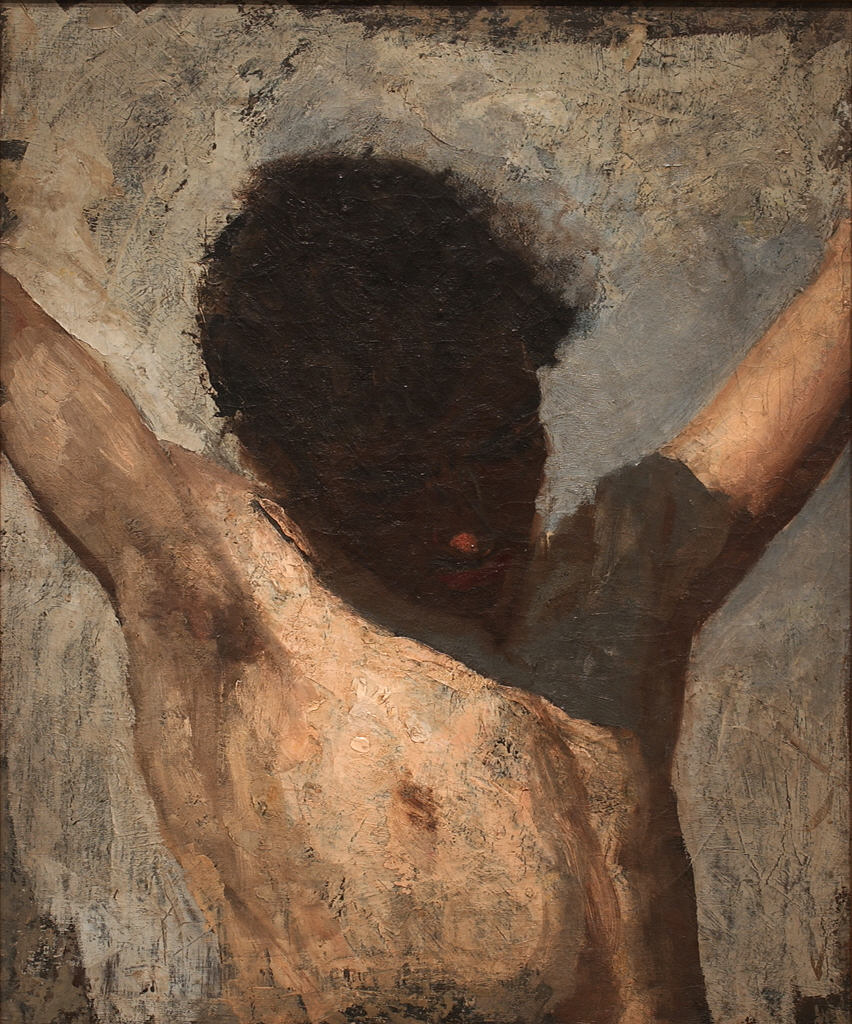
G-143. Sketch for The Crucifixion (1880)

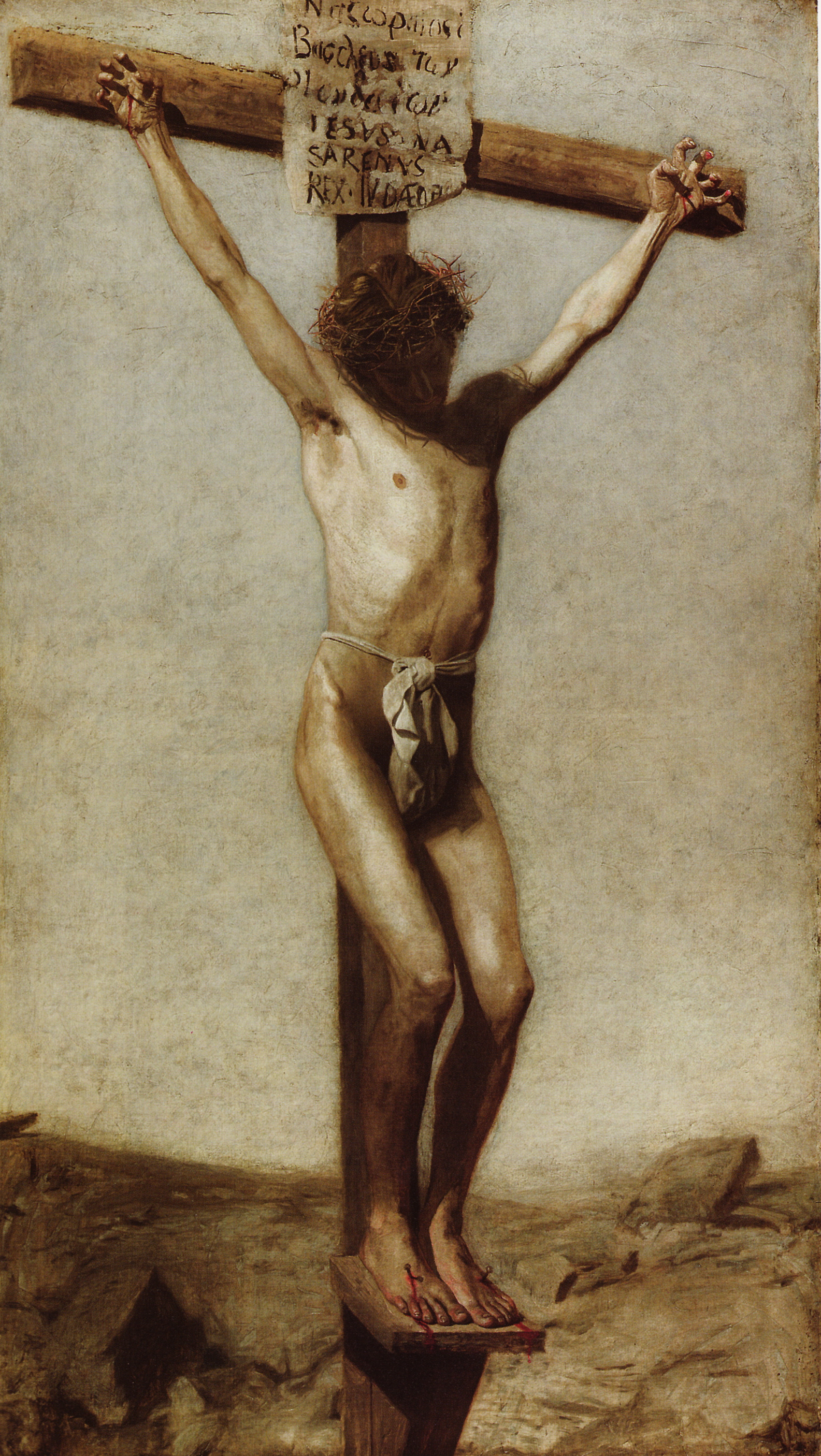
G-142. The Crucifixion (1880)

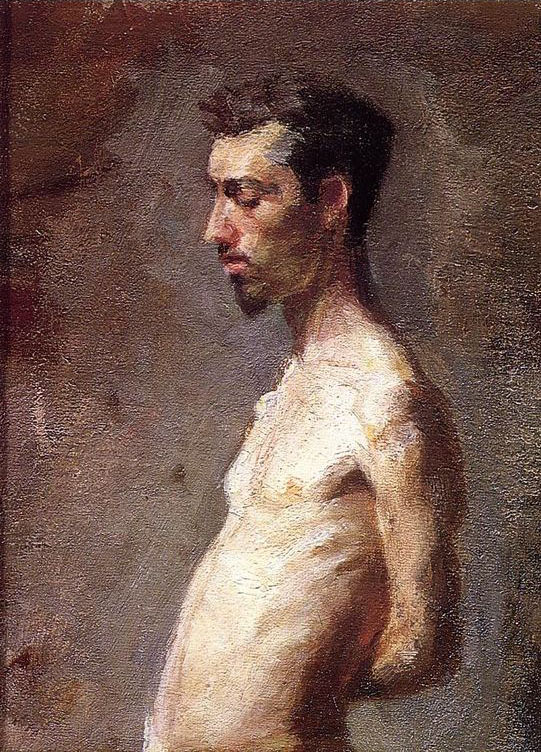
G-143a. Wallace Posing (circa 1883)

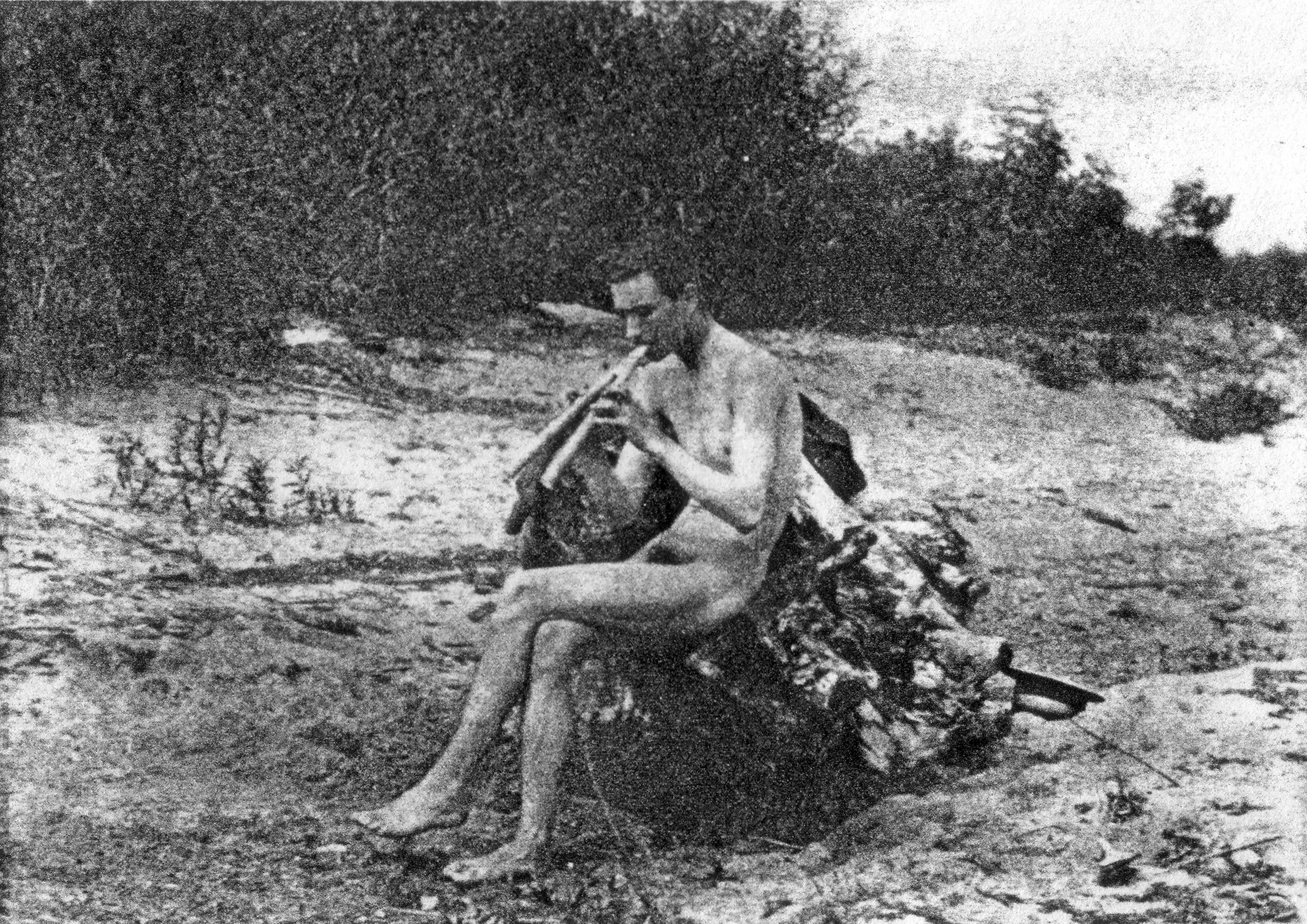
Wallace as The Piper (1883)

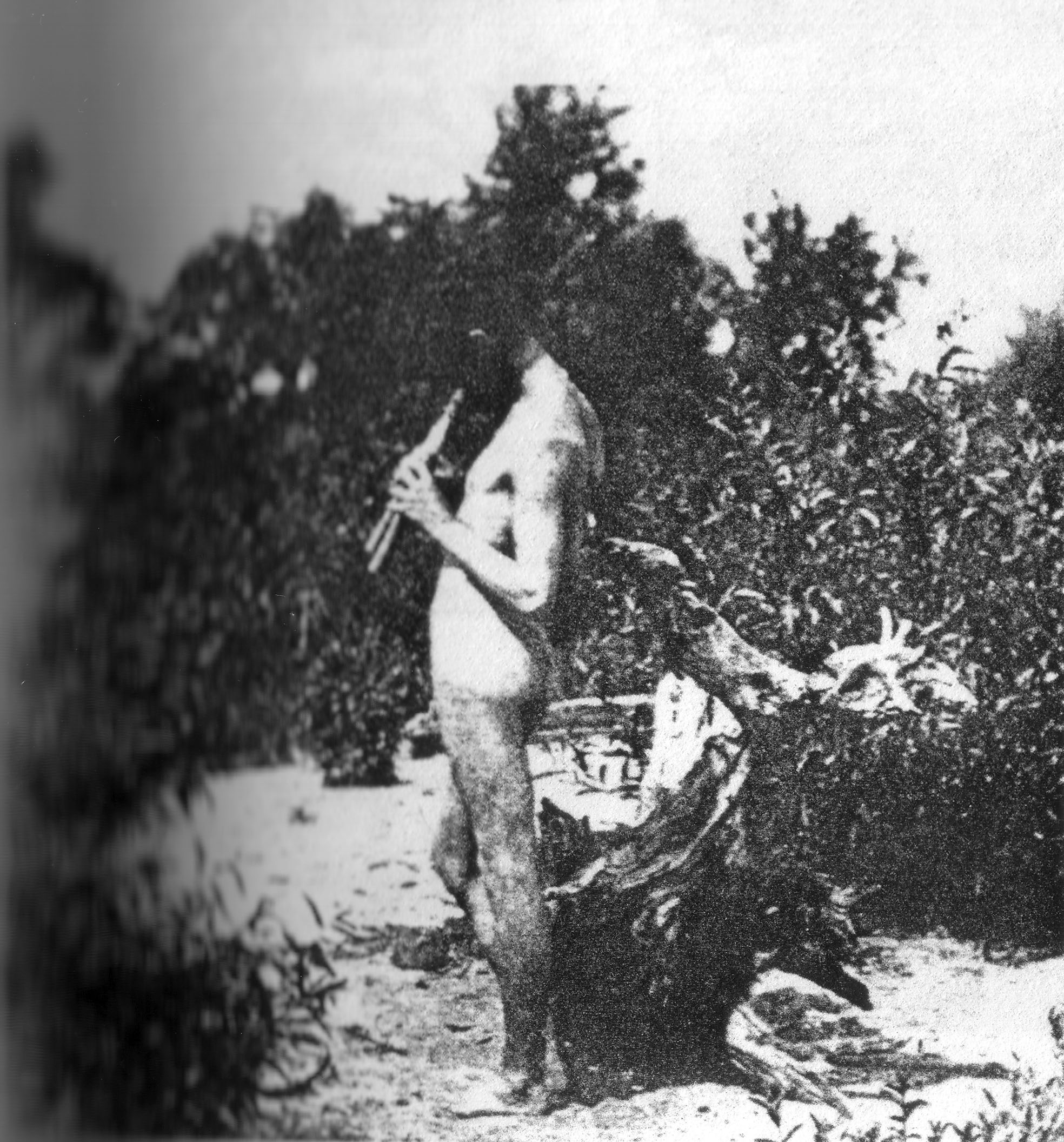
Wallace as The Piper (1883)

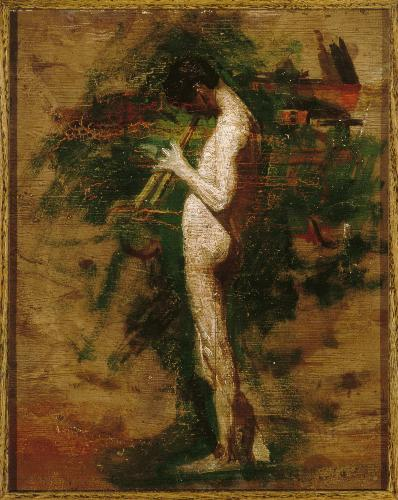
G-198. Youth Playing Pipes (1883)

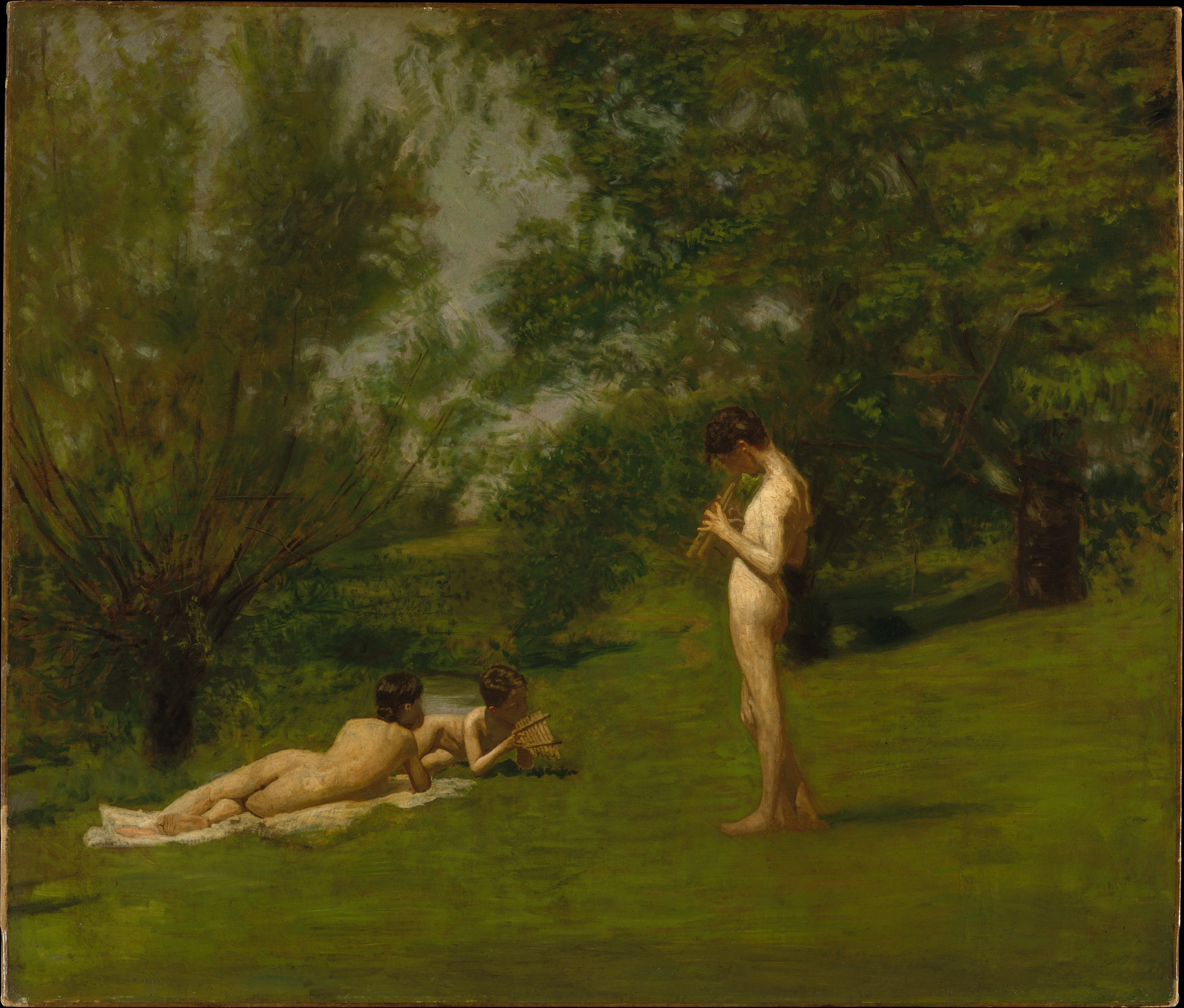
G-196. Arcadia (1883)

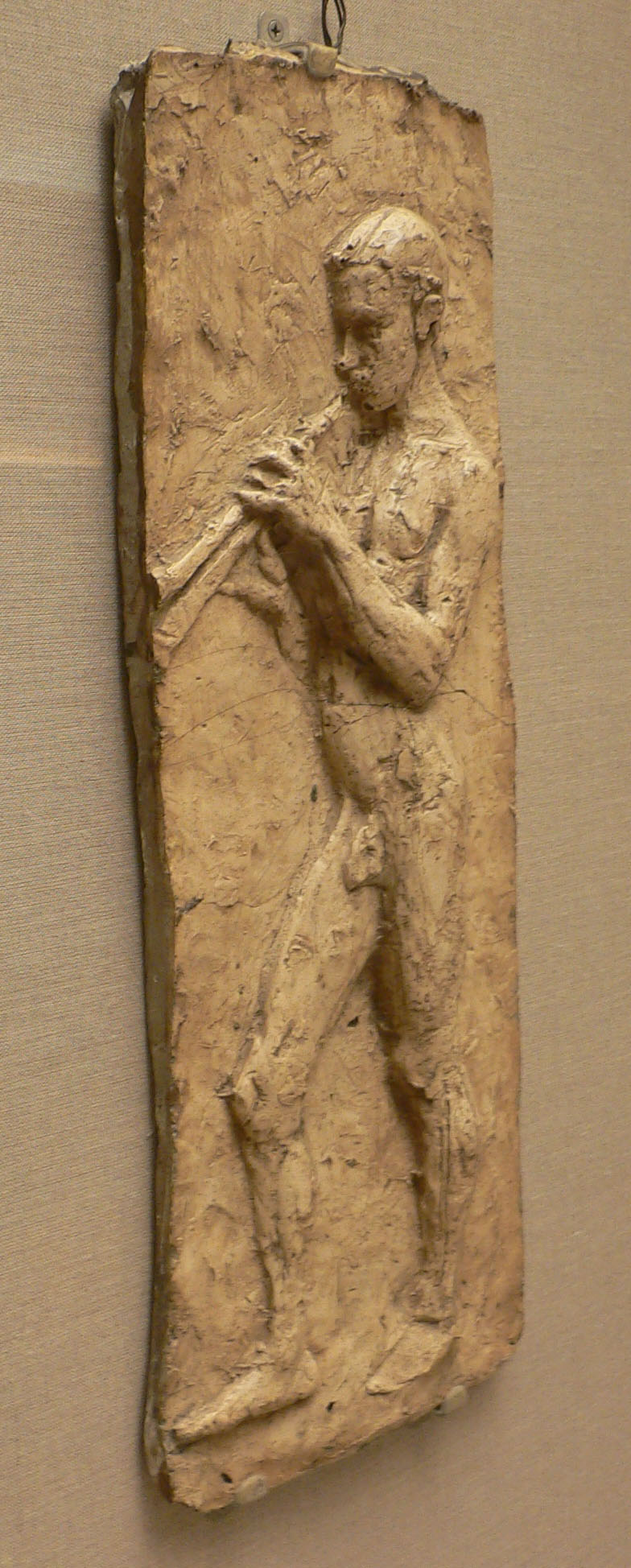
G-508. Youth Playing Pipes (1883)

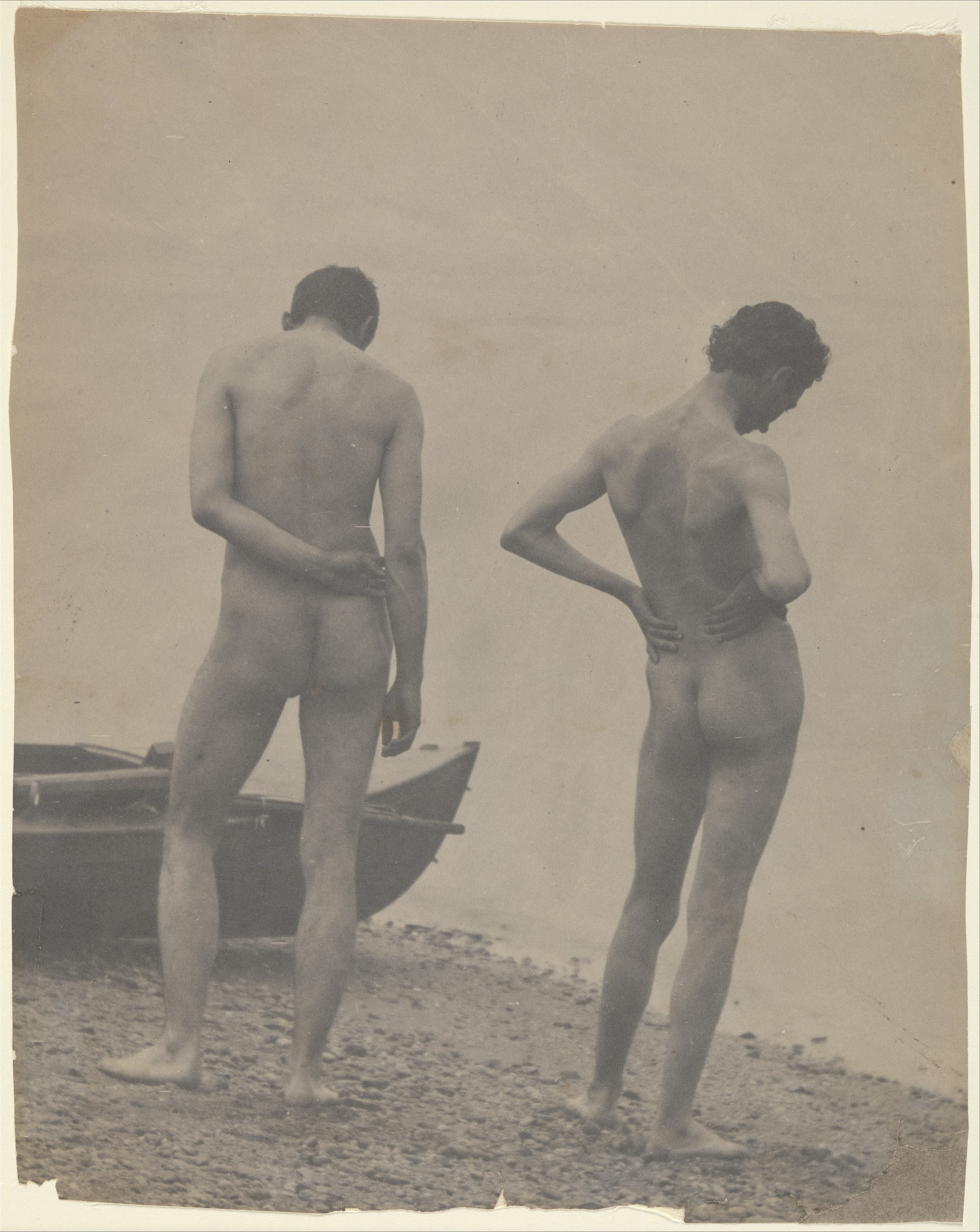
Eakins and Wallace, nude (circa 1883)

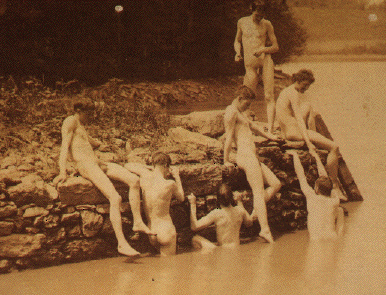
Eakins students bathing (1883)

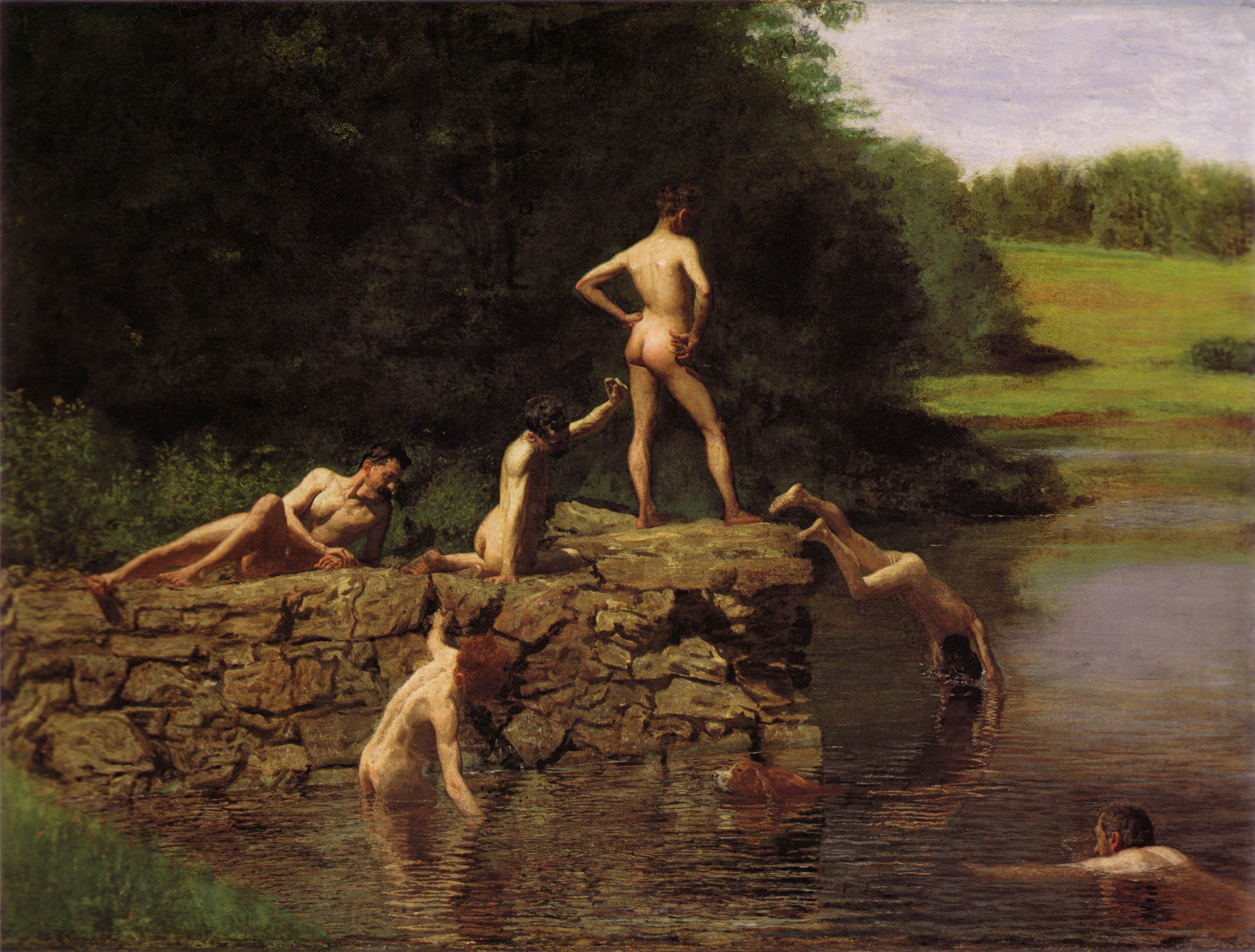
G-190. The Swimming Hole (1884–85). Wallace is the standing man with hands on his hips
