= George W. Lininger =

George W. Lininger, 1854-1904 Nebraskans

George W. Lininger (1834-1907), was an implement dealer, art collector, private gallery owner, and civic leader in Omaha, Nebraska, USA. Many of the art works Lininger collected became the foundation of the permanent collection at the Joslyn Art Museum in Omaha.

== Early life ==
George Washington Lininger was born on 14 December 1834 in Chambersburg, Franklin County, Pennsylvania, the son of David Lininger and Elizabeth Betz. His father was a tailor by trade, and later a school teacher and a miller. The family moved to Peru in LaSalle County, Illinois, when Lininger was a boy. It was in Illinois that Lininger began selling agricultural implements, first as a retailer and later as a jobber. In 1868, Lininger relocated to Council Bluffs, Iowa, and opened the first agricultural and vehicle jobbing operation on the Missouri River, under the name Shugart & Lininger. In 1874, he moved his business across the river to Omaha. After arriving in Omaha, Lininger purchased a large brick Second Empire mansion at 18th and Davenport Streets. The house had been built in the late 1860s by George M. Mills. Omaha remained Lininger's home for the rest of his life.

== Art collection ==
Lininger's art collection had its beginnings with four paintings he bought from a street peddler in Council Bluffs, Iowa. This spur of the moment purchase inspired Lininger's lifelong hobby of art collecting. Of this purchase Lininger would later muse, "I then made up my mind that when I had money enough I'd fill my home with art."

Lininger began collecting in earnest on extensive trips to Europe. When the collection was too large to be contained in his home, Lininger built a gallery extension onto his home. He hired the firm of Mendelssohn, Fisher and Lawrie to design the addition. Constructed of brick and terra cotta in the Italian Renaissance style, it was ringed by bands of grey stone. A row of niches to display sculpture were fashioned into the wall facing the street. The gallery dimensions were 35 feet by 70 feet, with a ceiling of 20 feet. The room was illuminated by a large skylight. The floor was set with inlaid tile, marble wainscoting surrounded the room, and mahogany and bronze completed the trimmings. The total cost of the gallery was estimated at $15,000.

In 1889, Lininger opened the gallery to the public. Baedeker's travel guide listed the gallery as one of the show places in this part of the country. During the Trans-Mississippi Exposition in Omaha in 1898, it is estimated that 20,000 people toured Lininger's gallery.

The collection Lininger accrued was estimated to include about 300 works, with about 60 paintings by Old Masters. The collection included statuary, bric-a-brac, curios, and Egyptian mummies. Two of the most famous paintings in Lininger's collection were Guido Reni's 1605 painting of "David with the Head of Goliath", and "The Return of Spring" by William-Adolphe Bouguereau.

In attempting to explain why he opened his private gallery to the public, Lininger once said, "What is an art gallery for but to let your friends see it? And I consider any one who has love for art as my friend and I am glad of the opportunity of inviting him to my gallery."

After Lininger's death, his widow continued opening the art gallery to the public. This practice continued into the 1920s, until Mrs. Lininger's age no longer allowed her to provide the supervision required. After Mrs. Lininger's 1927 death, her will called for the gallery to be closed and the art works sold. Many of the works were purchased locally, some were given to the University of Nebraska and the remainder were sent to eastern art dealers for sale there. By the time the Lininger's only daughter, Florence Lininger Haller, died in 1929, the art work had all been sold. In the early 1930s, Lininger's former house and gallery were razed.

Over time, many pieces from Lininger's original collection have made their way into the permanent collection of the Joslyn Art Museum. In 1972, the Joslyn Art Museum mounted a two-part show entitled "The Lininger Era". The show included a reproduction of Lininger's art gallery and the display of 40 pieces from Lininger's original collection.

In addition to collecting art, Lininger also nurtured artists. In 1890, Lininger agreed to pay for Gutzon Borglum (who later carved Mount Rushmore) to travel to Europe for two to three years to study art. In thanking Lininger for his generosity Borglum vowed, "I shall work hard with the hope of doing something that may reflect credit upon the friends who have expressed so much faith in my abilities."

== Civic leader ==
In addition to sharing his art with the public, Lininger also freely gave his time and energy to civic duties. He was a representative to the twenty-eighth session of the Nebraska State Legislature, as a representative for Douglas County, when it convened on January 4, 1887. He was also an Omaha city councilman. Lininger was a member and the first president of the Park Board, and a member of the Omaha Commercial Club.

Lininger was a member of the Masonic order, serving as the Grand Master of Nebraska in 1877. He was instrumental in founding the Masonic Orphans' Home in Plattsmouth, Nebraska, in 1903. Nebraska Lodge No. 268 is named after George W. Lininger.

== Personal life ==
In 1857, Lininger married Caroline Marion Newman at Peru, Illinois. The couple had two children, a son and a daughter, but only their daughter, Florence, survived to adulthood.

Lininger was a friend of the Omaha-based portrait artist, J. Laurie Wallace. A portrait of Lininger by Wallace hung in Lininger's art gallery.

After an extended illness of several months, Lininger died on 9 June 1907 in his home in Omaha. His body lay in state in his beloved art gallery for two days before burial in Forest Lawn Cemetery in Omaha.
