= Culture of Argentina =

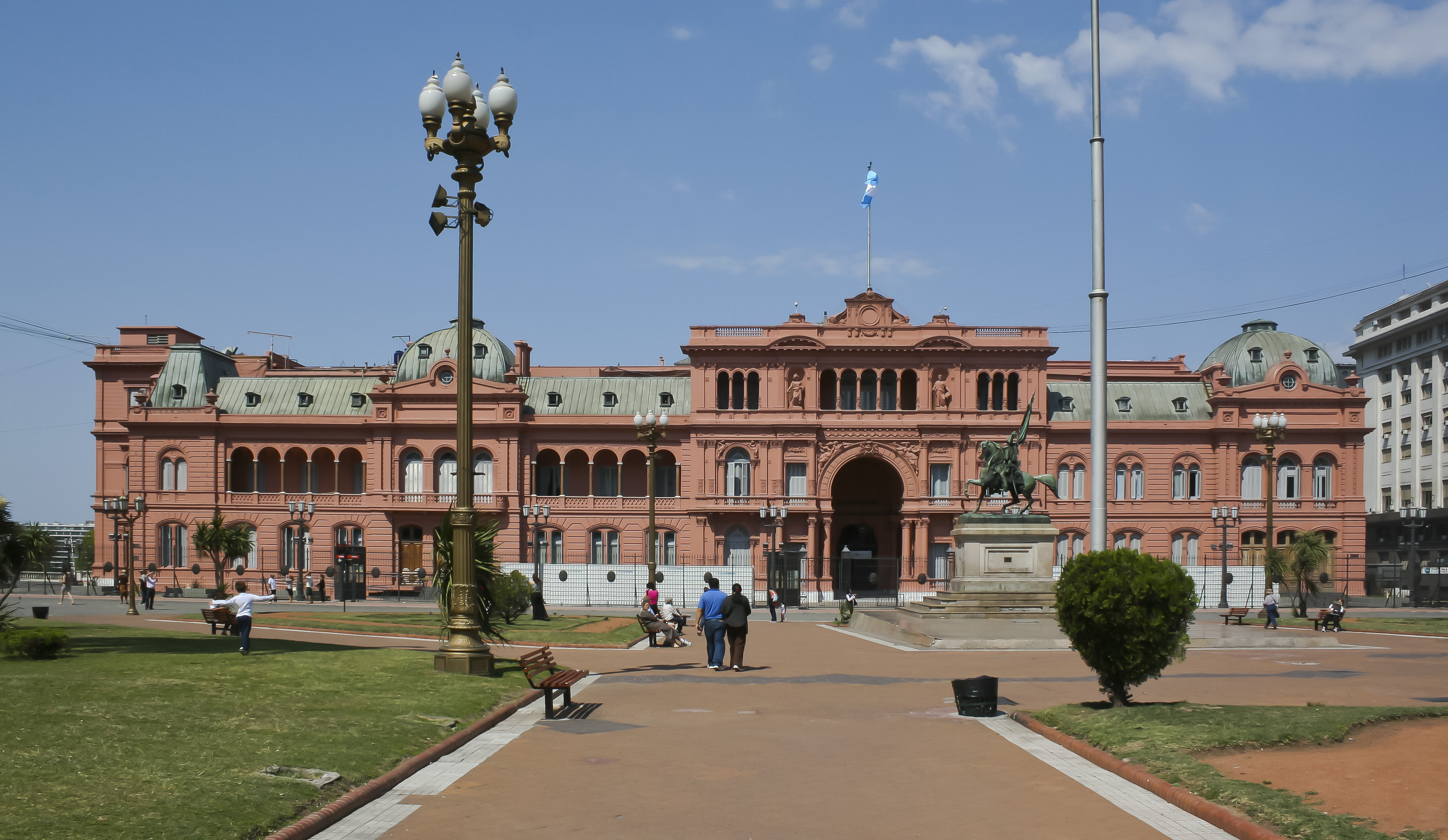
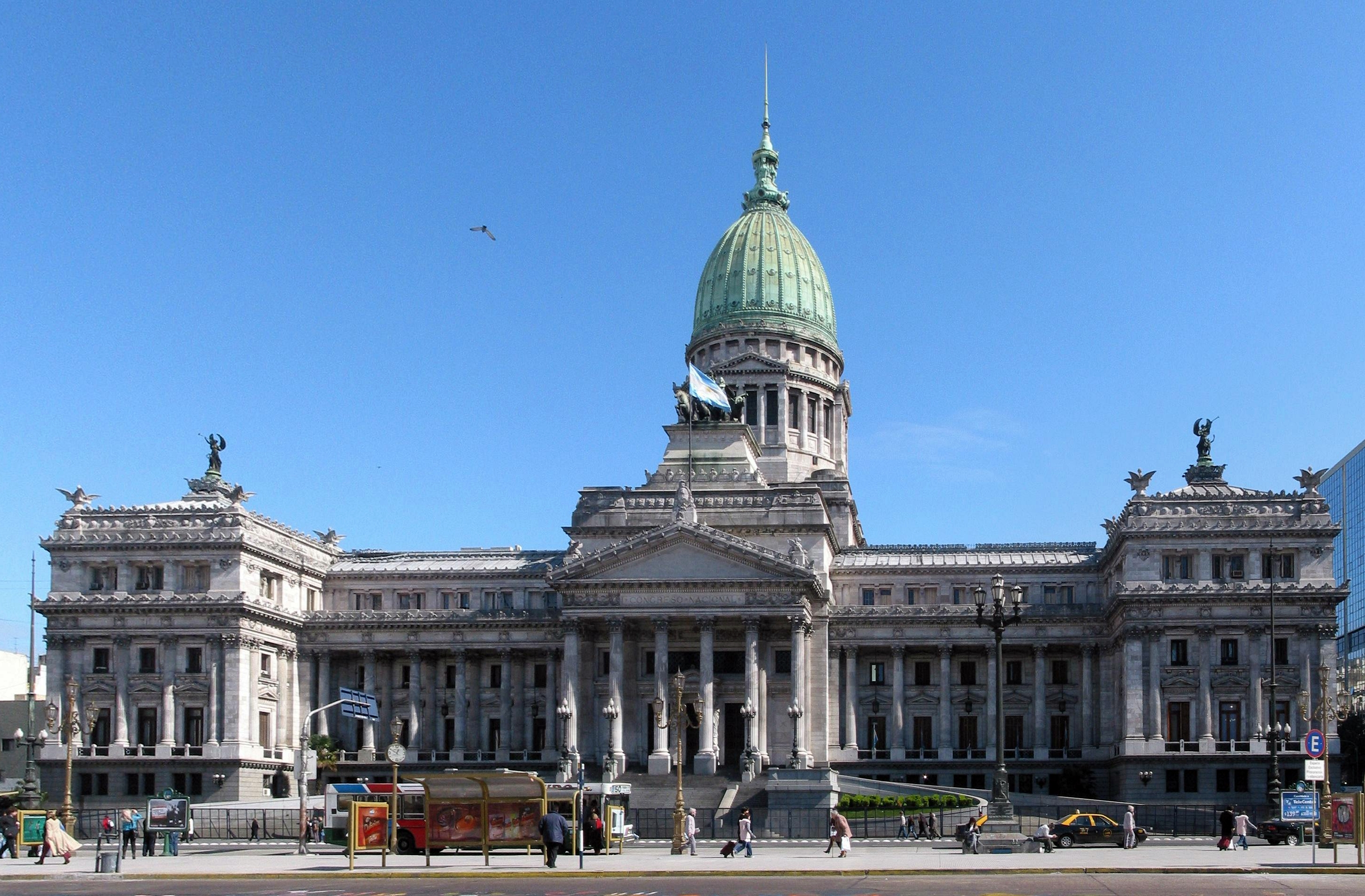
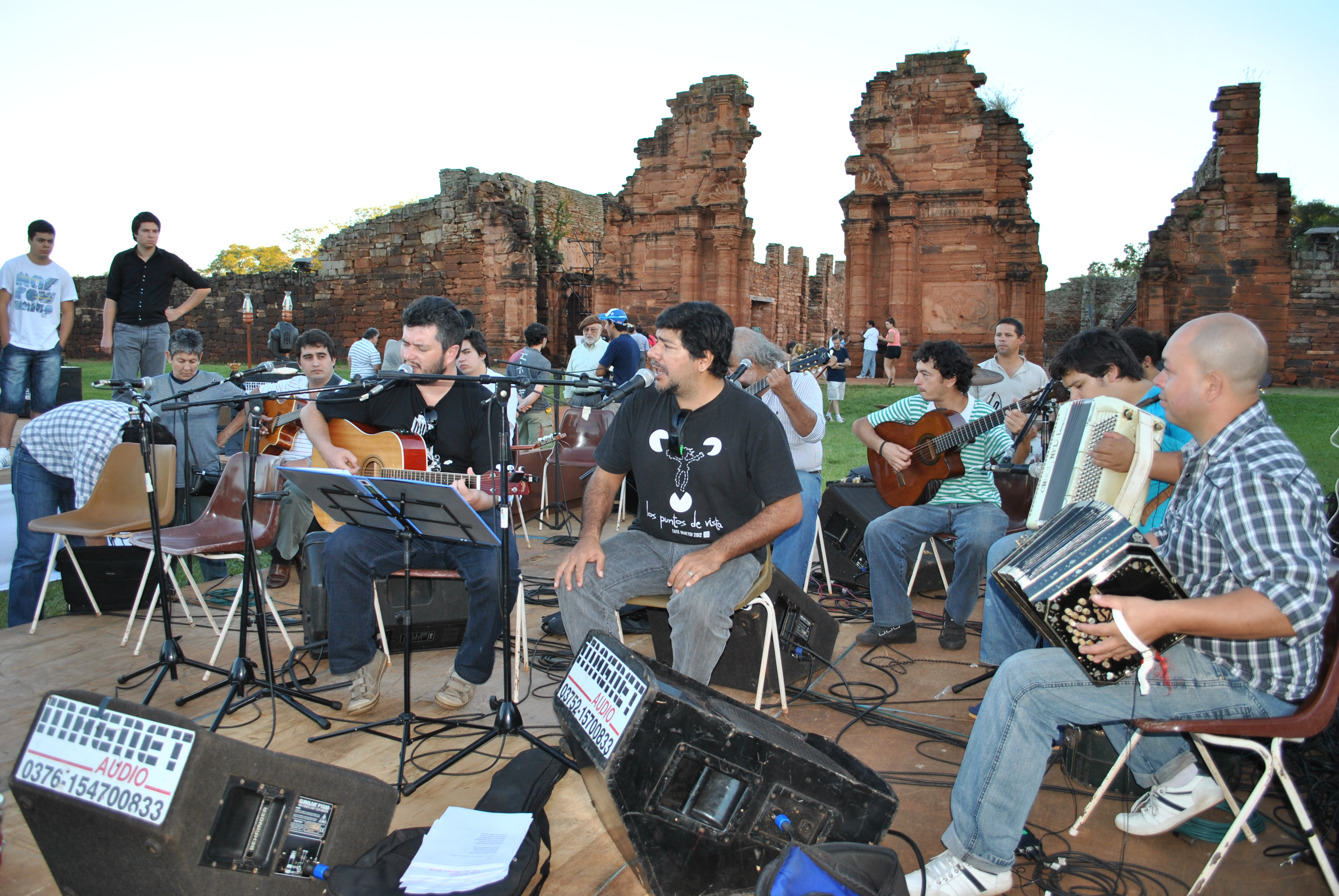
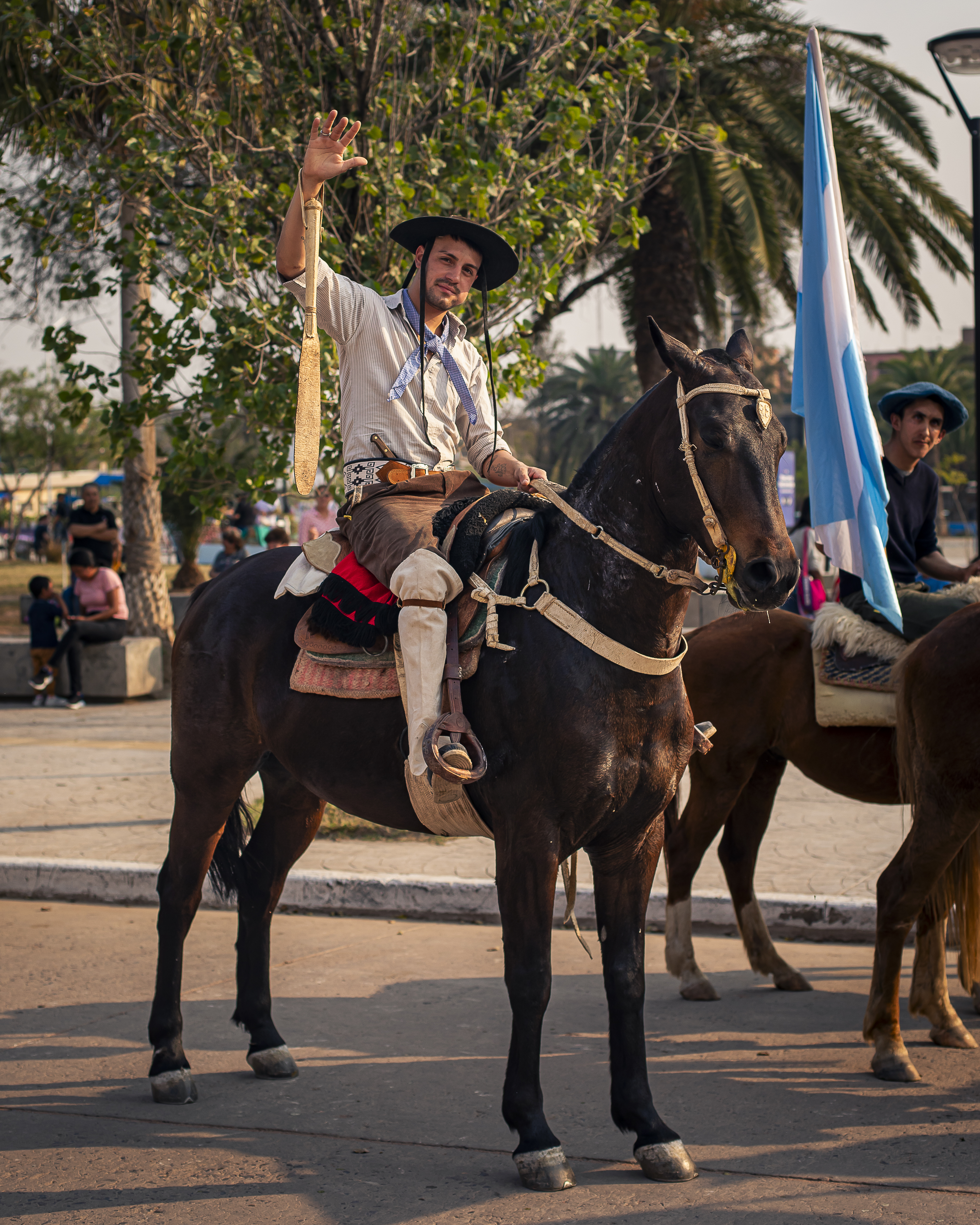
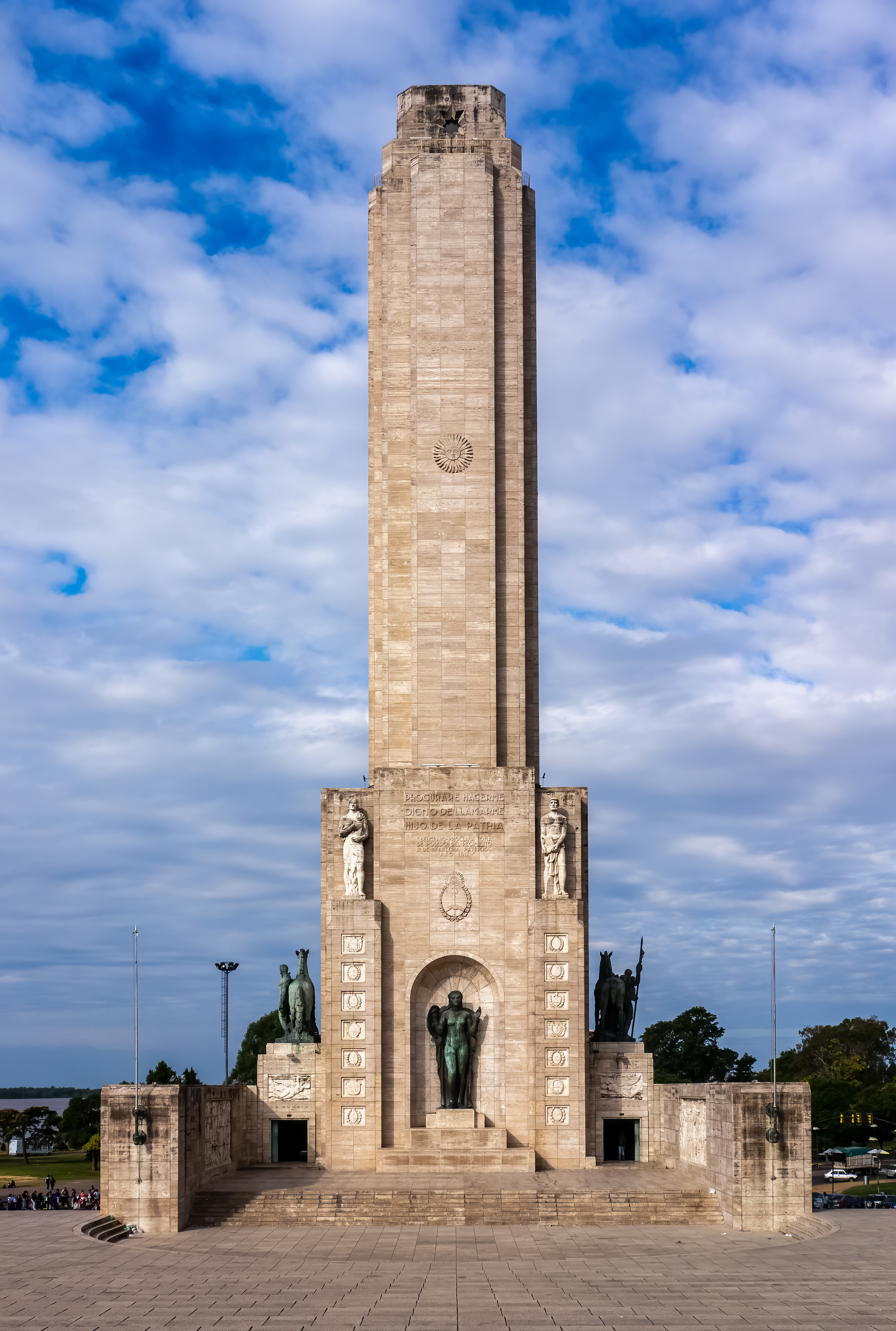
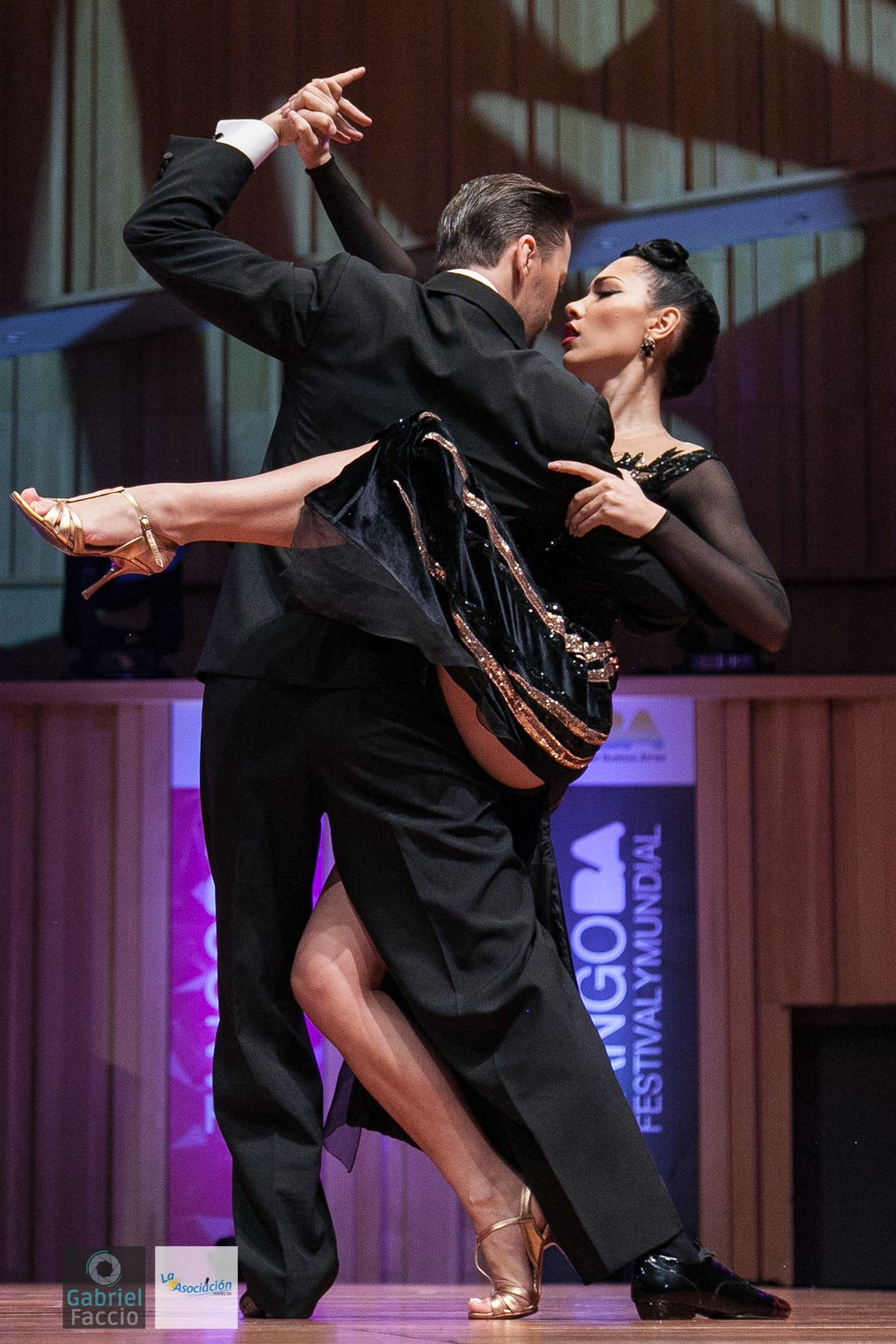
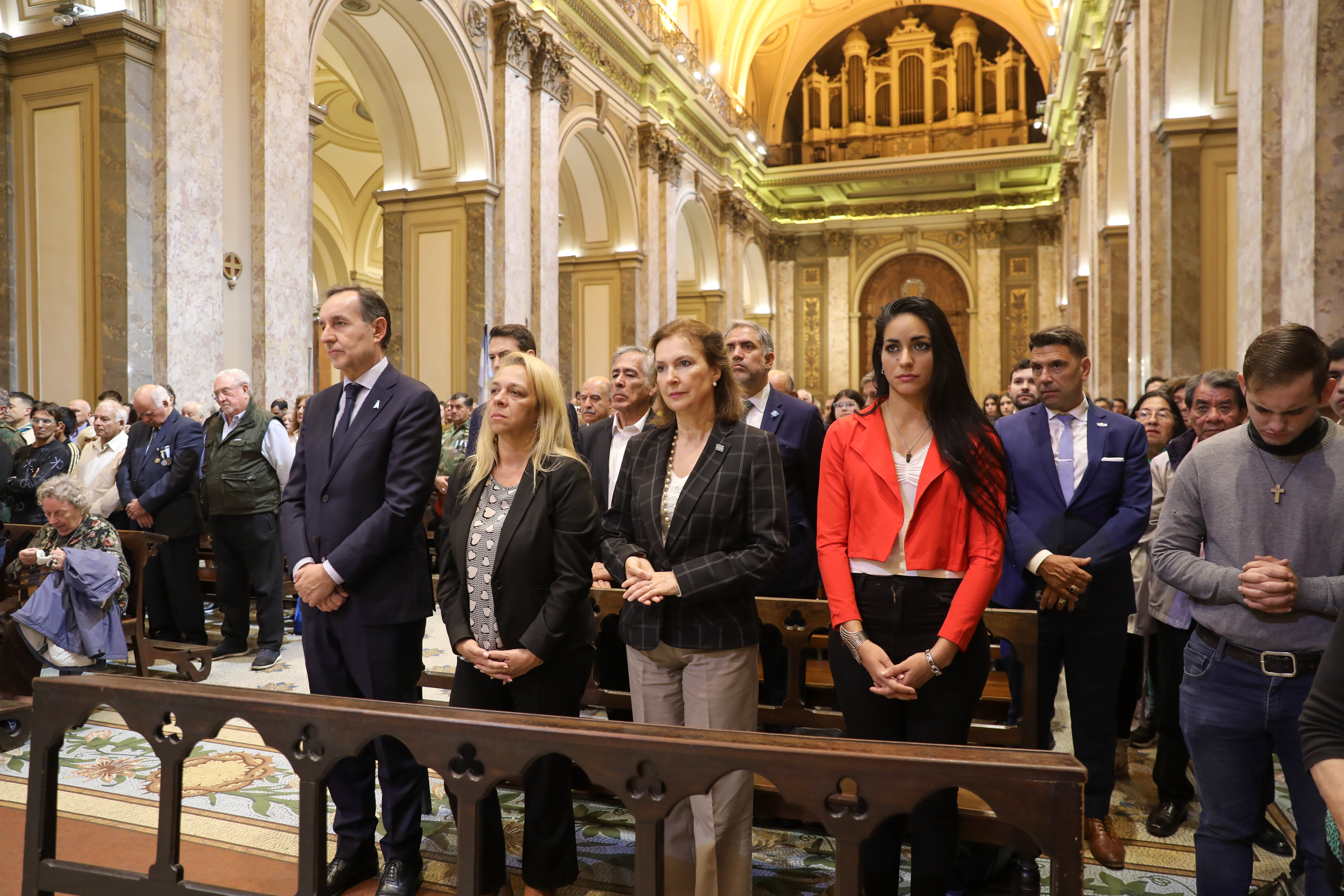
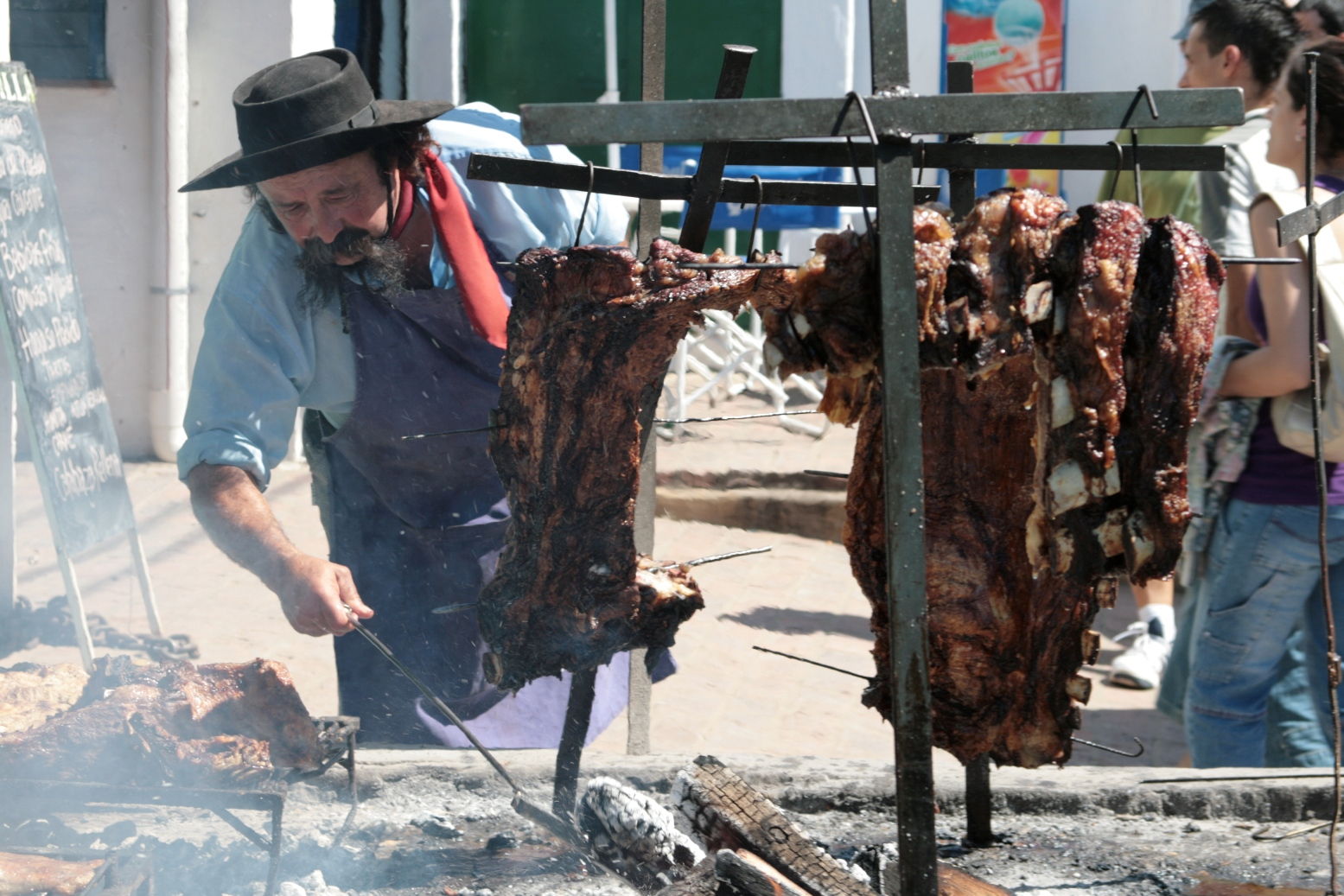
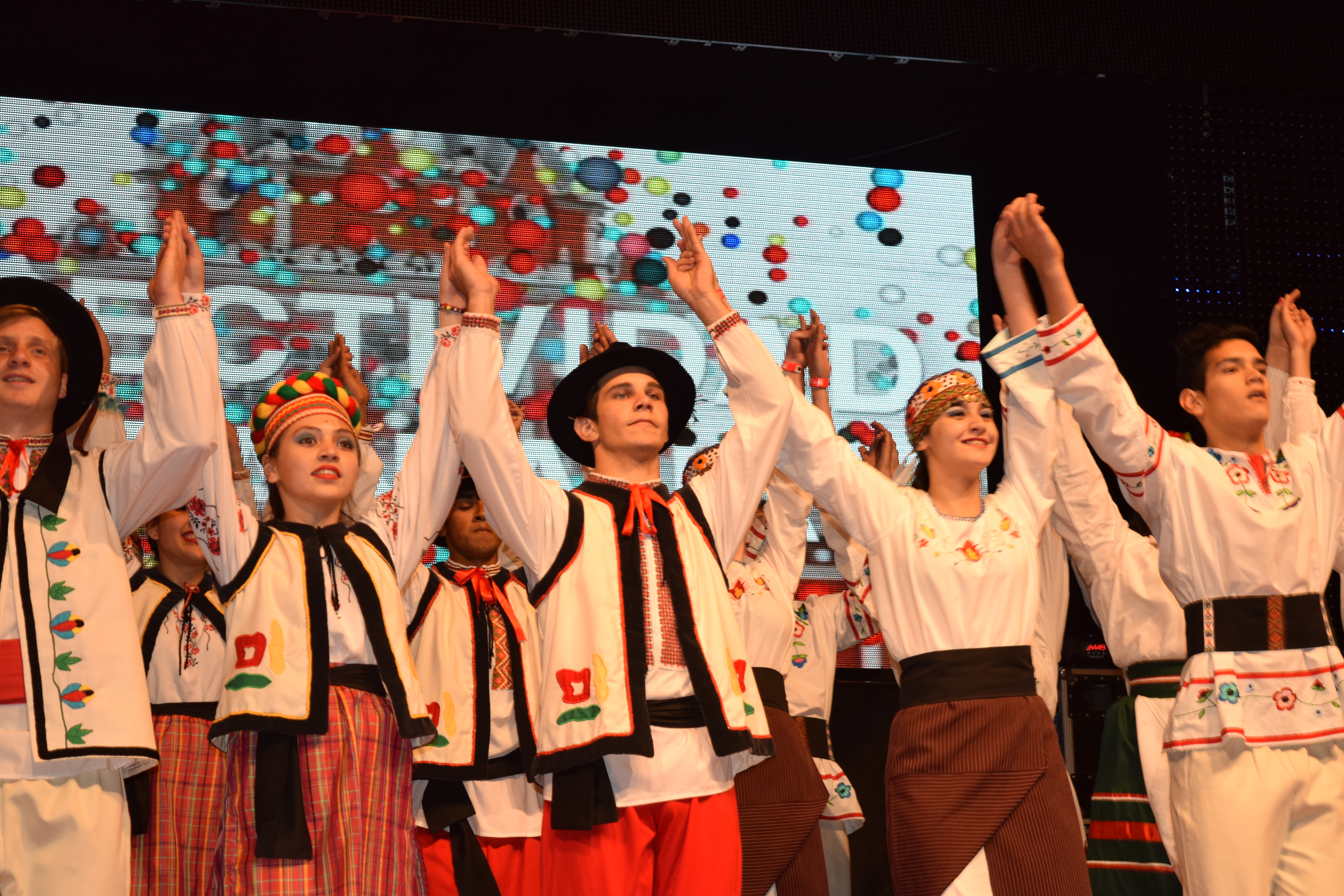
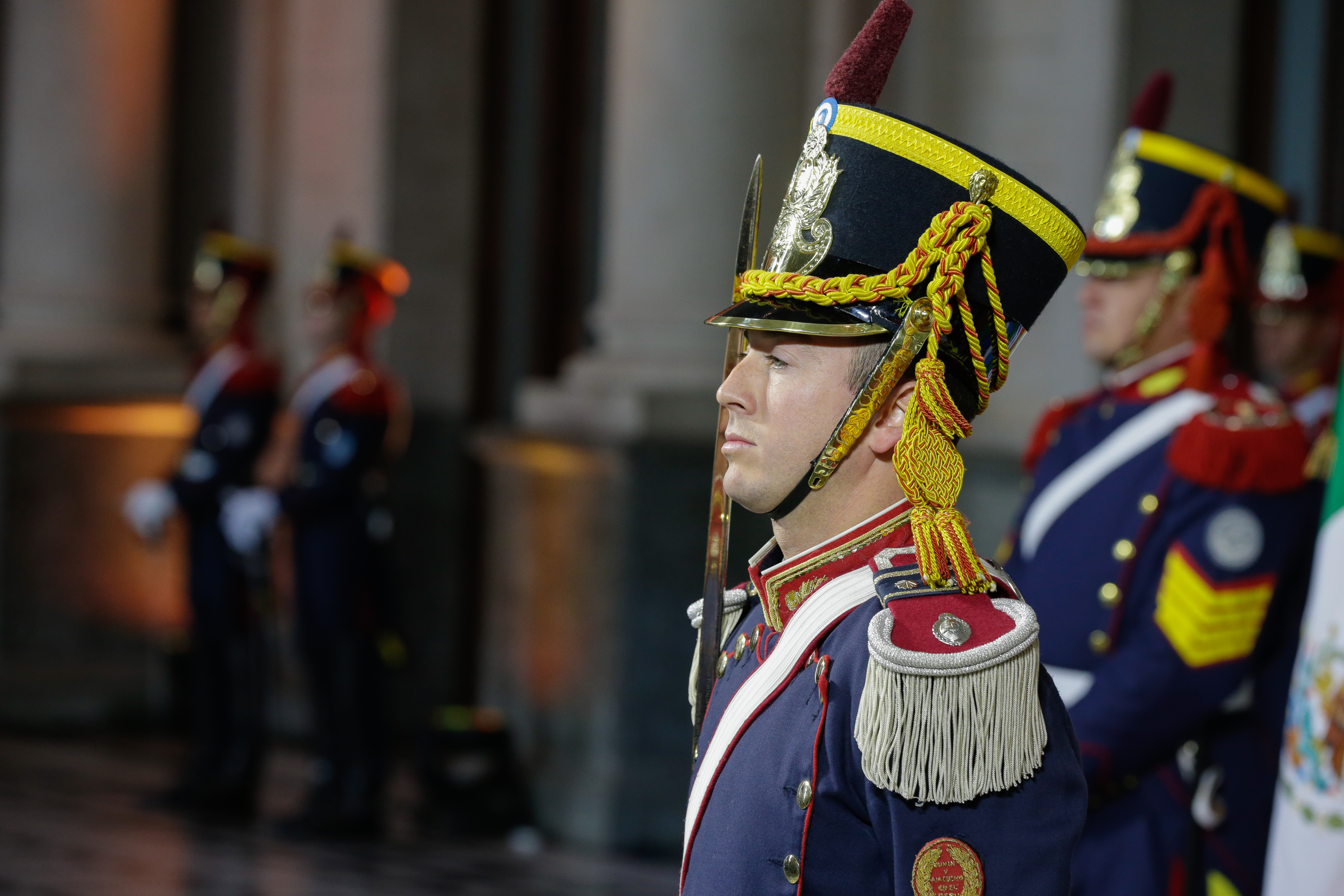
From top, left to right: Casa Rosada, Palace of the Argentine National Congress, Chamamé in San Ignacio Miní, Gaucho, National Flag Memorial, Tango, Catholic Mass, Asado, Immigrant's Festival and Mounted Grenadiers.

The culture of Argentina is as varied as the country's geography and is composed of a mix of ethnic groups. Modern Argentine culture has been influenced largely by the Spanish colonial period and the 19th/20th century European immigration (mainly Italian and Spanish), so it is strongly linked to the Western world and its Catholic religious tradition. It has also been influenced to a lesser extent by French, Indigenous, German, Basque, Irish, Arab and Polish cultures, particularly in the fields of music and art. Buenos Aires, its cultural capital, is largely characterized by both the prevalence of people of Southern European descent, and of European styles in architecture. Museums, cinemas, and galleries are abundant in all of the large urban centers, as well as traditional establishments such as literary bars, or bars offering live music of a variety of music genres.

An Argentine writer reflected on the nature of the culture of Argentina as follows:

With the primitive Hispanic American reality fractured in La Plata Basin due to immigration, its inhabitants have come to be somewhat dual with all the dangers but also with all the advantages of that condition: because of our European roots, we deeply link the nation with the enduring values of the Old World; because of our condition of Americans we link ourselves to the rest of the continent, through the folklore of the interior and the old Castilian that unifies us, feeling somehow the vocation of the Patria Grande San Martín and Bolívar once imagined.

— Ernesto Sabato, La cultura en la encrucijada nacional (1976)

== Language ==
The spoken languages of Argentina number at least 40, although Spanish is dominant. Others include native and other immigrant languages; some languages are extinct and others are endangered, spoken by elderly people whose descendants do not speak the languages.

Spoken Argentine Spanish about the country's geography.

The most prevalent dialect is Rioplatense, also known as "Argentine Spanish", whose speakers are located primarily in the basin of the Río de la Plata. Argentines are amongst the few Spanish-speaking countries (like Uruguay, Nicaragua, El Salvador, and Honduras) that almost universally use what is known as voseo – the use of the pronoun vos instead of tú (Spanish for "you").

In many of the central and north-eastern areas of the country, the "rolling r" takes on a similar sound as the one both ll and y take in the more general Rioplatense dialect ('zh' – a voiced palatal fricative sound, similar to the "s" in the English pronunciation of the word "vision").

The Southern Quechua language is spoken by 0.4% of the population, mostly Bolivian immigrants who have arrived in recent years. There are 70,000 estimated speakers in Salta Province. The language is also known as Central Bolivian Quechua, which has six dialects. It is classified as a Quechua II language, and is referred to as Quechua IIC by linguists.

The Guaraní language is also spoken, mainly near the border with Paraguay, and is an co-official language in the province of Corrientes.

The Welsh language is the co-official language of the province of Chubut. This province was strongly influenced by Welsh migration and is home to the largest community outside the British Isles. The language is spoken in the Patagonian Welsh dialect.

The Afrikaans language, unlike the previous one, does not have co-official status in Chubut, that language arrived with the Boer migration between 1902 and 1908. The language is spoken in the Patagonian Afrikaans dialect.

The German language does not have co-official status but is spoken mainly by the descendants of the Germans, this being the 4th largest ancestry, it is spoken mainly in the provinces of Entre Ríos, Santa Fe, Córdoba, La Pampa, Buenos Aires, Río Negro and Misiones.

Other prominent languages without co-official status in Argentina are Polish, Ukrainian, Galician, Basque, Russian, Armenian, Yiddish, French, Ladino, English, Mapuche, among others.

== Literature ==
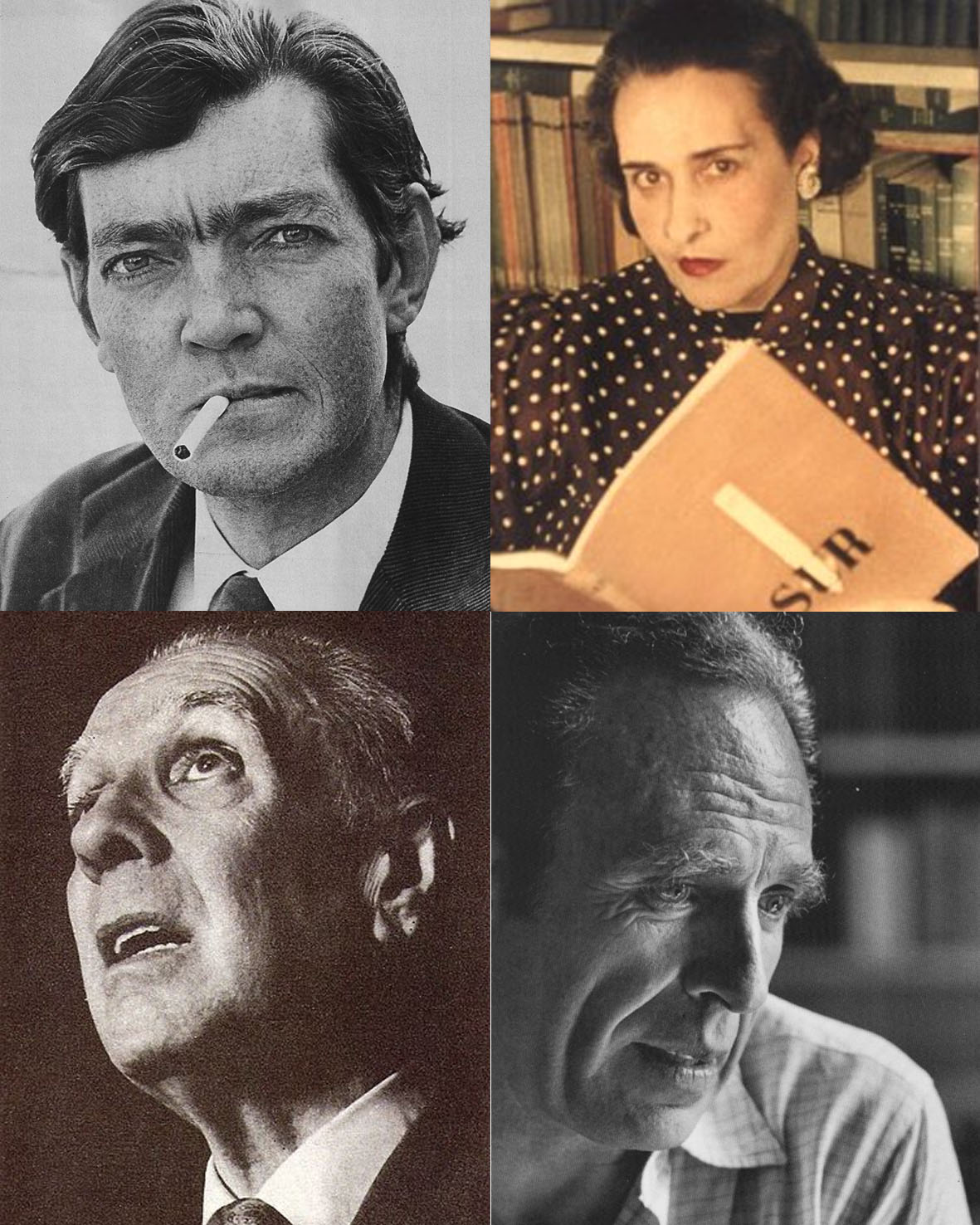
Argentine literary figures: Julio Cortázar, Victoria Ocampo, Jorge Luis Borges and Adolfo Bioy Casares.

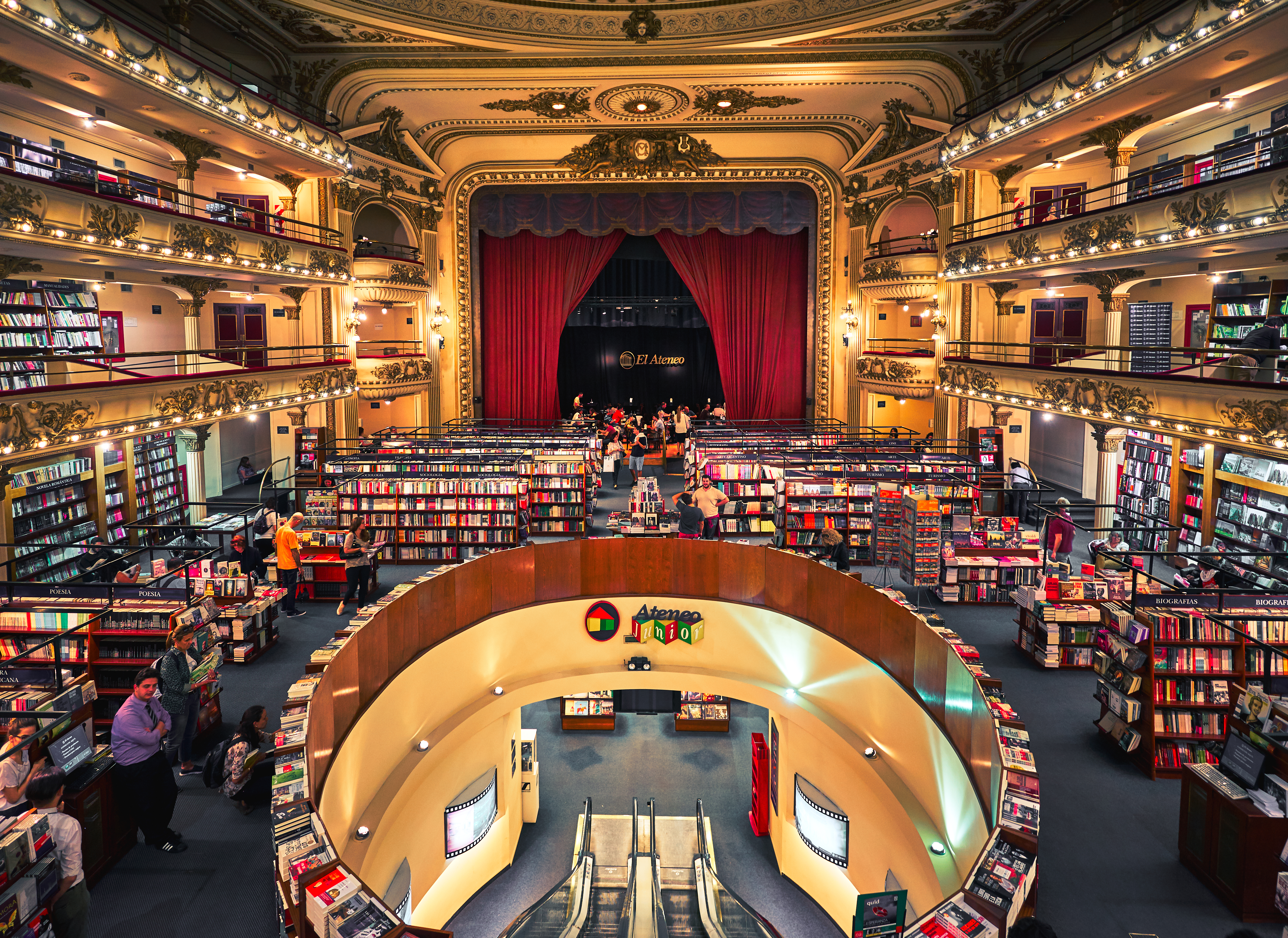
El Ateneo Grand Splendid in Buenos Aires.

Argentina has a detailed literary history, as well as one of the region's most active publishing industries. Argentine writers have figured prominently in Latin American literature, since becoming a fully united entity in the 1850s, with a strong constitution and a defined nation-building plan. The struggle between the Federalists (who favored a loose confederation of provinces based on rural conservatism) and the Unitarians (pro-liberalism and advocates of a strong central government that would encourage European immigration), set the tone for Argentine literature of the time.

The ideological divide between gaucho epic Martín Fierro by José Hernández, and Facundo by Domingo Faustino Sarmiento, is a great example. Hernández, a federalist, was opposed to the centralizing, modernizing, and Europeanizing tendencies. Sarmiento wrote in support of immigration as the only way to save Argentina from becoming subject to the rule of a small number of dictatorial caudillo families, arguing such immigrants would make Argentina more modern and open to Western European influences, and therefore a more prosperous society.

Argentine literature of that period was fiercely nationalist. It was followed by the modernist movement, which emerged in France in the late 19th century, and this period in turn was followed by vanguardism, with Ricardo Güiraldes as an important reference. Jorge Luis Borges, its most acclaimed writer, found new ways of looking at the modern world in metaphor and philosophical debate, and his influence has extended to writers all over the globe. Borges is most famous for his works in short stories such as Ficciones and The Aleph.

Some of the nation's notable writers, poets, and intellectuals include: Juan Bautista Alberdi, Jorge Luis Borges, Roberto Arlt, Enrique Banchs, Adolfo Bioy Casares, Silvina Bullrich, Eugenio Cambaceres, Julio Cortázar, Esteban Echeverría, Leopoldo Lugones, Eduardo Mallea, Ezequiel Martínez Estrada, Tomás Eloy Martínez, Victoria Ocampo, Manuel Puig, Ernesto Sabato, Osvaldo Soriano, Alfonsina Storni, María Elena Walsh and Oliverio Girondo.

== Visual arts ==
=== Painting and sculpture ===
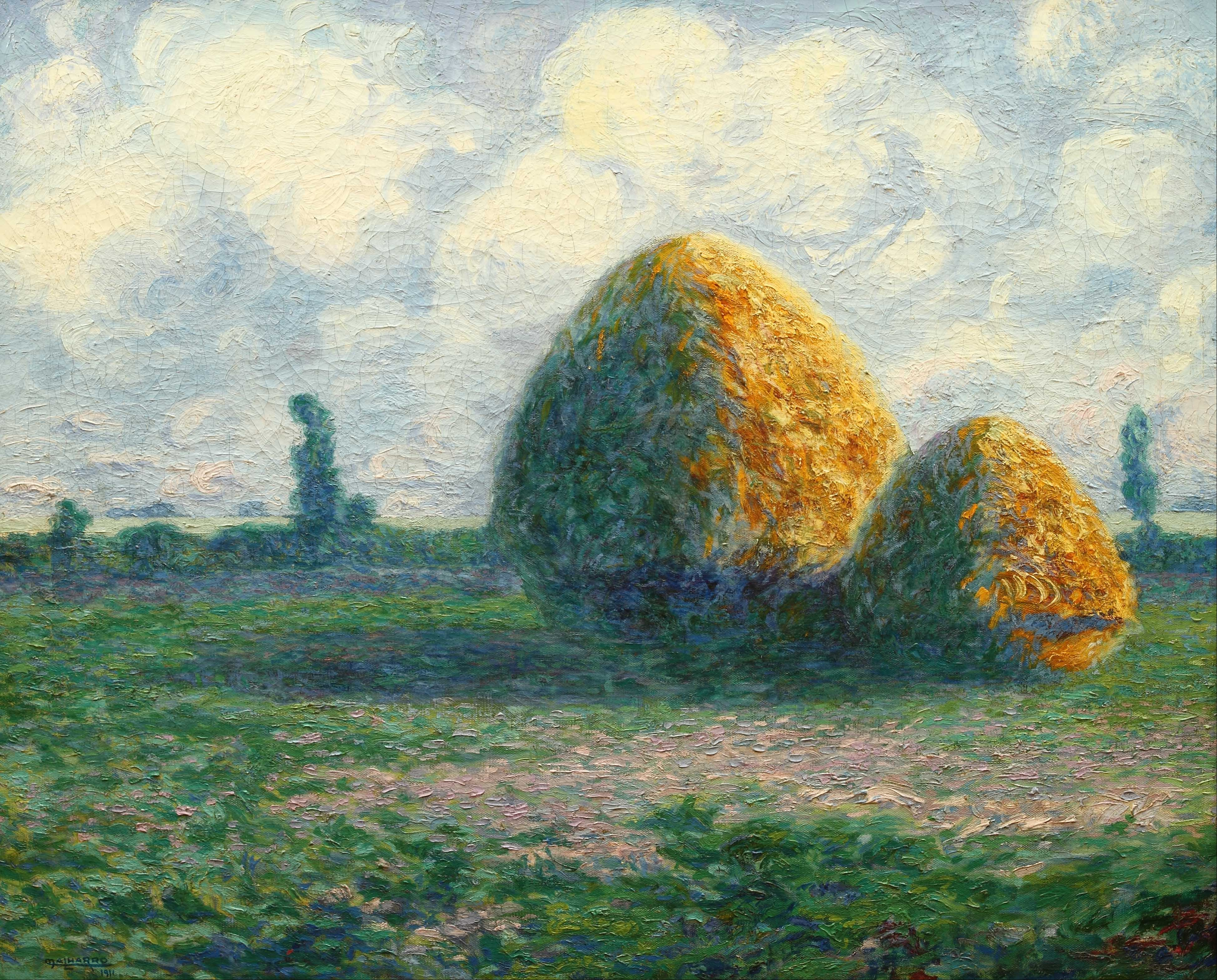
The haystacks (1911) by Martín Malharro. He is considered the introducer of Impressionism in Argentina.

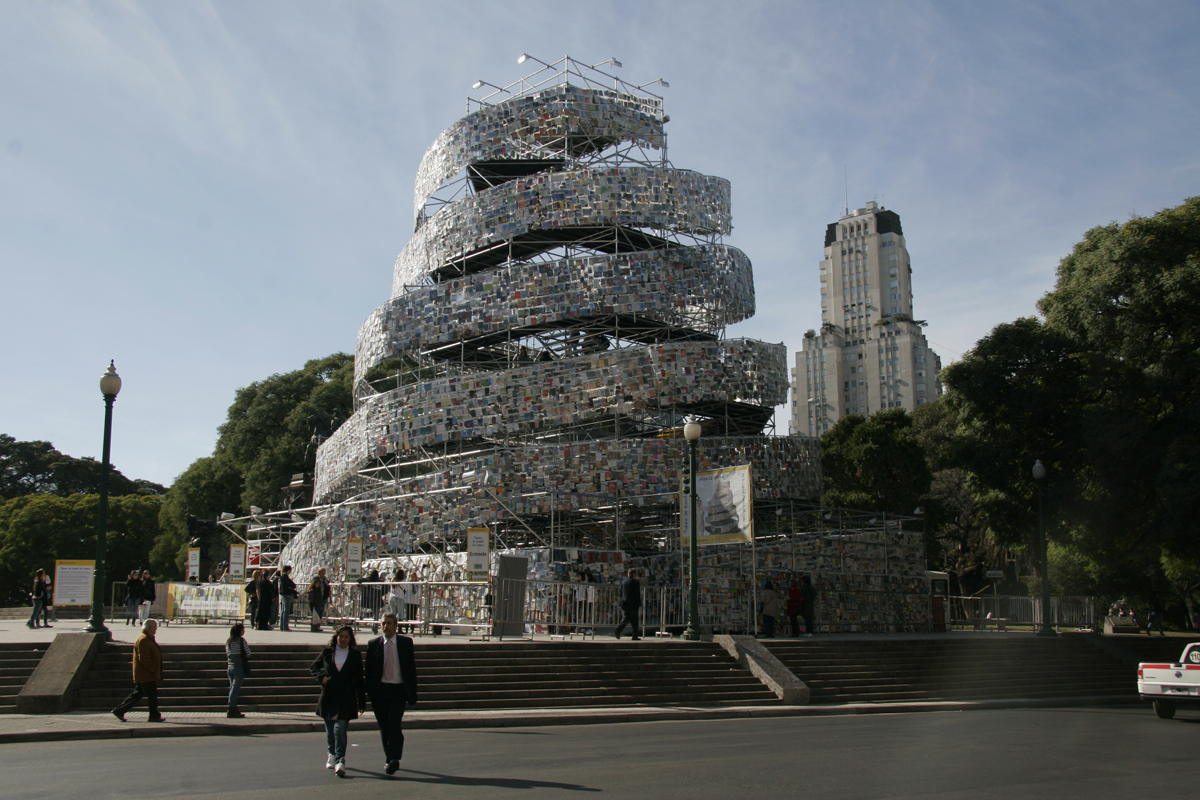
Marta Minujín's Tower of Babel (2011)

Argentine painters and sculptors have a rich history, dating from both before and since the development of modern Argentina in the second half of the 19th century. Artistic production did not truly come into its own, until after the 1852 overthrow of the repressive regime of Juan Manuel de Rosas. Immigrants like Eduardo Schiaffino, Eduardo Sívori, Reinaldo Giudici, Emilio Caraffa, and Ernesto de la Cárcova left behind a realist heritage influential to this day.

Impressionism did not make itself evident among Argentine artists until after 1900, however, and never acquired the kind of following it did in Europe, though it did inspire influential Argentine Post-Impressionists such as Martín Malharro, Ramón Silva, Cleto Ciocchini, Fernando Fader, Pío Collivadino, Cesáreo Bernaldo de Quirós, Realism, and aestheticism continued to set the agenda in Argentine painting and sculpture, noteworthy during this era for the sudden fame of sculptor Lola Mora, a student of Auguste Rodin.

Following the decline in Lola Mora's popularity among local high society, monumental sculpture became increasingly sought after, after 1900. Municipal governments and wealthy families were among its main patrons, often competing to commission elaborate mausolea for their deceased relatives. Although many preferred French and Italian sculptors, Argentine artists such as Erminio Blotta, Ángel María de Rosa and Rogelio Yrurtia also produced numerous monuments and memorials.

Yrurtia's work was less realist than that of some of his predecessors from the Belle Époque, drawing instead on a more subtle form of impressionism. His approach influenced Argentine sculptors such as Antonio Pujía, whose female torso sculptures incorporated surreal and whimsical elements. Meanwhile, Pablo Curatella Manes developed a sculptural style influenced by Cubism.

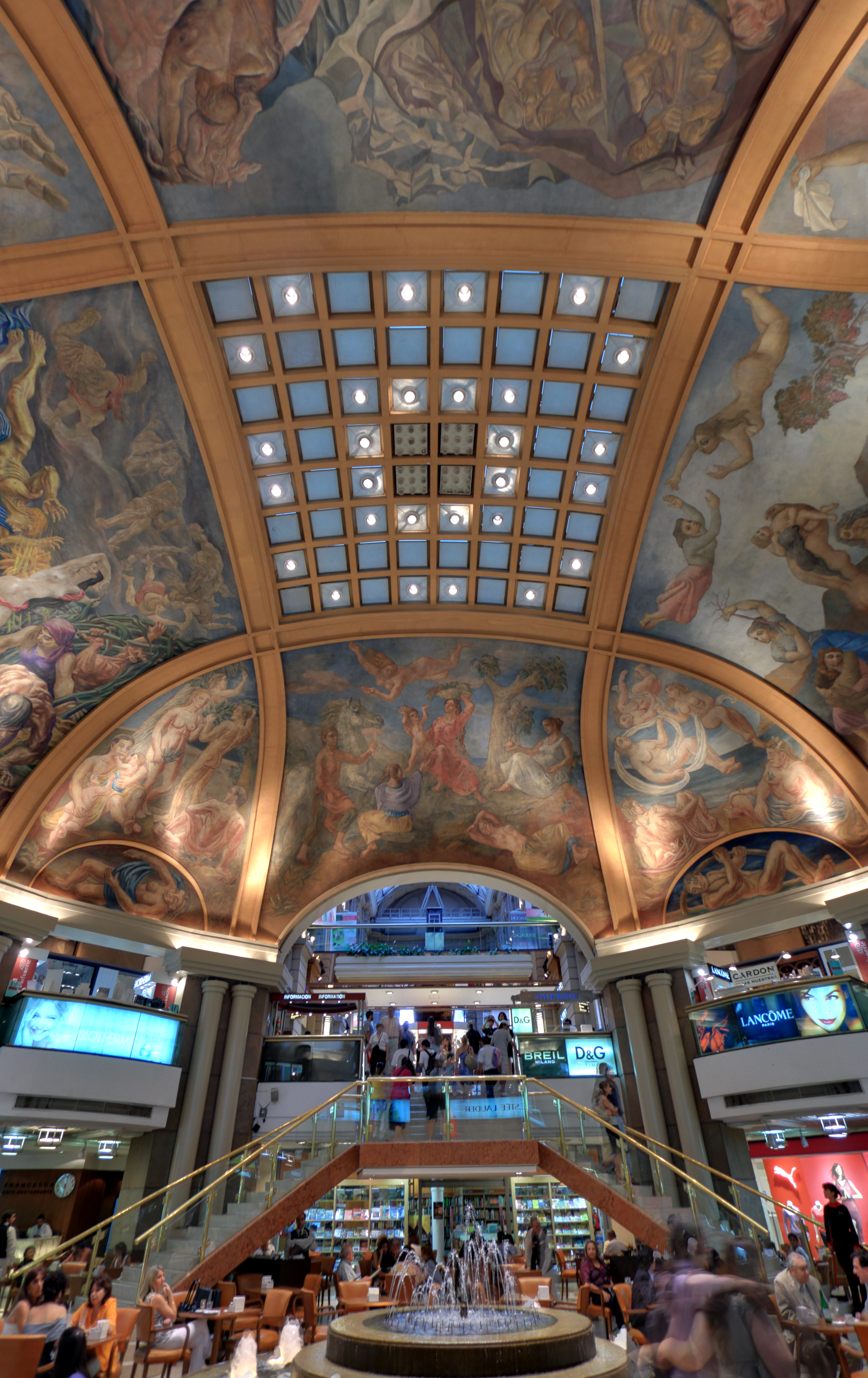
The frescoed dome of Galerías Pacífico was painted by muralists Berni, Castagnino, Colmeiro, Spilimbergo and Urruchúa.

Becoming an intellectual, as well as artistic circle, painters like Antonio Berni, Lino Enea Spilimbergo, and Juan Carlos Castagnino were friends as well as colleagues, going on to collaborate on masterpieces like the ceiling at the Galerias Pacifico arcade in Buenos Aires, towards 1933.

As in Mexico and elsewhere, muralism became increasingly popular among Argentine artists. Among the first to use his drab surroundings as a canvas was Benito Quinquela Martín, whose vaguely cubist pastel-colored walls painted in his Buenos Aires neighborhood of La Boca during the 1920s and 1930s, have become historical monuments and Argentine cultural emblems, worldwide. Lithographs, likewise, found a following in Argentina sometime after they had been made popular elsewhere. In Argentina, artists like Adolfo Bellocq, used this medium to portray often harsh working conditions in Argentina's growing industrial sector, during the 1920s and 1930s. Antonio Seguí, another lithographer, transferred his naïve style into murals in numerous nations, as did Ricardo Carpani, though in a realist style.

The vanguard in culturally conservative Argentina, futurists and cubists like Xul Solar and Emilio Pettoruti earned a following as considerable as that of less abstract and more sentimental portrait and landscape painters, like Raúl Soldi. Likewise, traditional abstract artists such as Romulo Macció, Anselmo Piccoli, Eduardo Mac Entyre, Luis Felipe Noé, and Luis Seoane co-existed with equal appeal as the most conceptual mobile art creators such as the unpredictable Pérez Celis, Gyula Kosice of the Argentine Madí Movement, and Marta Minujín, one of Andy Warhol's most esteemed fellow Conceptual artists.

The emergence of avant-garde genres in Argentine sculpture also featured Pablo Curatella Manes and Roberto Aizenberg, and constructivists such as Nicolás García Uriburu and Leon Ferrari, one of the world's foremost artists in his genre, today. In the 1960s and 1970s, many of these figures' abstract art found their way into popular advertising and even corporate logos.

Generally possessing a strong sentimental streak, the Argentine public's taste for naïve art and simple pottery cannot be overlooked. Since Prilidiano Pueyrredón's day, artists in the naïve vein like Cándido López have captured the absurdity of war; Susana Aguirre, and Aniko Szabó, the idiosyncrasies of everyday neighborhoods; Guillermo Roux's watercolors, a circus atmosphere; and Gato Frías, childhood memories. Illustrator Florencio Molina Campos's tongue-in-cheek depictions of gaucho life have endured as collector's items.

To help showcase Argentine and Latin American art and sculpture, local developer and art collector Eduardo Constantini set aside a significant portion of his personal collection, and in 1998, began construction on Buenos Aires' first major institution specializing in works by Latin American artists. His foundation opened the Buenos Aires Museum of Latin American Art (MALBA) in 2001.

=== Graphic arts ===
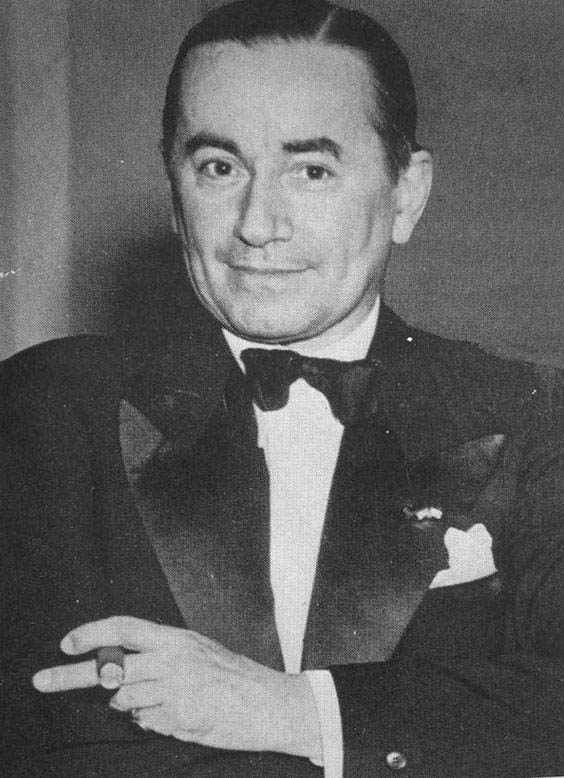
Florencio Molina Campos, Argentine illustrator and painter.

In the 1920s, Buenos Aires was overflowing with creative drawings and design. Argentine illustrators and sketchers were attracting worldwide recognition, including artists such as Jose Freire Segundo, creator of gráfica of Aikal (1940); Jose Luis Salinas, called upon by King Features to create a comic strip of worldwide fame, Cisco Kid; and Florencio Molina Campos, the brilliant sketcher of the Alpargatas Almanacs of rural life (1930), who collaborated on three Walt Disney films.

The culmination was the arrival, in 1927, of French painter, poster artist and sculptor Lucien Achille Mauzan, who was part of the artistic Art Deco movement. He settled in Buenos Aires and founded his own company Editorial Affiches Mauzan (Editorial Mauzan Posters) and created between 130 and 150 posters in the six years he spent in Argentina. He marks deeply in the poster art in Argentina, where his reputation is enormous. One of his well-known works is the amicably tortured head of Geniol.

In the 1950s Uruguayan-Argentine journalist, caricaturist Hermenegildo Sábat, portrayed political figures, as well as artists and other personalities. Many of his "Argentine cultural icons" are reproduced in ceramic tile in the Buenos Aires Underground.

=== Comics ===
Argentine comics were living its "Golden Age" between the 1940s and the 1960s. Cartoonists and comic creators have contributed prominently to national culture, including Alberto Breccia, Dante Quinterno, Oski, Francisco Solano López, Horacio Altuna, Guillermo Mordillo, Roberto Fontanarrosa, whose grotesque characters captured life's absurdities with quick-witted commentary, and Quino, known for the soup-hating Mafalda, and her comic strip gang of childhood friends, the theorist Oscar Masotta synthesized its contributions in the development of their own models of action comics (Héctor Oesterheld, Hugo Pratt), humor comics (Divito, Quino) and folkloric comics (Walter Ciocca) and the presence of four great artists (José Luis Salinas, Arturo Pérez del Castillo, Hugo Pratt and Alberto Breccia).

=== Architecture ===
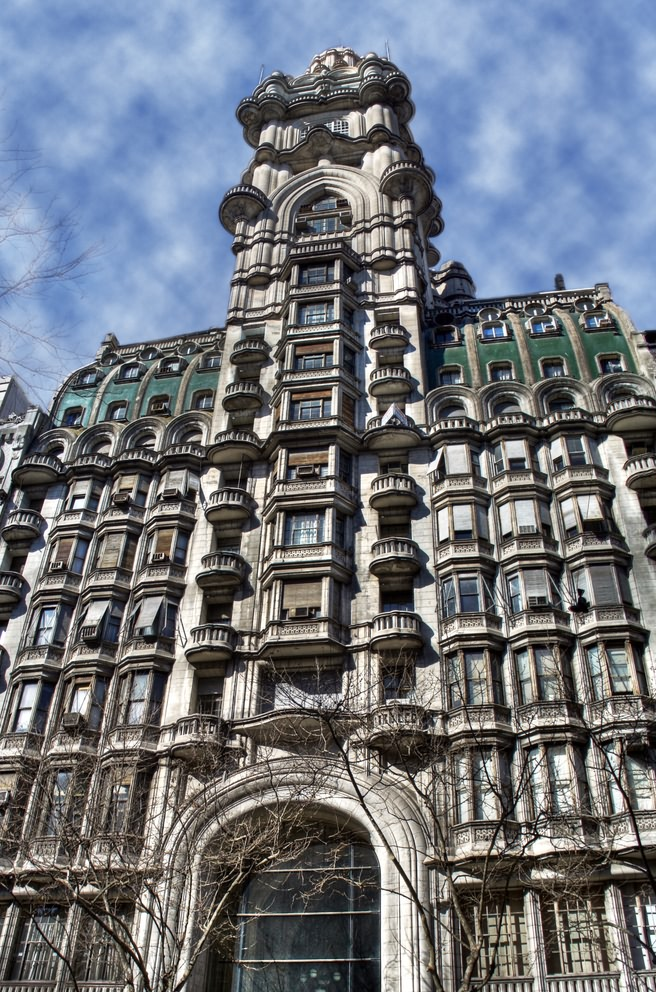
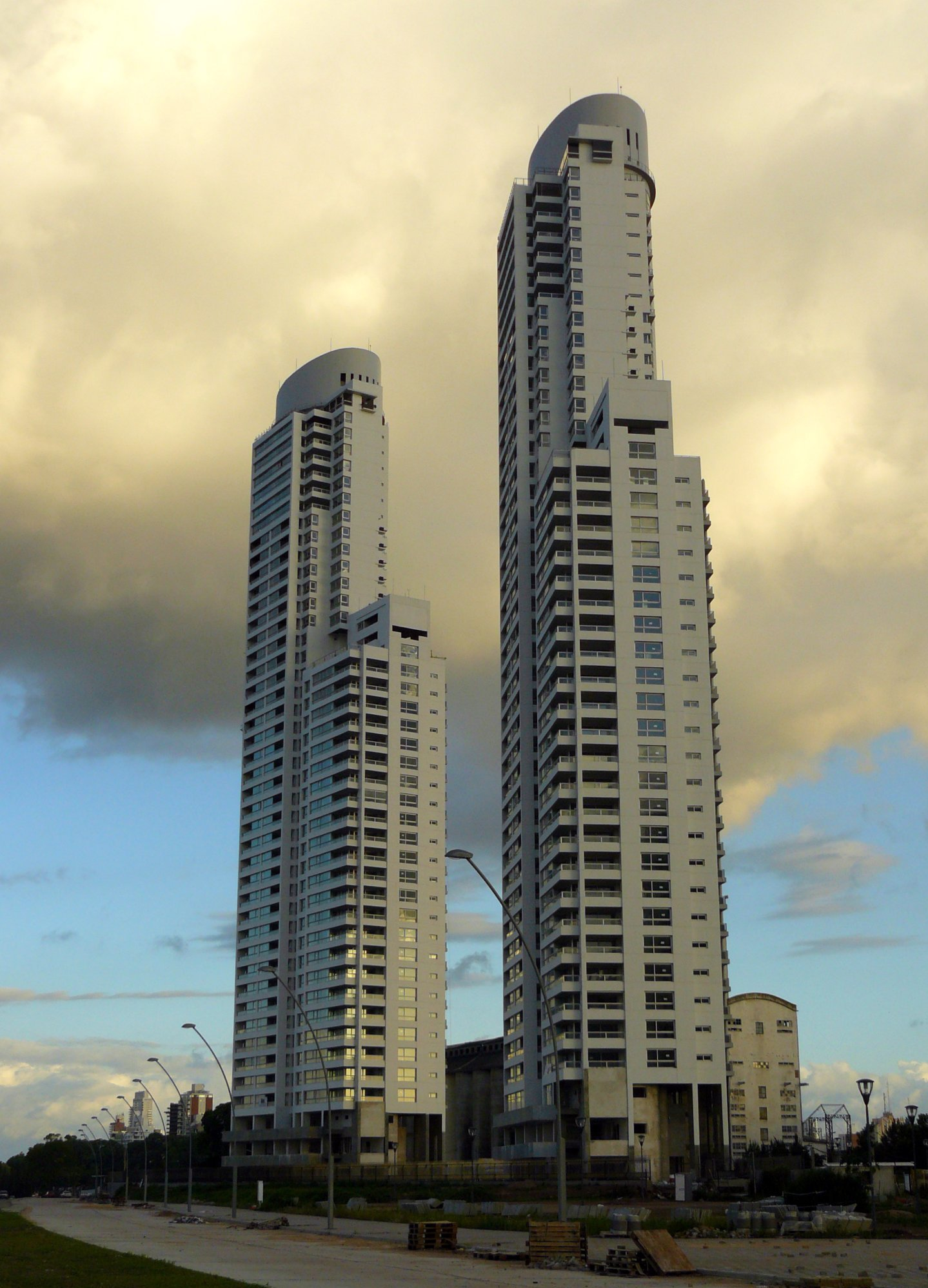
The Barolo tower, arguably Argentina's best-known Art Nouveau building. Dolfines Guaraní skyscrapers in Rosario, the country's tallest outside Buenos Aires.

The architecture of Argentina can be said to start at the beginning of the Spanish colonization, though it was in the 18th century that the cities of the country reached their splendour. Cities like Córdoba, Salta, Mendoza, and also Buenos Aires conserved most their historical Spanish colonial architecture in spite of their urban growth.

The simplicity of the Rioplatense baroque style can be clearly appreciated in Buenos Aires, in the works of Italian architects such as André Blanqui and Antonio Masella, in the churches of San Ignacio, Nuestra Señora del Pilar, the Cathedral, and the Cabildo.

Italian and French influences increased after the war for independence at the beginning of the 19th century, though the academic style persisted until the first decades of the 20th century. Attempts at renovation took place during the second half of the 19th century and beginning of the 20th, when the European tendencies penetrated into the country, reflected in numerous important buildings of Buenos Aires, such as the Santa Felicitam Church, by Ernesto Bunge; the Central Post Office and Palace of Justice, by Norbert Maillart; and the National Congress and the Colón Opera House, by Vittorio Meano.

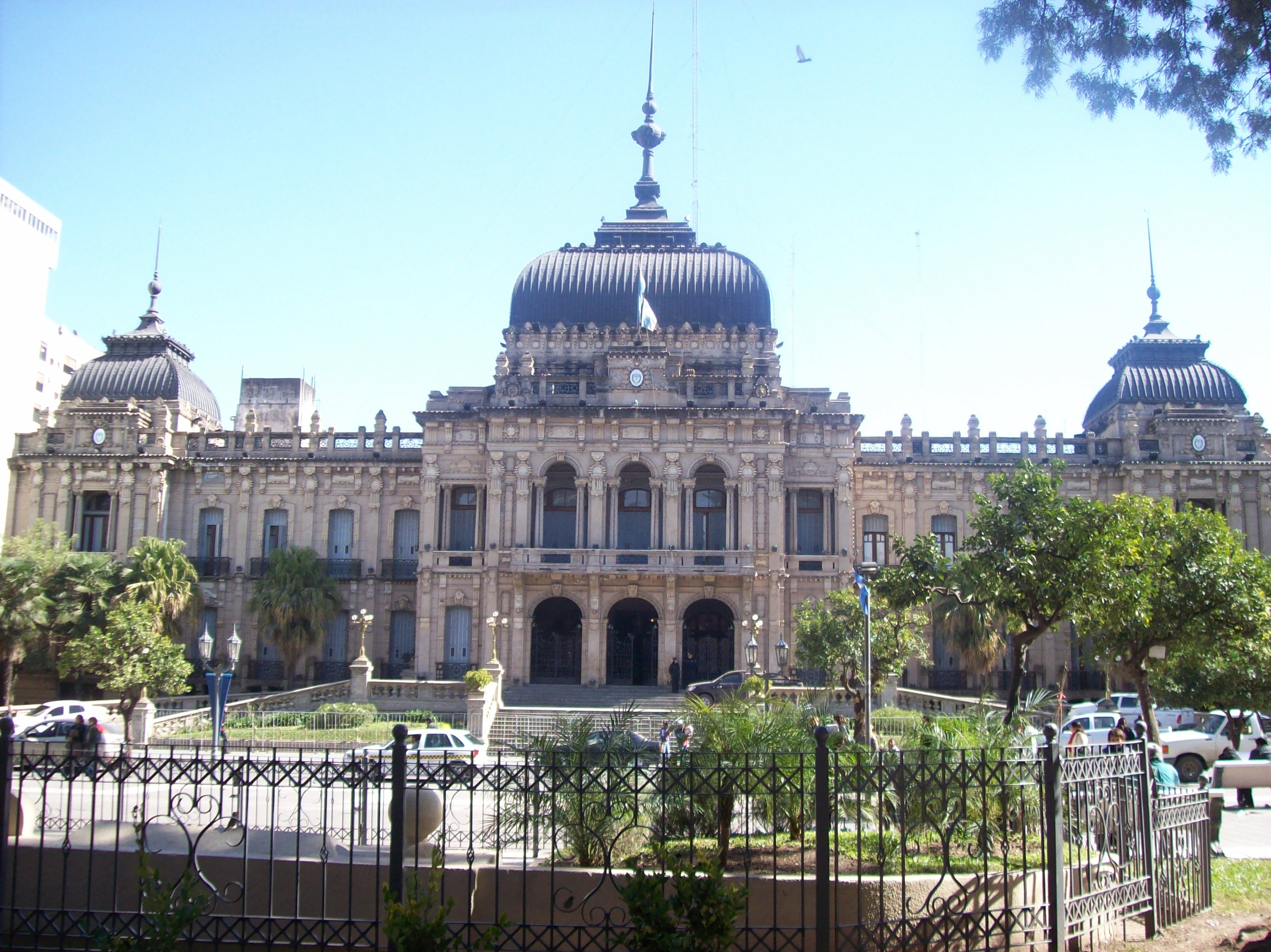
The Tucumán Government Palace is the executive office building of the Government of the Tucumán Province.

The architecture of the second half of the 20th century continued adapting French neoclassical architecture, such as the headquarters of the National Bank of Argentina, and the NH Gran Hotel Provincial, built by Alejandro Bustillo, and the Museo de Arte Hispano Fernández Blanco, by Martín Noel.

Numerous Argentine architects have enriched their own country's cityscapes, and in recent decades, those around the world. Juan Antonio Buschiazzo helped popularize Beaux-Arts architecture, and Francisco Gianotti combined Art Nouveau with Italianate styles, each adding flair to Argentine cities during the early 20th century. Francisco Salamone and Viktor Sulĉiĉ left an Art Deco legacy, and Alejandro Bustillo created a prolific body of Rationalist architecture. Clorindo Testa introduced Brutalist architecture locally, César Pelli's and Patricio Pouchulu's Futurist creations have graced cities, worldwide. Pelli's 1980s throwbacks to the Art Deco glory of the 1920s, in particular, made him one of the world's most prestigious architects.

Argentina cities have varied architecture. Commonly each house has an individual design, and is very rare to find any tract housing neighborhood.

Another example of Argentine architecture is the Curutchet House, located in La Plata, was designed by the Swiss-French architect Charles-Édouard Jeanneret. In 2016 it was declared a World Heritage Site by UNESCO.

== Popular culture ==
=== Cinema ===
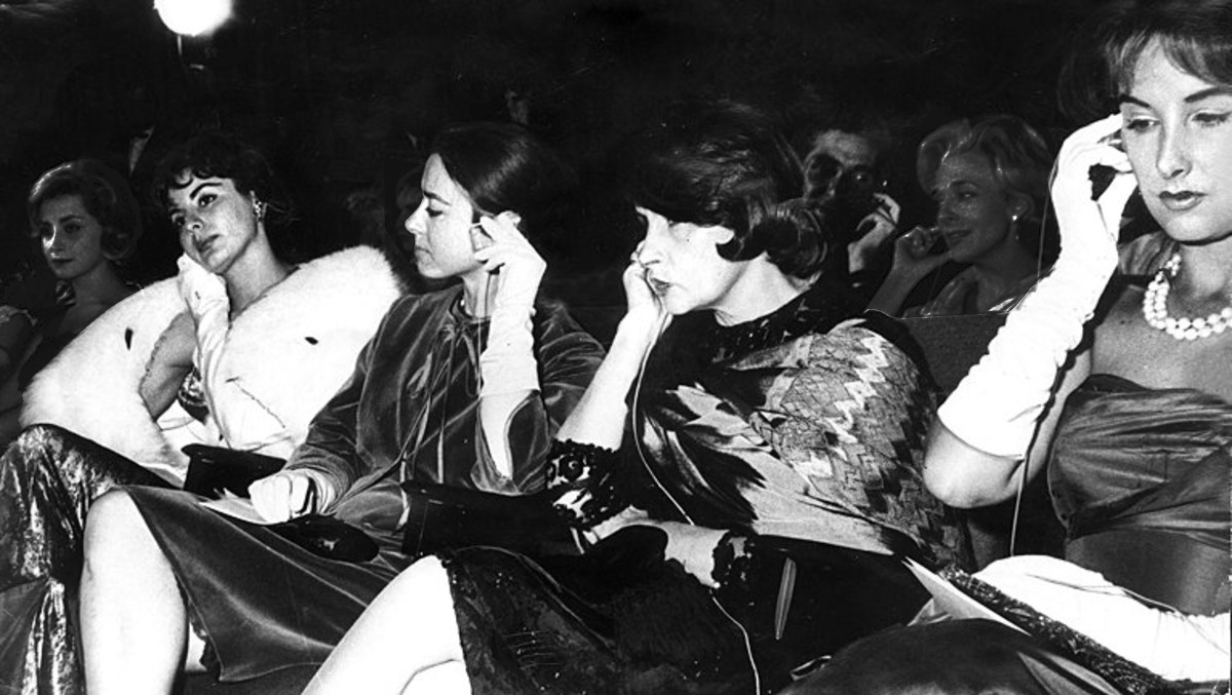
Iconic Argentine actresses in the 1961 Berlin International Film Festival: Isabel Sarli, Olga Zubarry, Tita Merello and Mirtha Legrand

The Argentine film industry created around 170 full-length titles in 2012. The world's first animated feature films were made and released in Argentina, by cartoonist Quirino Cristiani, in 1917 and 1918. Argentine cinema enjoyed a 'golden age' in the 1930s through the 1950s with scores of productions, many now considered classics of Spanish-language film. The industry produced actors who became the first movie stars of Argentine cinema, often tango performers such as Libertad Lamarque, Floren Delbene, Tito Lusiardo, Tita Merello, Roberto Escalada, and Hugo del Carril.

More recent films from the "New Wave" of cinema since the 1980s have achieved worldwide recognition, such as The Official Story (Best foreign film Oscar in 1986), Man Facing Southeast, A Place in the World, Nine Queens, Son of the Bride, The Motorcycle Diaries, Blessed by Fire, The Secret in Their Eyes, winner of the 2009 Academy Award for Best Foreign Language Film, and Wild Tales. Although rarely rivaling Hollywood productions in popularity, local films are released weekly, and widely followed in Argentina and internationally. A number of local films, many of which are low-budget productions, have earned prizes in cinema festivals (such as Cannes), and are promoted by events such as the Mar del Plata Film Festival and the Buenos Aires International Festival of Independent Cinema.

The per capita number of screens is one of the highest in Latin America, and viewing per capita is the highest in the region. A new generation of Argentine directors have caught the attention of critics worldwide. Cinema is an important facet of local culture, as well as a popular pastime, and levels of cinema attendance are comparable to those of European countries. Argentine composers Luis Bacalov, Gustavo Santaolalla, and Eugenio Zanetti have been honored with Academy Award for Best Original Score nods. Lalo Schifrin has received numerous Grammys, and is best known for the Mission:Impossible theme.

=== Music ===
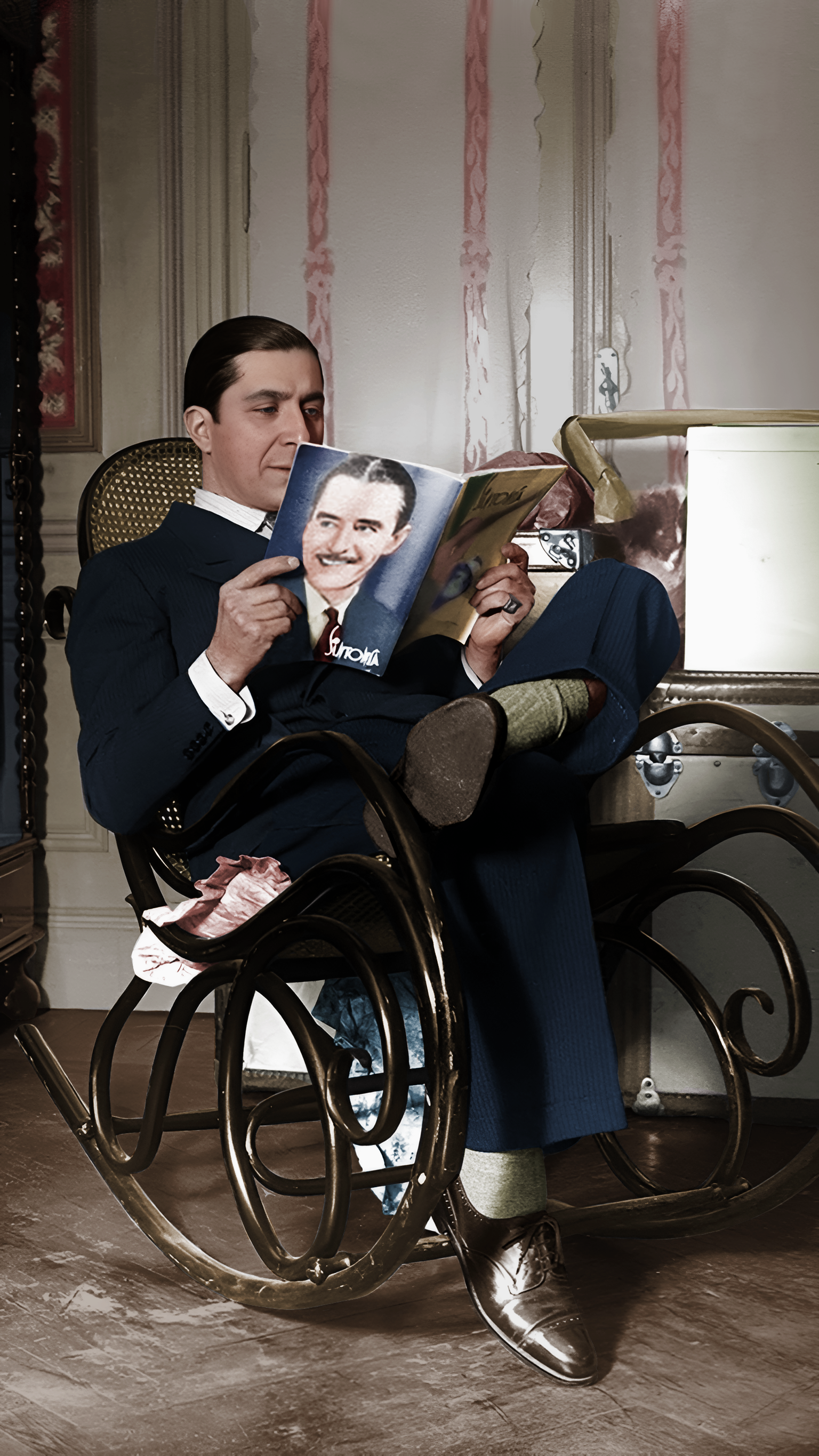
Carlos Gardel is the most famous representative of Tango.

Tango, the music and lyrics (often sung in a form of slang called lunfardo), is Argentina's musical symbol. The Milonga dance was a predecessor, slowly evolving into modern tango. By the 1930s, tango had changed from a dance-focused music to one of lyric and poetry, with singers such as Carlos Gardel, Hugo del Carril, Roberto Goyeneche, Raúl Lavié, Tita Merello, and Edmundo Rivero. The golden age of tango (1930 to mid-1950s) mirrored that of jazz and swing in the United States, featuring large orchestral groups too, like the bands of Osvaldo Pugliese, Aníbal Troilo, Francisco Canaro, Julio de Caro, and Juan d'Arienzo. Incorporating acoustic music and later, synthesizers into the genre after 1955, bandoneón virtuoso Astor Piazzolla popularized "new tango" creating a more subtle, intellectual and listener-oriented trend. Today, tango enjoys worldwide popularity; ever-evolving, neo-tango is a global phenomenon with groups like Tanghetto, Bajofondo, and the Gotan Project.

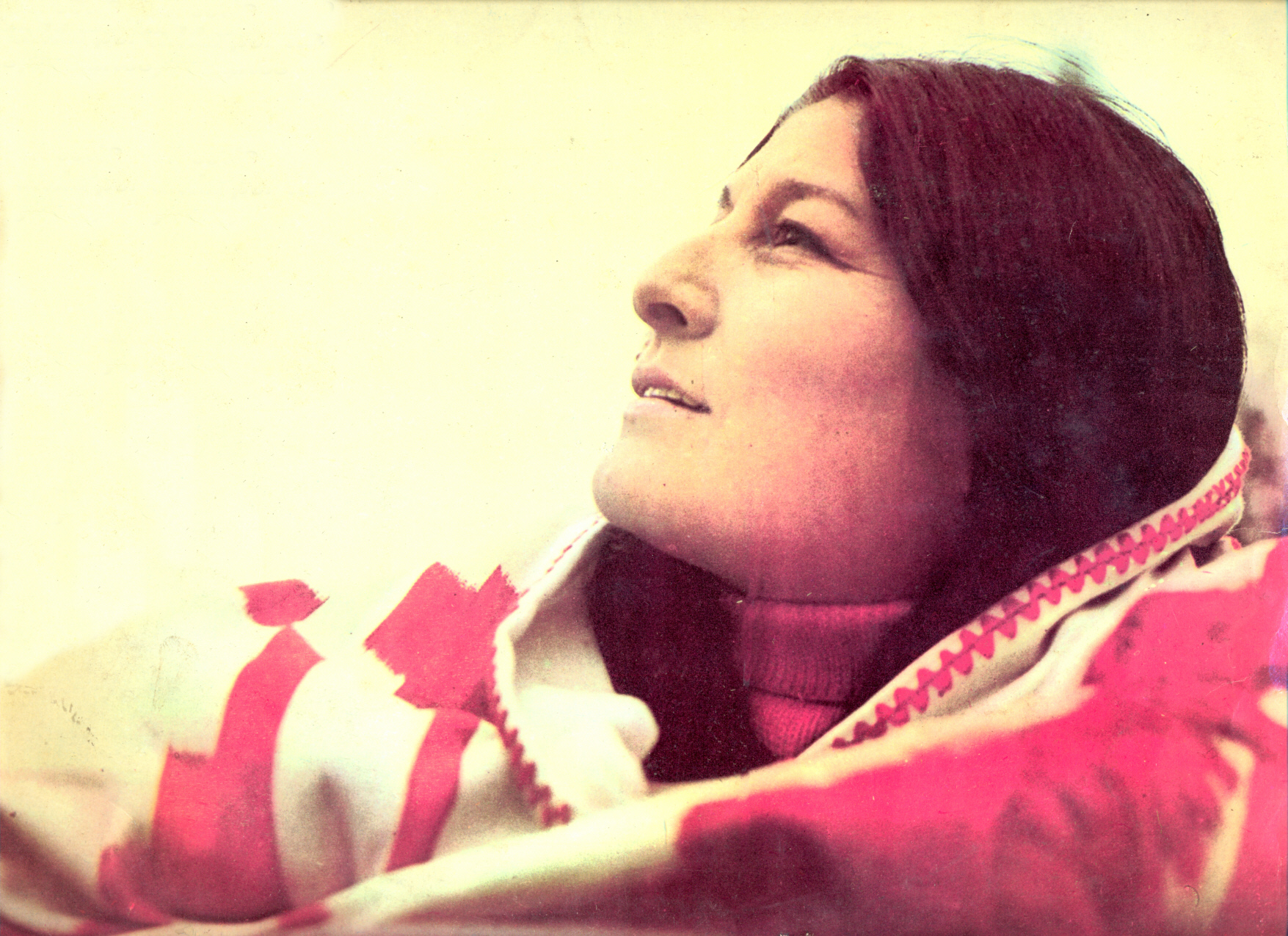
Known as the "voice of the voiceless ones", Mercedes Sosa was one of the preeminent exponents of nueva canción.

Argentine rock, called rock nacional, is the most popular music among the youth. Arguably the most listened-to form of Spanish-language rock, its influence and international success are owed to a rich, uninterrupted development. Bands such as Soda Stereo or Sumo, and composers like Charly García, Luis Alberto Spinetta, Fito Páez and Andrés Calamaro are referents of national culture. Mid-1960s Buenos Aires and Rosario were cradles of the music, and by 1970, Argentine rock was well established among middle class youth (see: Almendra, Sui Generis, Pappo, Crucis, Pescado Rabioso). Serú Girán bridged the gap into the 1980s, when Argentine bands became popular across Latin America and elsewhere (Enanitos Verdes, Fabulosos Cadillacs and Virus). There are many subgenres: underground, pop-oriented, and some associated with the working class (La Renga, Divididos, Hermética, V8 and Los Redonditos). Current popular bands include Babasónicos, Los Auténticos Decadentes, Rata Blanca, Horcas, Attaque 77, Bersuit, Los Piojos, Catupecu Machu, Carajo and Callejeros.

European classical music is well represented in Argentina. Buenos Aires is home to the Colón Theater. Classical musicians, such as Martha Argerich, Eduardo Alonso-Crespo, Daniel Barenboim, Eduardo Delgado, and Alberto Lysy, and classical composers such as Juan José Castro and Alberto Ginastera, and contemporary composers such as Osvaldo Golijov, Gerardo Gandini, and Oscar Edelstein are internationally acclaimed. All major cities in Argentina have impressive theaters or opera houses, and provincial or city orchestras. Some cities have annual events and important classical music festivals like Semana Musical Llao Llao in San Carlos de Bariloche, and the multitudinous Amadeus in Buenos Aires.

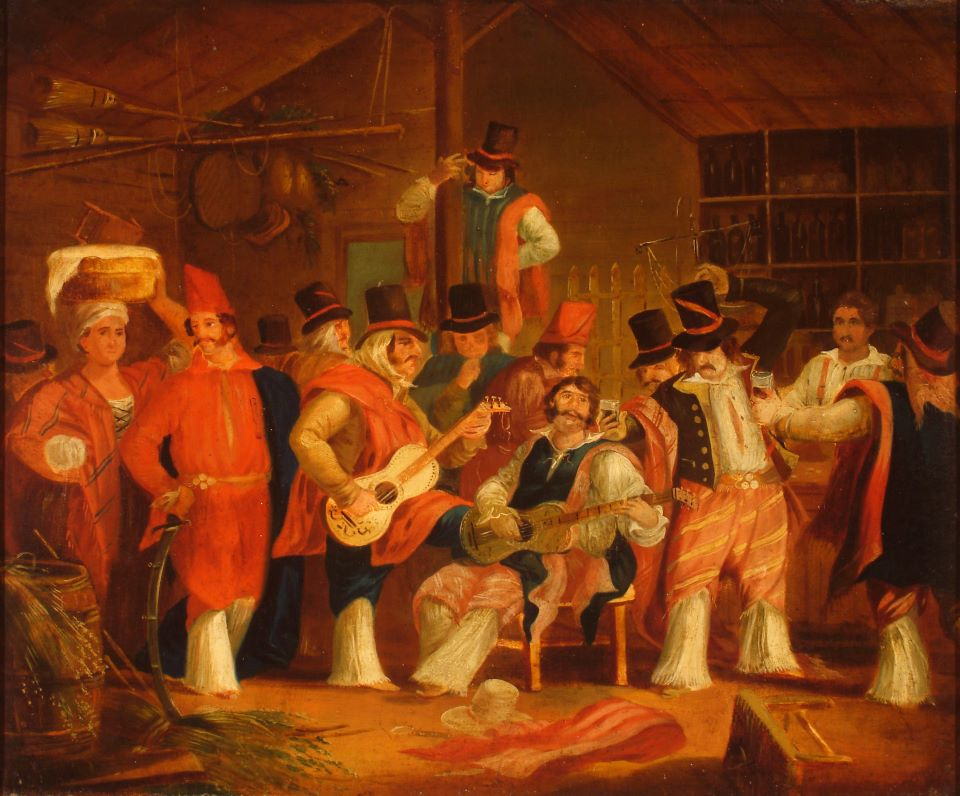
Payada in a bar. Painting by Carlos Morel.

Argentine folk music is uniquely vast. Beyond dozens of regional dances, a national folk style emerged in the 1930s. Perón's Argentina would give rise to Nueva Canción, as artists began expressing in their music objections to political themes. Atahualpa Yupanqui, folk musician, and Mercedes Sosa would be defining figures in shaping Nueva Canción, gaining worldwide popularity in the process. The style found a huge reception in Chile, where it took off in the 1970s, and went on to influence the entirety of Latin American music. Today, Chango Spasiuk and Soledad Pastorutti have brought folk back to younger generations. León Gieco's folk-rock bridged the gap between Argentine folklore and Argentine rock, introducing both styles to millions overseas in successive tours.

=== Theater ===
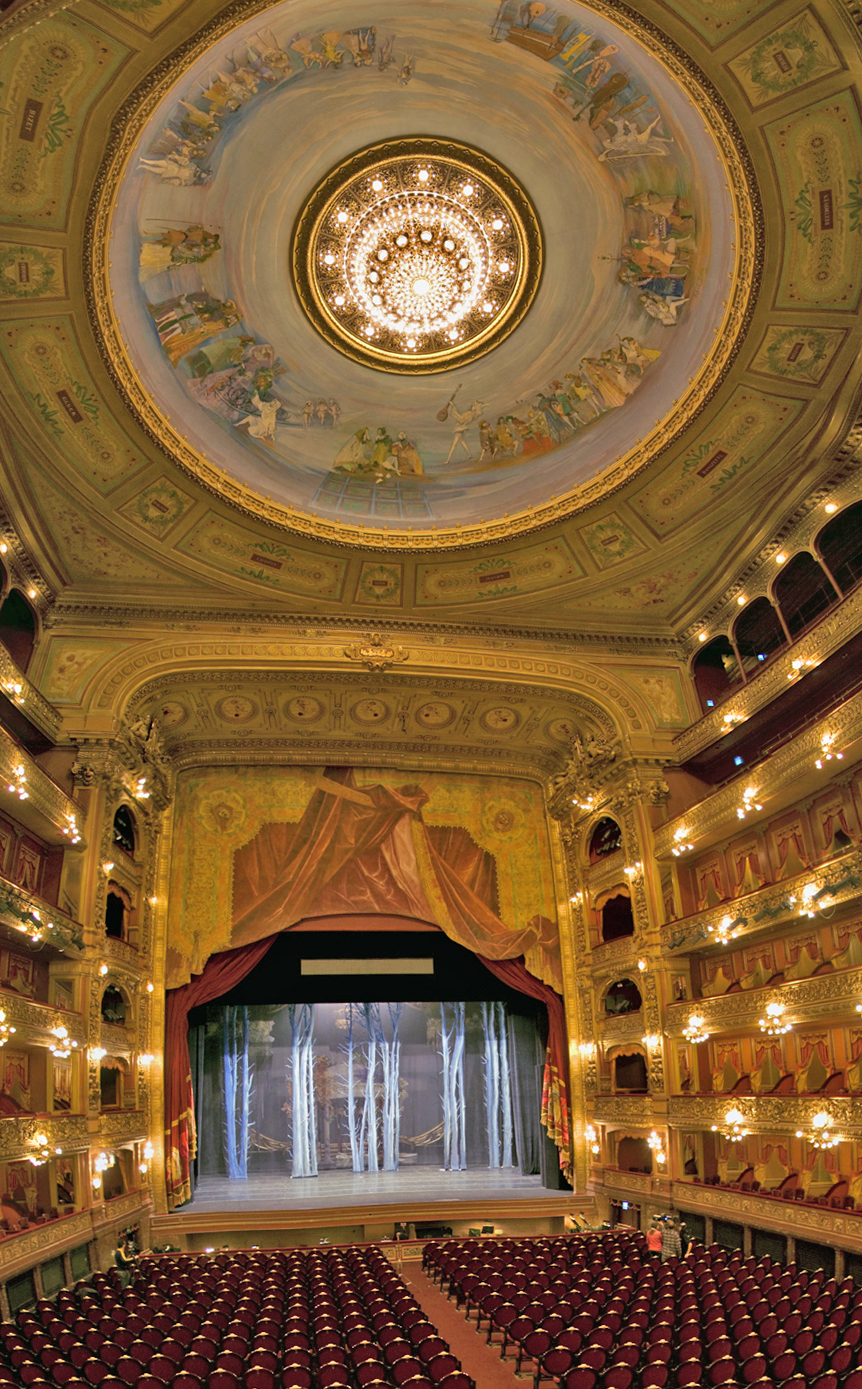
The interior of the Teatro Colón.

Buenos Aires is one of the world's great capitals of theater. The Teatro Colón is a national landmark for opera and classical performances; built at the end of the 19th century, its acoustics are considered the best in the world, and is currently undergoing a major refurbishment in order to preserve its outstanding sound characteristics, the French-romantic style, the impressive Golden Room (a minor auditorium targeted to Chamber Music performances), and the museum at the entrance. With its theater scene of national and international caliber, Corrientes Avenue is synonymous with the art. It is thought of as the street that never sleeps, and sometimes referred to as the Broadway of Buenos Aires. Many great careers in acting, music, and film have begun in its many theaters. The Teatro General San Martín is one of the most prestigious, along Corrientes Avenue, and the Teatro Nacional Cervantes functions as the national stage theater of Argentina. The Teatro Argentino de La Plata, El Círculo in Rosario, Independencia in Mendoza, and Libertador in Córdoba are also prominent. Griselda Gambaro, Copi, Roberto Cossa, Marco Denevi, Carlos Gorostiza, and Alberto Vaccarezza are a few of the more prominent Argentine playwrights. Julio Bocca, Jorge Donn, José Neglia, and Norma Fontenla are some of the great ballet dancers of the modern era.

== Cuisine ==
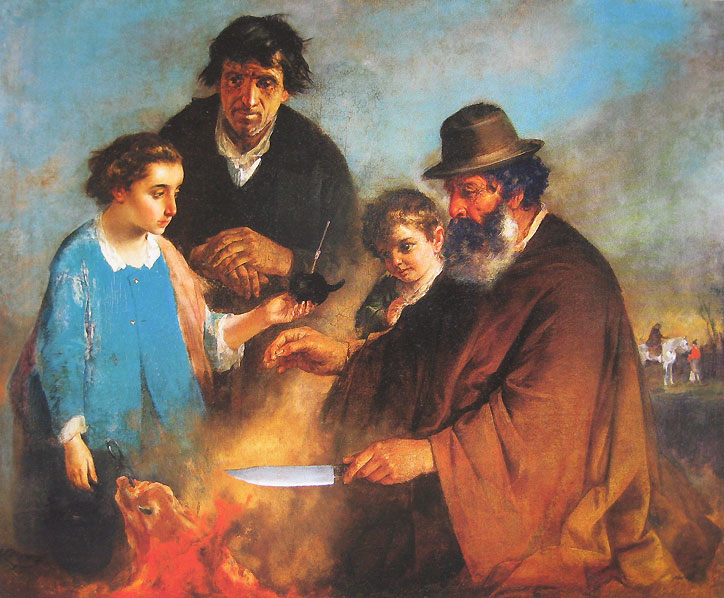
The asado (1888), by Ignacio Manzoni. Asado is considered a national dish, and is typical of Argentine families to gather on Sundays around one.

Besides many of the pasta, sausage, and dessert dishes common to continental Europe, Argentines enjoy a wide variety of Indigenous and Criollo creations, which include empanadas (a stuffed pastry), locro (a mixture of maize, beans, meat, bacon, onion, and gourd), humitas, and yerba mate, all originally indigenous Amerindian staples, the latter considered Argentina's national beverage. Other popular items include chorizo (a pork sausage), facturas (Viennese-style pastry), dulce de leche, a sort of milk caramel jam and the alfajor.

The Argentine barbecue asado, includes succulent types of meat, among them chorizo, sweetbread, chitterlings, and morcilla (blood sausage). Thin sandwiches, known as sandwiches de miga, are also popular. Argentines have the highest consumption of red meat in the world.

The Argentine wine industry, long among the largest outside Europe, has benefited from growing investment since 1992; in 2007, 60% of foreign investment worldwide in viticulture was destined to Argentina. The country is the fifth most important wine producer in the world, with the annual per capita consumption of wine among the highest. Malbec grape, a discardable varietal in France (country of origin), has found in the Province of Mendoza an ideal environment to successfully develop and turn itself into the world's best Malbec. Mendoza accounts for 70% of the country's total wine production. "Wine tourism" is important in Mendoza province, with the impressive landscape of the Cordillera de Los Andes, and the highest peak in the Americas, Aconcagua (6,952 m (22,808 ft) high) providing a very desirable destination for international tourism.

An event that changed the country's gastronomy was the Great European immigration wave to Argentina, millions of Italians, French, Germans, Spaniards, Poles, Irish, Russians, Welsh, Ukrainians and other groups arrived in the country. This caused gastronomy to change completely, the Fugazzeta, the Milanese, the Croissant, the Gnocchi, among other foods are now part of Argentine culture.

== Sports ==
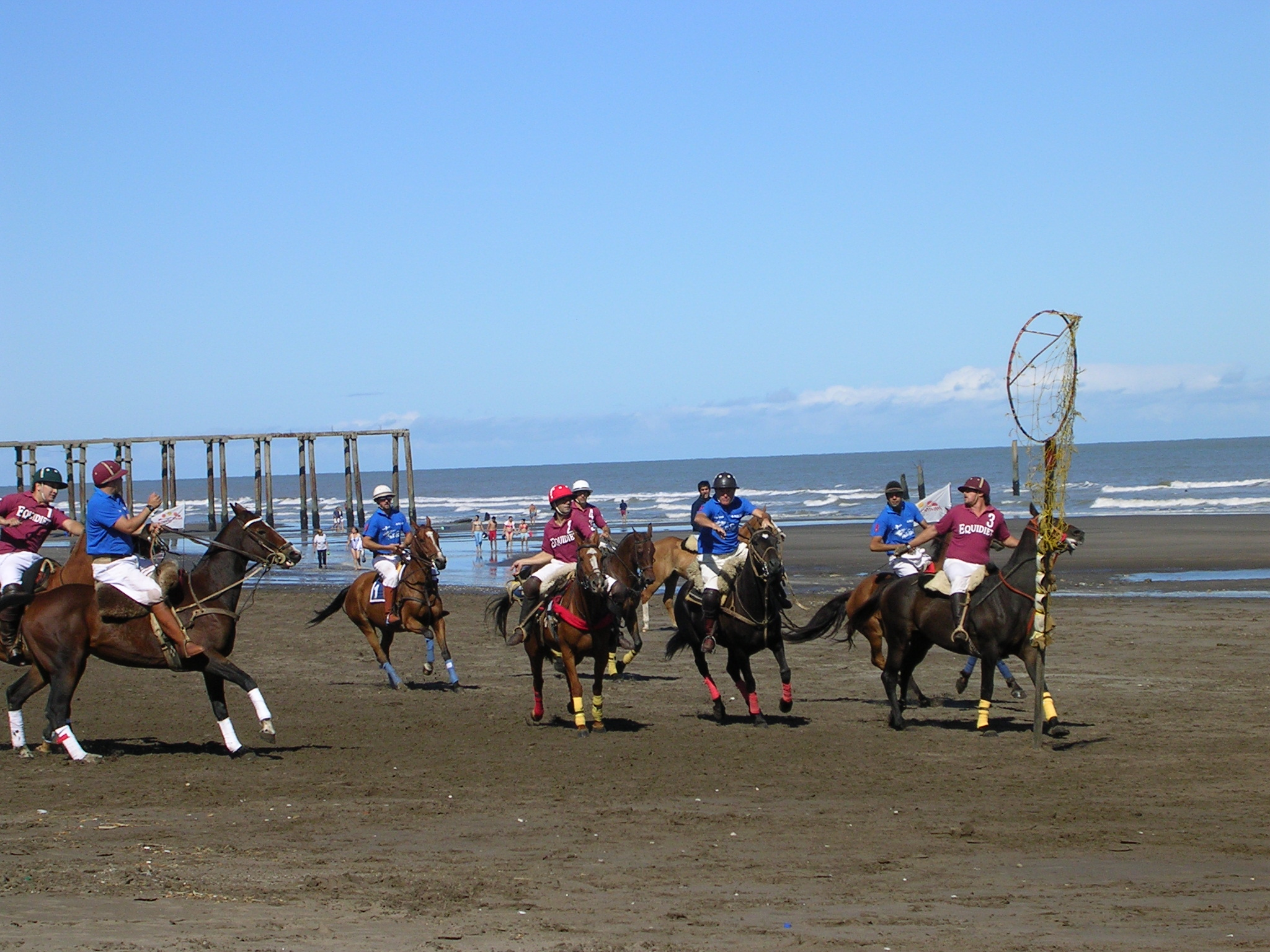
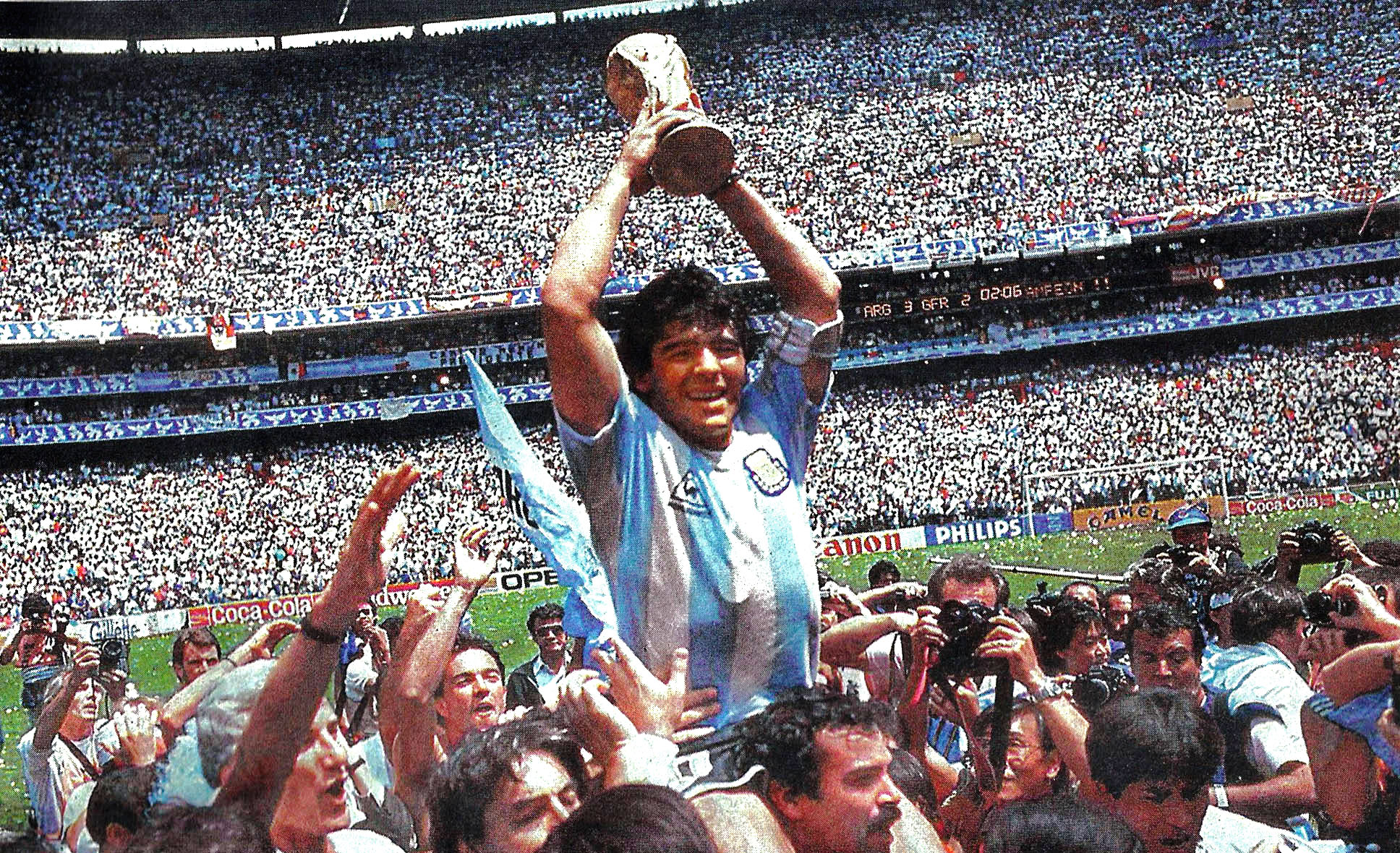
The national sport of Argentina is the pato but the most popular sport is the football.

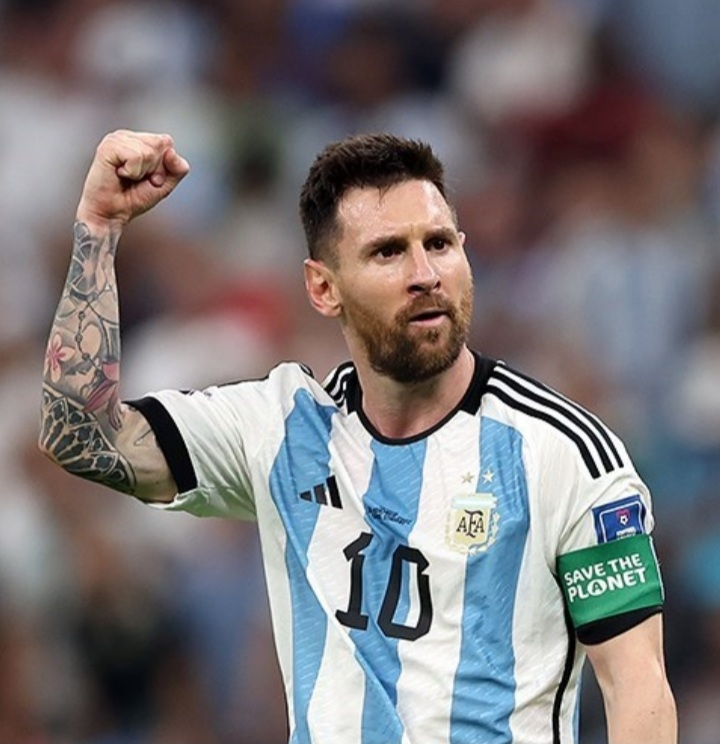
Lionel Messi is the football player

The official national sport of Argentina is pato, although it is not very popular. It is played with a six-handle ball on horseback.

Football is the most popular sport in Argentina. The national football team has won 26 major international titles, including three FIFA World Cups, two Olympic gold medals and 16 Copa Américas, the most in the competitions history with the most recent win being Copa América 2024 hosted by the United States. Over one thousand Argentine players play abroad, the majority of them in European football leagues. There are 331,811 registered football players, with increasing numbers of girls and women, who have organized their own national championships since 1991, and were South American champions in 2006.

The Argentine Football Association (AFA) was formed in 1893, and is the eighth oldest national football association in the world. The AFA today counts 3,377 football clubs, including 20 in the Premier Division. Since the AFA went professional in 1931, fifteen teams have won national tournament titles, including River Plate with 33 and Boca Juniors with 24. Over the last twenty years, futsal and beach football have become increasingly popular. The Argentine national beach football team was one of four competitors in the first international championship for the sport, in Miami in 1993.

Basketball is the second most popular sport; a number of basketball players play in the NBA and European leagues including Emanuel Ginóbili, Andrés Nocioni, Carlos Delfino, Luis Scola, Pablo Prigioni, Juan Ignacio Sánchez and Fabricio Oberto. The national basketball team won the gold medal at the 2004 Summer Olympics and the bronze medal in 2008. Argentina is currently ranked third by the International Basketball Federation.

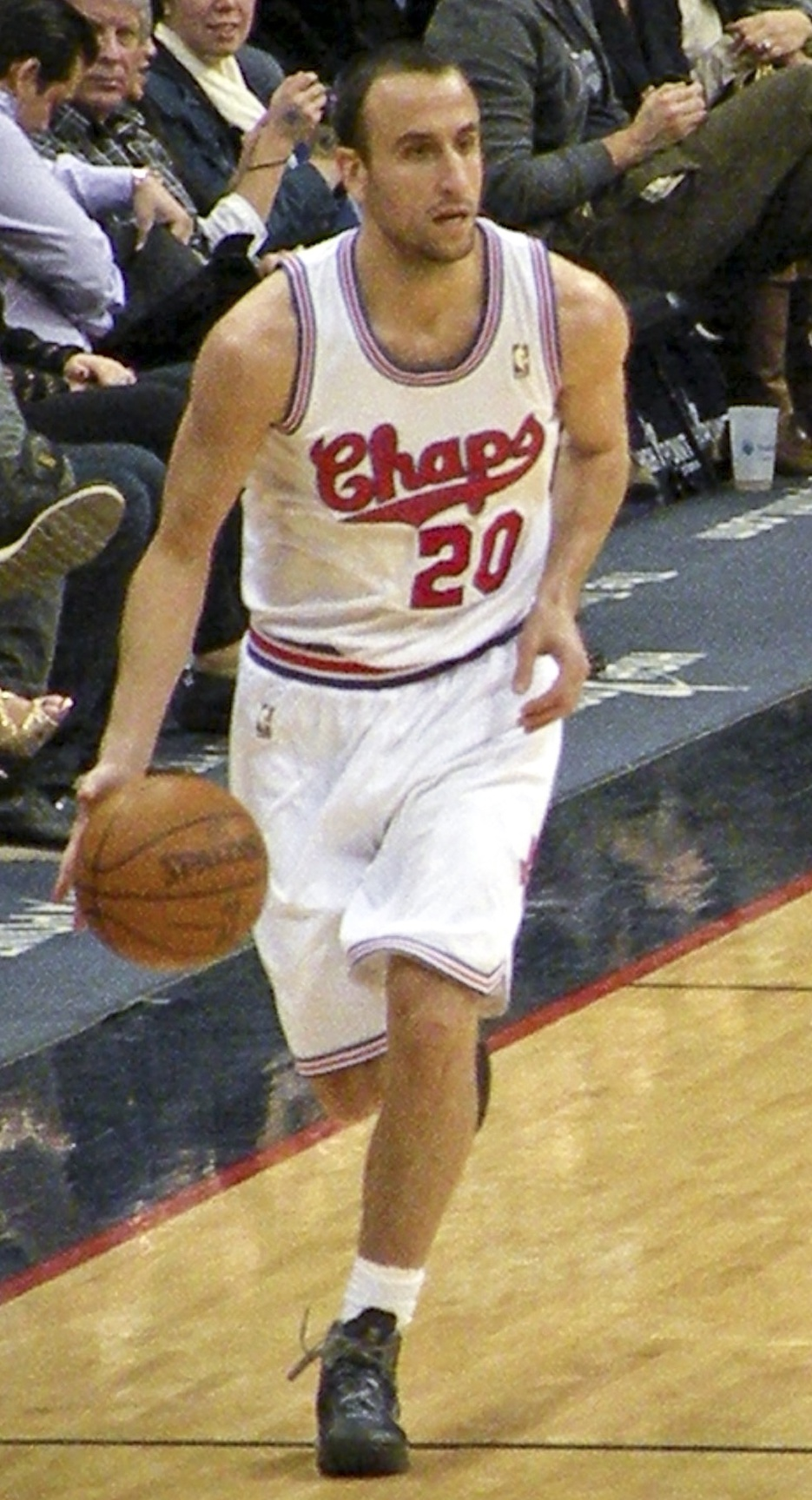
Emanuel Ginóbili, one of the most recognized Argentine basketball players.

Argentina has an important rugby union team, "Los Pumas", with many of its players playing in Europe. Argentina beat host nation France twice in the 2007 Rugby World Cup, placing them third in the competition, and also finished 4th in the 2015 edition of the World Cup. The Pumas are currently ranked fifth in the official world rankings.

Historically, Argentina has had a strong showing within Auto racing. Juan Manuel Fangio was five times Formula One world champion under four different teams, winning 102 of his 184 international races, and is widely ranked as the greatest driver of all time. Other distinguished racers were Oscar Alfredo Gálvez, Juan Gálvez, José Froilán González and Carlos Reutemann.

Field hockey with the national team Las Leonas is one of the world's most successful, with four Olympic medals, two World Cups, a World League and seven Champions Trophy. Luciana Aymar is recognized as the best female player in the history of this sport.

Argentina reigns undisputed in Polo, having won more international championships than any other country and been seldom beaten since the 1930s. The Argentine Polo Championship is the sport's most important international team trophy. The country is home to most of the world's top players, among them Adolfo Cambiaso, the best in Polo history.

Other popular sports include tennis, handball, boxing, volleyball and golf.

The Vamos vamos Argentina chant is a trademark of Argentine fans during sporting events.

== Values ==
Argentine values is a shared identity core that brings together actions and thoughts aimed at increasing social capital and fostering the common good among Argentines. As Rokeach state, "Values are the evaluative component of an individual's attitudes and beliefs. Values guide how we think about things in terms of what is right/wrong and correct/incorrect. Values trigger positive or negative emotions. Values also guide our actions "(Neuliep, 2009, p. 66). Argentine Values intends to create a community formed by all those who are convinced that Argentina is a great country. Argentina is a collective country where its values focus on diversity and solidarity.

In addition to being a collectivistic society. The Argentines are from traditional customs, but also kind and friendly. The greeting is a crucial element in the Argentine culture where we see that nobody leaves without being greeted; Men kiss women, Women kiss men, and other men kiss men on the cheek.

Another principal value for Argentines is the family. In Argentina, for example, it is prevalent for family members to visit traditionally on Sunday, meetings in which there are music, food, and games. But apart from these types of meetings, the family almost always meets for family events or gatherings such as births, weddings, and similar activities. For me that I had the experience of living three months in the country, it was very nice to see how generations come together, and "values are transmitted across generations" (Prioste, Narciso, Goncalves, & Pereira, 2017).

== See also ==
- Argentine tea culture
- Colon Theater Ballet
- Football in Argentina
- Tango (dance)
