= Ángel María de Rosa Municipal Museum of Art =

Coordinates: 34°35′26″S 60°56′46″W

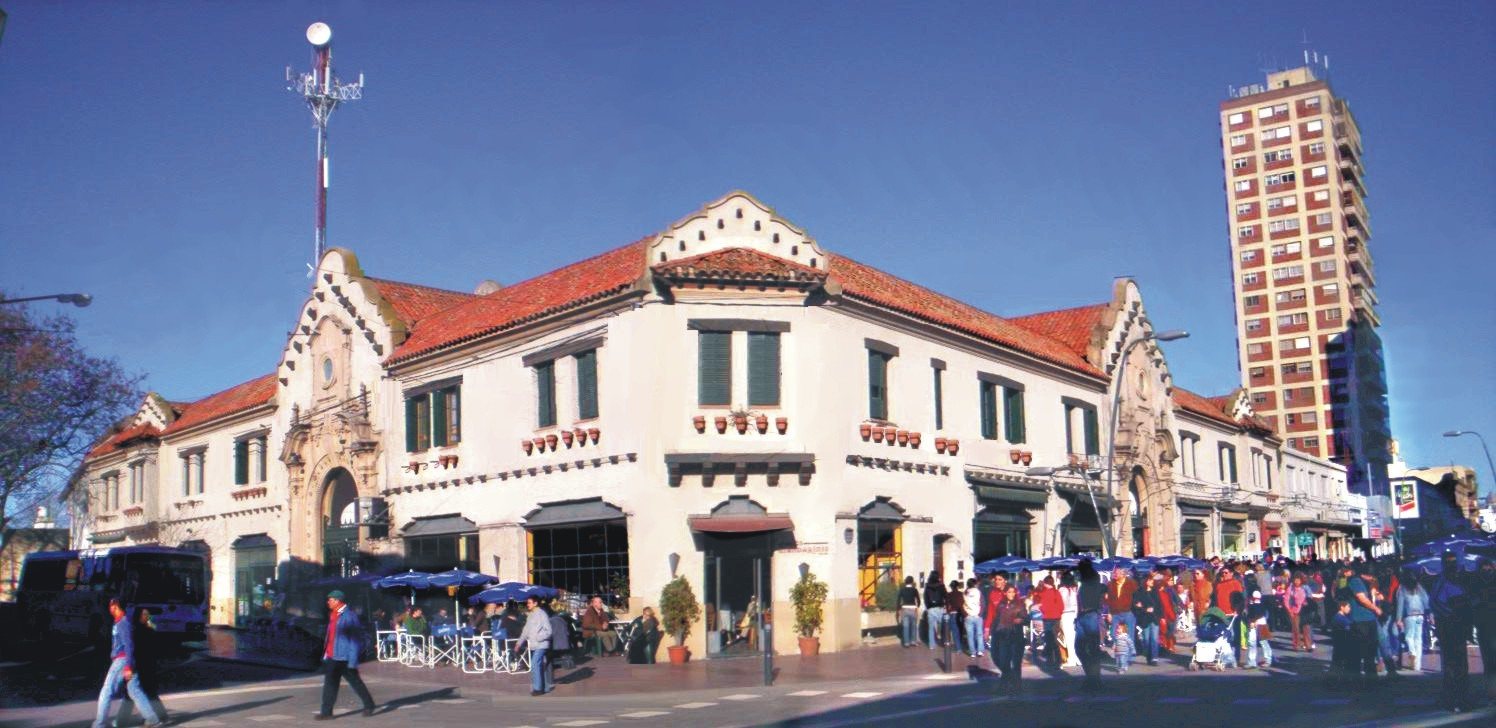
The Ángel María de Rosa Municipal Museum of Art

The Ángel María de Rosa Municipal Museum of Art (MUMA) is an art museum in Junín, a city in the north of Buenos Aires Province, Argentina.

== Overview ==
The original Municipal Museum of Fine Arts resulted from a 1943 gift to the city by a prominent local sculptor, Ángel María de Rosa, of the bulk of his own works, as well as of the variety of art he had collected in Europe, over the course of numerous travels. The museum was officially commissioned on April 3, 1944, though it lacked its own facilities. Initially maintained by de Rosa and a fellow sculptor, Juan Donato Comuni, the museum relocated to a series of temporary locations. Comuni, however, died in 1962, and de Rosa, in 1970. The municipality ultimately granted the museum the former central market building as its permanent home, in 1978.

Built in 1907 and refurbished for its new use, the Ángel María de Rosa Municipal Museum of Art was inaugurated on May 25, 1978. Maintaining 5 exhibit halls and 900 works, the museum's collection includes paintings, photographs and sculptures by Adolfo Bellocq, Antonio Berni, Alejandro Christophersen, Pío Collivadino, Antonio Pujía, Hermenegildo Sábat, Luís Seoane and Rogelio Yrurtia, as well as sculptures by Comuni and de Rosa. It also includes an auditorium and the Patio de los Artistas, a sculpture garden added during renovations completed in 2007.
