= Ángel María de Rosa =

Argentine sculptor

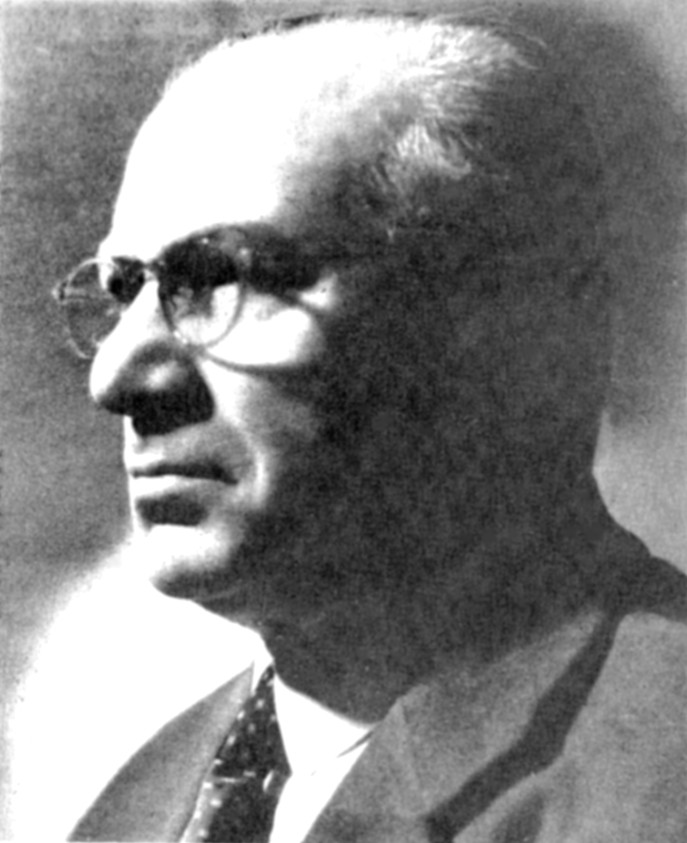
Ángel María de Rosa

Ángel María de Rosa (February 12, 1888 - February 26, 1970) was an Argentine sculptor and philanthropist.

== Life and work ==
Ángel María de Rosa was born in Junín, a pampas city in northern Buenos Aires Province, in 1888. His parents Vicente De Rosa and Maria Pernicola were Italian immigrants. He enrolled in the Society for the Stimulus of Fine Arts, in Buenos Aires, while in his teens, and later transferred to the Bon Marché Arts Academy, where his teachers were renowned local painters Ernesto de la Cárcova and Pío Collivadino.

His training took him to Italy, where he studied at the Florentine Academy, until 1903, and in the Institute of Fine Arts in Rome. Graduating in 1913, he received a First Prize from the Italian Ministry of Education before returning to Argentina. His work, La Visionaria, earned him the same recognition at the Panama–Pacific International Exposition in San Francisco, in 1915. In 1920 he married Franca Pacini in Rome with whom he had one daughter Berta. De Rosa and Pacini divorced in 1938.

He exhibited his plaster, marble and bronze sculptures in 1928 in both Rome and New York City, and at the latter event, he sponsored fellow Argentine artist Benito Quinquela Martín, a landscape painter who would later create Buenos Aires' well-known Caminito.

His 1943 gift of most of his own works, as well as of much of the art he had collected in Europe to his native Junín resulted in the 1944 creation of the Junín Municipal Museum of Fine Arts. Lacking its own facilities, the museum relocated to a series of temporary locations and was initially maintained by de Rosa and a fellow sculptor, Juan Donato Comuni. Comuni's death in 1962, however, was followed by de Rosa's own in 1970, at age 82.

The museum languished after his death, though the city's allocation of an ornate, former market hall led to its re-establishment as the Ángel María de Rosa Municipal Museum of Art, in 1978.
