= Adolfo Bellocq =

Argentine artist (1899–1972)

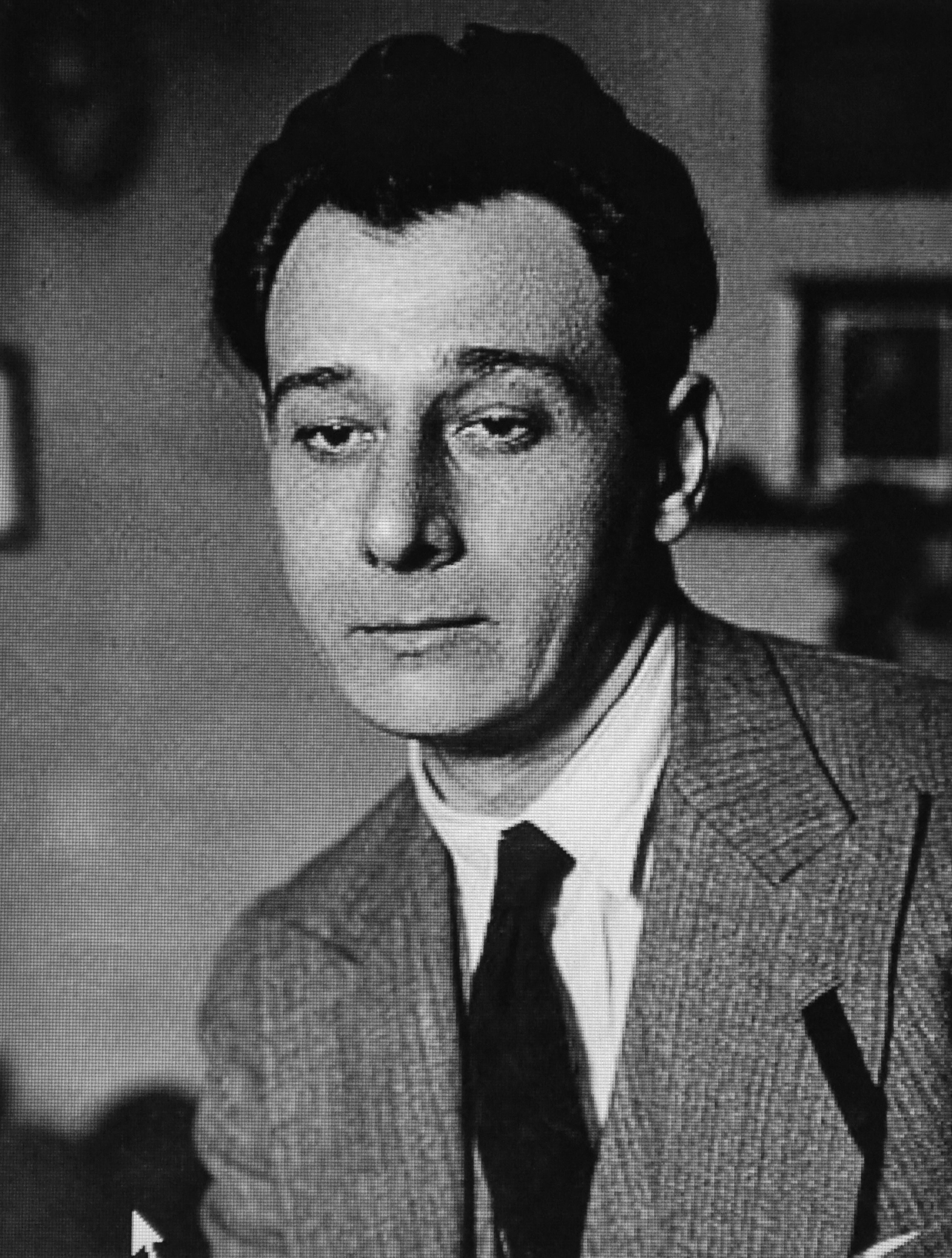
Adolf Bellocq

Adolfo Bellocq (1899–1972) was an influential Argentine artist known for his lithographs.

Born in Buenos Aires, Bellocq was self-taught in the art of xylography and engraving. He was appointed Director of the Lithography Workshop at Buenos Aires' renowned Ernesto de la Cárcova Fine Arts School, in 1928. Soon earning his first awards for in his evocative work portraying harsh working conditions then prevailing in Buenos Aires' southside slaughterhouses, Bellocq parlayed this accomplishment into the first Argentine Lithography Exposition, in 1931. Contributing to Buenos Aires' premier art periodical at the time, Claridád, he began working closely with a number of the magazine's other contributors, forming what became known at the "Boedo Group" (named after the southside avenue where Claridád was published). He also illustrated a number of books, notably a 1930 edition of José Hernández's Martín Fierro.

Bellocq drew the attention of Buenos Aires art patrons like Francisco Colombo and Eduardo Bullrich and was awarded a silver medal at the Paris International Art Exposition of 1937; but, though Colombo and Bullrich financed the curation of over 400 examples, over 2000 of Bellocq's lithographs were lost over the years due to his having made them on newsprint and untreated wooden planks.
