= Antonio Pujía =

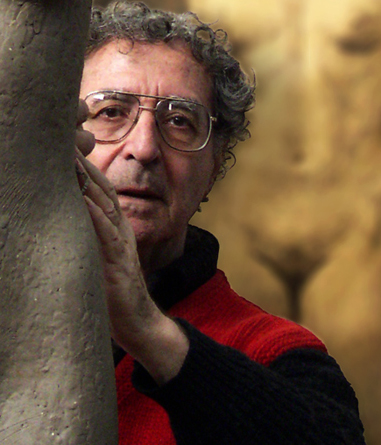
Pujía in his atelier

Antonio Pujía (11 June 1929 – 26 May 2018) was an Argentinian sculptor. His artwork often featured women as well as the topics of famine, war, dance, and music.

== Personal life ==
Antonio Pujía was born in Polia, a small town in Calabria, southern Italy, on June 11, 1929. In May 1937 he immigrated with his mother and older sister Carmela to Argentina, where his father Vittorio (who had traveled when Antonio was only two years old) was expecting them. He began in early childhood to draw common elements of everyday life that he found novel or interesting. Upon his graduation, Pujía's teacher suggested that he should pursue the Fine Arts.

He had a son from his first marriage: Vittorio Pujia, a musician who lives in France. In 1960 he married Susana Nicolai (a psychologist and ceramicist) with whom he had two children: Lino Pujía (an Argentinian filmmaker) and Sandro Pujía (an Argentinian photographer).

His 1975 exhibit at the San Martín Cultural Center was a particular success, and Pujía added his entire warehouse of works to the initial display.

He lived in Spain from 1975 to 1976, working in the Escorial Museum.

Among his most successful later series was that of his "Homage to the Woman," which he began in 2004. Suspending his teaching activities, he devoted subsequent years to developing the project.

== Education ==
Pujía began attending numerous studios in the Buenos Aires in 1943, developing an interest in painting and sculpture. One of his early mentors was the realist sculptor Rogelio Yrurtia. In 1954, he obtained a MFA in Sculpture from the National College of Fine Arts Ernesto de la Cárcova. He also earned a bachelor's degree in Fine Arts from the School of Fine Arts Manuel Belgrano in 1946 and a degree as a Professor of Sculpture from the National School of Fine Arts Prilidiano Pueyrredón in 1950.

== Artistic life ==
=== Colón Theatre: 1956–1970 ===
In 1956, Pujía won a competition to be the head of newly created Scenic Sculpture Workshop Department at the Colón Theatre, continuing working as director until 1970. From this period came his fascination with music and dance, two of his favorite subjects. He regularly attended the dancers' classes and took notes in charcoal on paper. Pujía was close to a number of the opera house's ballet company dancers, and he created a bust of Norma Fontenla (on display at the theatre's foyer). He established his own atelier, and left his post at the Colón Theatre in 1970 to teach at his studio full-time.

=== Jewelry and Mini Sculptures: 1970–2018 ===
Although he did not consider himself a jeweler, he made jewelry by replicating his sculptures at a small scale using beeswax. He used themes of women, couples, children, and dancers. An opening in "Art Gallery" coincided with the birthday of his wife.

I asked her what gift she wanted and she told me a gem [...] I made a breastplate with several figures moving perfectly articulated and attached to the back with a hook. At the opening in the gallery, especially women, did nothing more than ask me about the piece. Because of that, I had a lot of proposals of orders to make rings, etc. That was the way I started in artistic jewelry.

— Pujía in an interview with Leda Devaro, a local artist and blogger.

=== ¿Biafra?: 1971 ===
This series of sculptures referenced the Nigerian Civil War, otherwise known as "Biafra War". It displayed a departure from his previous style, beginning to dramatize social and global problems. ¿Biafra? was inspired by the hunger and death that occur in Africa. Pujía said: "These works are a reflection of the scourge of hunger, I focused on the Biafran guys, but the meaning was wider... because I think that a scourge of this kind is the most unfair thing that we humans can make, with the hunger of our children who are totally helpless and dependent on us." A casual observation of a photograph of a child in Biafra triggered the theme of this Pujía work.

=== Love Series: 1968–2018 ===
With clay, plaster, bronze and marble carvings, Pujía depicted the love of couples. The "Column of Life" was the name given to his sculpture of Carrara marble carving of more than two meters. "I believe in the forces of love. Perhaps because love is the pendulum opposite of the calamities. If we think of aggression, destruction, death, torture exerted by humans to humans, if we think of all that, the love, the couple are just the opposite. Humans have always sailed at infinity, jumping between these two poles: the repulsion and attraction. The destruction and love. Crime and pregnancy. Love is. Even if it last a day, or last fifty years, Love is" said Pujía.

"In the Love Series, men and women have, like in reality, front and back, desires of fusion or moments of loneliness." "The variety of materials, the precious mobility obtained with simple rotary-bases procedures, neatly assembled surfaces – make of his couples that love each other, a mutable and rich world". "The theme of love takes precedence in several respects. Love in the human couple is sublimation in search of integration and unity. The couple is not complemented by binding but in essence is unity, is eternity. In some of his works man and woman are not embracing each other, or do not face each in its entirety, but the only figure is given by half man, half woman, to give one form as the result: the human being is made, integrated that way. So overcome loneliness, in symbiosis with blood and soul and reaches integrity because it feeds on infinity."

In the sculpture "Man - Woman" (1996), the artist Antonio Pujía incorporated some Cubist elements in the arrangement of splitting. By mixing these elements, it continued with the Cubist ideology to "show what you know, not just what you see." In the sculpture "Man - Woman" two figures are represented – a female and a male, which is only recognizable as such by the exhibition of his phallus. By unifying these two entities into one construction, Pujía wanted to represent concept present in most of his art exhibitions: gender equality.

=== Designed medals: 1971–2010 ===
Beginning in 1971, Antonio Pujía created several artistic medals to commemorate private and national events, and reward renowned people. Medals created by Pujía include:

- 1971: Grand Prize SADAIC (Argentina Association of Authors and Composers).
- 1978: TV award of the Argentinian Chamber of Television.
- 1979: SADAIC Awards Medal to authorial right.
- 1980: Plaque commemorating the 80th anniversary of the Colon Theatre.
- 1980: Medal and Trophy for Clarín.
- 1980: Medal commemorating the First Centenary of the Jockey Club of Buenos Aires.
- 1980: Medal to commemorate the 400th anniversary of the founding of Buenos Aires City.
- 1983: Medal to celebrate Argentina´s return to democracy with the inauguration of Raúl Alfonsín.
- 1992: Trophies for Techno Entrepreneurs by the Argentinian Credit Bank.
- 1993: Trophy Award for ARCOR Company.
- 1993: SADAIC homage to Atahualpa Yupanqui.
- 1993: Moon, Grand National Endowment for the Arts Award.
- 1994: Trophy for the opening of the Avenue Theater, and sculpture located in the bearing.
- 1995: Trophy Love Duo by SADAIC.
- 2010: "In union and freedom" Bicentennial Medal of the May Revolution.

== Academic life ==
Pujía said that he had never dreamed of becoming a teacher in his early years of study. "I wanted to learn from my teachers, Fioravanti, Bigatti, Troiano Troiani, and then worked in their studios for a living. Teaching comes in 1949, when I won a prize in the Students and Alumni Association of Fine Arts (MEEBA) and its president called me to give classes. 'Not at all, I did not finish the Pueyrredón' I remember I answered. I resisted a little, and offered me to test a month. Then was born that kind of passion aroused by the teaching, which is a form of learning."

For several decades he taught sculpture in the National College of Fine Arts Ernesto de la Cárcova, the National School of Fine Arts Prilidiano Pueyrredón, and the School of Fine Arts Manuel Belgrano. He was invited every year to give a lecture at UNA (National University of the Arts), in a cycle of "Talks with Leading Exponents of Visual Arts".

For many years until his passing, Pujía dictated seminars on Modeling in Beeswax, in his studio in Floresta neighborhood. The course focused on the ancient technique of using bees in wax sculpture and the diversity of its use both as a raw material to keep the pieces in wax and its application to lost-wax casting for both large and small pieces of jewelry.

== Awards ==
- 2010 - Distinction "Italian Roots in Argentina" by Comitatis Degli Italiani All Estero
- 1992 - Illustrious citizen of Buenos Aires
- 1992 - Premio "Recorrido Dorado" S.D.D.R.A
- 1983 - Premio "Palmas Joaquín V. Gonzalez", Gobierno provincia de La Rioja
- 1982 - Cavalieri Ordine al merito della Repubblica italiana
- 1982 - Fundación Konex, Premio destinado a las mejores figuras de las Artes Visuales Argentinas.
- 1981 - Premio Adquisición Gobierno de Santa Fe LVIII Salón Annual de Artes Plásticas. Museo de Bellas Artes, Santa Fe
- 1980 - Premio Revista "Salimos"
- 1974 - Rotary Club de Buenos Aires, Ateneo Rotario, Laurel de Plata
- 1973 - First Prize 50 Aniversario Salón Annual de Santa Fe
- 1972 - First Prize del Salón Nacional de Tucumán
- 1972 - Premio Especial Medalla de Oro Salón IPCLAR, Provincia de Santa Fe.
- 1971 - Premio a la Mejor Muestra del Fondo Nacional de las Artes
- 1970 - Dirección de Turismo Award, Salón annual de Tucumán
- 1966 - Grand Prize in the Primera Bienal de Escultura de la Municipalidad de Quilmes
- 1966 - First Prize Salón de Artes Plásticas de Campana, Provincia de Buenos Aires
- 1964 - Dr. Augusto Palanza Award
- 1960 - Grand Prize of Honor del Salón Nacional
- 1959 - Grand Prize at the Salón Municipal Manuel Belgrano
