= Pío Collivadino =

Argentine painter

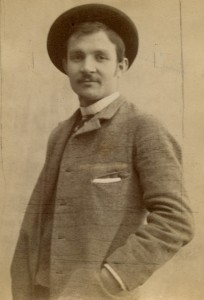
- Collivadino, c. 1900
- Born: August 20, 1869; Buenos Aires, Argentina
- Died: August 26, 1945 (aged 76); Buenos Aires
- Known for: Painter
- Notable work: La hora del almuerzo (1903); Usinas (1914)
- Movement: Post-Impressionist
- Awards: Gold medal, Universal Exposition of 1904; Order of the Crown of Italy, 1905

Pío Collivadino (August 20, 1869 – August 26, 1945) was an Argentine painter of the Post-Impressionist school.

== Life and work ==
Pío Collivadino was born in Buenos Aires, in 1869. He studied drawing at the Italian Argentine cultural society, the Societá Nazionale de Buenos Aires, and in 1889, he traveled to Rome, where in 1891 he was accepted into the Accademia di San Luca, the National Academy of Fine Arts. There, he was mentored by Cesare Mariani, and collaborated in decorative frescoes in the Constitutional Court of Italy.

He returned to Argentina in 1896 and became known for his romanticist lithographs. Collivadino attended three international festivals in Venice, from 1903 to 1907, where his La hora del reposo (Workday Break, 1903), also known as La hora del almuerzo (Lunch break time) earned a gold medal. He was also at the 1904 Louisiana Purchase Exposition, in St. Louis, where he earned a silver and a gold medal.

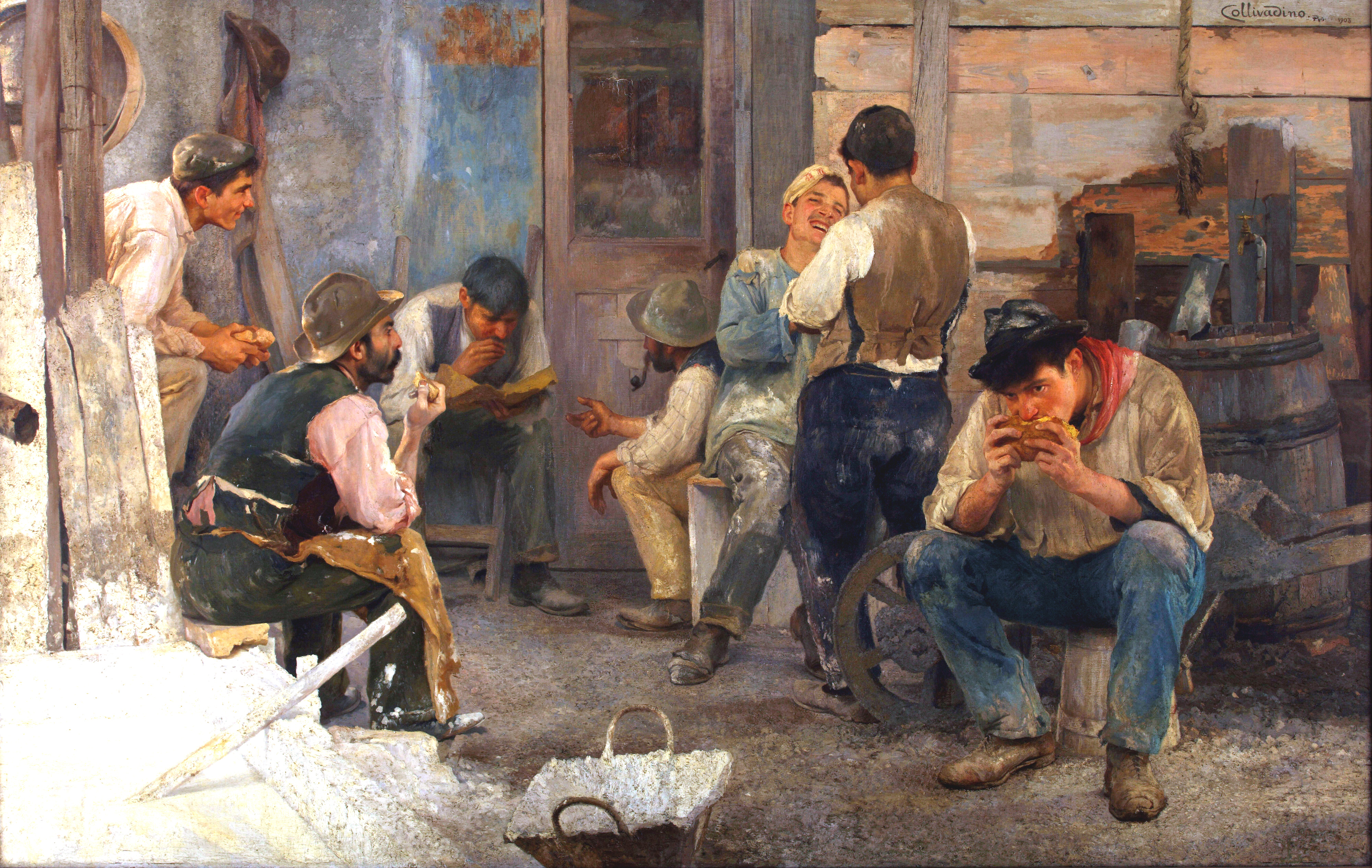
La hora del almuerzo, 1903.

These successes encouraged him to transition to Post-impressionism, a genre which had not yet found favor among Argentine art patrons, and he joined the Nexus Group in 1907. The group, led by painters Fernando Fader and Martín Malharro, and sculptor Rogelio Yrurtia, braved initial ostracism and helped popularize the genre locally. Honored with the Order of the Crown of Italy in 1905, Collivadino became an honorary member of the Accademia di Brera, in Milan.

Collivadino remained sought after in Argentina, and served in numerous art juries. He was named Director of the Academy of Fine Arts in 1908, and was prominent in Buenos Aires' Centennial International Exposition, in 1910. Subsequent years saw the creation of Collivadino's best-known works, including Usinas (Power Plants, 1914). Collivadino was named director of scenography at the renowned Colón Theatre and remained head of the Academy of Fine Arts and taught there until his retirement in 1935.

He helped organize the Prilidiano Pueyrredón School of Fine Arts in 1939, and the Ernesto de la Cárcova Museum, in 1941. Collivadino served as the director of the Pueyrredón School until 1944, when he was forced to retire by the new military regime of General Pedro Pablo Ramírez (a dictatorship whose cultural policy was hostile to European influences, in favor of what it described as "criollo virtues").

A 1946 young graduate of the Prilidiano Pueyrredón School of Fine Arts and one of Collivadino's last students, famed painter, cartoonist, journalist and author Geno Díaz (Eugenio Díaz del Bo), described those circumstances in his 1984 autobiography, stating that:

On the 4th of June [1943], the revolution erupted and expelled the school’s director, don Pío Collivadino, a man of a great technical knowledge, a distinguished artist who had devoted his life to the School. He was cruelly replaced by one of those incompetent perverts, and the illustrious elderly master died of sadness. It was one more crime, among many others, of fascism in Argentina.

The noted painter and teacher died in Buenos Aires, in 1945, at age 76.

== Bibliography ==
- Scocco, Graciela. Imágenes de Buenos Aires en la obra de Pìo Collivadino. Una interpretaciòn desde las noticias a la plàstica. En: Saavedra, Marìa Inès. "La ciudad revelada. Lecturas de Buenos Aires: urbanismo, estètica y crìtica de arte en La Naciòn, 1915-1925". Buenos Aires, Editorial Vestales, 2004
