= José Manuel Estrada =

Argentine lawyer, writer and politician

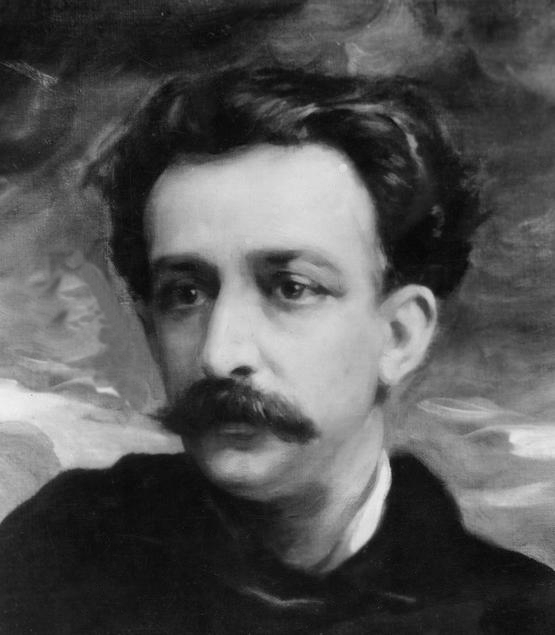
José M. Estrada

José Manuel Estrada (born in Buenos Aires el 13 July 1842; died in Asunción, Paraguay, 17 September 1894) was an Argentine lawyer, writer, politician, eminent speaker, and representative of Catholic thought.

== Biography ==
José Manuel Estrada, with other thinkers and political defenders of Catholic thought such as Pedro Goyena and Emilio Lamarca, stood out in Argentinean history for their firm opposition to the Secularism that characterized the government of the country between the second half of the 19th century and the first decades of the 20th century.

President Sarmiento designated him Secretary of External Relationships and head of the General Department of Schools. He was elected deputy for Buenos Aires (1873–1876). He founded the newspaper The Argentinean. Between 1876 and 1888 he acted as Rector of the National School of Buenos Aires.

He made an important contribution to the Pedagogic Congress of 1882, where it was agreed that the state school system should be Catholic, maintaining this position in a long debate with Leandro Alem. This was opposed to the Law 1420 of 1884 for public, free and compulsory teaching that established the lay public school system. He was also opposed to the Law of civil marriage sanctioned in 1888, representing the opinion of the Catholic thinkers.

In 1885 he was appointed president of the recently founded Catholic Union. In 1888 he was re-elected as national deputy.

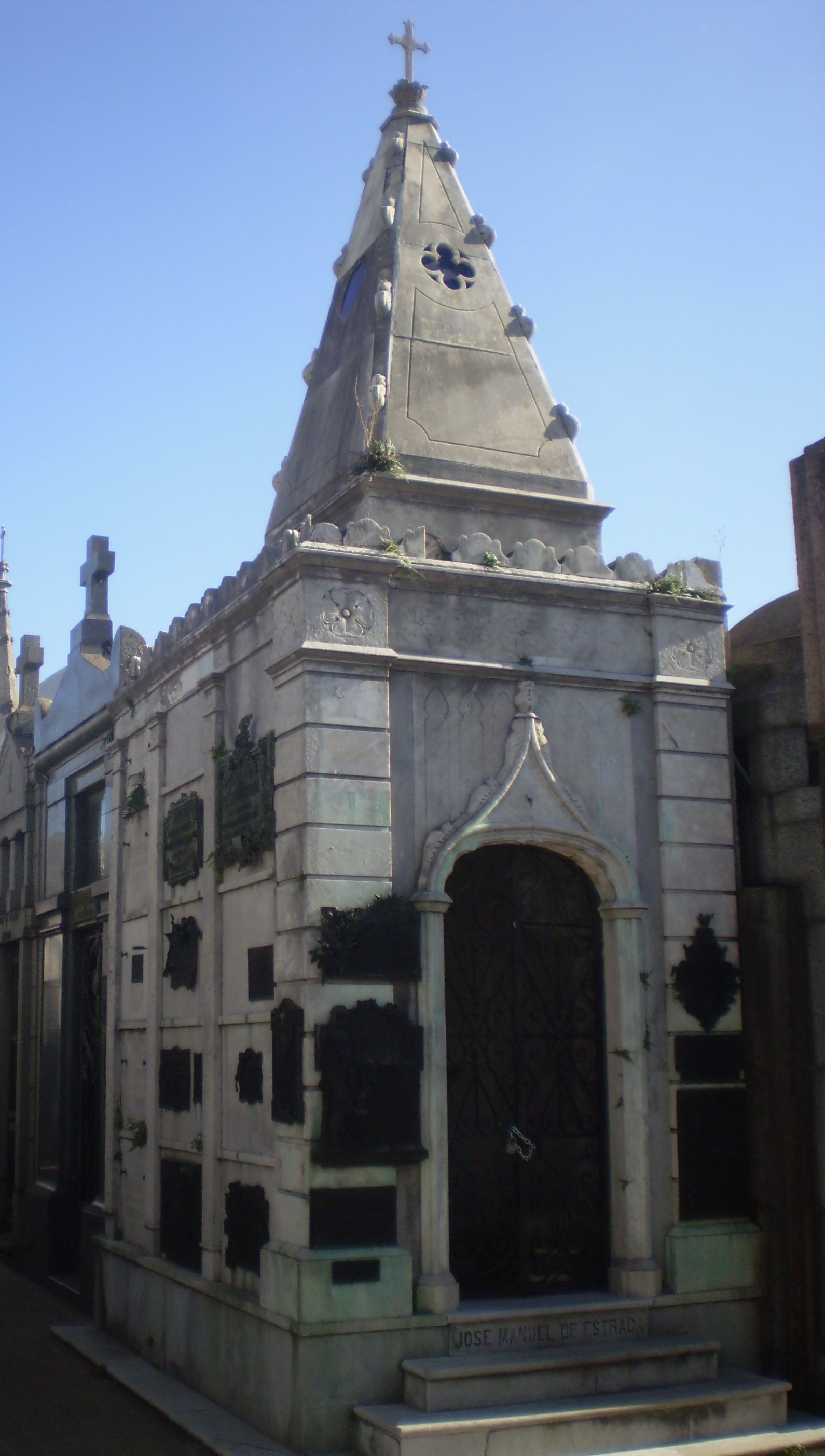
His tomb in the cemetery of the Recoleta

He taught Constitutional Rights and Administrative Rights in the University of Buenos Aires and he stood out as a journalist in the magazine The Union that he directed along with Pedro Goyena and Tristán Achával Rodríguez, where they defended their positions in opposition to the liberal reforms of the governments of that time, whose main advocate was Julio Argentino Roca.

In 1891 he accepted the position of Plenipotentiary Minister in Paraguay, where he died in 1894.

His remains lie in the cemetery of La Recoleta. A monument was erected to him in the Plaza Loria in 1947.

His death is commemorated annually on September 17 in Argentina.

== Publications ==
- El génesis de nuestra raza, 1861.
- El catolicismo y la democracia, 1862.
- Ensayo histórico sobre la revolución de los comuneros del Paraguay en el siglo XVIII, 1865.
- Lecciones sobre la Historia de la República Argentina (Recopilación de sus clases en el Colegio Normal)

== Bibliography ==
- Corbiere, Emilio J. (1980). "Liberales y católicos en el 80". Vol. Diciembre, no. 163. Todo es Historia.
- Cosmelli Ibáñez, José Luis (1975). Historia cultural de los argentinos. Buenos Aires: Troquel.
