= Landmarks in Buenos Aires =

There are many landmarks in Buenos Aires, Argentina, some of which are of considerable historical or artistic interest.

== Monuments ==
=== Monumento de los Españoles ===
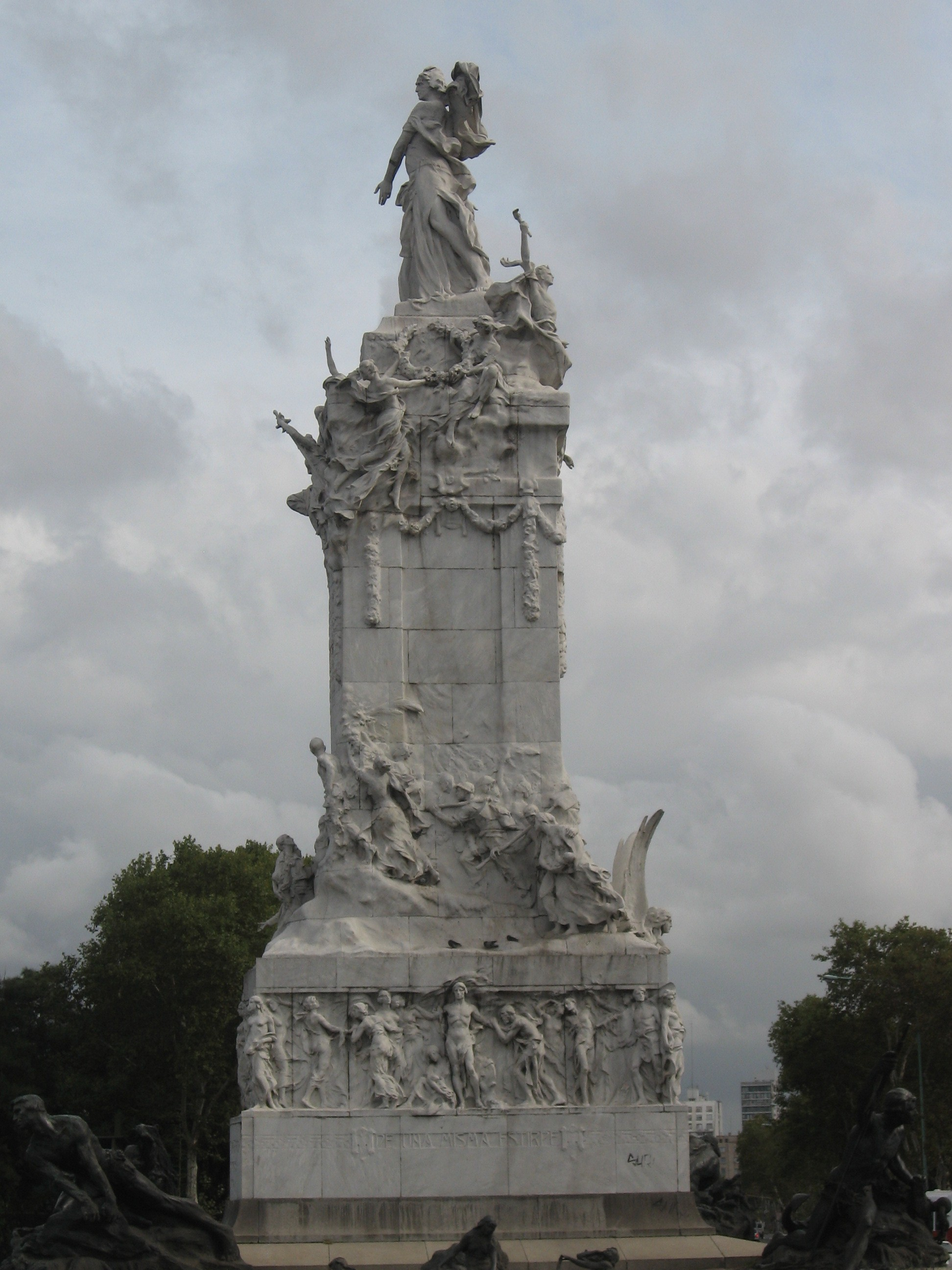
Monument to the Spaniards

The "Monumento a La Carta Magna y las Cuatro Regiones Argentinas" is situated in the Sarmiento y Libertador avenues part of the Palermo district. It was raised by the Spanish community in 1910 for the Centennial of the Revolution of May, and it is commonly referred to as the "Spanish Monument" ("Monumento De los Españoles"). The colossal work is 24.5 meters high, created in marble from Carrara and brass by the Spanish sculptor Agustí Querol Subirats.

In March 1916, the ocean liner Príncipe de Asturias from Barcelona was wrecked 90 miles from Rio de Janeiro. In this accident, more than 450 people died and the load of marble ornaments and brass that composed the statuary of the monument was lost in the depths of the ocean. The following year, replicas were requested for those lost in the shipwreck. Finally, May 25, 1927 the count of Amalfi, on behalf of the king Alfonso XIII, made a symbolic delivery of the work to the president Marcelo Torcuato de Alvear.

=== Monument of General Manuel Belgrano ===
This monument of the general Manuel Belgrano, one of the greatest heroes of Argentine History, is in the Plaza de Mayo. It is a bronze equestrian statue on a large granite pedestal, showing Belgrano holding aloft the flag of Argentina. It was inaugurated in 1873, created by the French sculptor Albert-Ernest Carrier-Belleuse and Argentine Manuel de Santa Coloma. The monument was erected by public funding in gratitude to the general.

Manuel Belgrano was an economist, lawyer, politician, and military leader, born in Buenos Aires. He founded the Escuela de Naútica (School of Navigation) in 1799. After the Spanish rule was overthrown in 1810, Belgrano was appointed general by the first autonomous government of Argentina. Belgrano led an ill-fated military campaign to Paraguay, and also led the Jujuy Exodus, which prepared the ground for victories of the Argentine War of Independence in the northwest of the country in the Battle of Tucumán (1812) and Battle of Salta (1813). Belgrano was one of the leaders of the Argentine Declaration of Independence, promulgated on July 9, 1816.

=== Monument of the Two Congresses ===
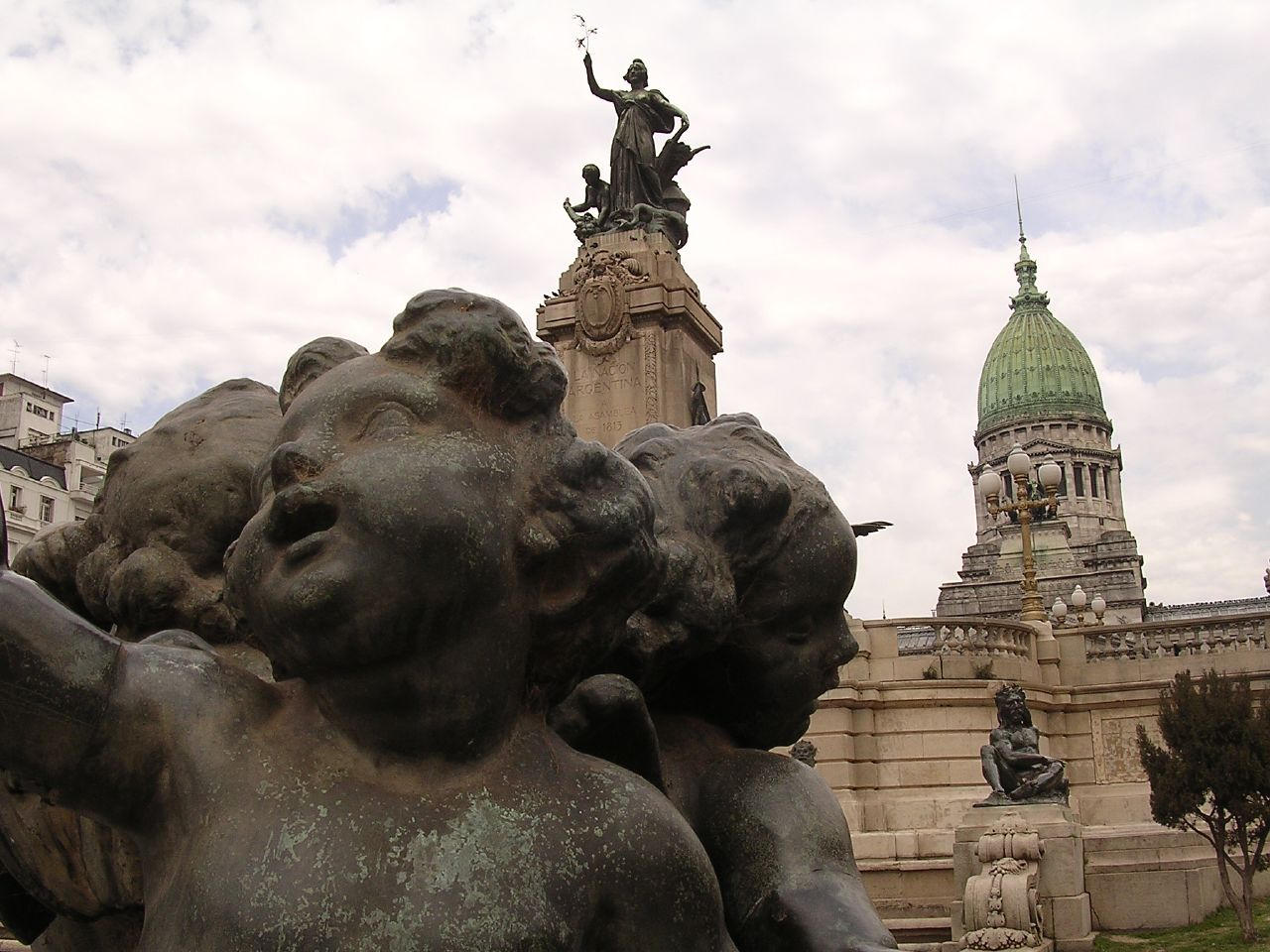
Monument of the Two Congresses

The Monumento de los dos Congresos in the Plaza des los Dos Congresos in the Monserrat district, was created in stone from Nancy. The monument was designed by the Belgian architect Eugène D'Huicque and the bronze statues are the work of the Belgian artist Jules Lagae. It was created in Brussels, finished in 1909, and inaugurated in Buenos Aires on July 9, 1914

The monument celebrates the centenary of the 1816 declaration of independence. The central figure represents the Republic on the march, with snake faces and an allegory of abundance at its feet. The two lateral figures represent the assembly of 1813 and the congress of 1816. There are also other representations of national fauna, notably of horses and condors.

=== Mast in Plaza Colombia ===
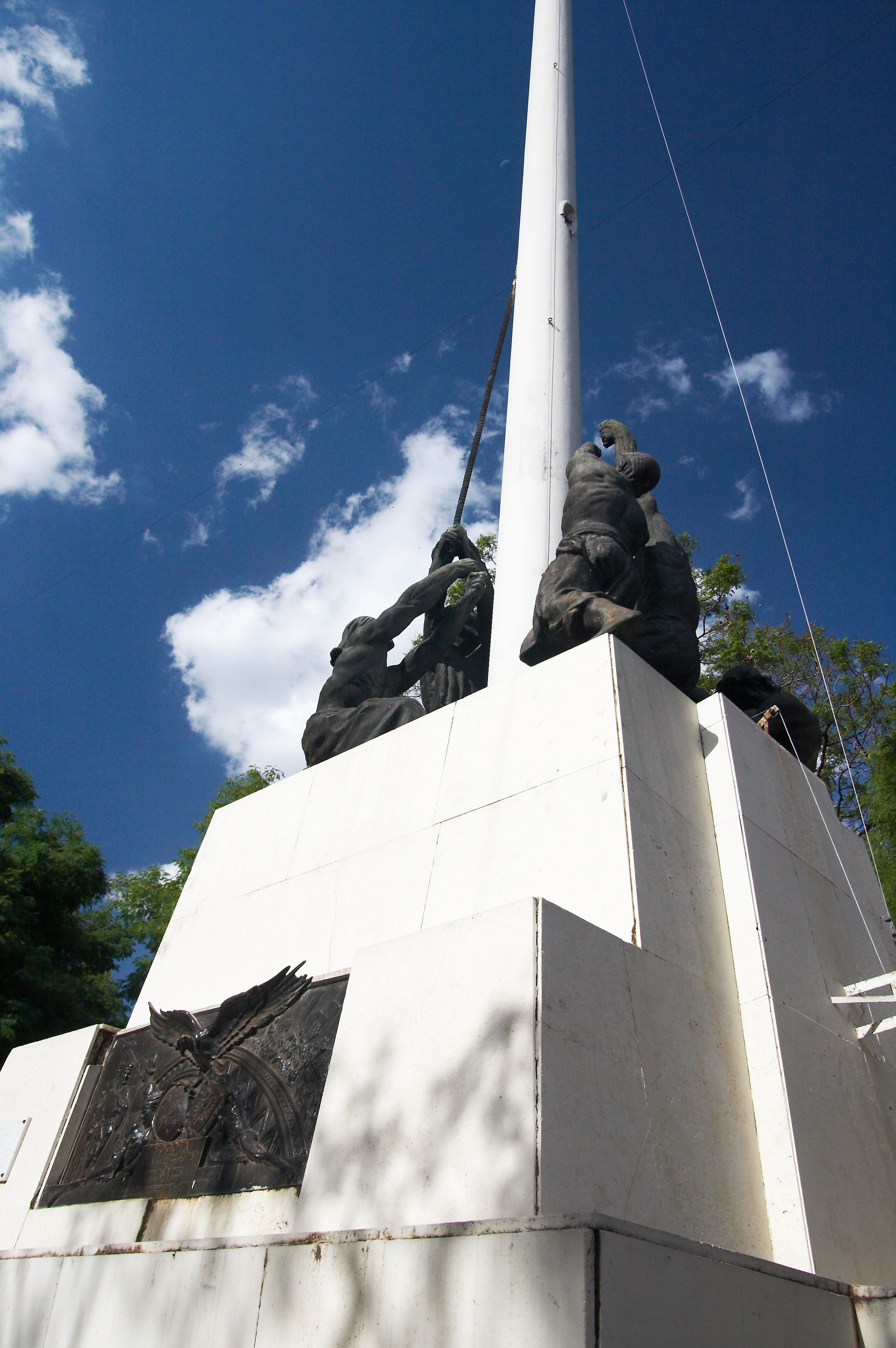
Mast in Plaza Colombia

This mast is in the center of the Plaza Colombia, in the Barracas district. The mast and brass sculptural group: "Hoisting the Flag" was created by the sculptor Julio C. Vergottini. The brass piece was cast in Colombia and donated by the Government of Bogotá to Buenos Aires in 1940.

=== Monument to Christopher Columbus ===
The monument of Christopher Columbus (ca. 1451-1506) was located between La Casa Rosada (government house) and La Avenida La Rabida. The monument was a gift celebrating the 1910 Centennial of Argentinean independence from Spain, from the Buenos Aires Italian community, led by Italian immigrant Antonio Devoto.

A work of the Italian sculptor Arnoldo Zocchi, the foundation stone of the monument was placed on May 24, 1910, but the monument was not inaugurated until June 15, 1921. The monument is 26 meters tall and weighs 623 tons. The column in the center was made of a single 6.25m tall block of Carrara marble that weighed 38 tons. The monument was created in Italy, divided into nineteen sections, and shipped to Buenos Aires, where it arrived on April 14, 1921. It suffered some damage during a bombardment in 1955. In June 2013 the monument was taken down causing a controversy and replaced by a monument to mestiza revolutionary fighter in the War of Independence, Juana Azurduy de Padilla, which itself was subsequently moved.

=== Monument to José Manuel Estrada ===
This monument in the Plaza Loria is to the late-19th-century historian, journalist and publicist José Manuel Estrada, a leading Catholic intellectual and politician in Buenos Aires in the second half of the 19th century.

The sculpture of Estrada was ordered in 1937 by the municipality of Buenos Aires and inaugurated on 11 November 1947. It was created by the sculptor Héctor Rocha, who also created a statue of General Manuel Belgrano in the plaza Manuel Belgrano, inaugurated in 1961, and the Monumento a Guillermo Rawson described below.

=== Monument to Giuseppe Garibaldi ===
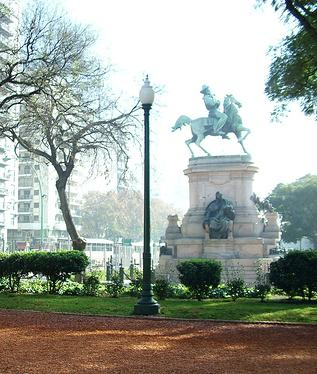
Monument to Giuseppe Garibaldi in Plaza Italia

The Monument to Giuseppe Garibaldi is an equestrian sculpture featuring Giuseppe Garibaldi, located on Plaza Italia, in the Palermo neighbourhood of Buenos Aires, Argentina.

Giuseppe Garibaldi was an Italian military and political figure. In his twenties, he joined the Carbonari Italian patriot revolutionaries, and had to flee Italy after a failed insurrection. He then contributed to the independence of Uruguay, leading the Italian Legion in the Uruguayan Civil War, and afterwards returned to Italy as a commander in the conflicts of the Risorgimento. He has been dubbed the "Hero of the Two Worlds" in tribute to his military expeditions in both South America and Europe.

Donated to the city by Italian residents, the monument was built by Italian sculptor Eugenio Maccagnani as a replica of the one located in Brescia, Italy, and was inaugurated on June 19, 1904.

=== Monument to General Juan Lavalle ===
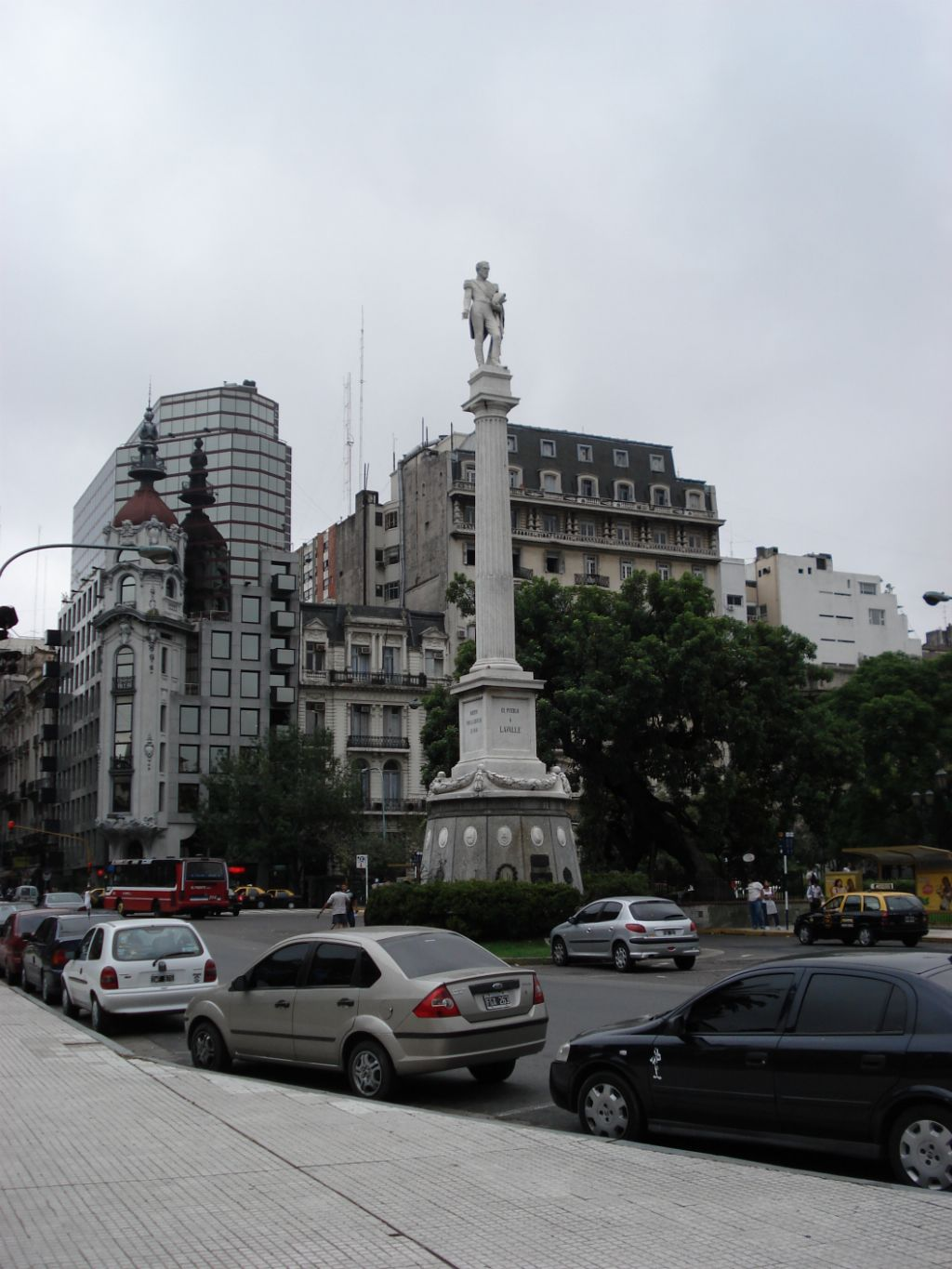
Lavalle

The monument is the work of the sculptor Pedro Costa, located in a circle on Tucumán street. It is made of marble and sandstone. It has a strong base and a column that supports the statue. It was carried out by the initiative of a Commission presided over by Bartolomé Mitre during the intendency of Torcuato of Alvear.

Juan Lavalle was in the army that besieged Montevideo in 1813. He continued to participate in the struggles between the successor states of the Spanish provinces, fighting with great bravery and steadily rising in rank. In the Battle of Ituzaingó in February 1827, he beat the forces of General Abreu and was himself proclaimed General on the field of battle. Lavalle organised the Unitarian revolution of December 1828, after which he was chosen governor of Buenos Aires Province. One of his unfortunate decisions was to execute former governor Manuel Dorrego, which ignited a civil war. After the Convention of Barracas agreement with Juan Manuel de Rosas, he retired to the Banda Oriental (nowadays Uruguay) In 1839, with support from exiled objectors to Rosas' government, he arrived in Entre Ríos Province and advanced towards Buenos Aires in order to overthrow Rosas. However, he was unsuccessful and was accidentally shot dead in 1841.

By a "strange coincidence" the Monumento al General Lavalle was erected in front of the residence of Felicia Dorrego, the former governor's daughter.

=== Monument to Mariano Moreno ===
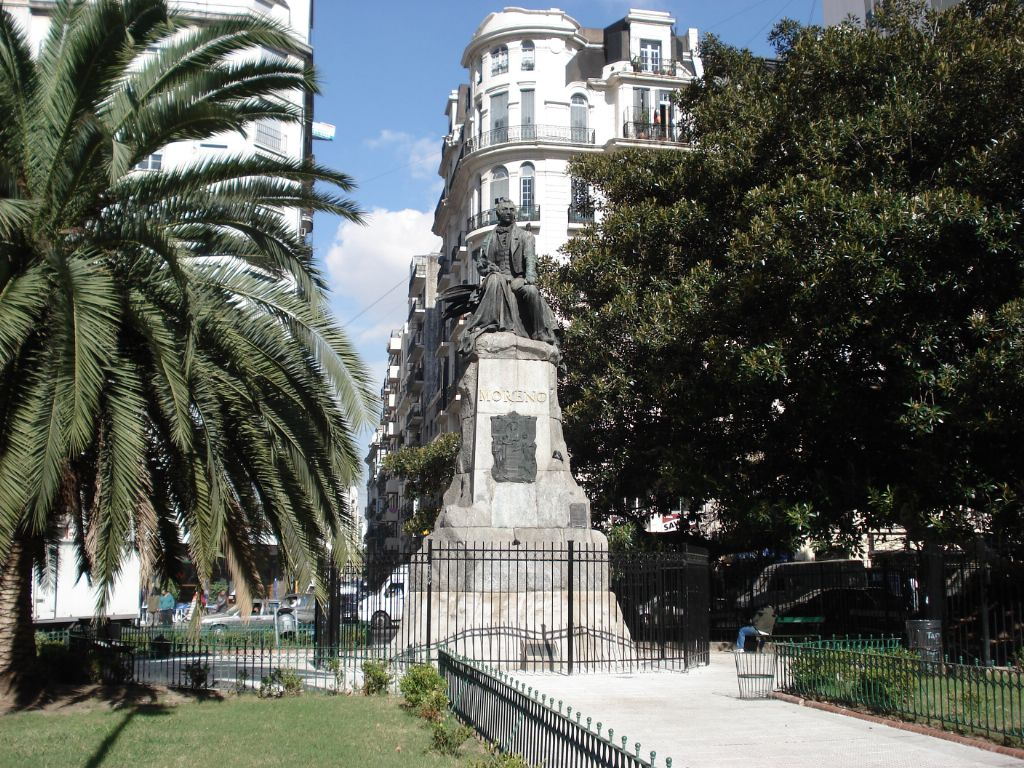
Mariano Moreno

The monument to Mariano Moreno is in Plaza Mariano Moreno. It opened on 1 October 1910. The statue was created by Miguel Blay y Fábregas.

Mariano Moreno was a lawyer, journalist and politician who played a decisive role in the May Revolution that led to the declaration of independence of Argentina from Spain. Moreno was a secretary in the First Junta that replaced the viceroy of Spain. He suppressed the uprising of Santiago de Liniers in Córdoba (whom he had executed later), and organized the liberating expedition to Upper Peru. He was then removed from office by Cornelio Saavedra.

Moreno created the first Argentine newspaper, La Gazeta de Buenos Aires. He summarized his thoughts on economics in his 1809 book Representación de los hacendados y labradores, which, following the physiocratic doctrine, proposed the stimulation of agriculture to develop an economy that was very dependent on international trade and its undesirable consequence, contraband.

=== Pirámide de Mayo ===
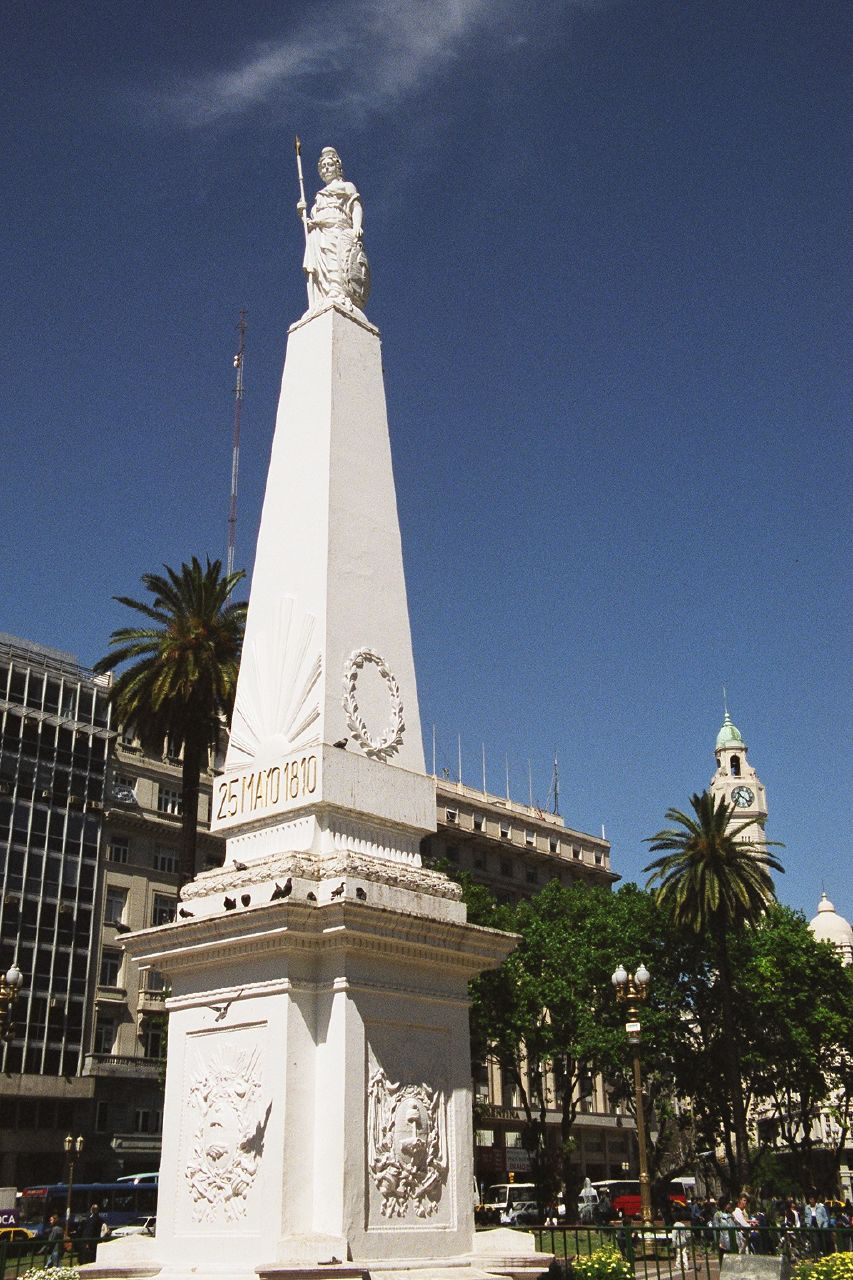
Pirámide de Mayo, July 2005.

The Pirámide de Mayo ("May Pyramid"), located in the center of the Plaza de Mayo, is the oldest national monument in Buenos Aires. Its construction was ordered in 1811 by the Primera Junta to celebrate the first anniversary of the May Revolution. It was renovated in 1856, under the direction of Prilidiano Pueyrredón. In 1912, after having undergone numerous modifications, it was moved 63 meters to the east, with the idea that a much larger monument would eventually be constructed around it.

The monument is crowned by an allegory of Liberty, the work of the French sculptor Joseph Dubourdieu. From the ground to the peak of the statue's Phrygian cap, the Pyramid measures 18.76 meters.

=== Monument to Bartolomé Mitre ===
The Monumento a Bartolomé Mitre in the Plaza Mitre was created by the Italian sculptors Luis Calandra, David and Eduardo Rubino. It is an imposing work carried out in white Carrara marble that dominates the square from the high part of the ravine.

Bartolomé Mitre Martinez was a statesman, military figure, and author. He was the President of Argentina from 1862 to 1868. As a liberal, he was an opponent of Juan Manuel de Rosas, and was forced into exile where he worked as a soldier and journalist in Uruguay, Bolivia, Peru, and Chile. Mitre returned to Argentina after the defeat of Rosas. He led the revolt of Buenos Aires against Justo José de Urquiza's federal system, and was appointed to important posts in the provincial government after Buenos Aires seceded from the Confederation. Mitre was also the founder of La Nación, one of South America's leading newspapers. He wrote poetry and fiction. He translated Dante's La divina commedia (The Divine Comedy) into Spanish.

=== Puente de la Mujer ===
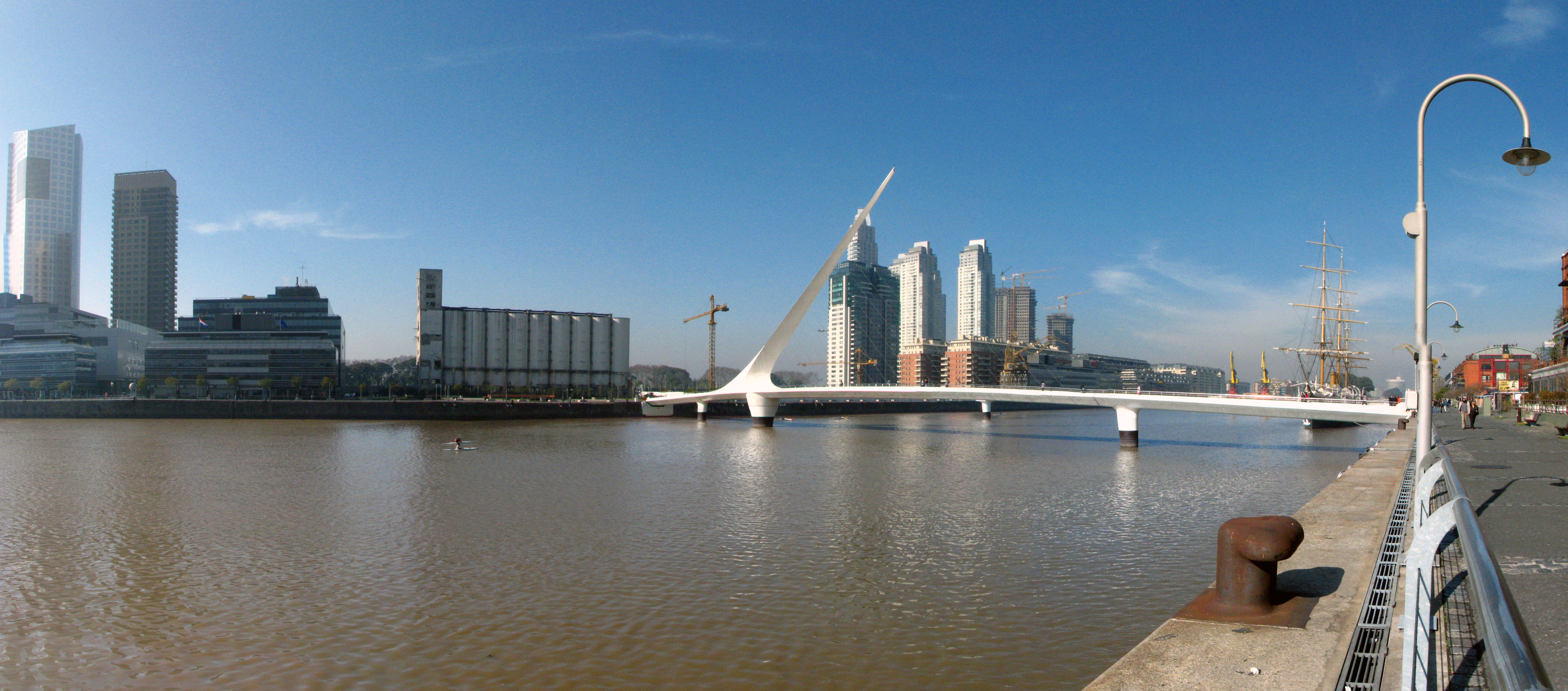
Puente de la Mujer – The short pylon seen below and beyond the cantilever spar is the resting place when the bridge is open

The Puente de la Mujer, in the Puerto Madero district, is a pedestrian bridge opened in 2001. It was designed by Valencian architect and engineer Santiago Calatrava. The bridge is 160 meters long and 6 meters wide, with a metallic mast that rises 39 meters. The bridge swings aside when a ship needs to pass through. The bridge was built in Spain and moved in parts to Buenos Aires in many shipments. Artistically, the author states that the work represent the figure of a couple dancing tango, where the white mast represents the man, and the curved silhouette of the bridge represents the woman.

=== Las Nereidas ===
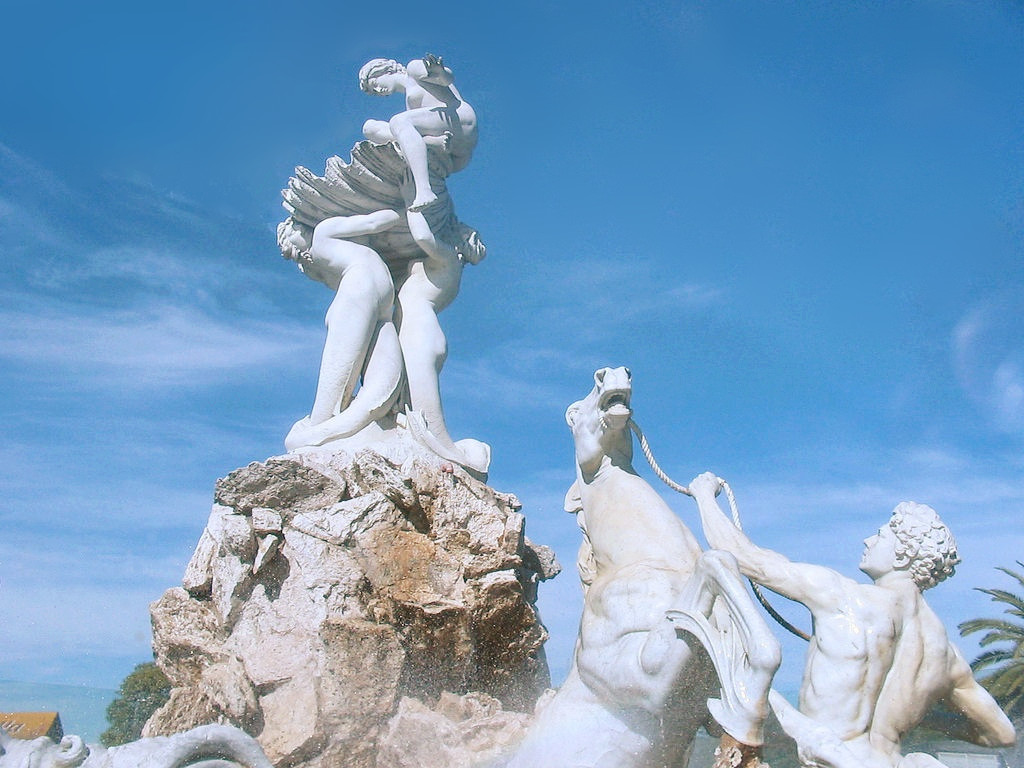
Las Nereidas by Lola Mora

The Monumento Las Nereidas, or "Font of the Nereids", is now located at "Costanera Sur". It was created by Lola Mora, in 1903. The sensuous and erotic sculpture met bureaucratic problems at the city's Deliberative Council, which had it moved from place to place.

Lola Mora was a rebel and a pioneer of women rights in her artistic field. At 20 years of age she began painting portraits, but soon turned to sculpting marble and granite. She studied art in her home province and then, with a scholarship, in Rome, Italy, where she created her greatest works, some of them by request of the Argentine government. In 1900 she was charged with creating two bas-reliefs for the Historical House of Tucumán (seat of Argentina's Declaration of Independence of 1816).

=== The Obelisk ===
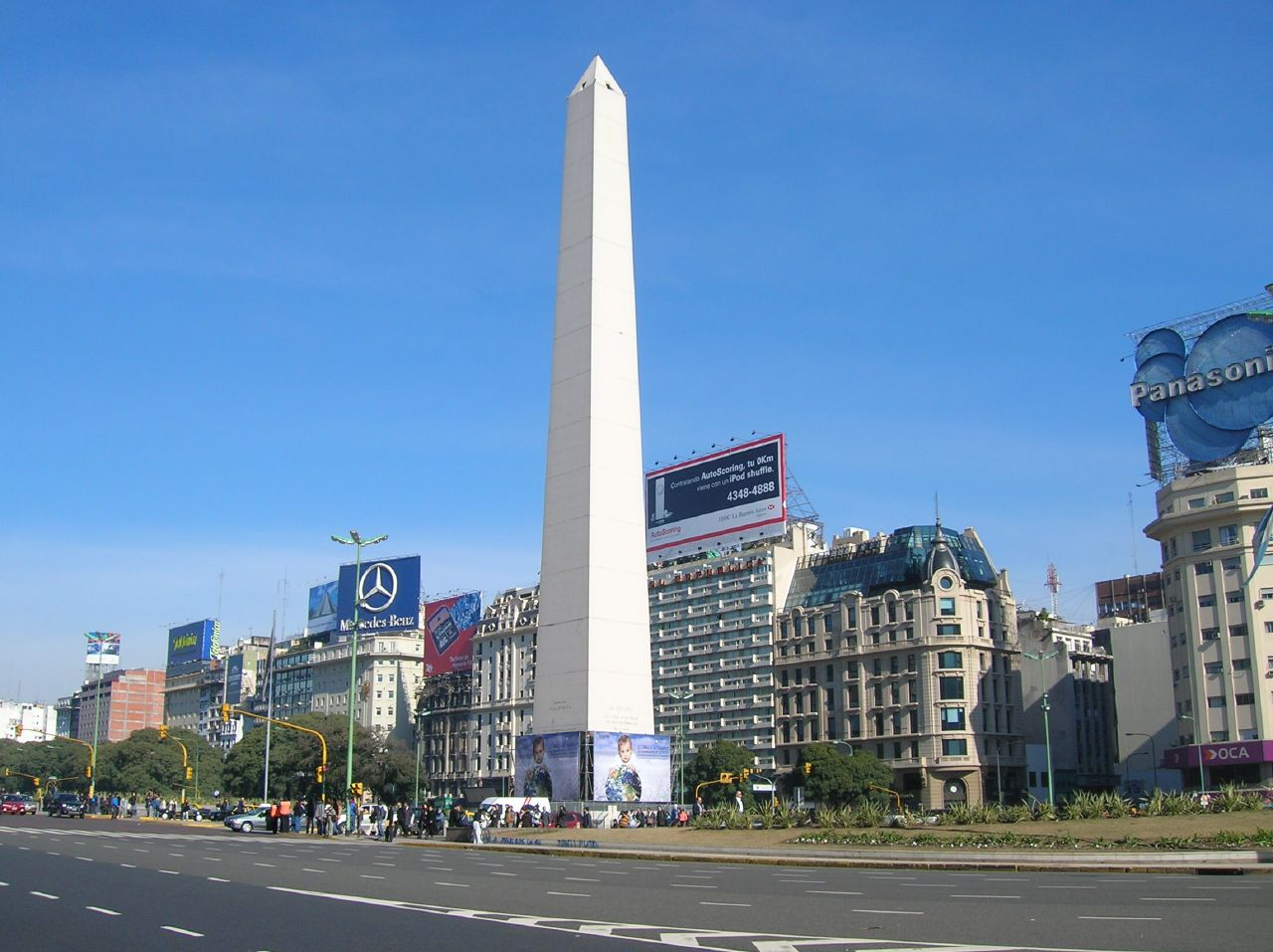
The Obelisk.

The Obelisk (Spanish: Obelisco de Buenos Aires) is one of the city's most famous landmarks and a venue for various cultural activities and other events. It is placed at the heart of Buenos Aires. Porteños refer to it simply as El Obelisco.

The obelisk was built in May 1936 to commemorate the 400th anniversary of the first founding of the city. It is located in the center of the Plaza de la República (Republic Square), the spot where the Argentine flag was flown for the first time in Buenos Aires, at the intersection of Nueve de Julio and Corrientes avenues. Its total height is 67 meters (220 feet) and its base area is 49 square meters (530 square feet). It was designed by architect Alberto Prebisch, and its construction took barely four weeks.

The obelisk is one of the main icons of the city, and a venue for various cultural activities (usually sponsored by the city government) and other events. It is the traditional gathering spot for sports fans to celebrate when their favourite team wins, especially from the national football team, often resulting in colorful events that attract media coverage. It was also used by several acrobatic troupes to perform high-wire acts.

=== Monument to Guillermo Rawson ===
Monumento Guillermo Rawson

The Monumento a Guillermo Rawson is another bronze statue created by Héctor Rocha. The marble base has the figures of Reason and Science. On the right side a virile figure in Roman attire symbolizes Eloquence and a seated figure on the left side represents Knowledge. Inscribed on the front of the shaft is Laus - Virtus - 1821-1890.

Guillermo Rawson was a doctor and one of the most influential politicians in nineteenth century Argentina. In 1853 he was jailed for opposing Nazario Benavidez, the de facto governor of San Juan. The following year he was a member of the Paraná Congress, and from 1862 he was Interior Minister in the government of Bartolomé Mitre.

As Interior Minister in 1862 he met Captain Love Jones-Parry and Lewis Jones who were on their way to Patagonia to investigate whether it was suitable for the creation of a Welsh settlement there. Rawson came to an agreement that resulted in the creation of a colony in the Chubut Valley in the following years. The city of Rawson, the capital of the province of Chubut was named after him.

=== Monument to Julio Argentino Roca ===
The Monumento a Julio Argentino Roca was inaugurated on October 19, 1941 in the plazoleta Ricardo Tanturi at the intersection of Av. Julio A. Roca and Peru street. It has a base of marble with two imposing figures, Fatherland and Work, and a granite pedestal crowned by an equestrian sculpture in brass made by the Uruguayan sculptor José Zorrilla of San Martin. Recently the monument has been defaced with graffiti, despite being fenced.

Julio Argentino Roca was an army general who served as President of Argentina from 1880 to 1886 and again from 1898 to 1904. While in the army, he applied ruthless measures to subdue or destroy the Indian communities of the Pampas, and it was these successes that led to his first election as president shortly after suppressing an attempted revolution by Carlos Tejedor.

=== Monument to Juan Manuel de Rosas ===
The Monument to Juan Manuel de Rosas was inaugurated on November 8, 1999. Is located in Intendente Seeber square, Palermo neighbourhood. The monument was created by Ricardo Dallia Lasta.

Has a major monument to Juan Manuel de Rosas, surrounded by a high fence.

Juan Manuel de Rosas ruled Argentina from 1829 to 1852. Rosas was one of the first famous caudillos in Ibero-America and through his rule united Argentina, provided an efficient government and strengthened the economy.

=== Monument to General San Martin ===
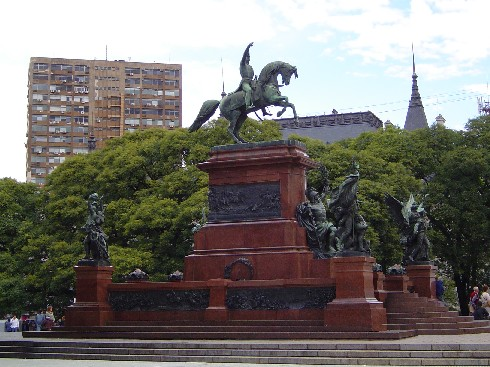
General San Martin

This monument to General José de San Martín is in the Plaza San Martín. It was created by Louis-Joseph Daumas in 1862.

San Martín was the prime leader of the southern part of South America's successful struggle for independence from Spain. He is the national hero of Argentina.

== Official Buildings ==
=== Cabildo ===
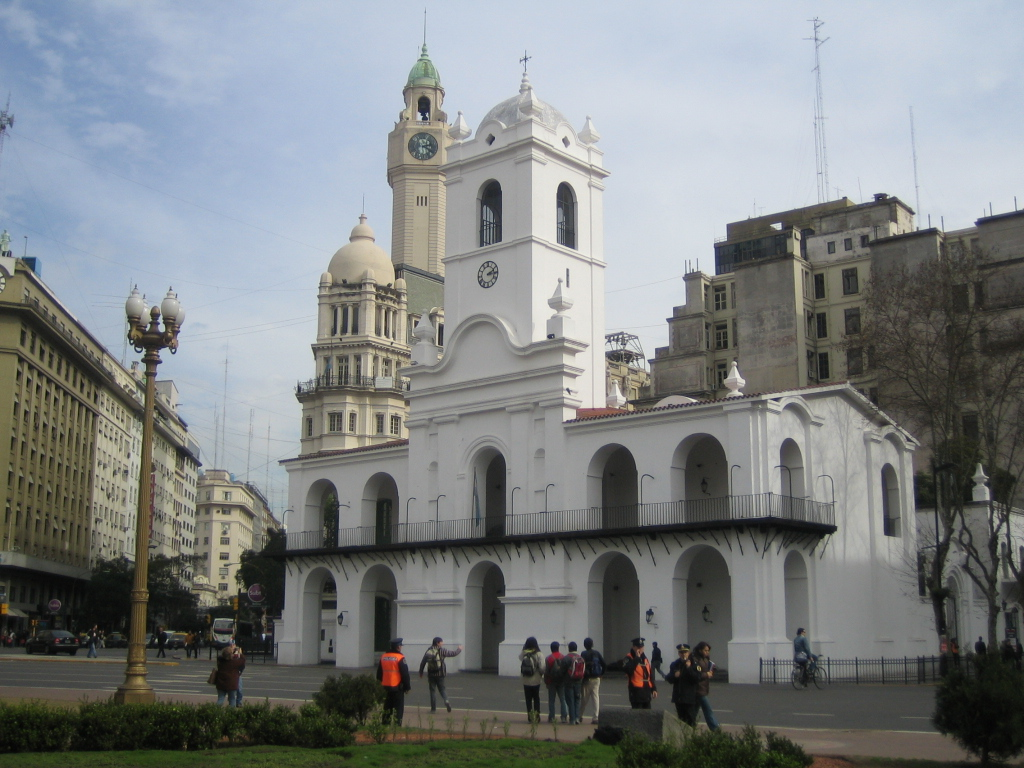
Buenos Aires Cabildo.

The Cabildo building was used as the government house during the colonial times of the Viceroyalty of the River Plate. The original building was finished in 1610 but was soon found to be too small and had to be expanded. Over the years many changes have been made. In 1940, the architect Mario Buschiazzo reconstructed the colonial features of the Cabildo using various original documents.

Currently, the Cabildo hosts the National Museum of the Cabildo and the May Revolution (Museo Nacional del Cabildo y la Revolución de Mayo), in which paintings, artifacts, clothes and jewellery of the 18th century are on display. The patio of the Cabildo still has its 1835 ornamental water well.

=== Casa Rosada ===
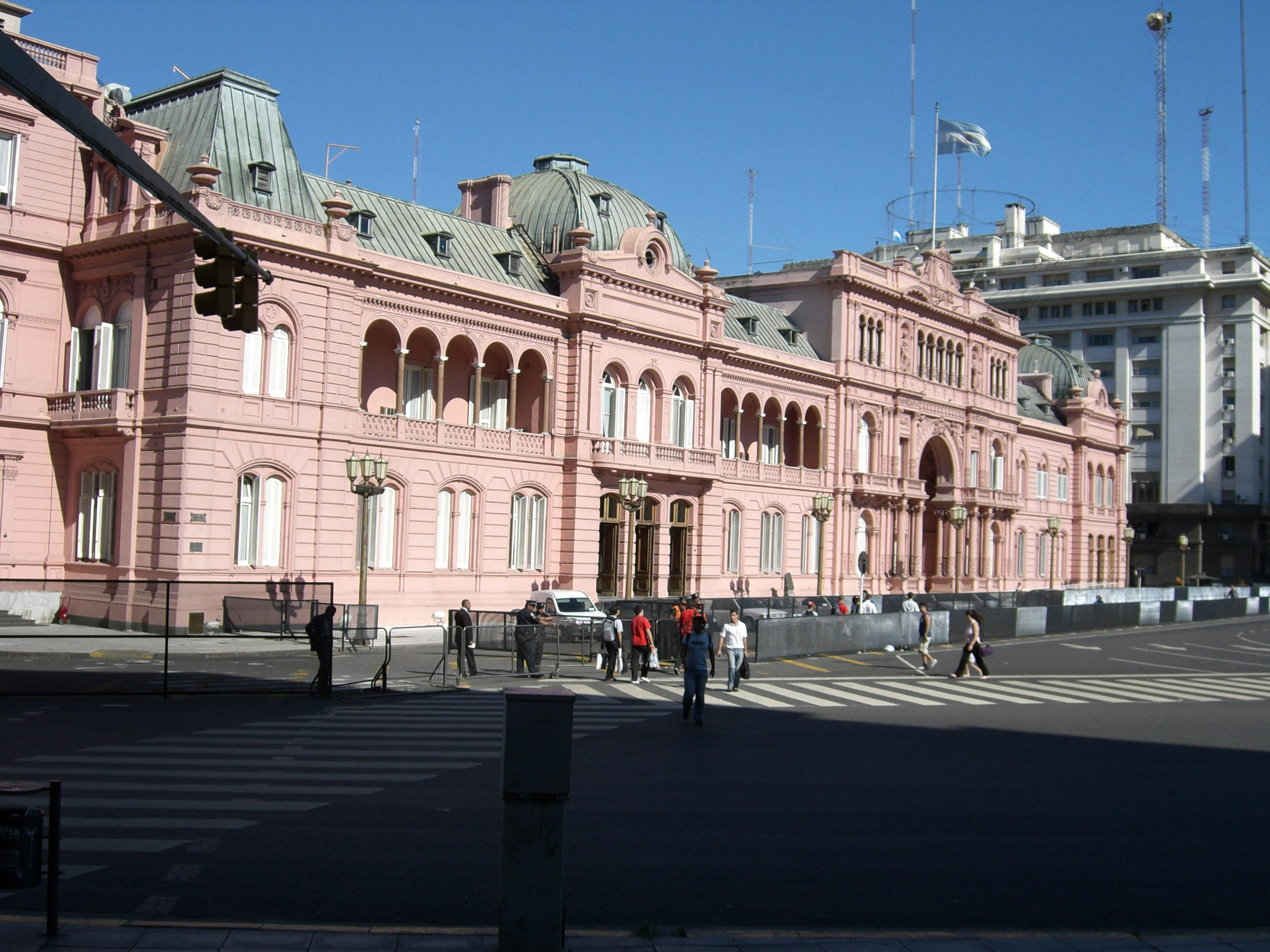
The Casa Rosada from the north

The Casa Rosada ("Pink House") is the official seat of the executive branch of the Argentine government.

The Casa Rosada sits at the eastern end of the Plaza de Mayo, a large square which since the 1580 foundation of Buenos Aires has been surrounded by many of the most important political institutions of the city and of Argentina. The site, originally at the waterline of the Río de la Plata, was first occupied by the "Fort of Juan Baltazar of Austria," a structure built on the orders of the founder of Buenos Aires, Captain Juan de Garay, in 1594. Its 1713 replacement by a masonry structure (the "Castle of San Miguel") complete with turrets made the spot the effective nerve center of colonial government.

Following independence, President Bernardino Rivadavia had a Neoclassical portico built at the entrance in 1825, and the building remained unchanged until, in 1857, President Justo José de Urquiza ordered the fort demolished in favor of a new customs building, built under the direction of British Argentine architect Edward Taylor. The Italianate structure was Buenos Aires' largest building from 1859 until the 1890s.

=== Metropolitan Cathedral ===
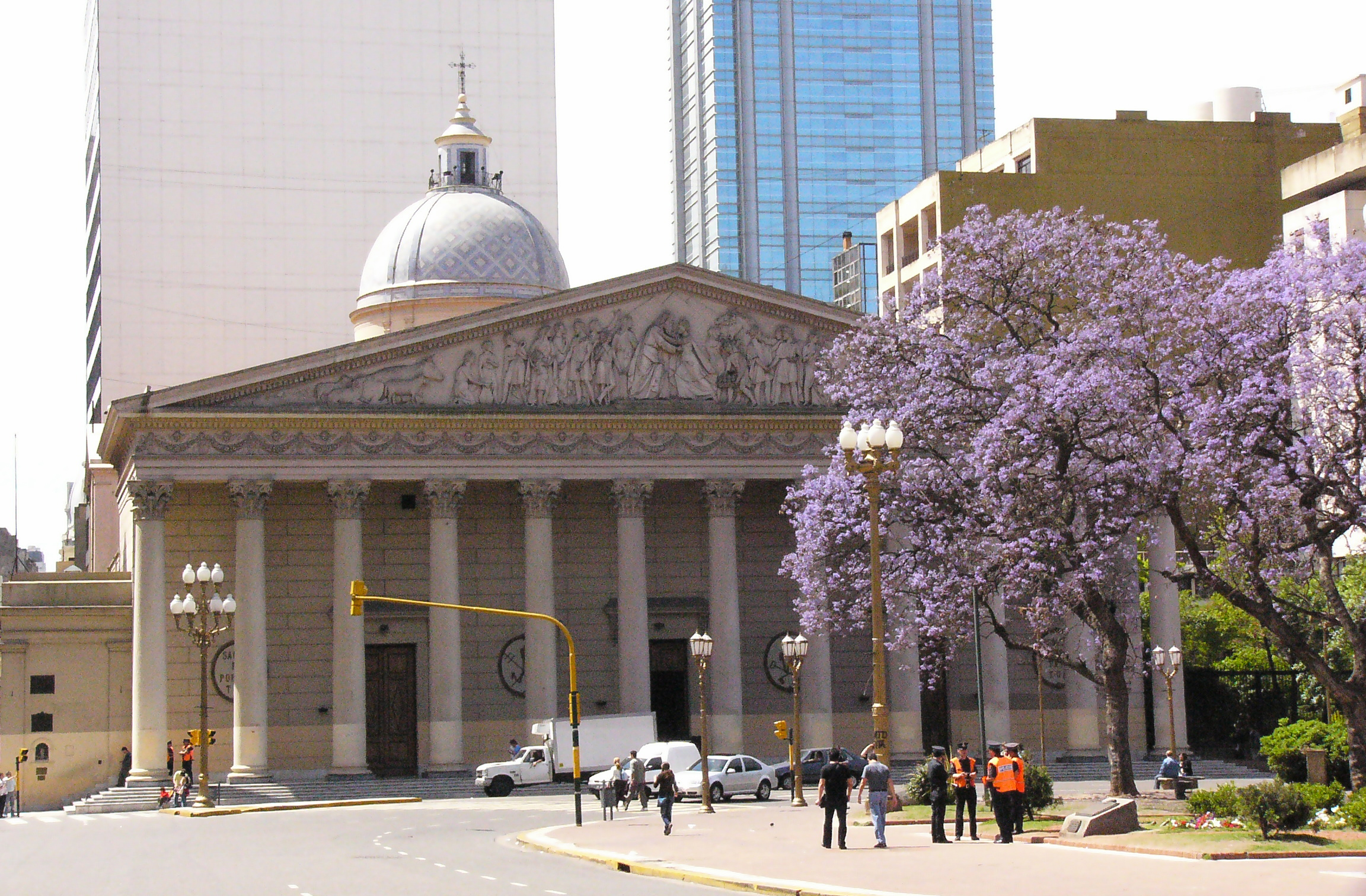
Main façade of the Cathedral.

The Metropolitan Cathedral (Spanish: Catedral Metropolitana de Buenos Aires) is the main Catholic church in Buenos Aires. It is located in the city centre, overlooking Plaza de Mayo, on the corner of San Martín and Rivadavia streets, in the San Nicolás neighbourhood. It is the mother church of the Archdiocese of Buenos Aires.

The Cathedral of Buenos Aires was rebuilt several times since its humble origins in the 16th century. The present building is a mix of architectural styles, with an 18th-century nave and dome and a severe, 19th century Neoclassical façade without towers. The interior keeps precious 18th century statues and altarpieces, as well as abundant Neo-Renaissance and Neo-Baroque decoration.

=== Museo de Arte Hispano Fernández Blanco ===
This museum of art is on Suipacha, in the Retiro neighborhood, in a large house built in the 1920s by architect Martín Noel in a neo-colonial style. The Buenos Aires town council bought the house in 1936, along with the art collection, which became the basis of the "Museo de Arte Colonial" that opened there a year later. In 1943, Isaac Fernández Blanco donated his collection to the museum, and in 1947 the museum was given its current name.

The legacy of the Fernández Blanco is considered one of the most important in Spanish American art, including silverware from Peru, and from de Río de la Plata; Peruvian and Cuzco paintings; Jesuit and Quito images, Brazilian furniture and decorative arts.

=== National Congress ===
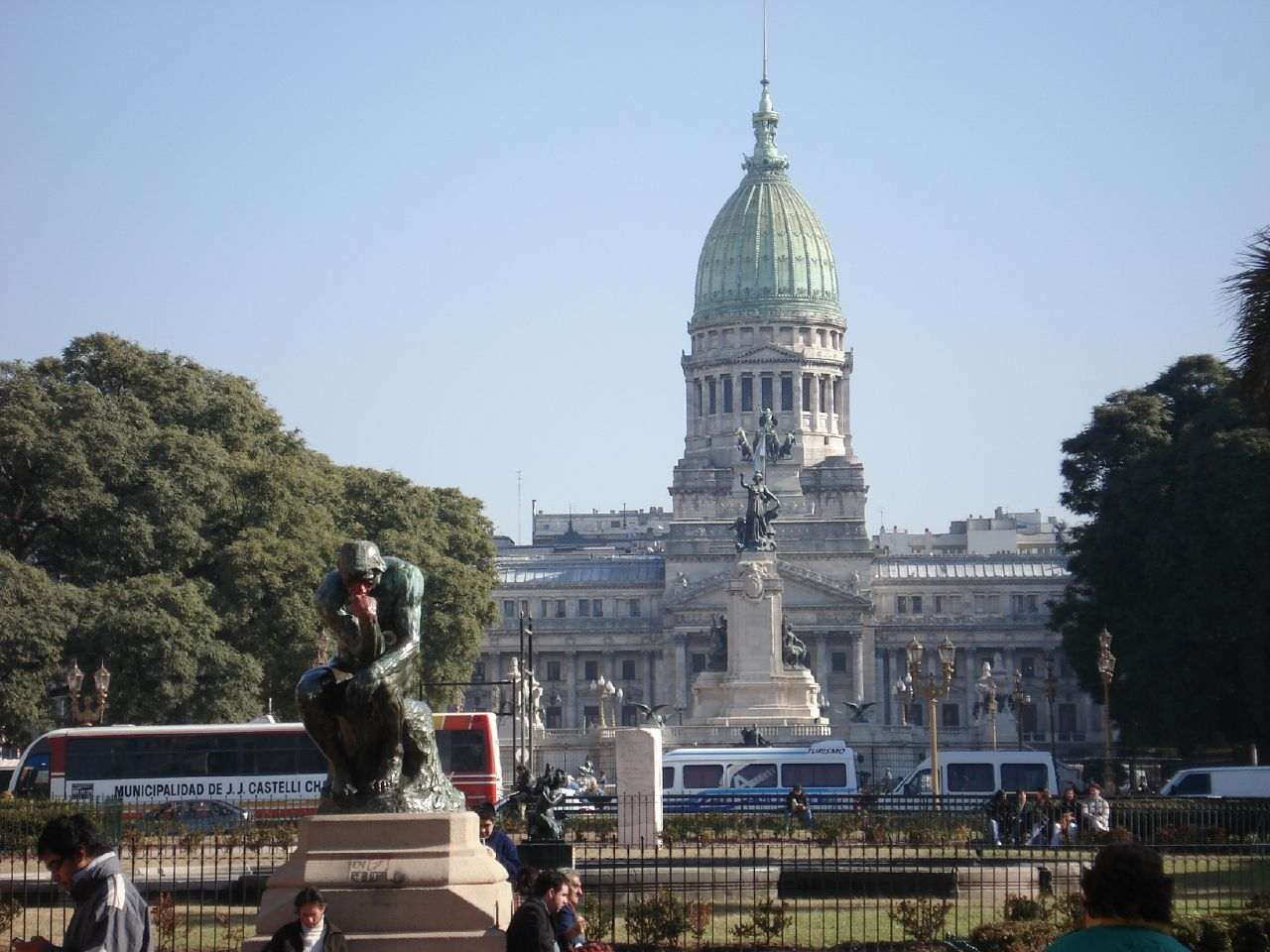
National Congress Building

The National Congress (Spanish: Congreso de la Nación Argentina) building is the seat of the legislative branch of the government of Argentina. It is situated at the end of Avenida de Mayo, at the other end of which is located the Casa Rosada. Designed by the Italian architect Vittorio Meano, the building was under construction between 1898 and 1906 when it was precariously opened, to be later finished by Julio Dormal. As time went by, the building proved too small for its purpose, and in 1974 the construction of the Edificio Anexo, which now holds the deputies' offices, was started.

In front of the building lies the Square of Congress (Spanish: Plaza del Congreso) which is popular with tourists, as well as a preferred location for protestors and those who want to voice their opinion about Congress activities.

=== National Library ===
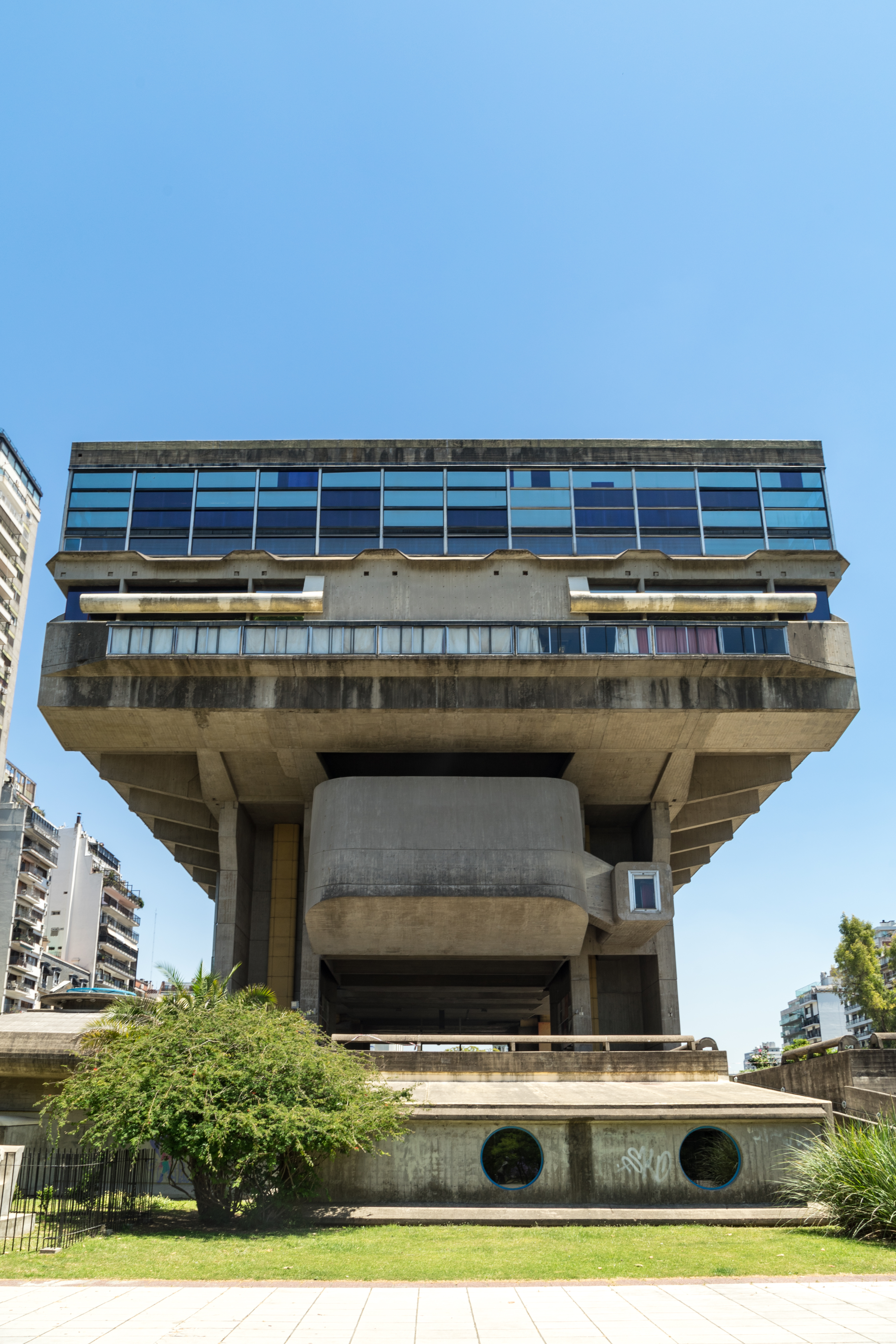
The National Library, designed in 1961 by Clorindo Testa, Francisco Bullrich and Alicia Cazzaniga.

The National Library (Spanish: Biblioteca Nacional de la República Argentina) is the largest library in Argentina and one of the most important in the Americas. It is located in the barrio of Recoleta and viewed as an example of brutalist architecture.

Originally named the Public Library of Buenos Aires and founded in September 1810 by decree of the first Government Junta of the May Revolution first Government Junta, it later became the country's only national library when it redefined its mission in 1884 and formally changed its name to the National Library of Argentina. The first headquarters, an old 18th century mansion that belonged to the Jesuits, was located on the corner of Moreno Street and Peru Street at the Manzana de Las Luces.

=== San Martín Palace ===
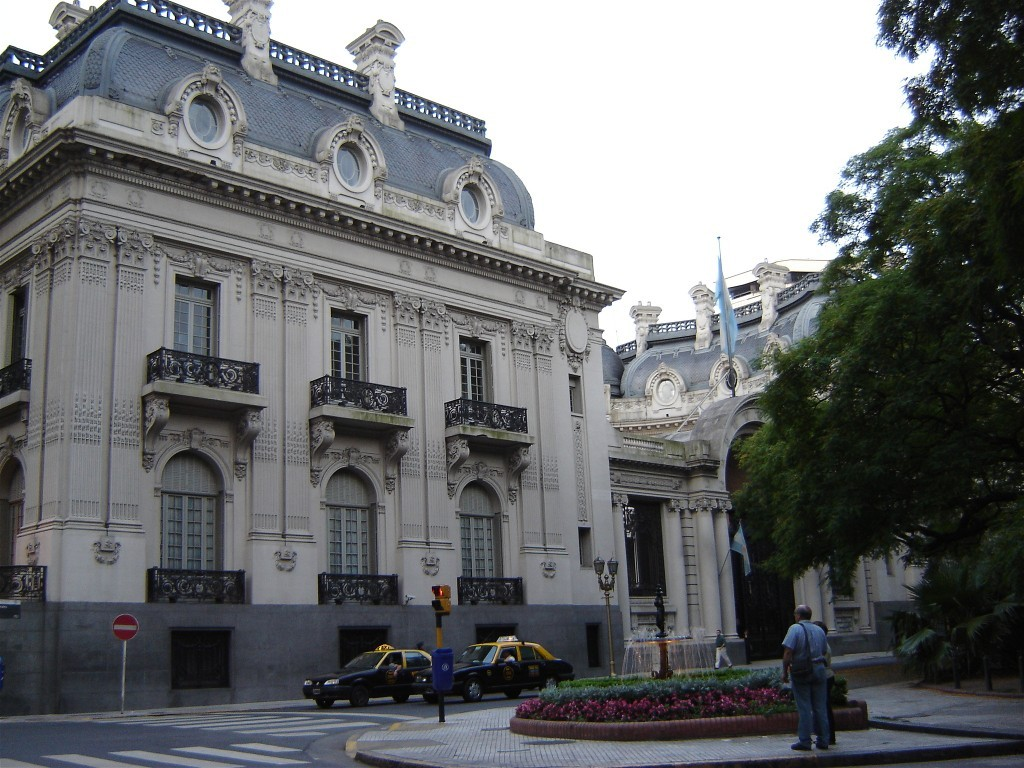
San Martín Palace

San Martín Palace (Spanish: Palacio San Martín) is located in Plaza San Martín in the heart of Buenos Aires]. Formerly Anchorena Palace, the building was acquired by the Argentine government in 1936 and became the Headquarters for the Ministry of Foreign Relations. At present it serves as the Ceremonial Headquarters for the Ministry.

The palace contains many works of art by Argentine and American artists from the 20th century, such as Antonio Berni, Pablo Curatela Manes, Lino Enea Spilimbergo, and Roberto Matta.

== Other Buildings ==
=== Club de Pescadores ===
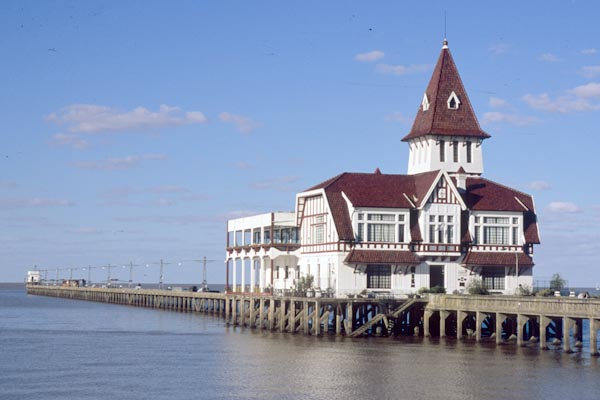
Club de Pescadores, Buenos Aires, Argentina.

The Club de Pescadores ("Fisherman's Club") is situated on the banks of the Río de la Plata in Costanera Norte Avenue.

In 1926 a plan was initiated to construct a pier with a building on it to house the social activities of the club. This received presidential consent in 1928 and construction of the pier was completed in 1930. The building on the pier, still in existence today, was designed by José N. Quartino and officially opened on 16 January 1937 in the presence the Argentina president General Agustín P. Justo.

Declared a national historic monument in 2001, the building has become an icon of the city of Buenos Aires.

=== Confitería El Molino ===
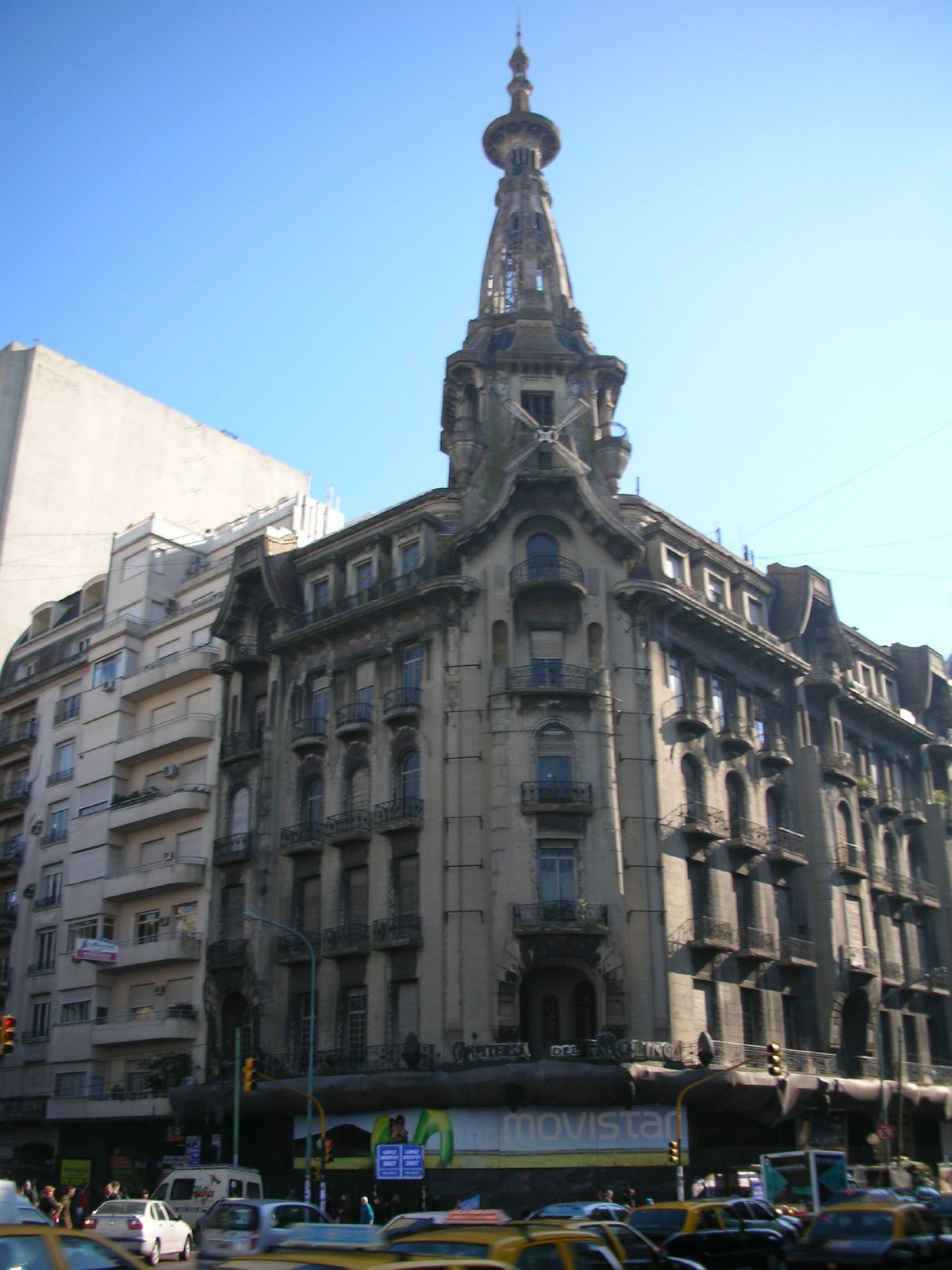
Old El Molino Coffeehouse

The Confitería El Molino is an Art Nouveau style coffeehouse located on the corner of Callao Av. and Rivadavia Av., in front of the Argentine National Congress.

In 1915 Cayetano Brenna, a famous confectioner, commissioned the Italian architect Francisco Gianotti, to design the building that would house the café on its ground floor. When finished in 1917 the building, which was on the site of an existing café, was one of the highest buildings in the city with a corner turret which was illuminated from the inside with electric light, stained glass windows and windmill sails. El Molino and Galería Güemes were two of Gianotti's greatest works and represent important examples of Art Nouveau style architecture in Buenos Aires. Over the years El Molino became a favourite meeting place for the rich and famous. The café closed on February 23, 1997 and today is only rarely opened to the public for events designed to advertise the urgent need to restore the building before its final disintegration.

In 1997 El Molino was declared a National Historic Monument.

=== Galerías Pacífico ===
The Galerías Pacífico is a shopping mall located on Florida Street, at the junction with Córdoba Avenue. The Beaux Arts building was designed by the architects Emilio Agrelo and Roland Le Vacher in 1889 to accommodate a shop called the Argentine Bon Marché, modelled on the Le Bon Marché in Paris.

In 1945 the building was remodelled by architects José Aslan and Héctor Ezcurra, and the offices were separated from the rest of the building. A large central cupola was constructed and decorated with 12 frescos by artists Lino Enea Spilimbergo, Antonio Berni, Juan Carlos Castagnino, Manuel Colmeiro and Demetrio Urruchúa. These frescos, executed in 1946, are some of the most important in Buenos Aires.

After having been abandoned for years, the building was renovated by Juan Carlos López and Associates and re-opened in 1990 as the shopping arcade Galerías Pacífico. Four more frescos by Romulo Maccio, Josefina Robirosa, Guillermo Roux and Carlos Alonso were added to the cupola. In addition to the shopping arcade the building also contains the Jorge Luis Borges Cultural Centre and the Julio Bocca Dance Studio.

=== Kavanagh Building ===
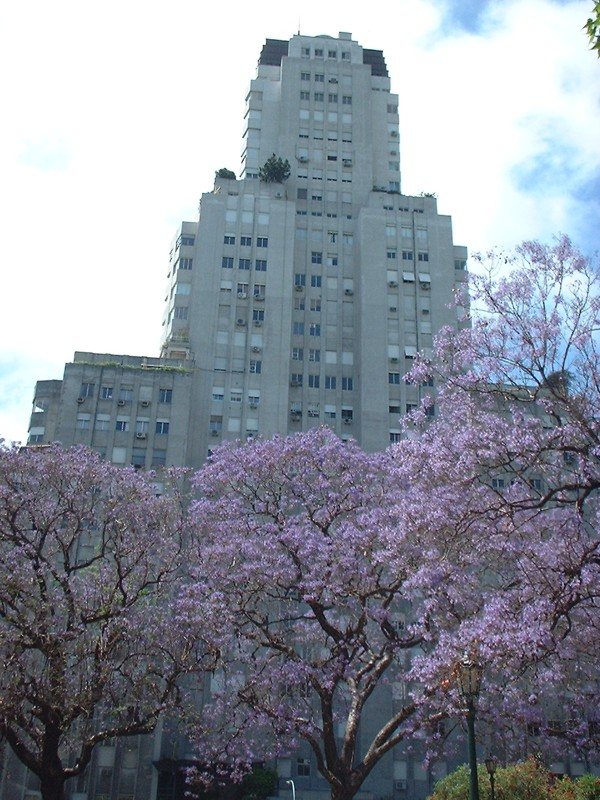
Kavanagh Building through San Martín Square's jacarandás

The Kavanagh Building (Spanish: Edificio Kavanagh) is located at 1065 Florida St. in the barrio of Retiro, overlooking Plaza San Martín. It was constructed in the 1930s in the Rationalist style, by the architects Gregorio Sánchez, Ernesto Lagos and Luis María de la Torre and was finished in 1936. The building is characterised by the austerity of its lines, the lack of external ornamentation and its large prismatic volumes. It was declared a national historical monument in 1999, and is one of the most impressive architectural masterpieces of Buenos Aires. Standing at a height of 120 m, it still retains its impact against the modern skyline of the city. In 1939 its façade received an award from the American Institute of Architects.

=== Palacio Barolo ===
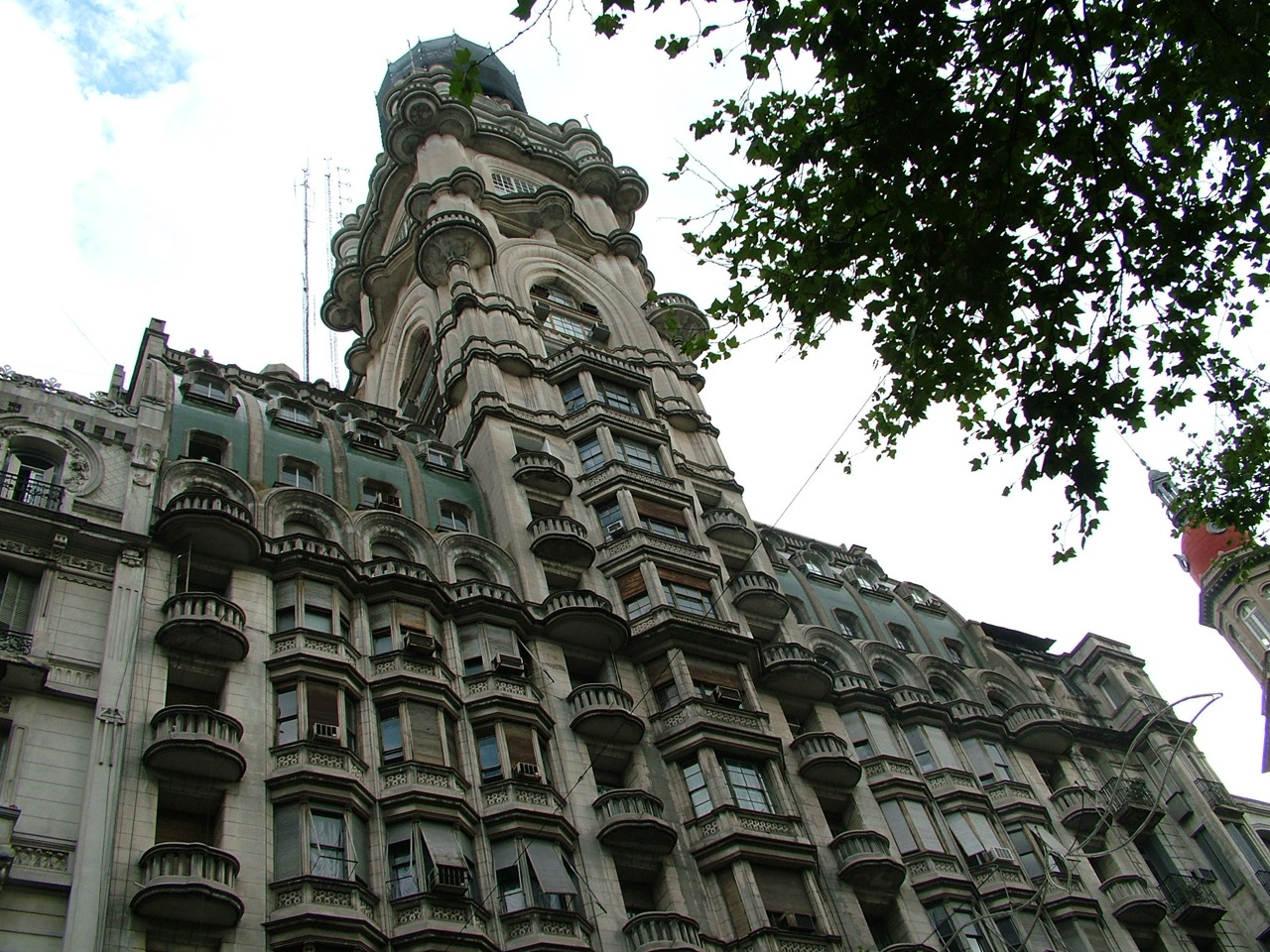
Palacio Barolo

Palacio Barolo is a 22-story office building located at 1370 Avenida de Mayo. The Italian architect Mario Palanti was commissioned to design the building by the empresario Luis Barolo, an Italian immigrant who had arrived in Argentina in 1890 and had made a fortune in knitted fabrics. The basic design, in Eclectic style, was conceived simultaneously with one for the Palacio Salvo in Montevideo, Uruguay. The Palacio Barolo was designed in accordance with the cosmology of Dante's Divine Comedy, motivated by the architect's admiration for Alighieri.

When completed in 1923 it was the tallest building, not only in the city, but also in the whole of South America. It remained the city's tallest building until 1935 when, on completion, the Kavanagh Building took over this title. The lighthouse at the top of the building can be seen all the way in Montevideo, Uruguay.

=== Teatro Colón ===
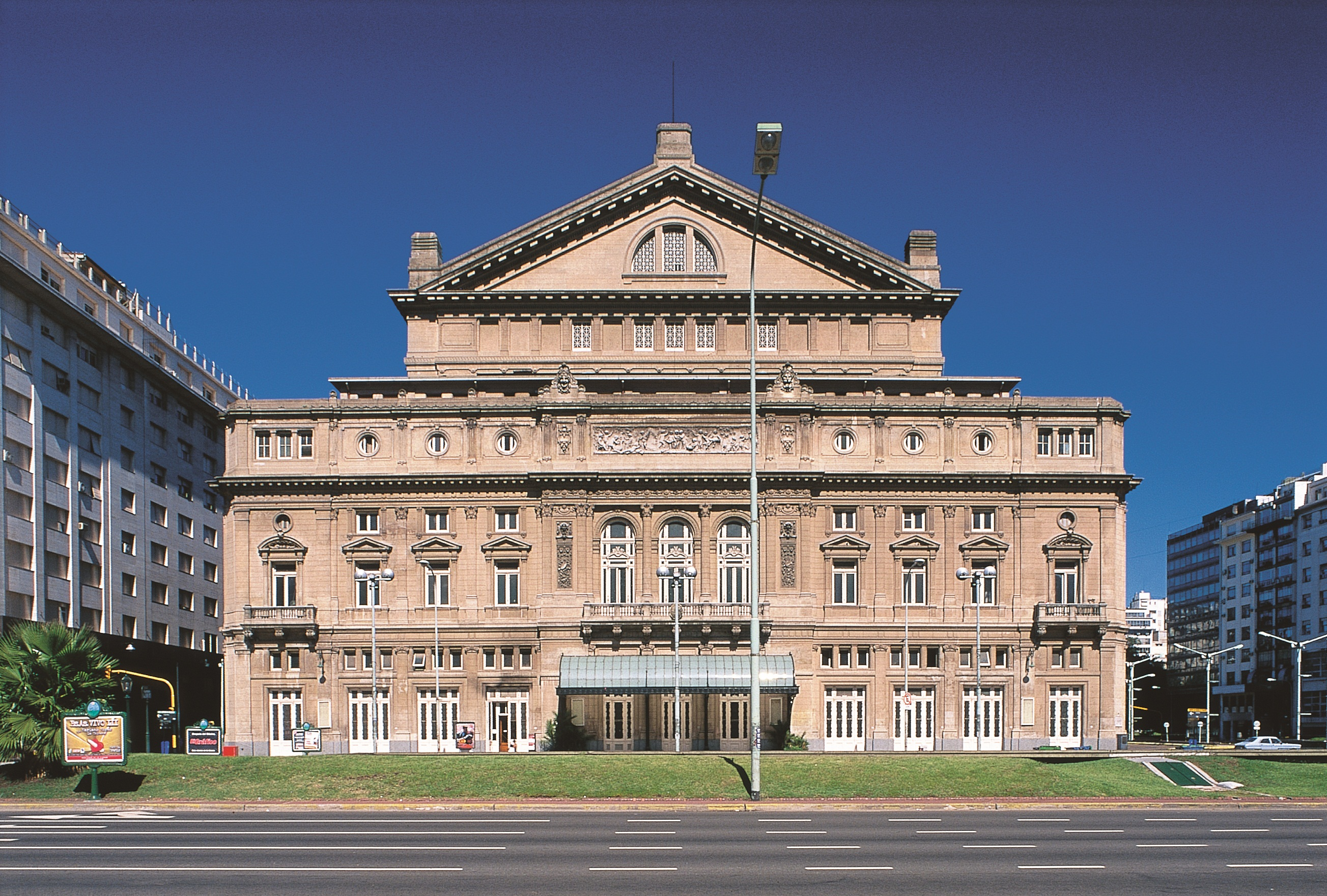
Teatro Colón

The Teatro Colón (Columbus Theatre) opened in 1908 and is one of the World's major opera houses.

The present theatre, the second with that name, opened in 1908 after twenty years under construction. The auditorium is horseshoe-shaped, has 2,487 seats (slightly more than, say, the Royal Opera House in Covent Garden, London, England), standing room for 1,000 and a stage which is 20 m wide, 15 m high and 20 m deep. The acoustics are considered one of the best five acoustics in opera in the world.

The theatre is bounded by the extremely wide 9 de Julio Avenue (technically Cerrito Street), Libertad Street (the main entrance), Arturo Toscanini Street, and Tucumán Street. It is in the heart of the city on a site once occupied by Ferrocarril Oeste's Plaza Parque station.

== See also ==
- List of National Historic Monuments of Argentina

== External sources ==
- "MONUMENTOS HISTORICOS DE CAPITAL FEDERAL" Intertournet
- CATALOGO DE MONUMENTOS Comisión Nacional de Museos y de Monumentos y Lugares Históricos
- "MUST-SEE PLACES" Government of Argentina
