= Lola Mora =

Argentine sculptor (1866–1936)

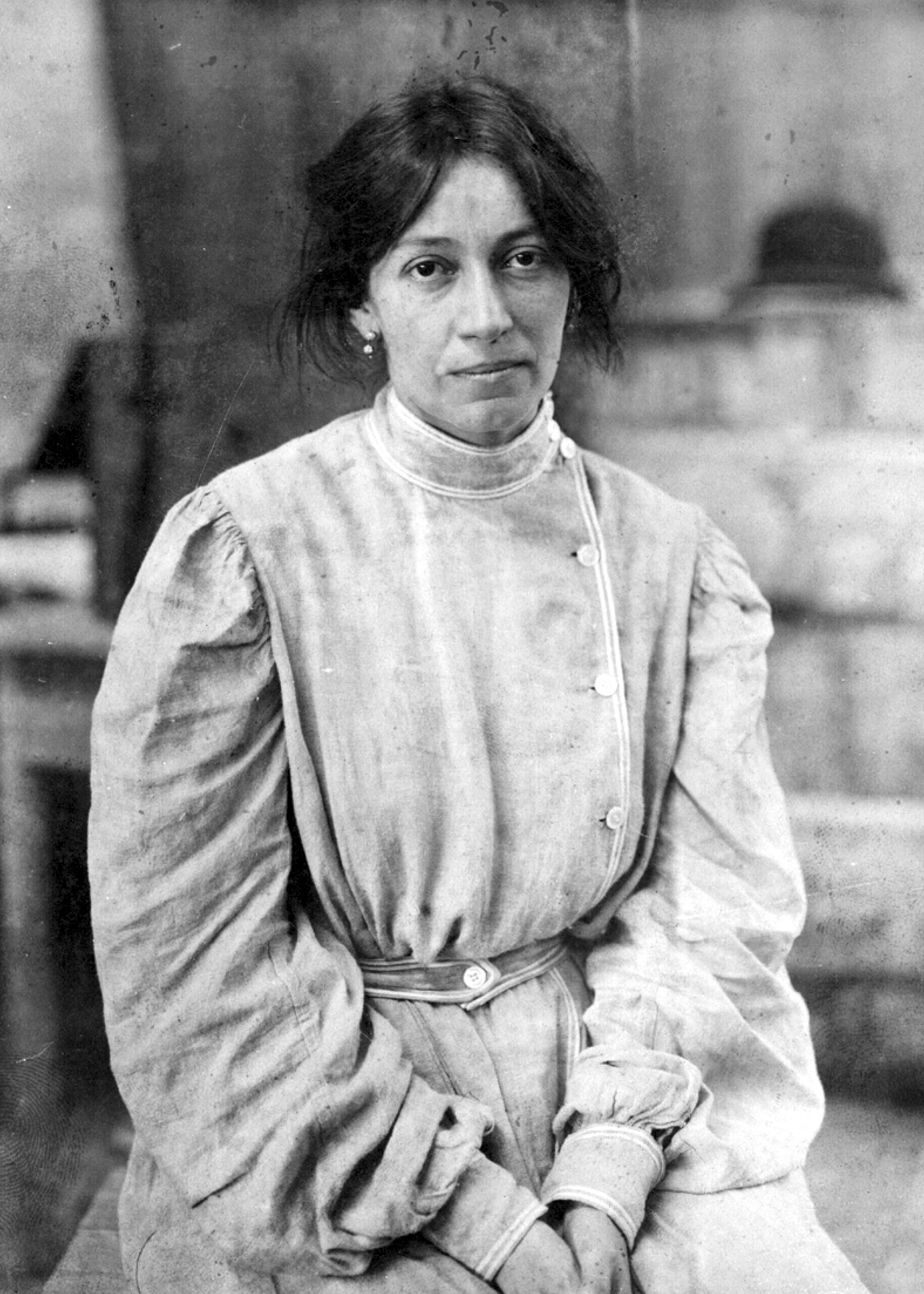
- Mora in 1903
- Born: Dolores Candelaria Mora Vega; 17 November 1866; San Miguel de Tucumán, Tucumán, Argentina
- Died: 7 June 1936 (aged 69); Buenos Aires, Argentina
- Resting place: La Chacarita Cemetery
- Education: Giulio Monteverde
- Known for: Sculpture
- Notable work: Las Nereidas
- Movement: Classicism

Dolores Candelaria Mora Vega (17 November 1866 – 7 June 1936), known professionally as Lola Mora, was an Argentine sculptor. She is known today as a cultural rebel and a pioneer of women in her artistic field.

== Early life ==
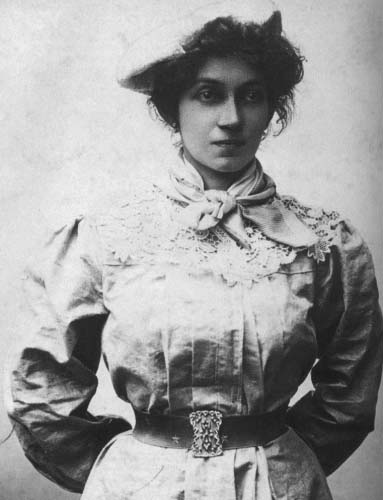
Mora in the 1890s

Dolores was the daughter of Romualdo Alejandro Mora, a prosperous landowner of Tucumán Province of Spanish origin and Regina Vega. She was the third born of seven children, three boys and four girls. Her parents decided that the girls should also have the best education possible (unusual behaviour for the time). In 1870, her parents moved the family to San Miguel del Tucumán when Lola was four years old. At seven years of age, she was a boarding school pupil at Colegio Sarmiento de Tucumán Province. In 1885, both her parents died within two days. Her older sister, Paula Mora Vega, married the engineer Guillermo Rucker, and together they took care of the orphans.

== Education ==
At 20 years of age, she began painting portraits, but soon turned to sculpting marble and granite. She studied art in her home province and then, with a scholarship, in Rome, Italy, studying under Costantino Barbella and Giulio Monteverde. In 1900 she returned to Argentina and, with government connections, was commissioned to create two bas-reliefs for the Historical House of Tucumán.

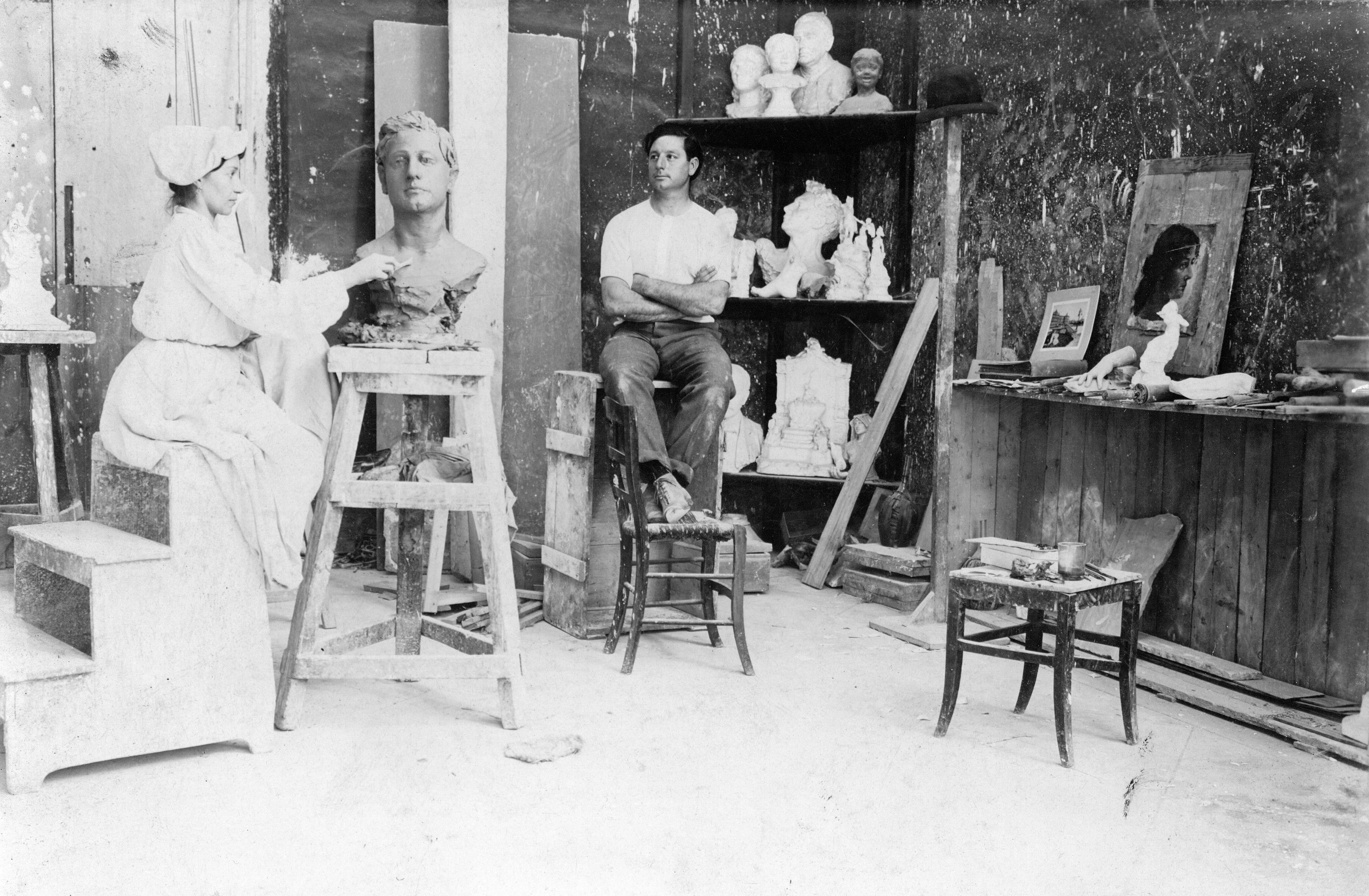
Mora working at her studio in 1903

As her career developed, her sensual style and her status as a female artist made her controversial. In 1903, her Nereids Fountain, created for the city of Buenos Aires, met bureaucratic problems at the city's Deliberative Council, which had the sculpture moved around from place to place.

Near the end of her life, she entered into some extravagant business (such as financing petroleum surveys in Salta), and then retired with only a pension to support herself. After her death in Buenos Aires, in poverty and obscurity, her friends burned her letters, mementoes, and personal diaries.

Mora obtained various patents. One included a system to project films without a screen (using a column of vapour), as well as systems for mining.

Mora was the subject of the 1996 film Lola Mora (film), directed by Argentine director Javier Torre.

== Works ==
Mora's works include (in Buenos Aires unless otherwise noted):

- two bas-reliefs at the House of Tucumán, with the themes of the May Revolution's First National Government and the Declaration of Independence, 1900
- the Nereids Fountain, now located at Puerto Madero, 1903
- two major sculptural groups flanking the entrance, and other interior and exterior work, Palace of the Argentine National Congress, inaugurated 1906 (four allegorical sculptures of Peace, Justice, Liberty and Progress were moved to the grounds of the Government House of San Salvador de Jujuy)
- several sculpture groups placed along the "Oath Passage" in the historic centre of Rosario, leading to the National Flag Memorial
- female figure for the crypt of Ramón López Lecube, La Recoleta Cemetery, circa 1912
- Avellaneda Memorial, Plaza Alsina, Avellaneda, 1913
- Liberty, Independence Square, San Miguel de Tucumán
- Monument to Francisco Narciso de Laprida, San José de Jáchal
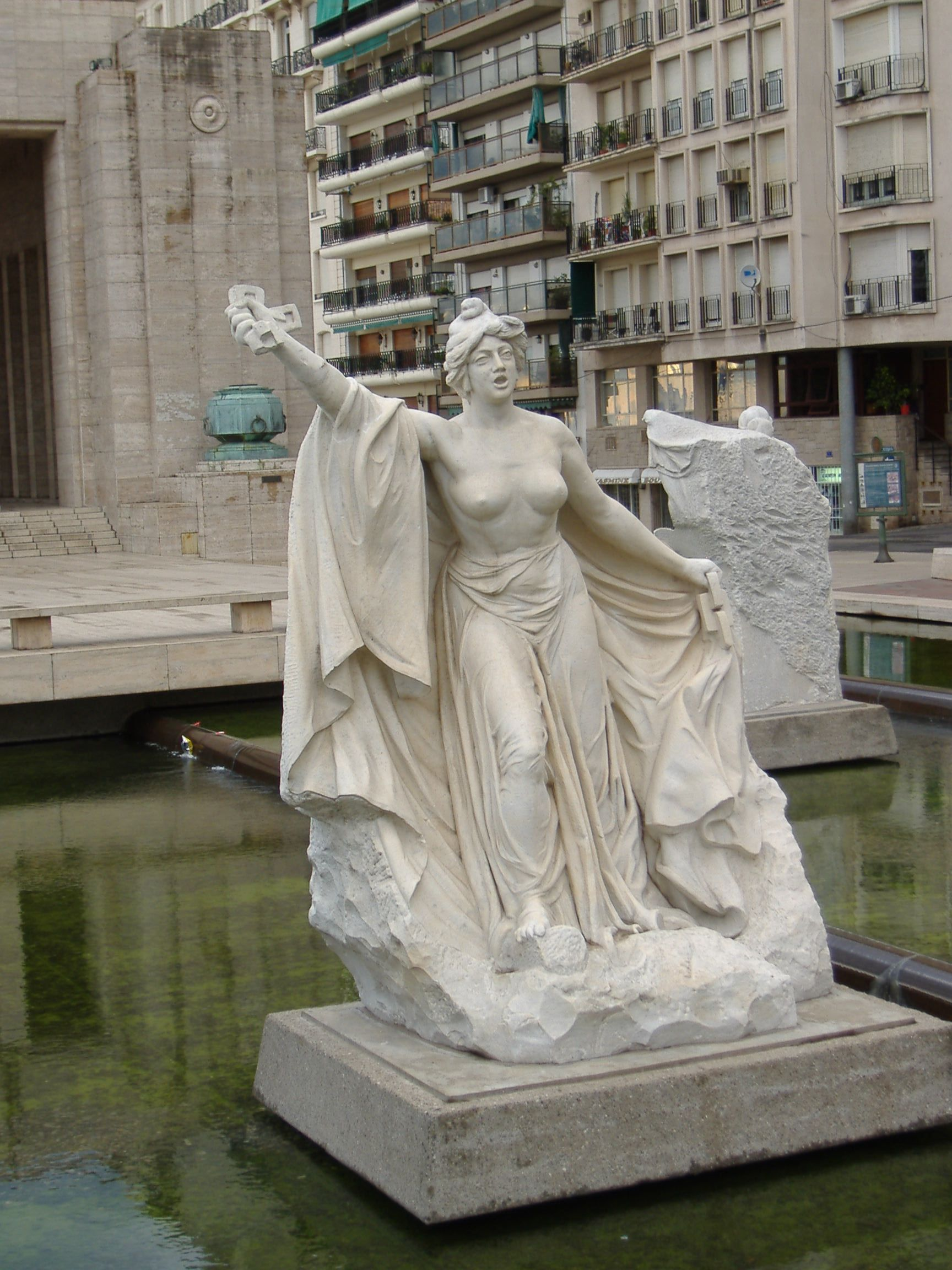
Monument to Liberty along the Monument to the Flag in Rosario

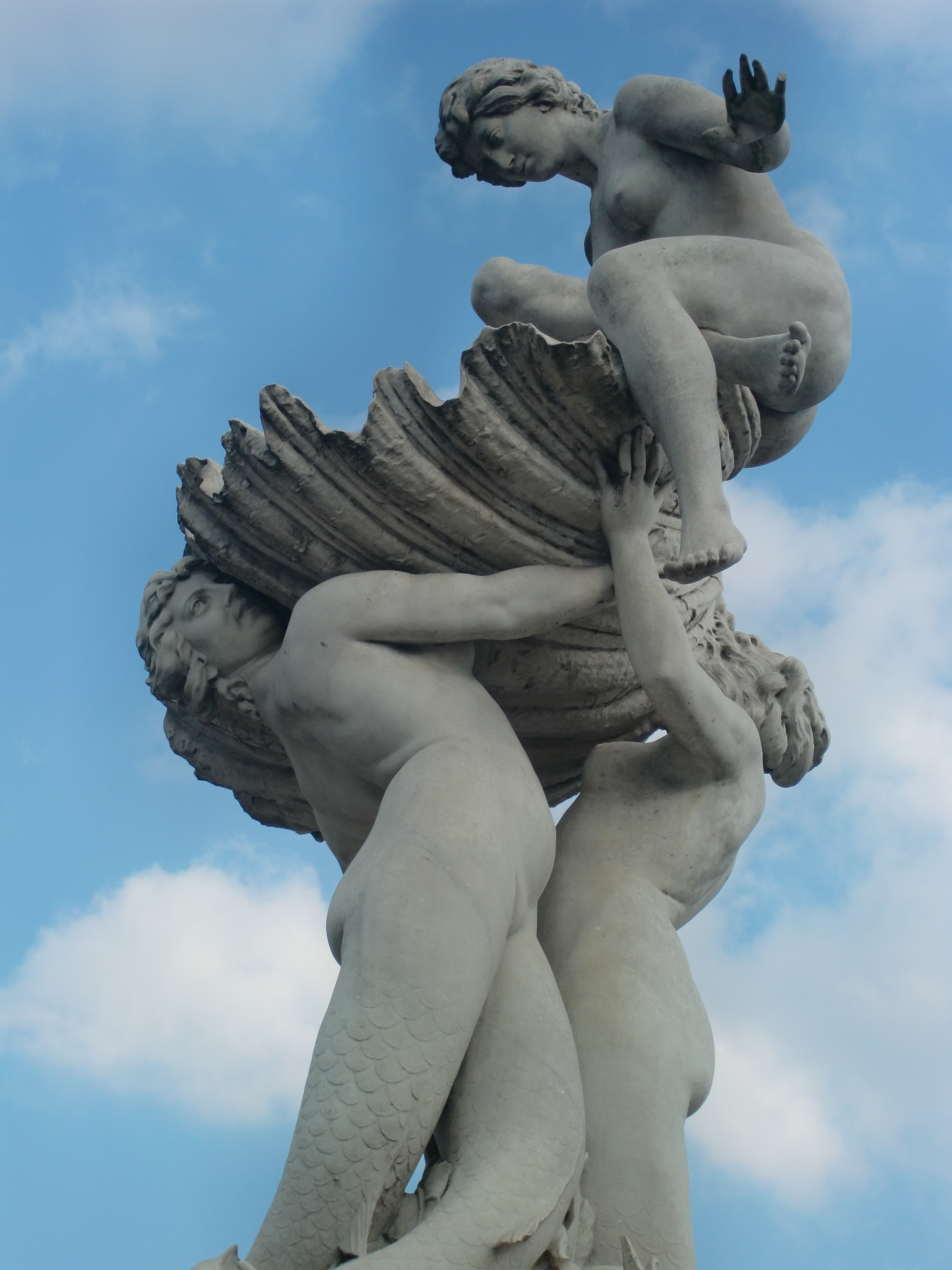
The Nereids Fountain, Buenos Aires

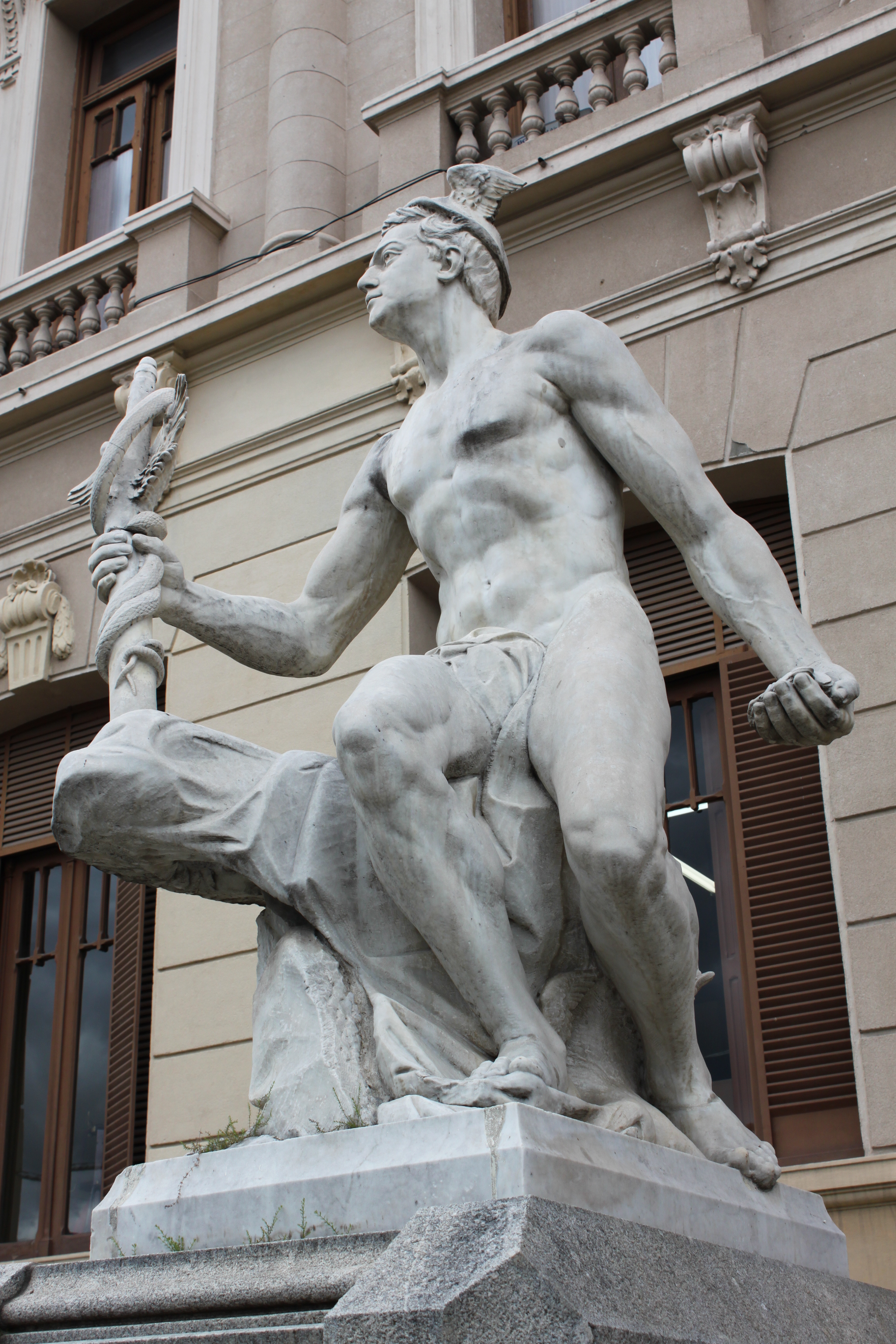
Progress

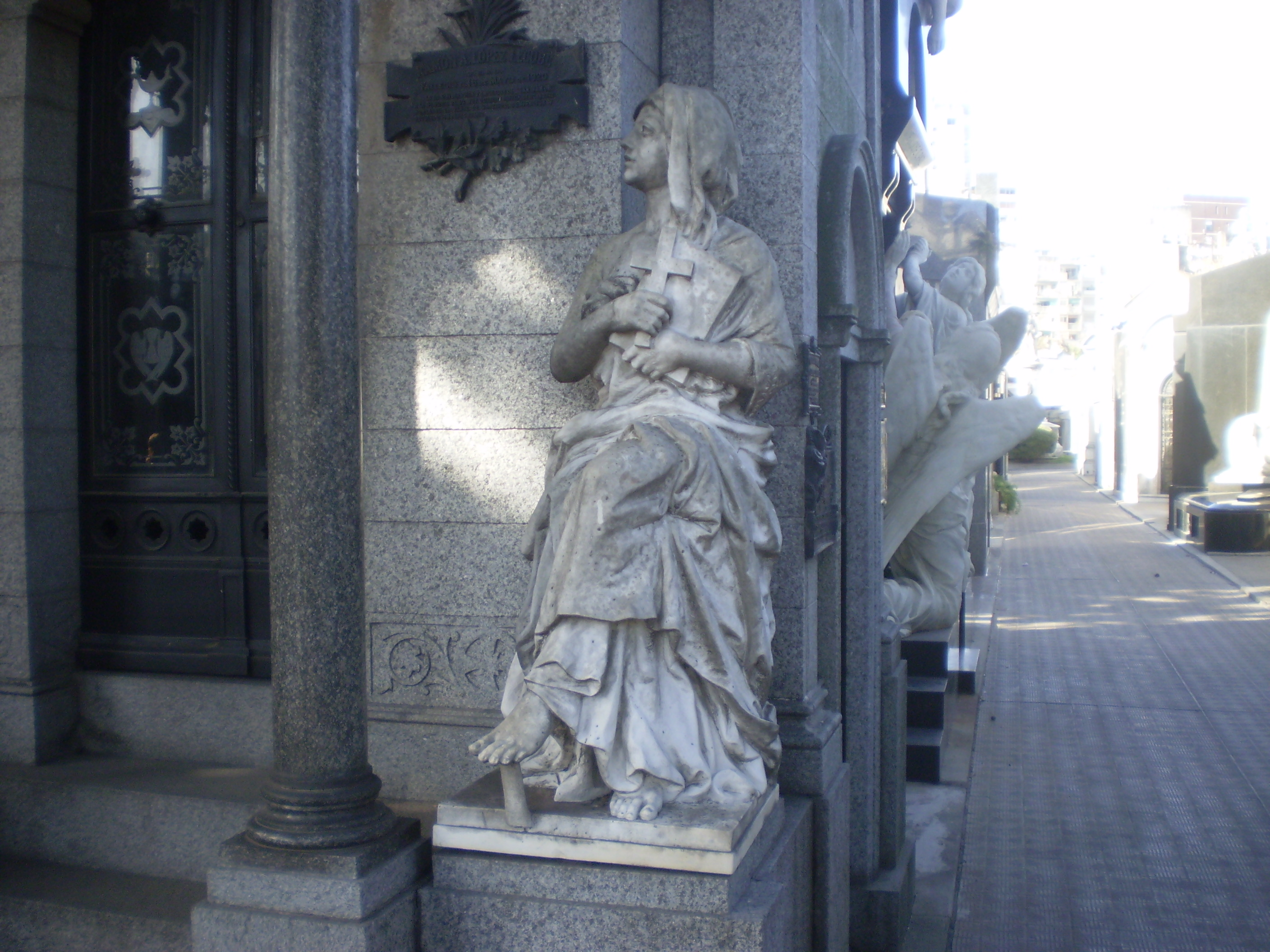
Grave in La Recoleta Cemetery

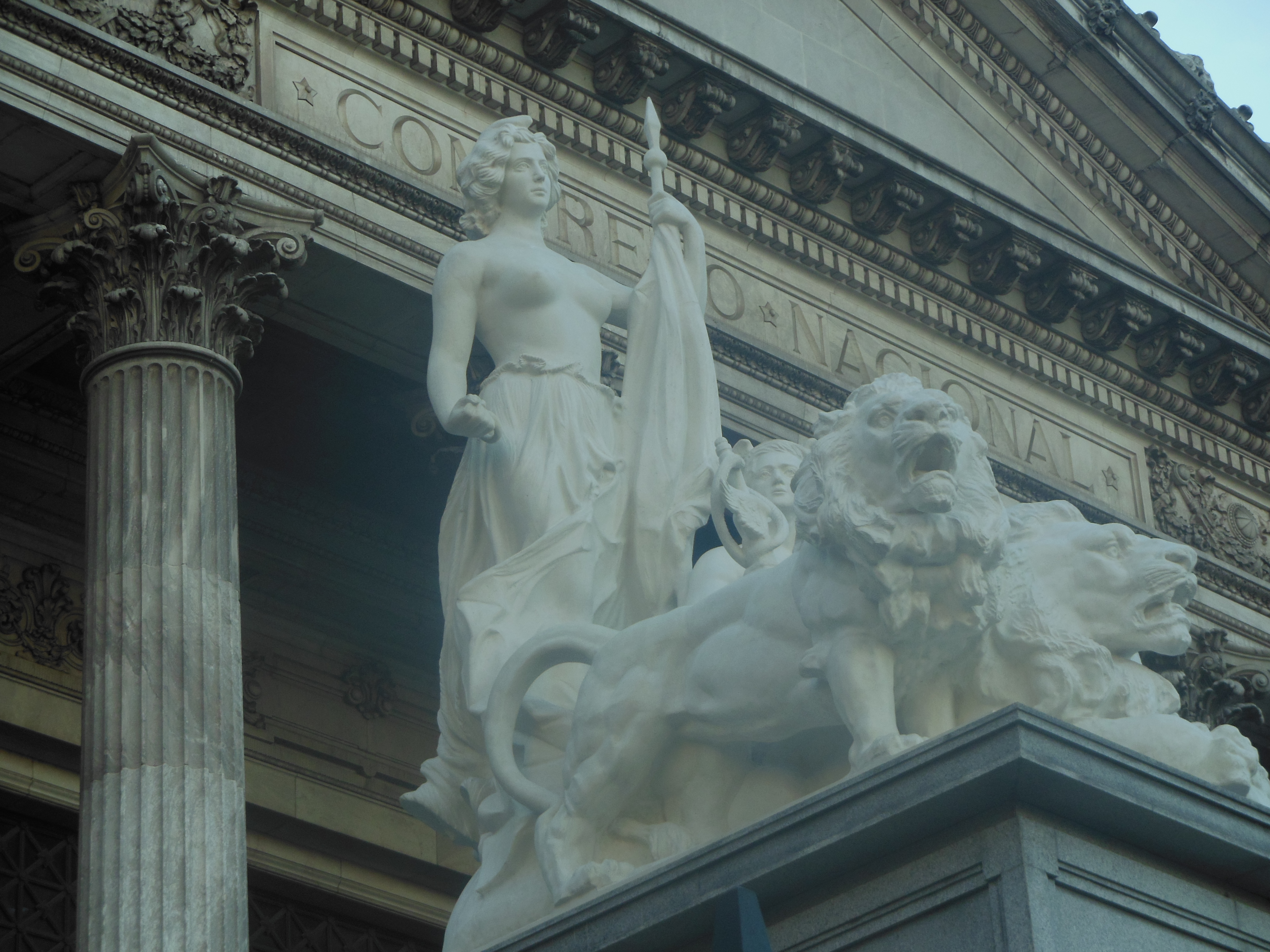
Statues in the National Congress

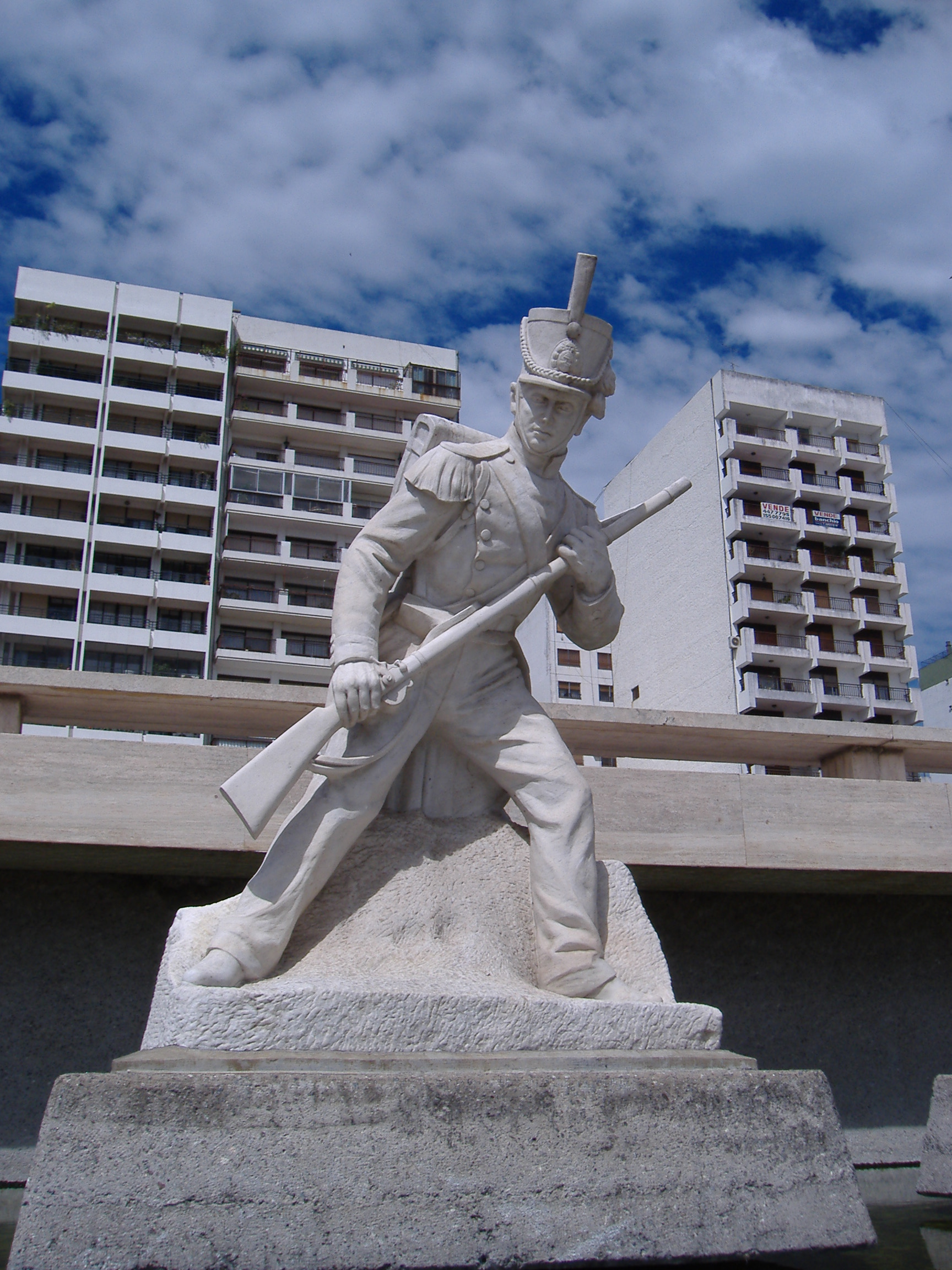
Grenadier (Argentine Army)

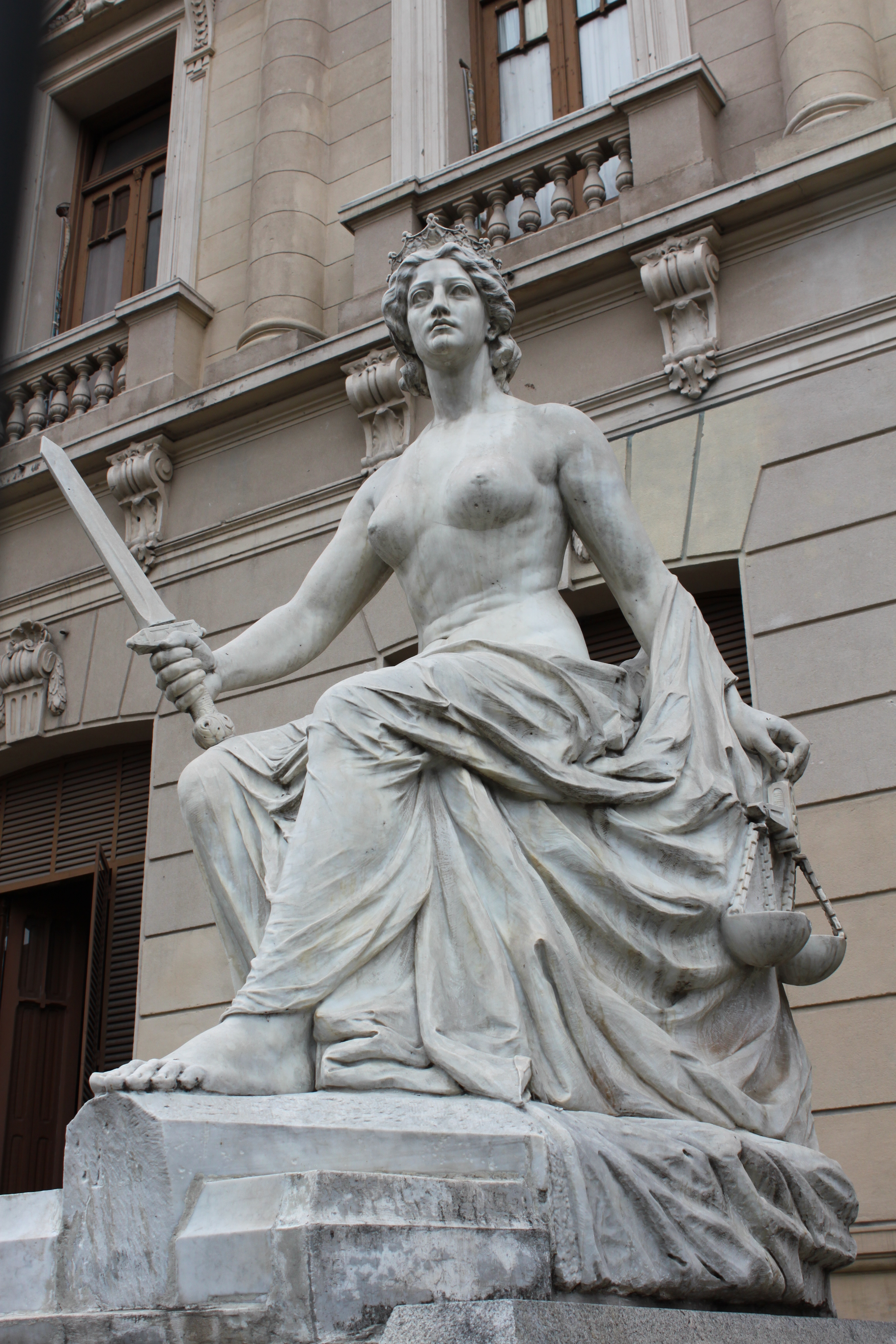
Lady Justice
