= Legislative Palace of Uruguay =

Coordinates: 34.89107°S 56.18726°W

- Palacio Legislativo del Uruguay
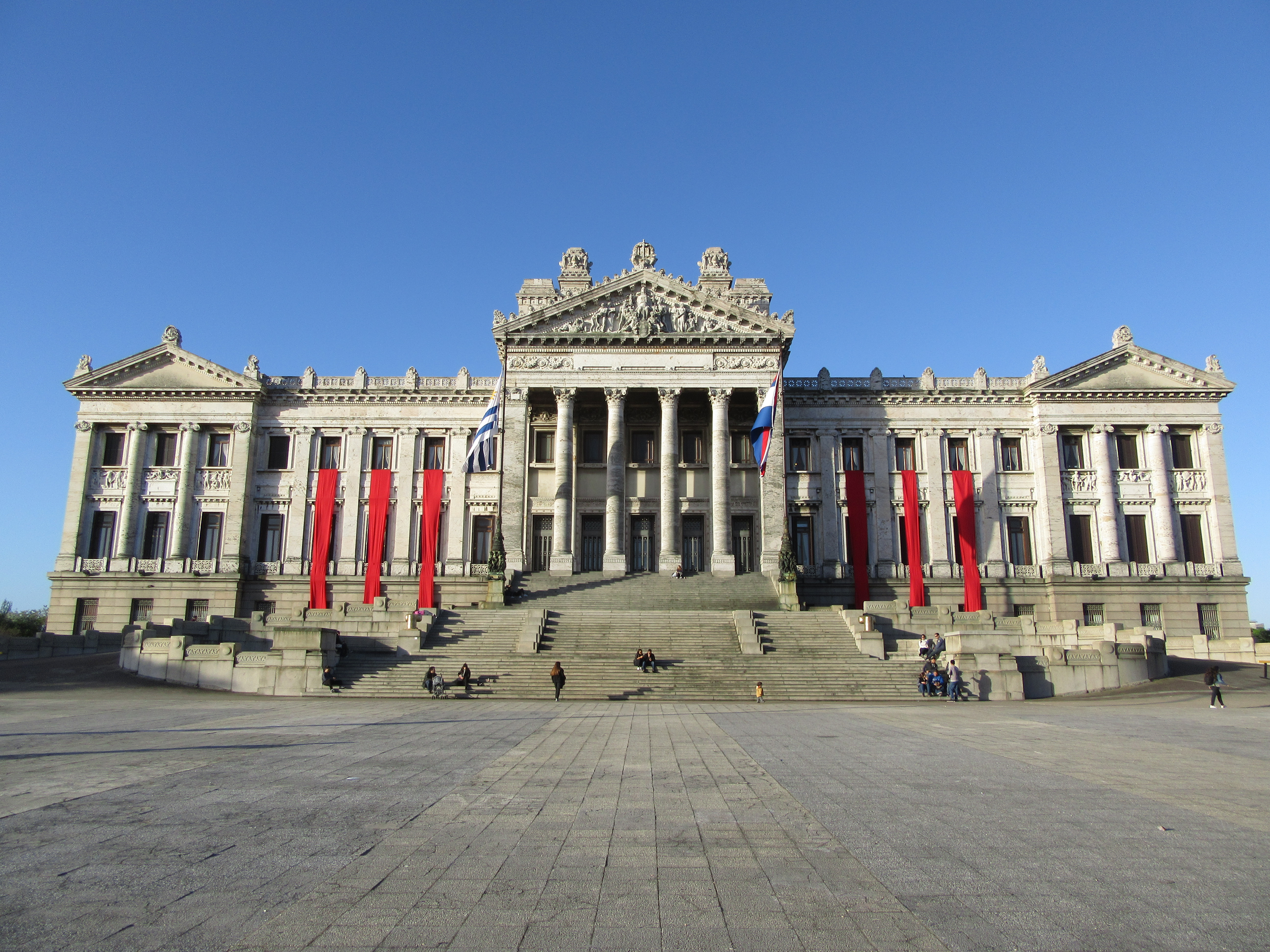
- Interactive map of the Legislative Palace of Uruguay area

General information
- Architectural style: Neoclassical
- Location: Montevideo, Uruguay
- Construction started: 1904
- Completed: 1925; 101 years ago
- Owner: General Assembly of Uruguay

Design and construction
- Architects: Vittorio Meano; Gaetano Moretti
- Main contractor: G. y M. Debernardis

The Legislative Palace of Uruguay (Spanish: Palacio Legislativo del Uruguay) is a monumental building, meeting place of the General Assembly of Uruguay, and the seat of the legislative branch of the Uruguayan government. It is located in the Aguada neighborhood of Montevideo.

Constructed between 1904 and 1925, the building was inaugurated on August 25, 1925, in commemoration of the centenary of the Declaration of Independence. It was declared a National Historic Monument in 1975 by the government of President Juan María Bordaberry.

== History ==
In 1902, a law was made that approved the call for international competition for architectural projects for the construction of a new headquarters for the legislative branch, since its old headquarters, the Montevideo Cabildo, had several inadequacies. The project of the architect Vittorio Meano, who at that time was building the Palace of the Argentine National Congress in Buenos Aires, was approved. He never found out that his project had been the winner since he died suddenly before he could be contacted by the Legislative Palace Commission, organizer of the project competition.

The construction of this building started in 1904, sponsored by the government of President José Batlle y Ordoñez. It was designed by Italian architects Vittorio Meano and Gaetano Moretti, who planned the building's interior that is covered with marble. Among the notable contributors to the project was sculptor José Belloni, who created numerous reliefs and allegorical sculptures for the building. On August 25, 1925, the palace was formally inaugurated. Although the decoration work was not completed until 1964. The inauguration was presided over by President José Serrato.

== Architecture ==
The palace is a Greco-Roman eclecticist-styled building whose facades, interior walls, vaults and columns are covered with different marbles from Uruguay. It took almost three decades to build. It consists of three large halls and several adjoining rooms, an upper floor where the Library of the Legislative Power works with more than 250,000 volumes and some parliamentary offices, as well as a large basement where there are offices, warehouses and printing and binding workshops. The main facade of the building is aligned with the axis of symmetry of Libertador Avenue.

=== Interior ===
==== Lobby of Honor ====
The Honorary Lobby is the first room after the main entrance of the building. It connects the portico with the Hall of the Lost Steps, and it exhibits works of art such as "La Jura de la Constitución 1830" by Pedro Blanes Viale, and the "Encuentro de un Centauro Indio con el León Hispano" and "El primer surco", both by Manuel Rosé.

==== Hall of the Lost Steps ====
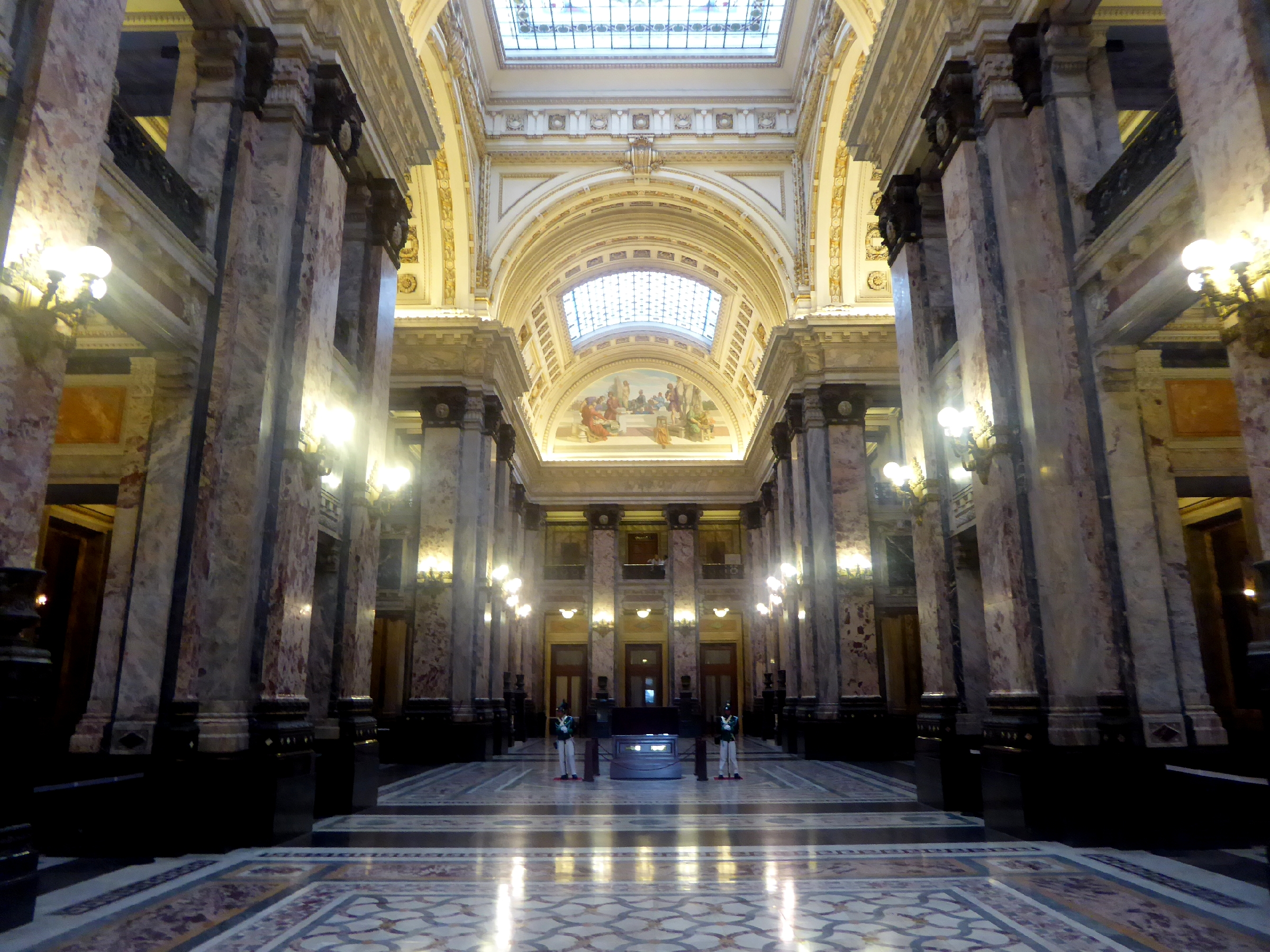
Hall of the Lost Steps

In the nave of the building is the Hall of the Lost Steps (Spanish: Salón de los Pasos Perdidos), which is inspired by the cathedrals of the Renaissance and is composed of two vaults and a central skylight, which separates the two chambers in which the Senate and the House of Representatives meet. The entrance to each of the chambers is crowned with three stained glass windows that form a semicircle.

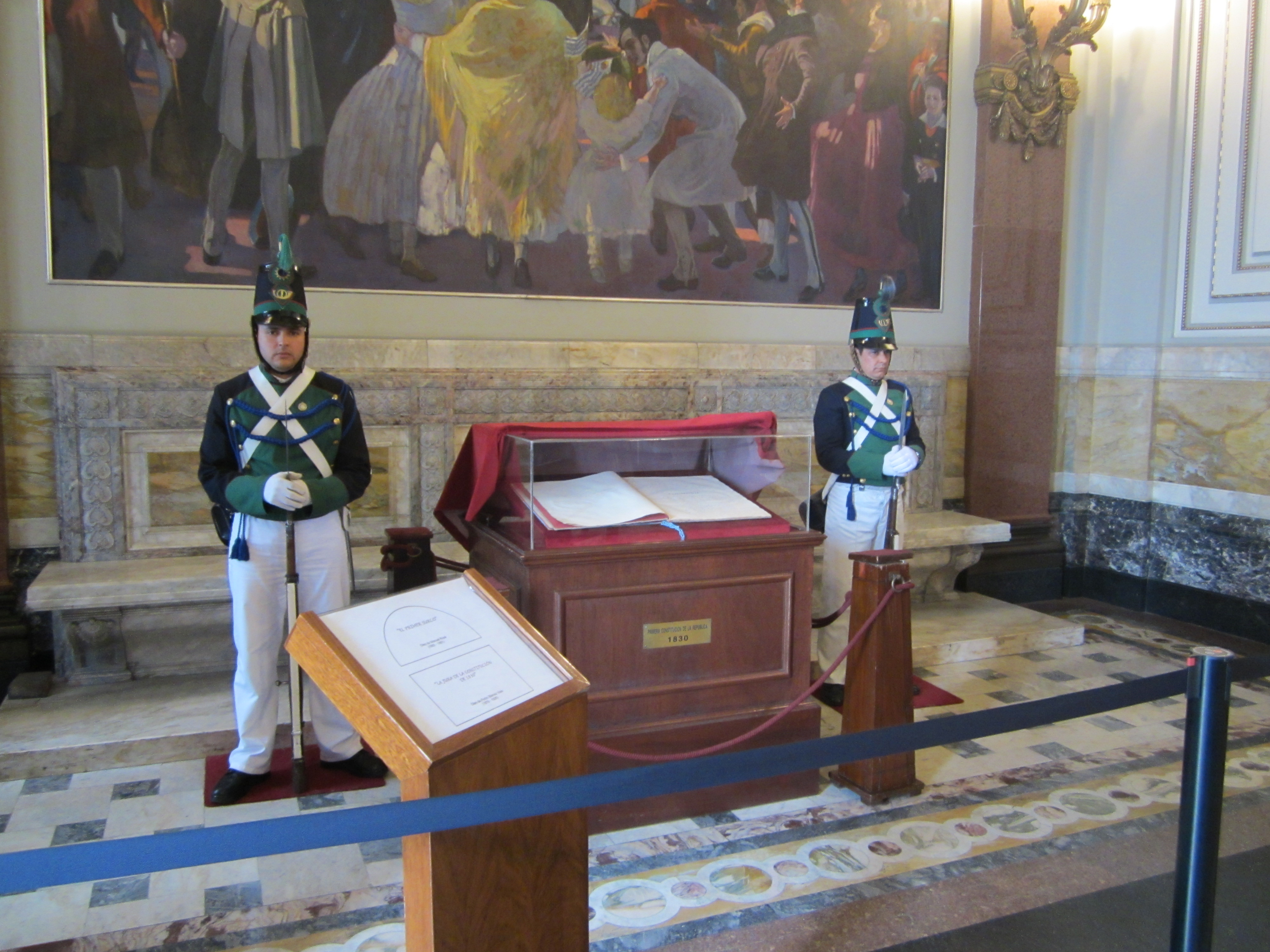
Guards guarding the Constitution

This hall is usually used for art exhibitions, concerts and other events. It has been the site of the lying in state of former presidents and ministers and lying in honor of several Uruguayan personalities, such as Juana de Ibarbourou (who also received the title of "Juana of America" there in 1929), Mario Benedetti, China Zorrilla, Carlos Páez Vilaró, Eduardo Galeano, Carlos Maggi and Alcides Ghiggia. In addition, the Hall of the Lost Steps preserves the original copies of the Constitution of 1830 and the Declaration of Independence of 1825.

==== Special Events Hall ====
Also known as the Party Hall, the works inside are meant to reflect episodes in Uruguayan history, such as "Las Instrucciones del Año XIII" or "El Éxodo del Pueblo Oriental". They exhibit portraits of famous figures, such as Fructuoso Rivera, Manuel Oribe and Juan Antonio Lavalleja. Its ceiling has gilt highlights on the 24-karat gold leaf.

== Gallery ==
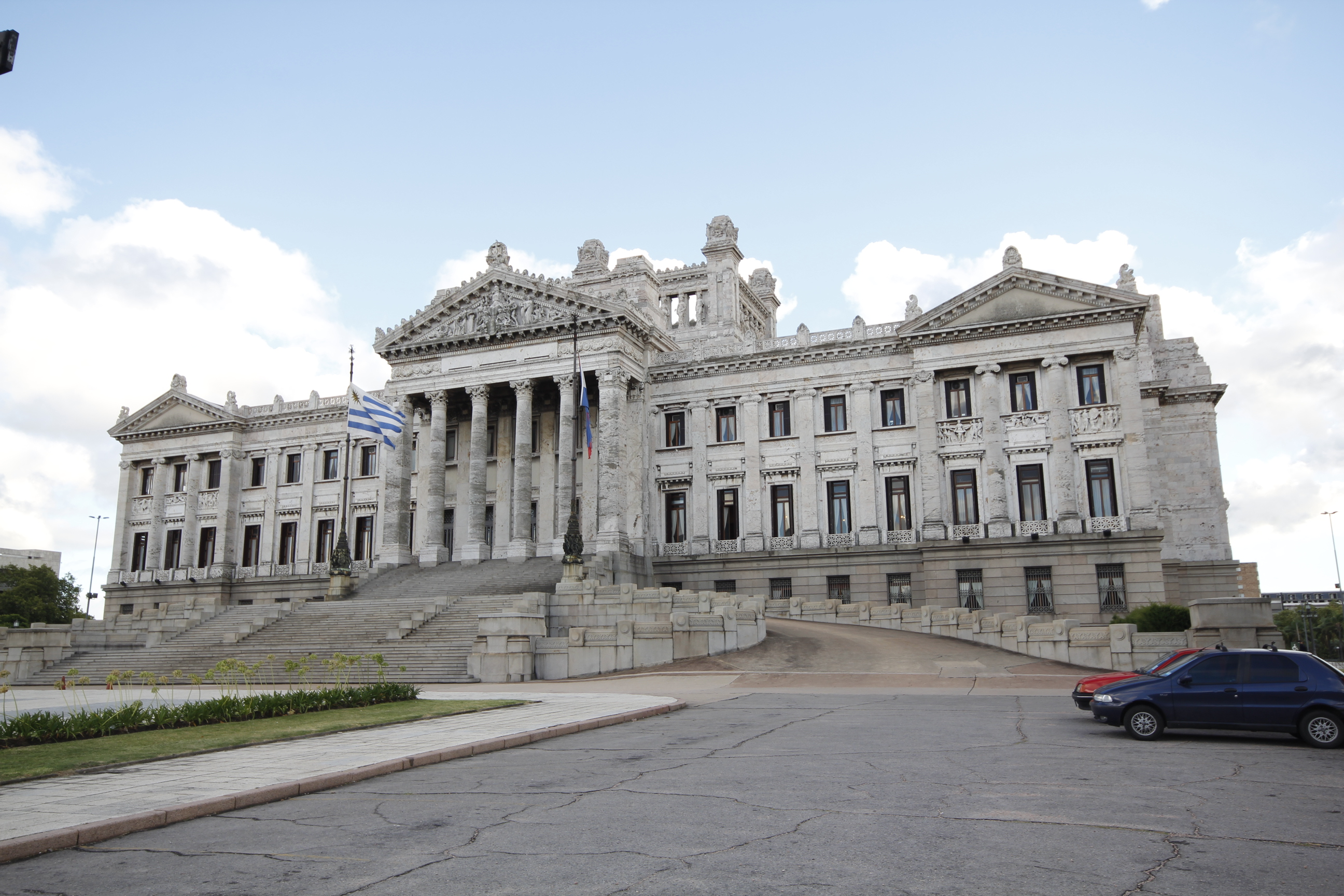
View of the main facade of the legislative palace

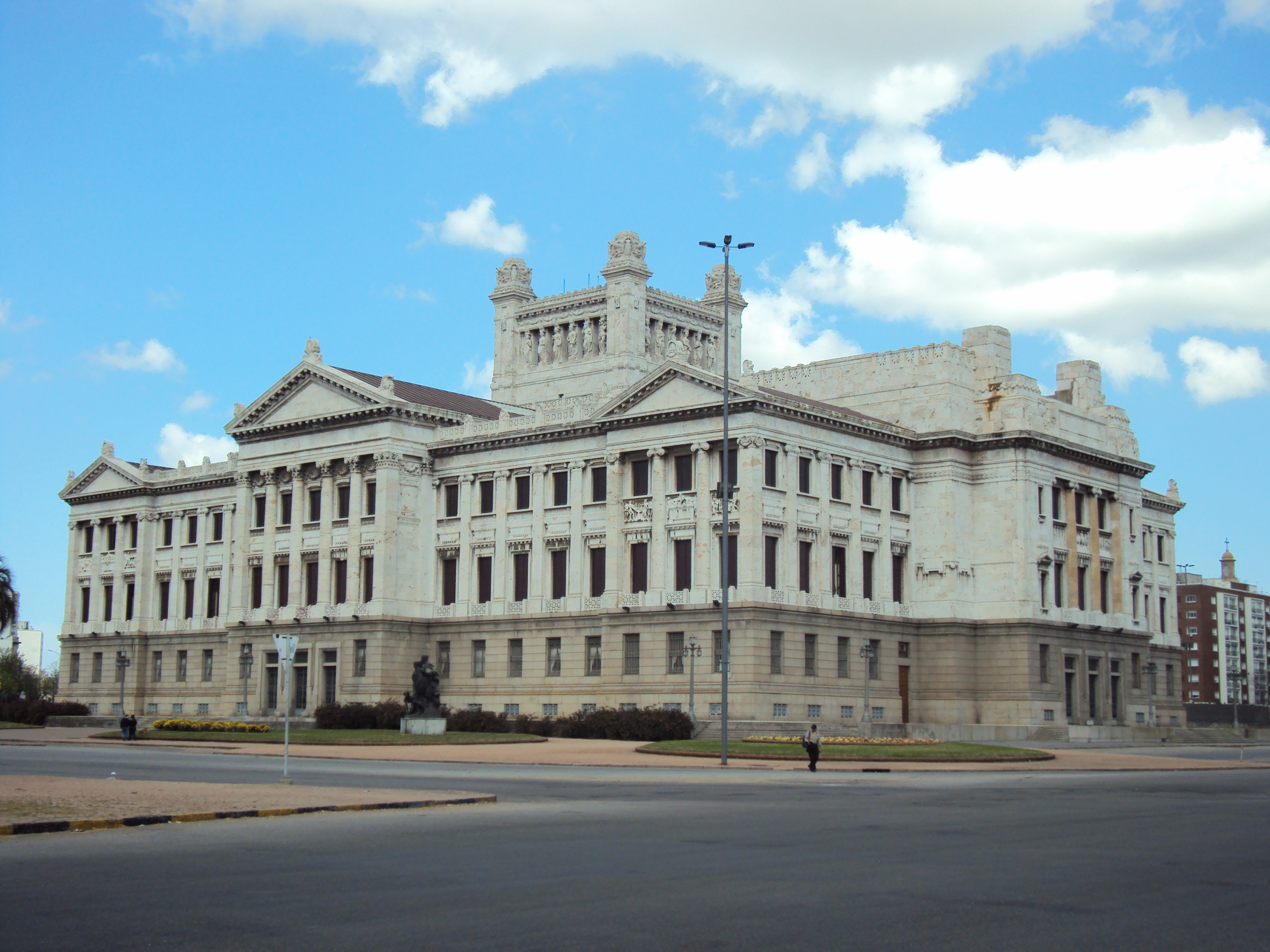
View of the rear of the legislative palace

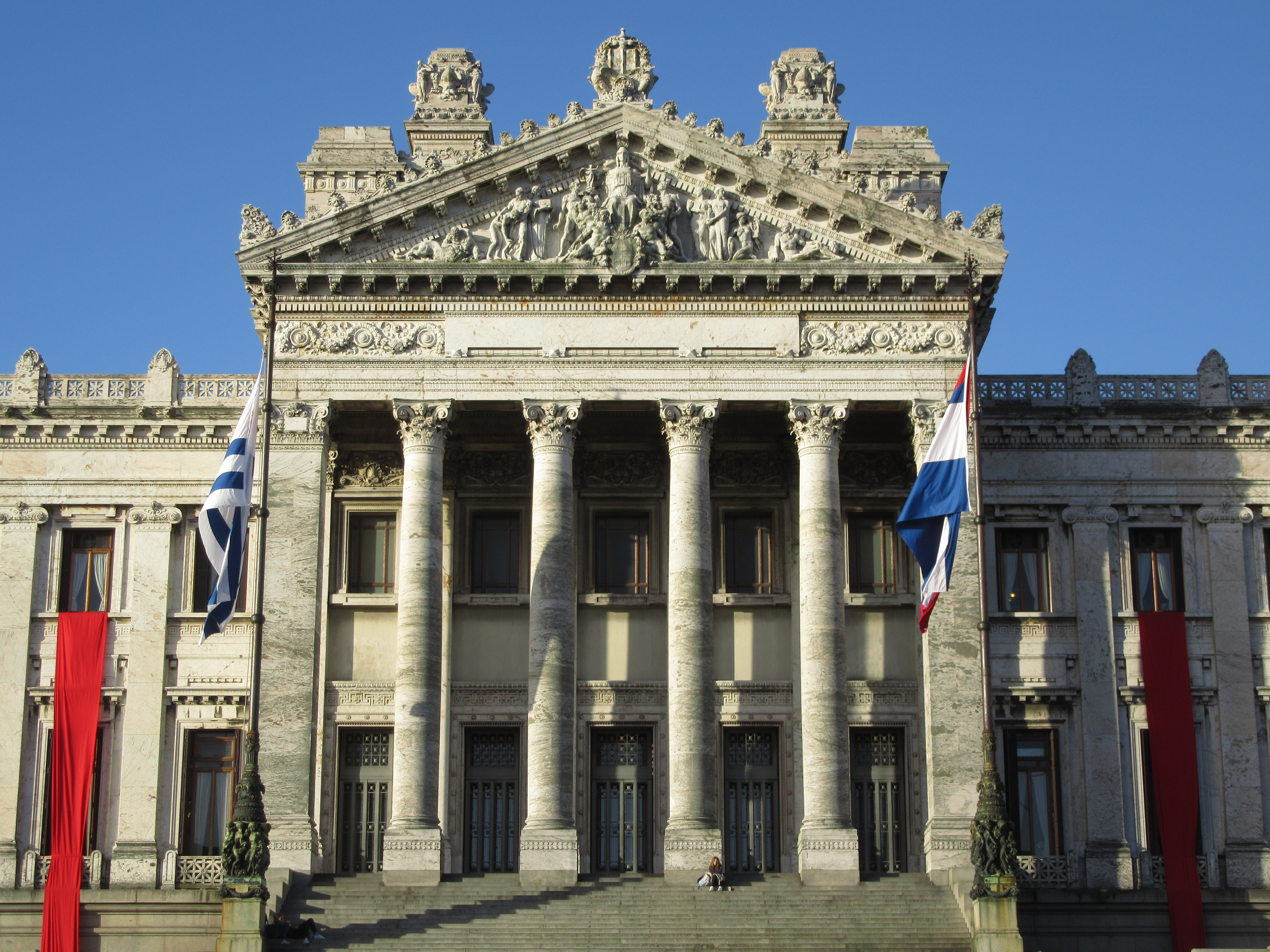
Columns of the main facade and staircase

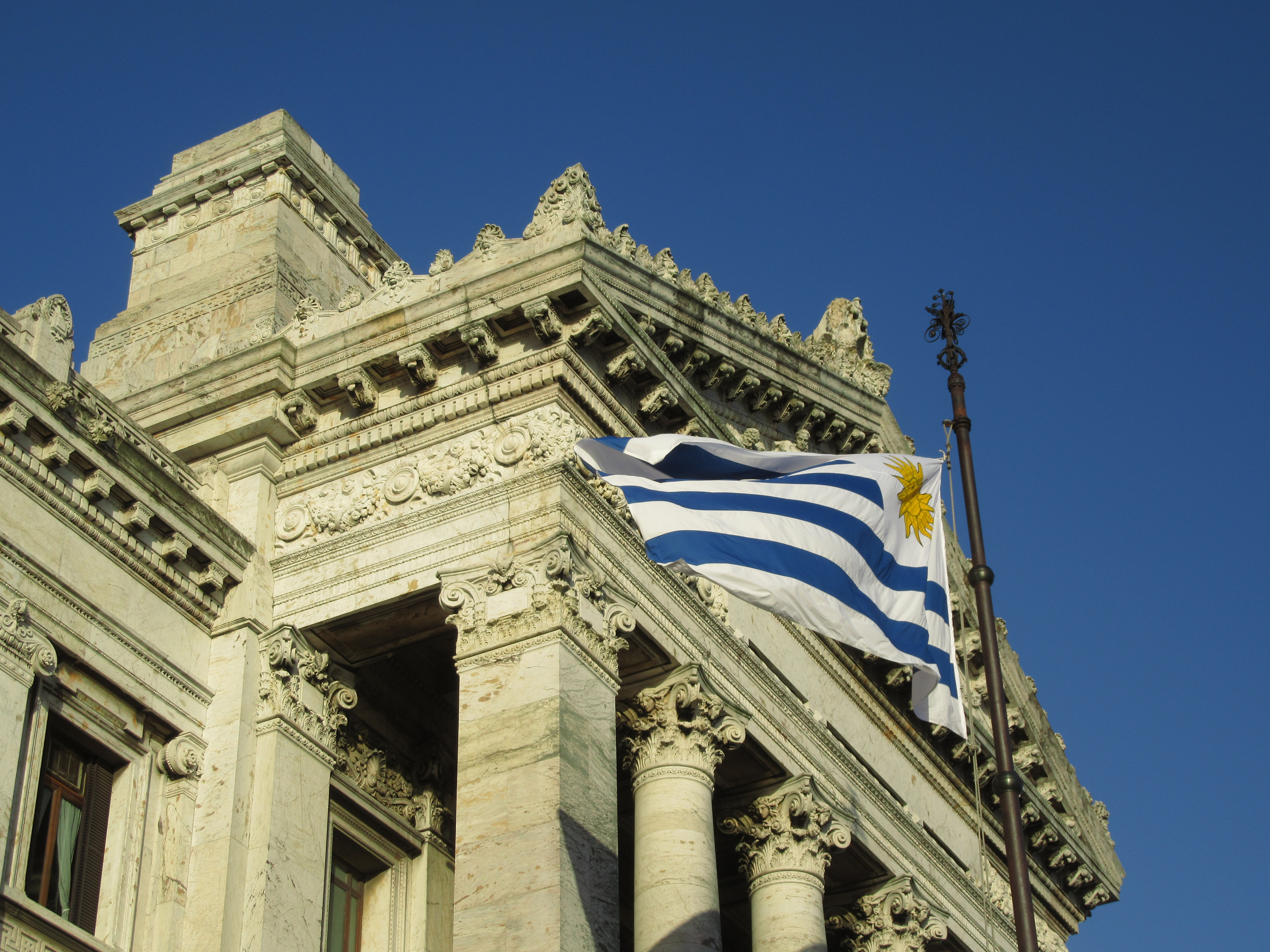
Uruguayan flag waving in front of the palace

== See also ==
- General Assembly of Uruguay
- Chamber of Deputies of Uruguay
- Senate of Uruguay
- Vittorio Meano
