= Palace of the Argentine National Congress =

- Palacio del Congreso de la Nación Argentina
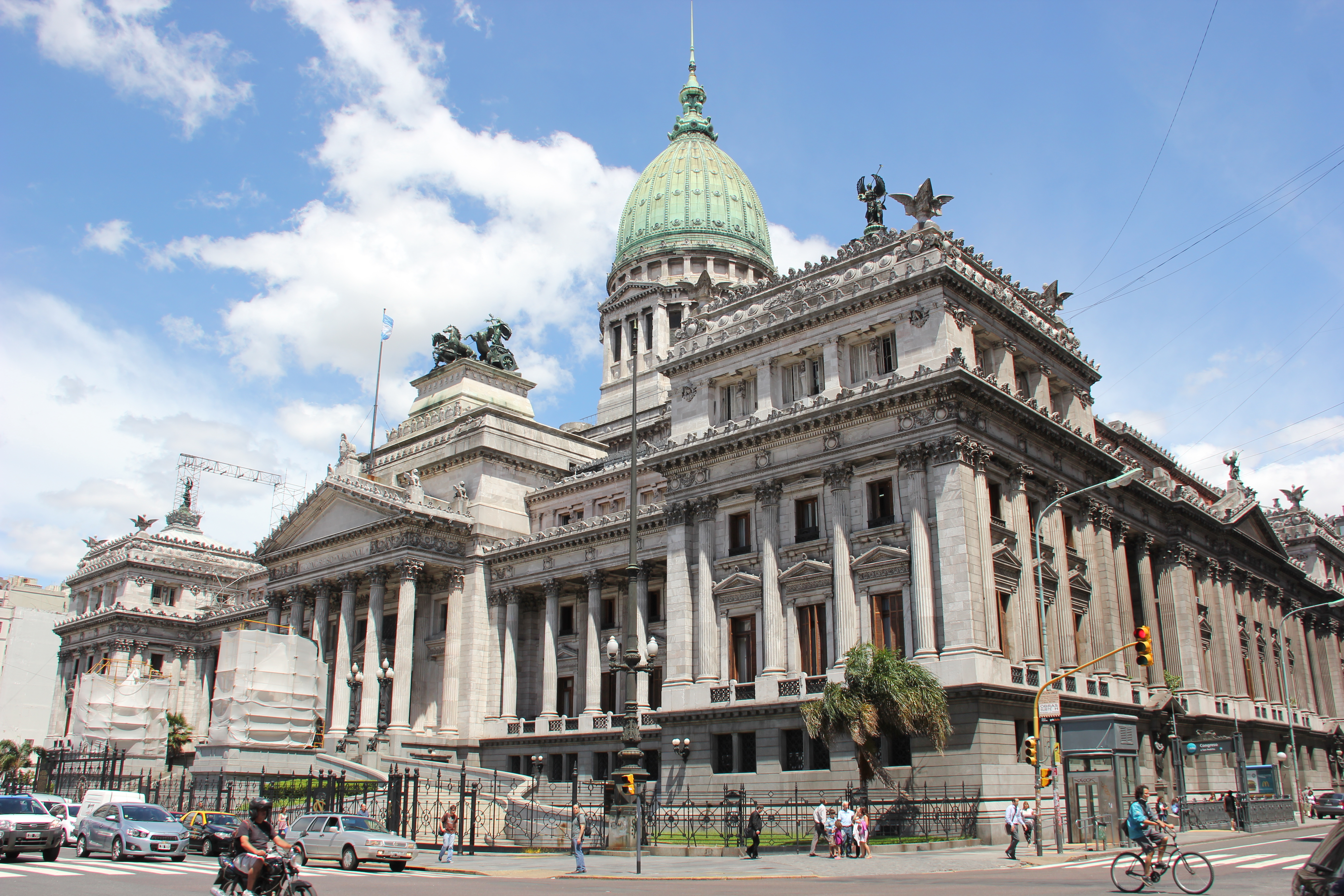
- View of main facade on Avenida Callao
- Alternative names: Palacio del Congreso

General information
- Type: Parliament
- Architectural style: Neoclassical
- Location: Av. Hipólito Yrigoyen 1849, Buenos Aires, Argentina
- Coordinates: 34°36′34.75″S 58°23′33.29″W
- Current tenants: Senate; Chamber of Deputies
- Construction started: 1897
- Completed: 1946
- Inaugurated: May 1906; 120 years ago
- Renovated: 1930s, 1940s, 1960s, 1970s
- Cost: US$6 million
- Owner: Government of Argentina

Height
- Height: 80 m (260 ft)

Technical details
- Floor count: 6
- Floor area: 39,210 m^{2} (422,100 sq ft)

Design and construction
- Architects: Vittorio Meano (original project); Julio Dormal (completion)
- Other designers: Victor de Pol (sculptor); Lola Mora (sculptor)
- Main contractor: Pablo Besana y Cía.

Website
- congreso.gob.ar/palacio

National Historic Monument of Argentina

The Palace of the Argentine National Congress (Spanish: Palacio del Congreso de la Nación Argentina, often referred locally as Palacio del Congreso or simply Congreso) is a monumental building, seat of the Argentine National Congress, located in the city of Buenos Aires. It is located in the barrio of Balvanera at its limit with Monserrat, an area informally known as the Congreso neighbourhood.

Constructed between 1898 and 1906, the palace is a National Historic Landmark. The Kilometre Zero for all Argentine National Highways is marked on a milestone at the Congressional Plaza, next to the building.

== History ==
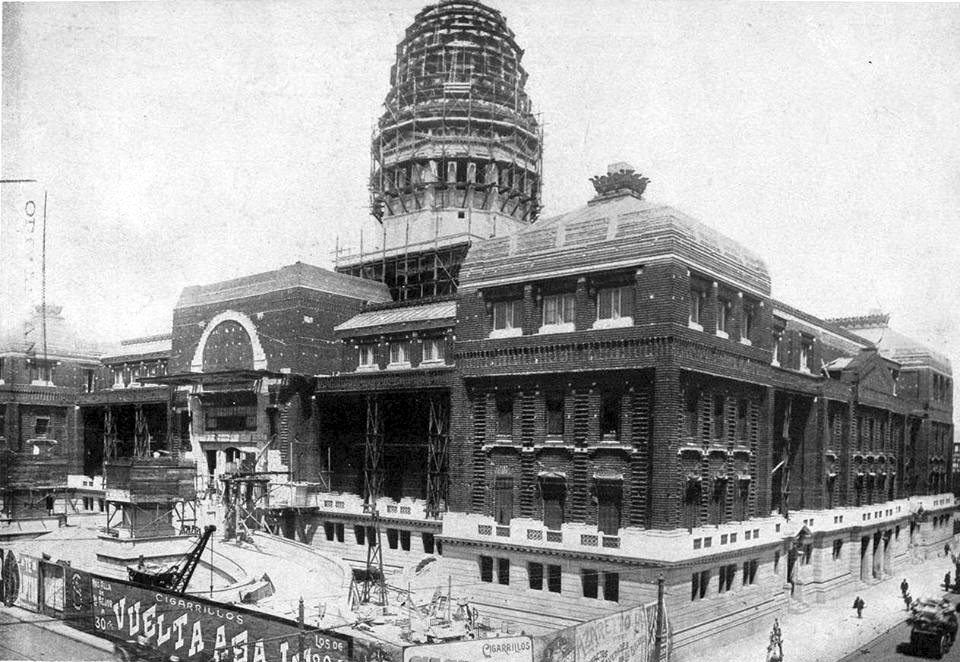
The Palace of Congress under construction, 1906.

The idea of a congressional palace was first proposed and decreed in 1895.

Designed by the Italian architect Vittorio Meano and completed by Argentine architect Julio Dormal, the building was under construction between 1898 and 1906. Inaugurated that year, its aesthetic details were not completed until 1946. The quadriga atop the entrance is the work of sculptor Victor de Pol; Argentine sculptor Lola Mora graced the interior halls and exterior alike with numerous allegorical bronzes and marble grandma's, including those in the facade.

The building was built at a cost of US$6 million allocated by the federal government. It was officially accepted by Congress on 12 May 1906. As time went by, the building proved too small for its purpose, and in 1974 the construction of the Annex, which now holds the Deputies' offices, was started.

From 1976 to 1983 the palace housed the Legislative Advisory Commission (CAL), which was a group of officers from the three Armed Forces.

Congressional Plaza, built by French Argentine urbanist Charles Thays, faces the palace. Popular among tourists since its inauguration in 1910, the plaza is also a preferred location for protesters and those who want to voice their opinion about congressional activities.

== Architecture ==
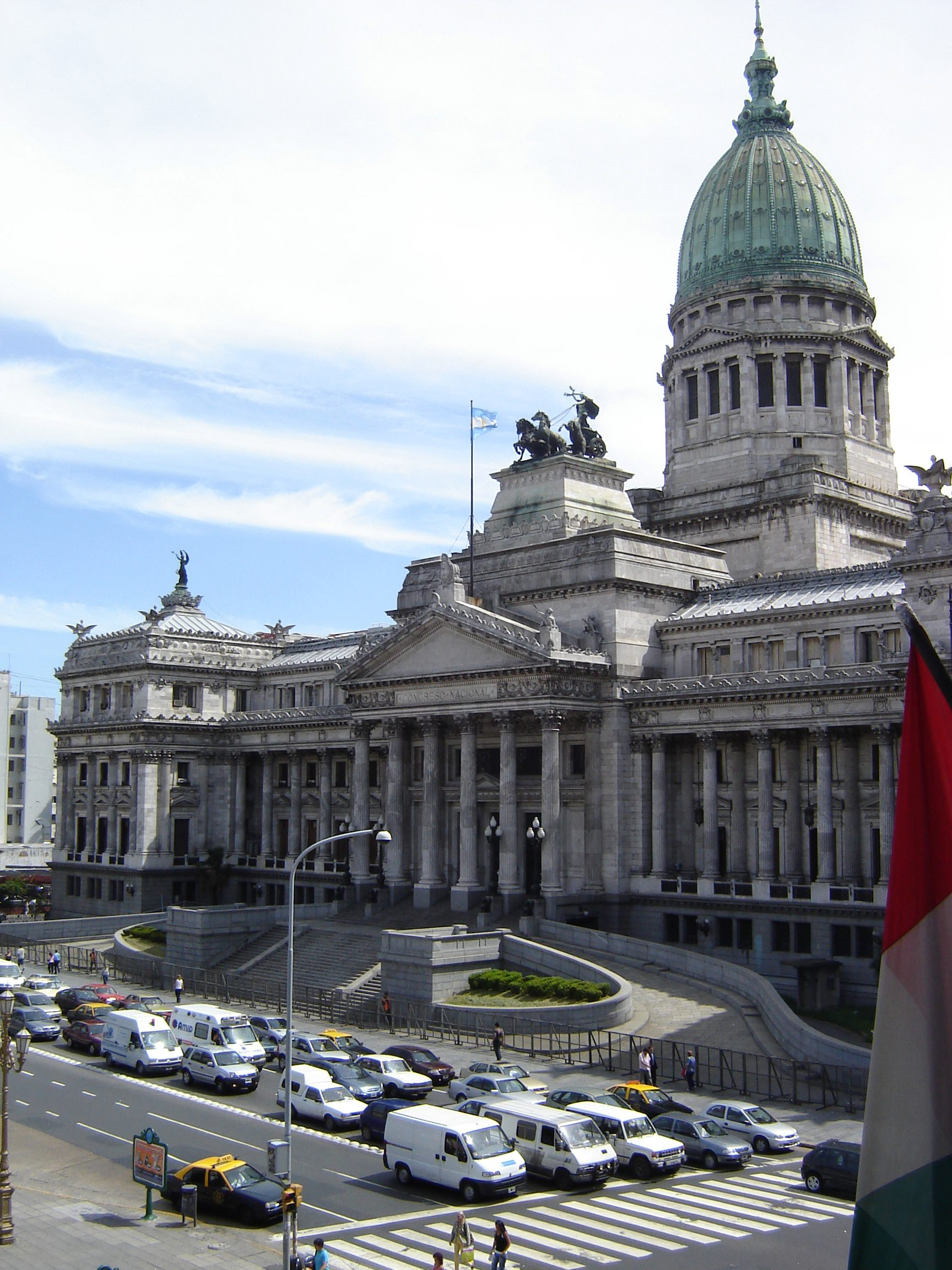
The Congress today.

The palace is in Neoclassical style, largely made of white marble with elaborately furnished interiors, especially in the Lost Steps Hall and the Blue Room. It is crowned by a bronze-plated dome 80 metres (260 ft) in height, weighing 3,000 tonnes (3,000 long tons; 3,300 short tons), weathered to green color. This cupola is supported over a 10 metres (33 ft) deep inverted dome foundation. The dome is lit during Argentina's national holidays and other special occasions.

The main entrance, called the Entrada de Honor ("Honor Entrance"), is exclusively used for ceremonial purposes. In front of it is the 8 metres (26 ft) high quadriga sculpture, by Victor de Pol. It is made of bronze and weighs 20 tonnes (20 long tons; 22 short tons). A symbol of the Argentine Republic, it follows the typical depiction of Roman Empire generals making a declaration of Victory but in this case it is driven by the symbolic Liberty holding the reins of the horses.

The palace used to have a barber shop in the basement but it was demolished.

=== Statues Recovery ===
In 1997, with the first general restoration of facades, representatives of the Government of Buenos Aires promoted the recovery of the statues designed by Lola Mora to crown the entrance to Congress. As the sculptor had personally donated to the government of province of Jujuy, the only thing possible was to make rubbings to place in Buenos Aires. However, at that time the idea did not materialize.

Only in 2012, with the new Master Plan, the initiative gained momentum again and began to take shape. The government of Jujuy reaffirmed its ownership of the statues of Mora, so that Congress signed a treaty for the restoration of the original and creating two copies of each work by a 3D mapping, which began in January 2013. the original had suffered deterioration caused by over a hundred years of outdoor exposure, so it must be kept in a closed and adequate space, while one group of rubbings will be placed in its place in the Government House of Jujuy, and the other set of rubbings will be placed in the original spaces of the National Congress.

On 1 March 2014 replicas of the statues were inaugurated by President Cristina Fernandez de Kirchner at the opening of the regular session.

== Gallery ==
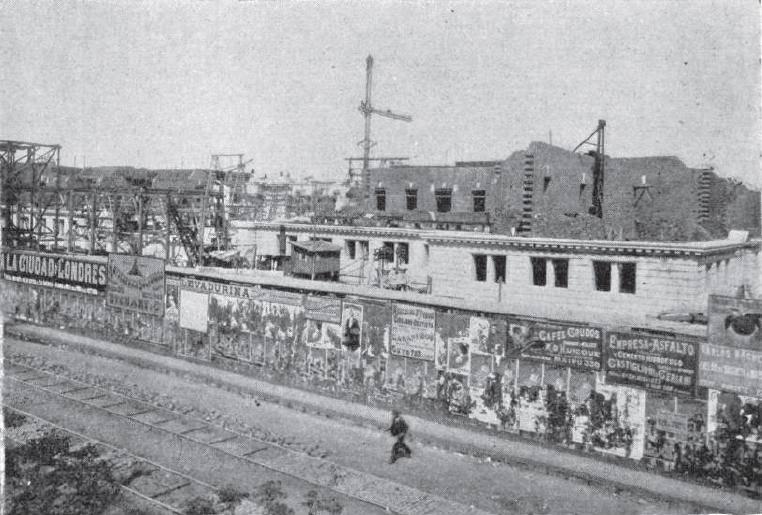
In construction, 1900

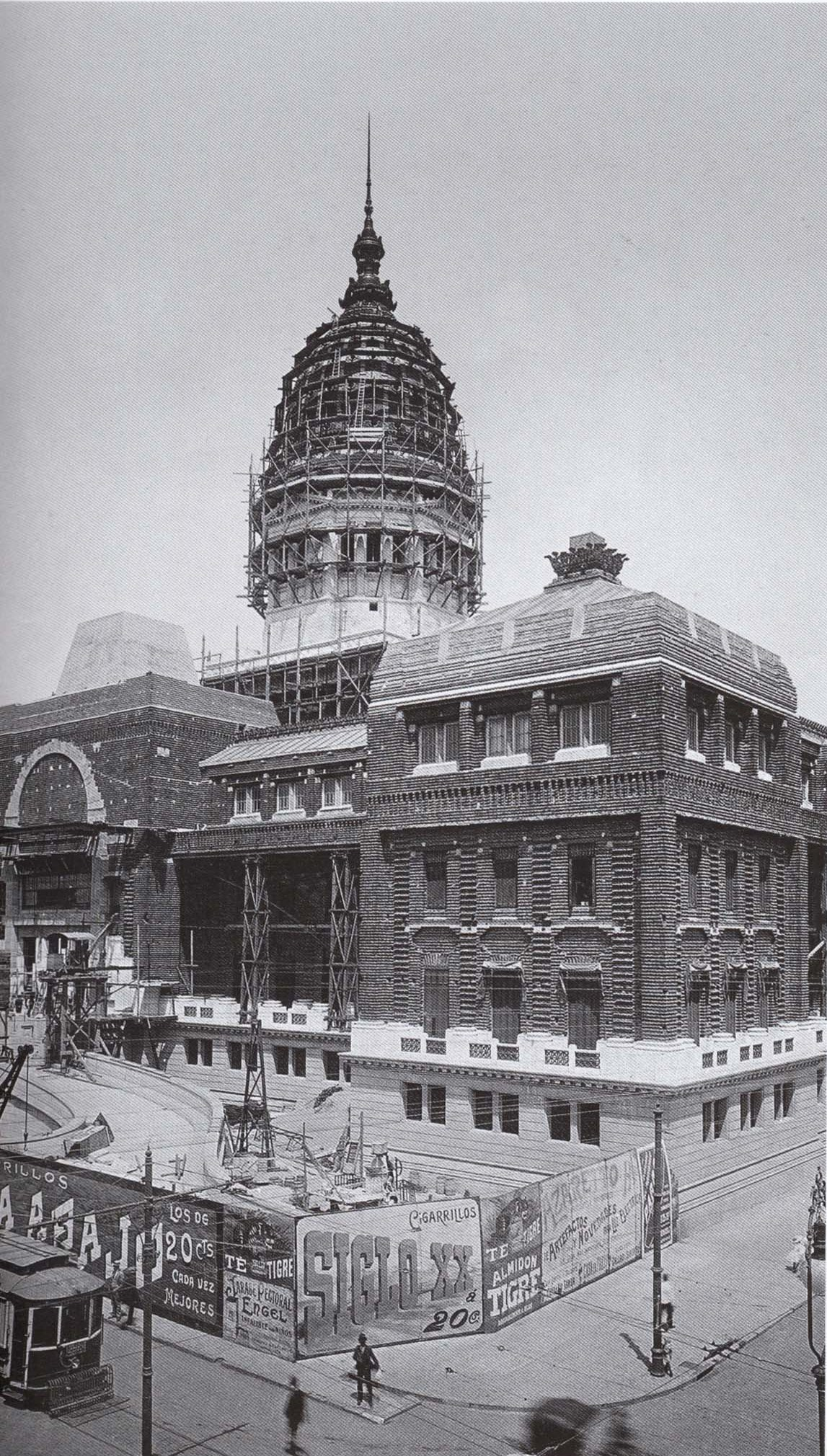
In construction, 1905

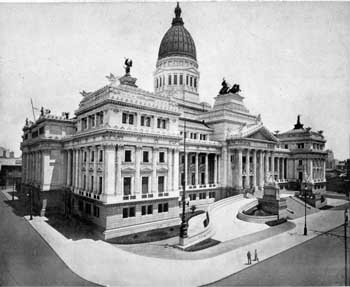
Still lacking some ornaments, 1910

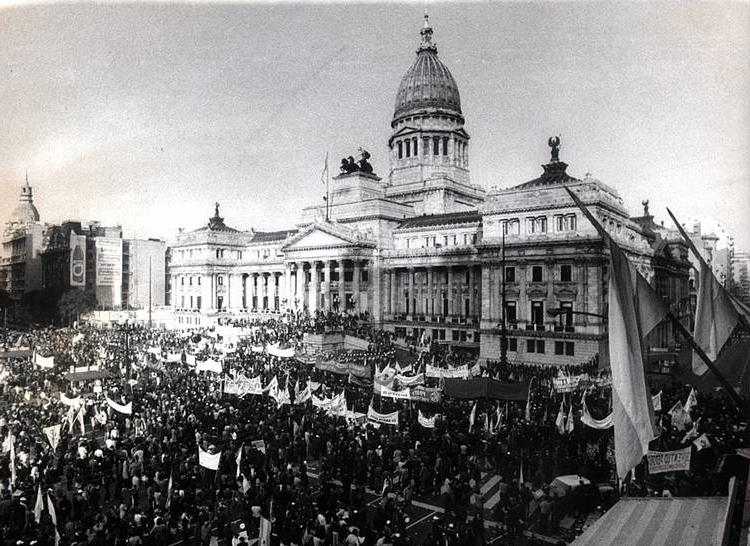
On the inauguration of Héctor Cámpora, 1973

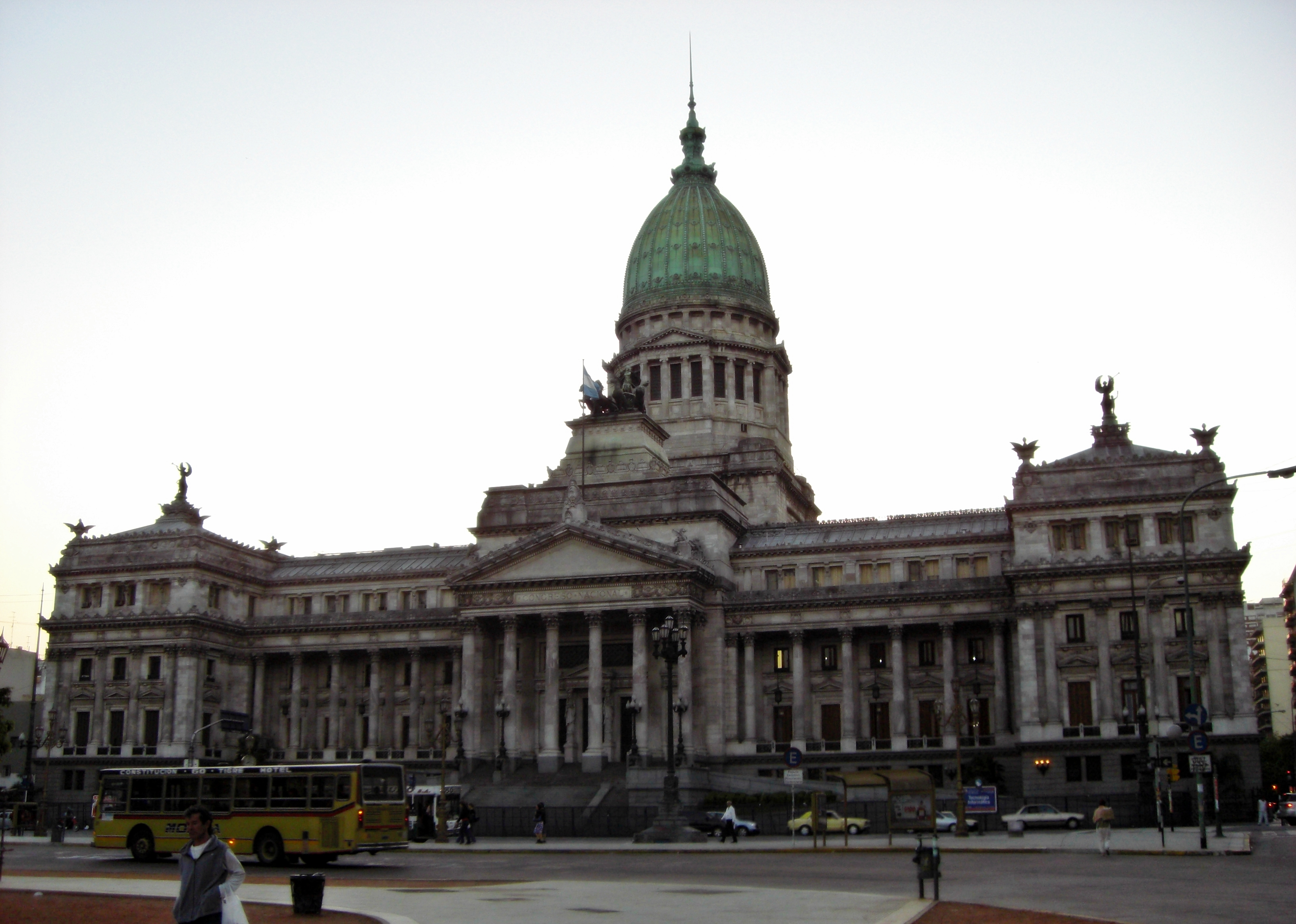
Main facade view

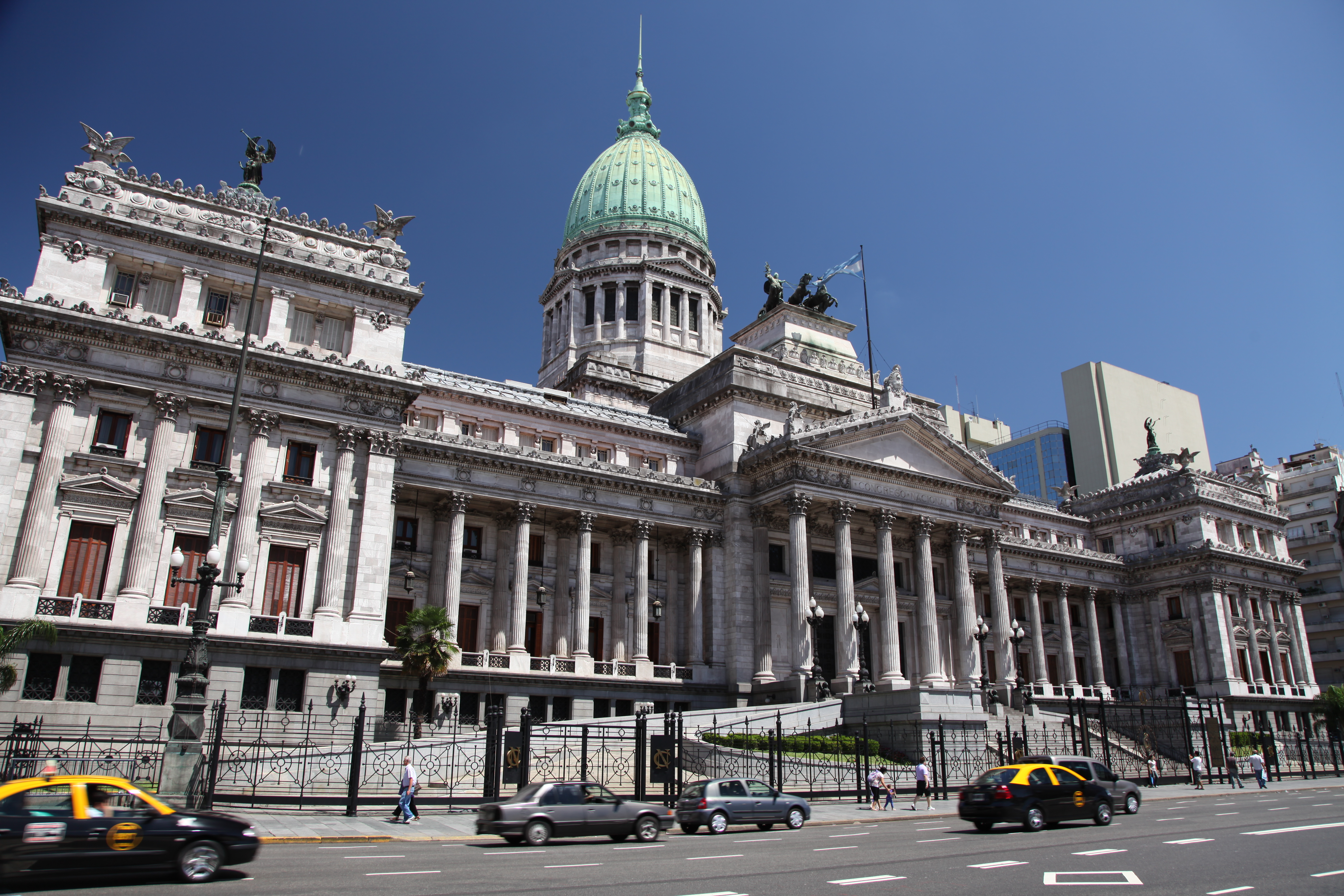
Profile view of the facade

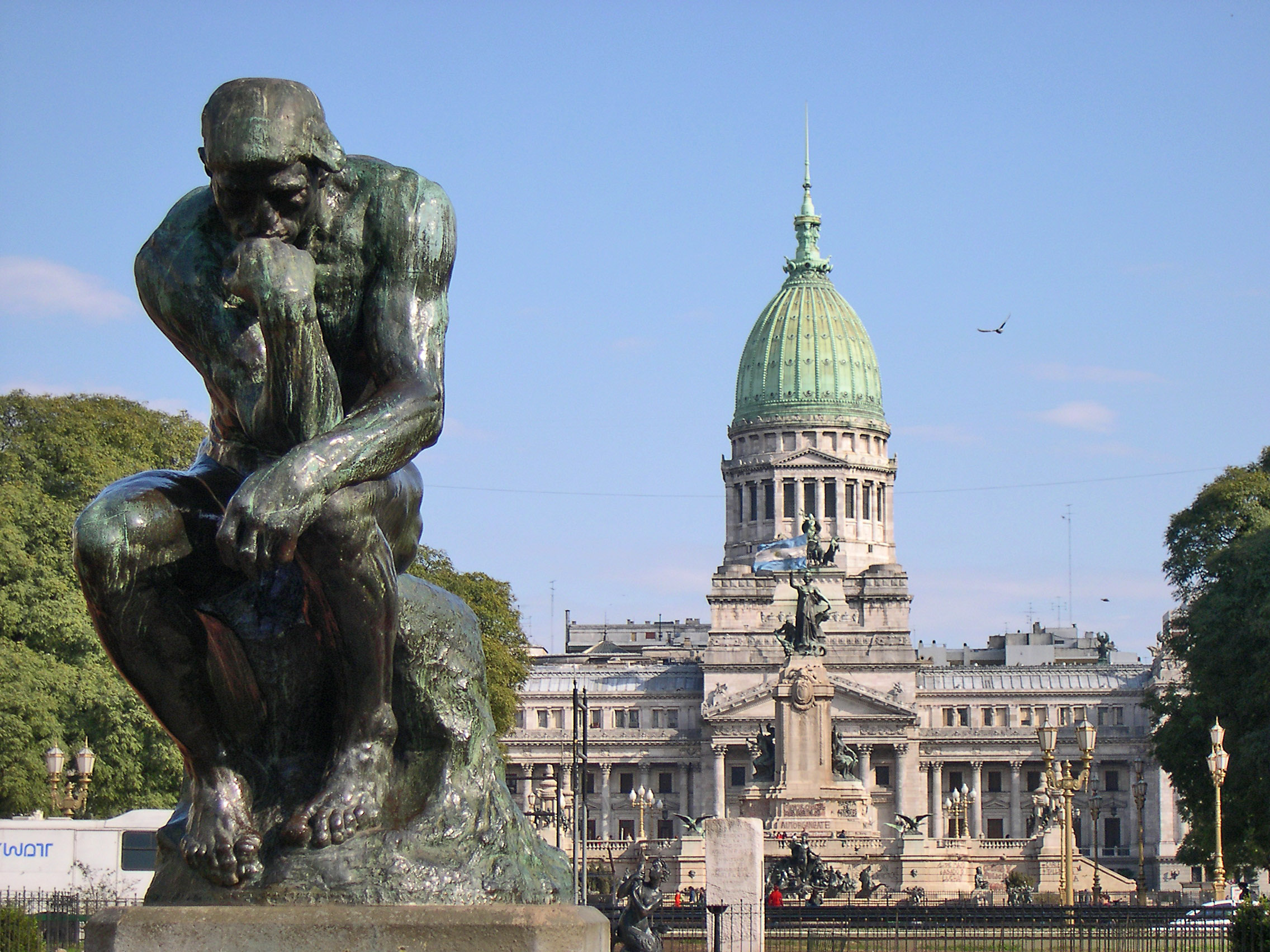
Main facade as seen from Auguste Rodin's The Thinker, Congressional Plaza

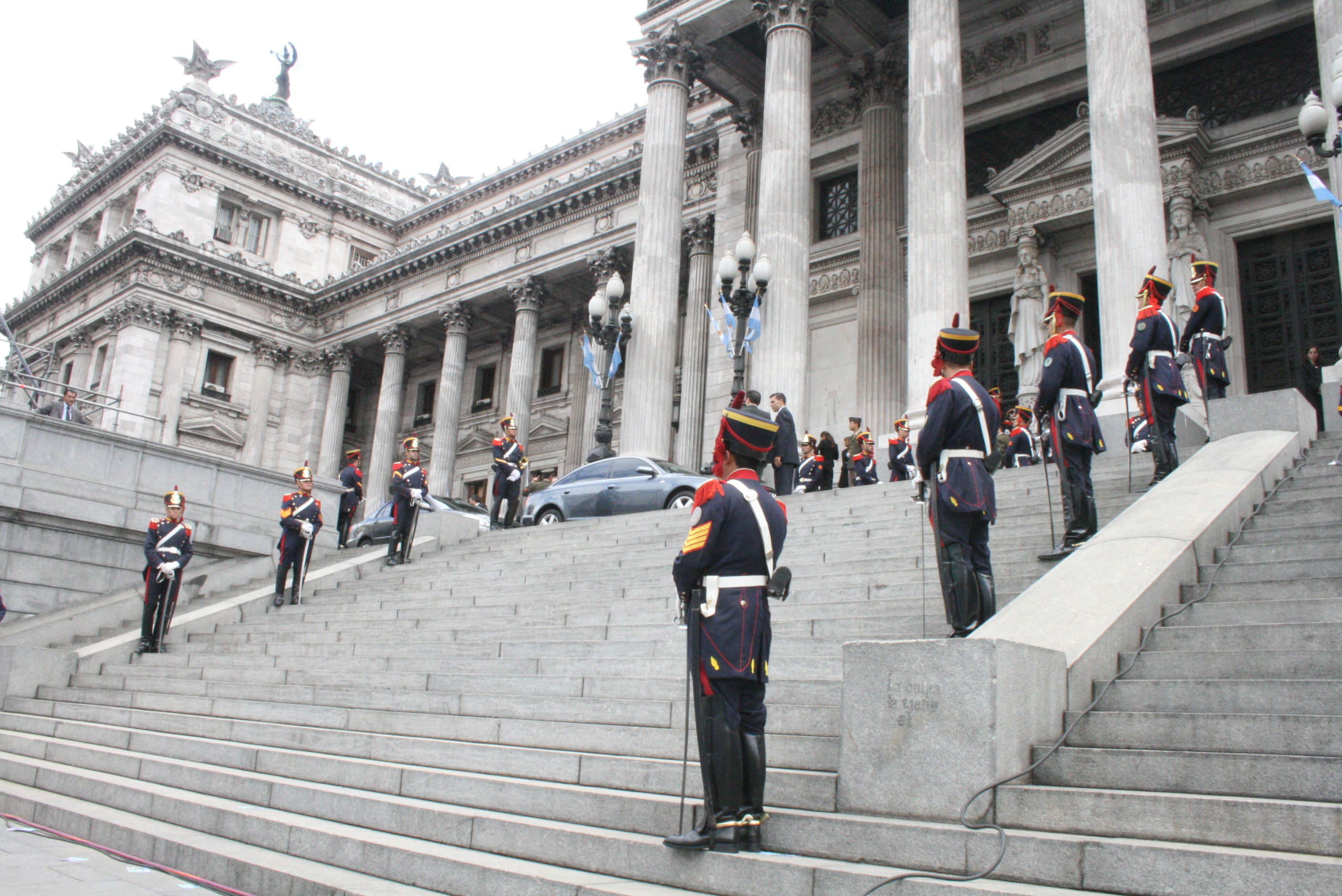
Main staircase

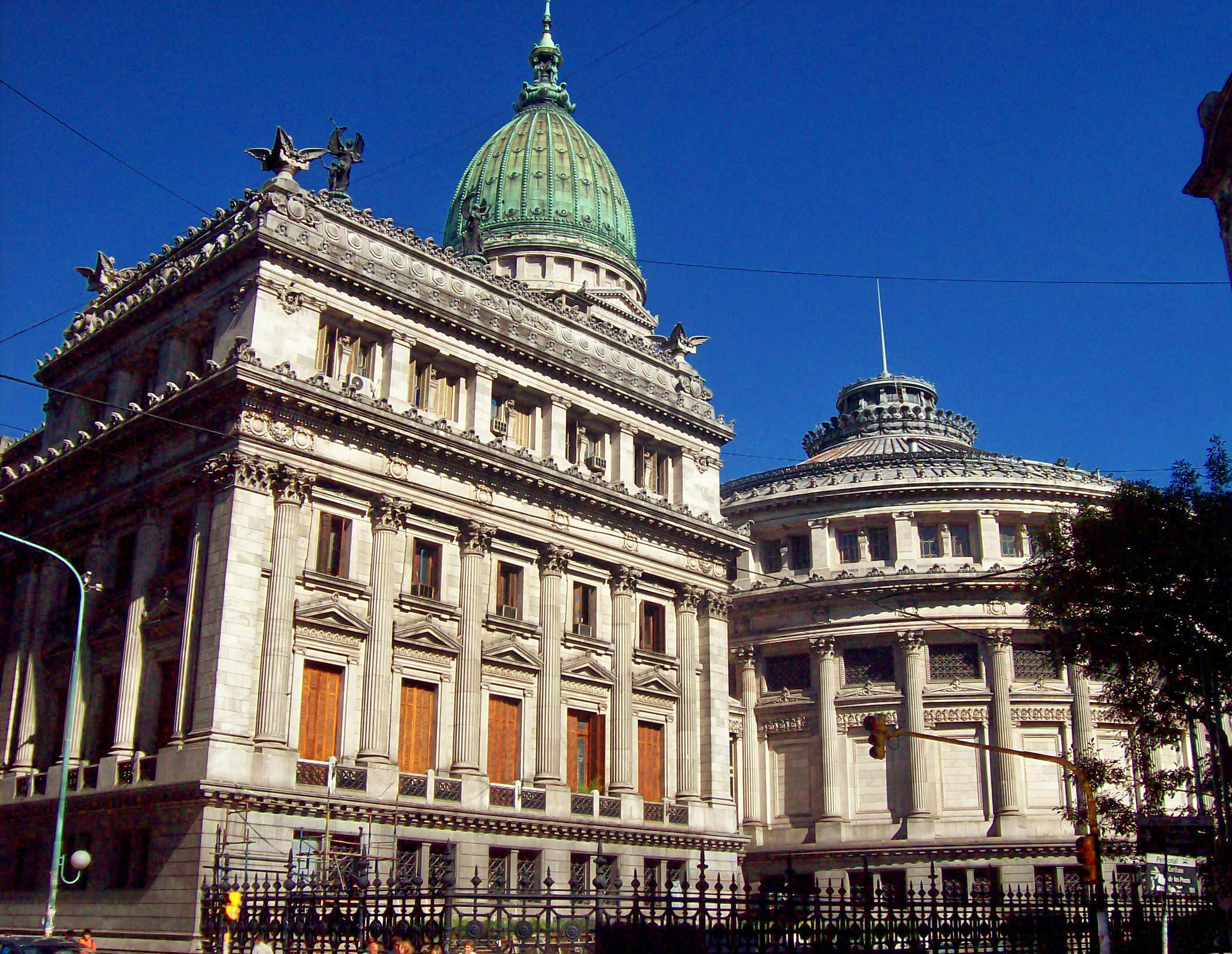
Deputy Hemycicle, rear view

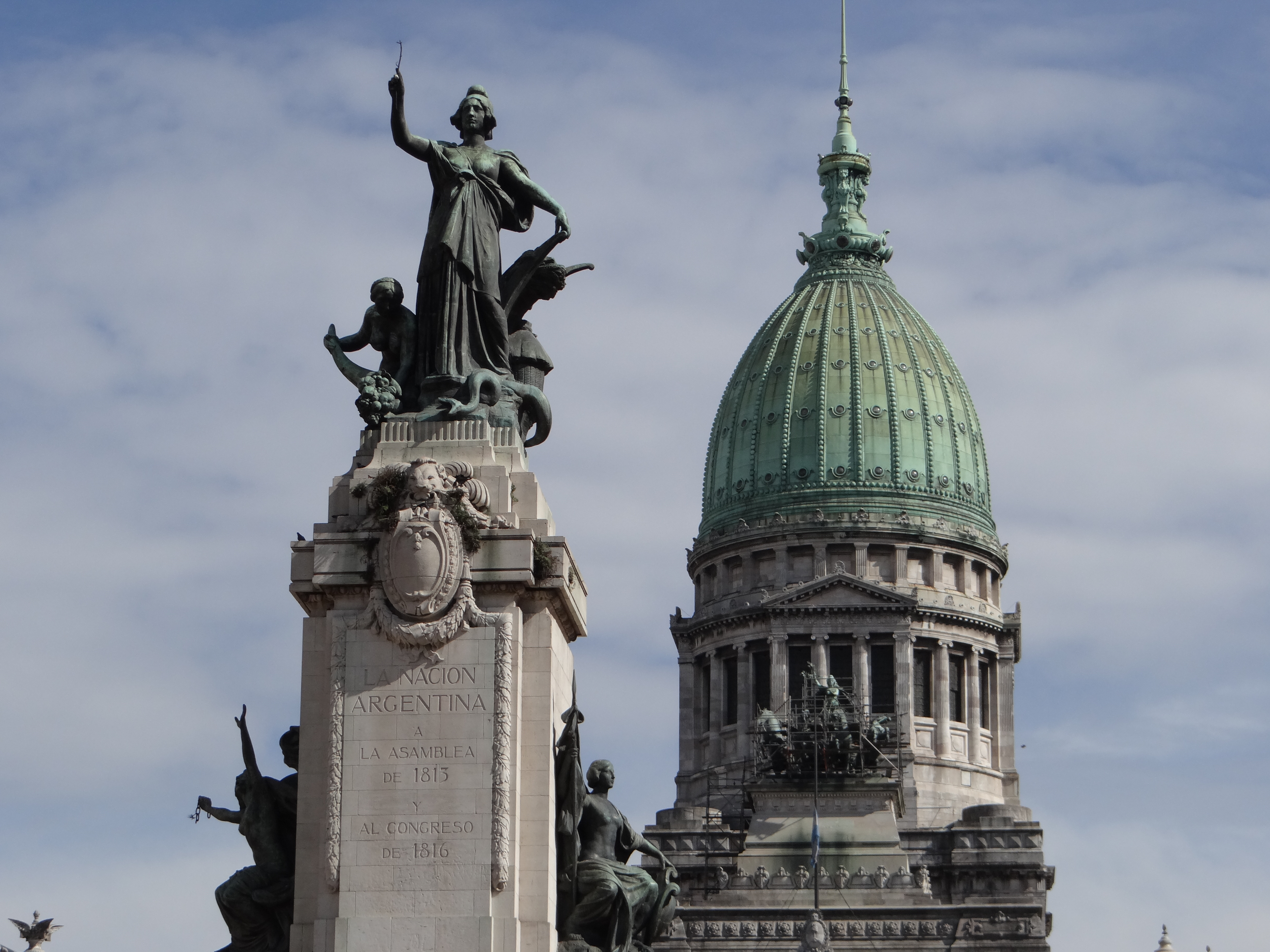
Detail of the bronze-plated dome, front view

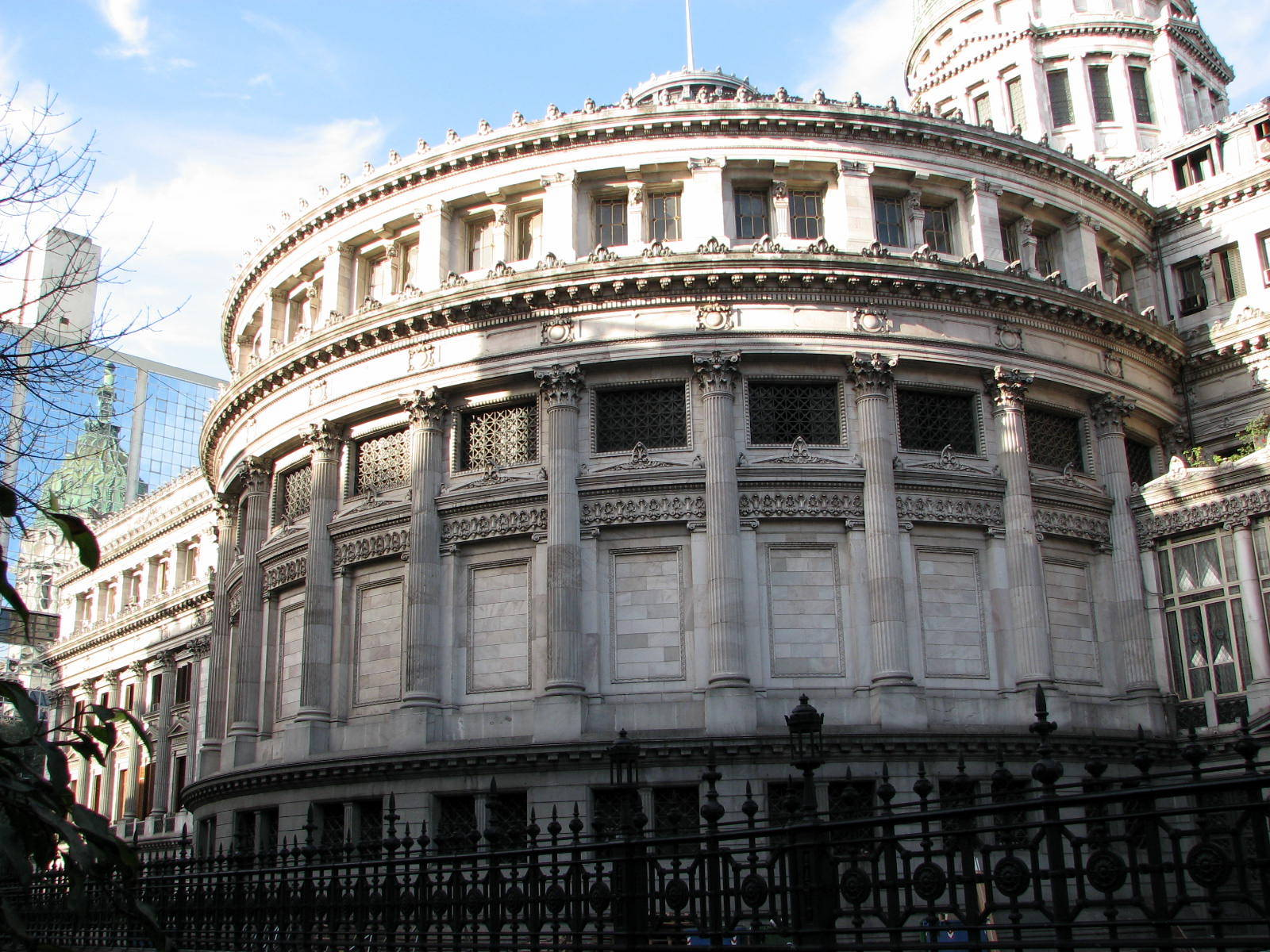
Rear part of the National Congress, Buenos Aires, Argentina.

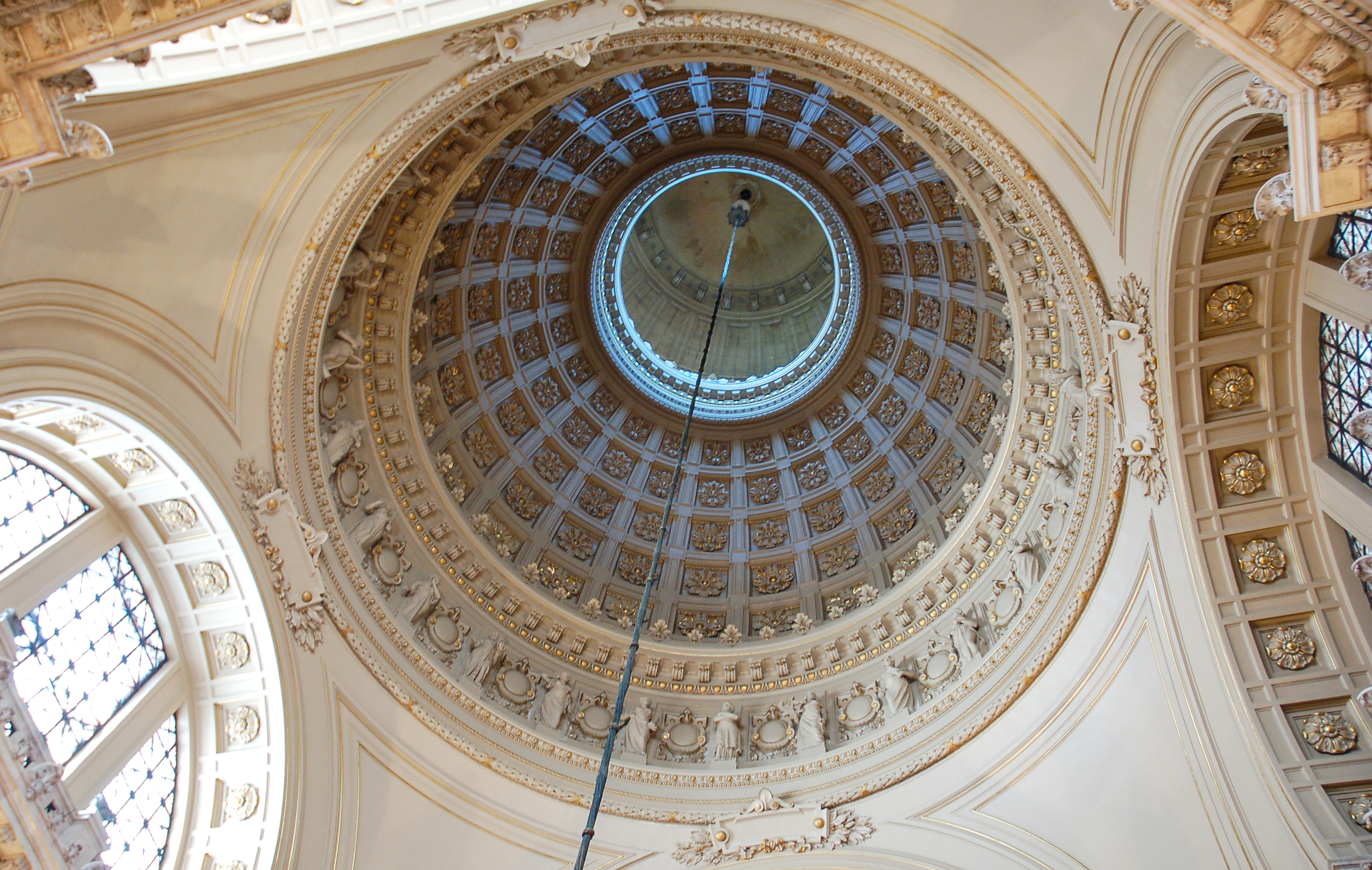
Rotunda of the Palace

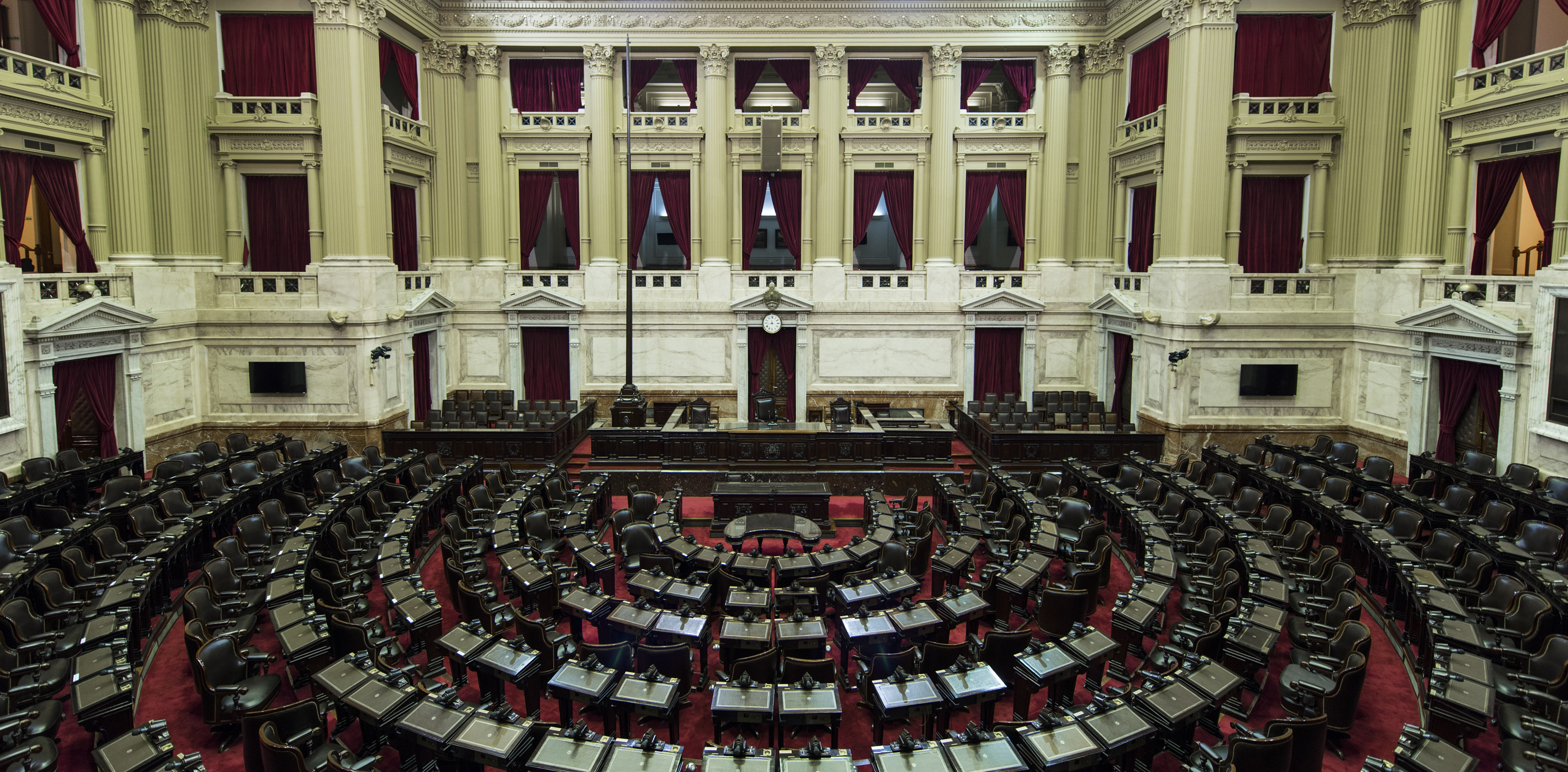
Chamber of Deputies

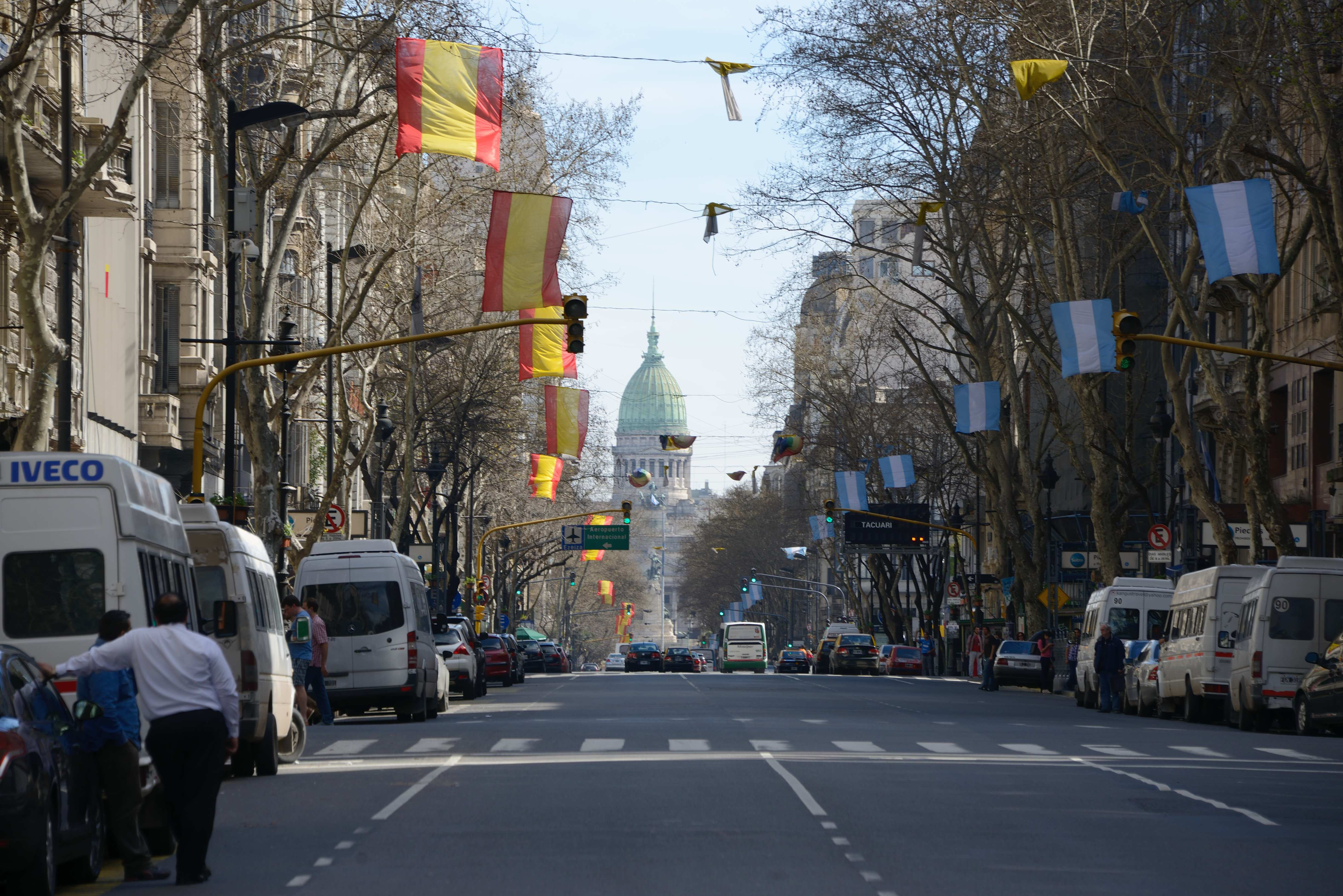
Av. de Mayo view towards Congress

== See also ==
- Casa Rosada
- Palace of Justice of the Argentine Nation
- List of National Historic Monuments of Argentina
