= Julio Dormal =

Belgian architect

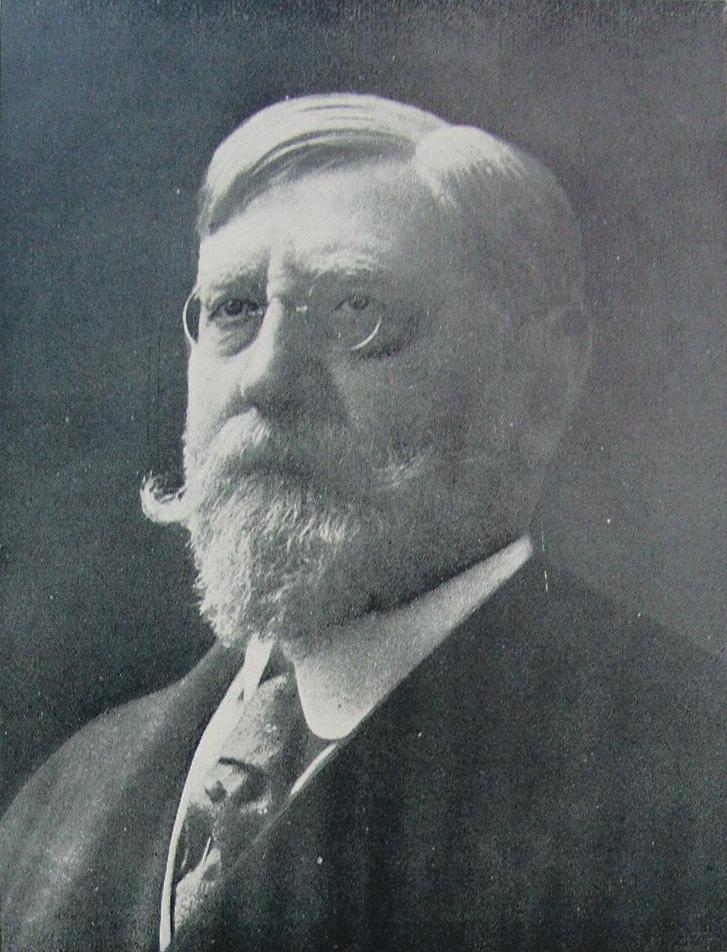
Julio Dormal

Julio Dormal Godet (1846–1924) was a Belgian architect who, after studying in Paris, arrived in Argentina in 1868 where he became one of the first exponents of the Beaux-Arts style of architecture.

He built the Palermo Race Course and designed the layout of Parque Tres de Febrero, a park in the neighbourhood of Palermo in Buenos Aires, completed in 1876.

Construction of the Congress building, designed by the Italian architect Vittorio Meano, began in 1898. After Meano's murder in 1904, Dormal took the project through to its completion in 1906, respecting Meano's original designs.

In the city of La Plata, Dormal was involved with the building of the Government House, and in Buenos Aires with the final details of the Teatro Colón and with the remodeling of the old Teatro Opera.

Dormal took over the building of the Pereda Palace in Buenos Aires, begun in 1919 for the wealthy doctor and cattle rancher Celedonio Pereda, when Pereda fell out with the original French architect, Louis Martin. Dormal died in 1924 and did not see the building through to its completion in 1936. Since 1944 the Palacio Pereda has been used as the residence of the Brazilian ambassador.
