= Pereda Palace =

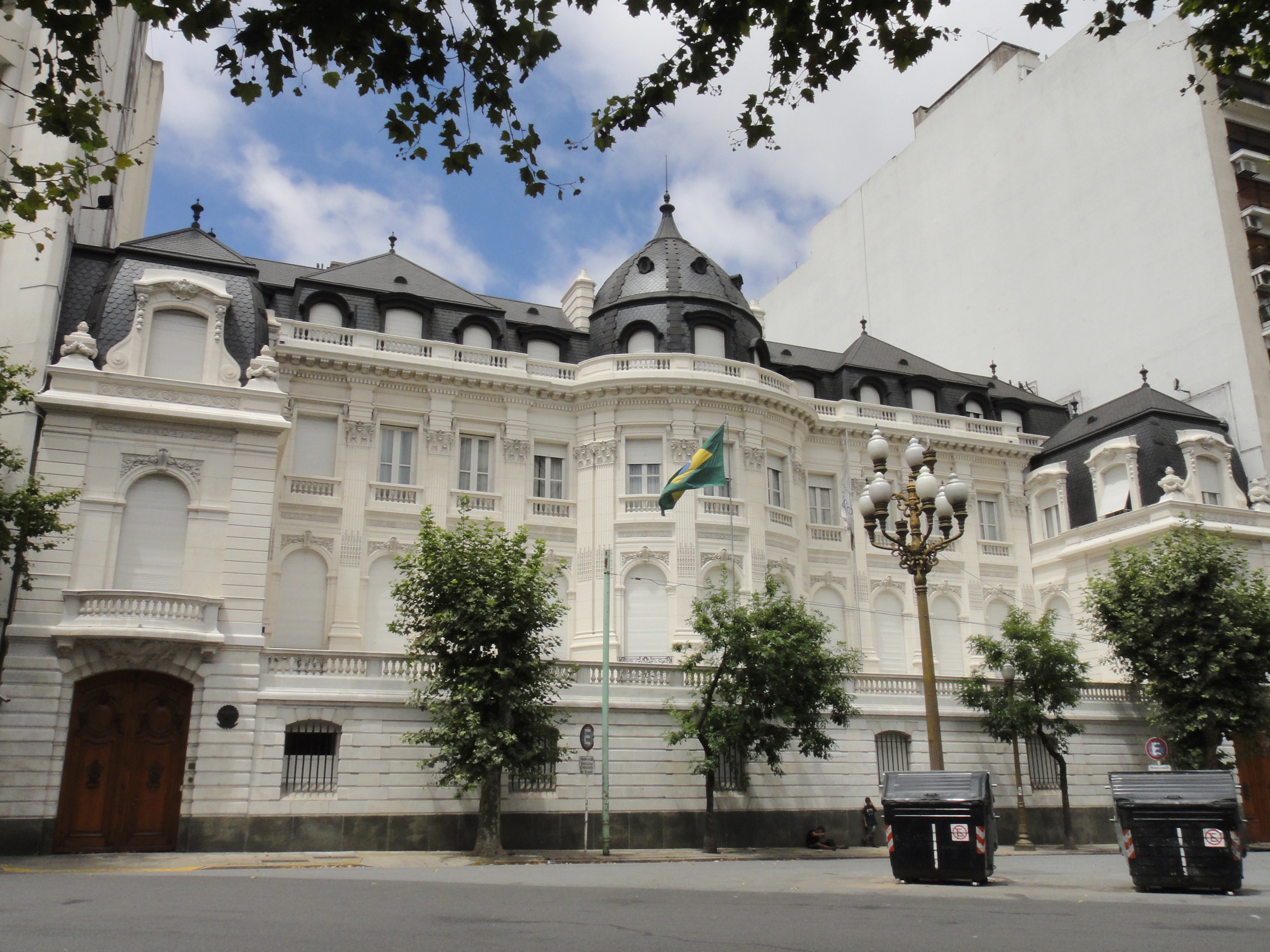
- Facade of the embassy

- Location within Argentina
- Alternative names: Pereda Girado Palace

General information
- Status: Diplomatic use
- Architectural style: Pastiche – Eclecticism between Belle Époque & Haussmannien style
- Location: Retiro, Ciudad de Buenos Aires, 1130 Arroyo Street (C1010AAH), Argentina, Argentina
- Coordinates: 34.5915°S 58.3837°W
- Construction started: 1919
- Completed: 1936
- Owner: Federal government of Brazil (since 1944)

Technical details
- Floor count: 3 with mansard and cupola
- Floor area: 4,000 square metres (43,000 sq ft)

Design and construction
- Architects: Léonard Louis Martin & Jules Dormal Godet

Website
- http://buenosaires.itamaraty.gov.br/es-es/

The Pereda Palace is an old manor located in front of the Plazoleta Carlos Pellegrini, at the beginning of Avenida Alvear, in Buenos Aires, at number 1130 Arroyo St. It was built by the doctor and large farmer (122.000 hectares) Celedonio Tomás Pereda (1860–1941) and his wife María Justina Girado (1865–1942), member of a family of landowners as she was the granddaughter of Juan Elías Girado (1794–1858), owner of the ″Estancia San Juan″ (250.000 hectares). The building is currently the residence of the Ambassador of Brazil in Buenos Aires and headquarters of the Cultural Space of the Embassy.

The remarkable urban group formed by the palace and its surroundings, like few places in Buenos Aires, reflect the strong influence exercised by French architecture in Argentina, especially during the first decades of the 20th century. They collaborate to reinforce the Parisian tonality of the place the irregular layout of the streets of the sector and the undoubted French image of several private residences, imposing and of admirable design.

== Construction's history and owners ==
The building was begun to build in 1919 (but the projectual work began already in 1917) by the French architect Léonard Louis Martin following the strict wishes of the owner: Recreate here a version (pastiche) of the Jacquémart André Palace in Paris (converted into a museum in 1913); and in the back, on the gardens, make a descent in the style of the Escalier in fer à cheval ("Horseshoe staircase") of the castle of Fontainebleau. In 1920, and because of not being satisfied with the work done on the perron, the owner replaces Martin with the Belgian architect Jules Dormal Godet who was then in charge of the works of the Teatro Colón. Mr. Raymond Rerny of the Paris firm Jansen was hired to decorate the interiors.

In 1935, Brazilian President Getúlio Vargas was invited by the Pereda Family, during an official visit to Argentina, and was delighted with the palace. Seven years later and after the death of both members of Pereda marriage, his heirs offered the palace to Brazil, whose ambassador Mr. João Batista Luzardo signed the contract of sale on July 6, 1945 -for exchange, Brazil yielded the building of the old embassy (at 1500 Callao avenue) plus 4,000 tons of iron bars (material that can not be broken by the war) in exchange for the beautiful palace and its entire inventory.

== Works of art and decoration ==
The ceilings of the state rooms (the five most important of its fifty rooms) in the first floor, are the work of the Catalan painter Josep María Sert i Badía who made the paintings in his Parisian atelier on Barbet de Jouy street after receiving the models of said rooms. The fabrics arrived to the city by boat in 1932 and were installed by Mr. Carlos Lagazio, following the instructions of the artist, with the system of marouflage. The one in the music room is called Aprés la pluie le beau temps ("After rain the good weather"), also known as El agujero celeste ("The Celestial Hole", oil on canvas, 6,60m x 8,30m) a painting that represents big storm clouds. The great hall presents a painting (a "trompe l'oeil") called Los equilibristas. ("The equilibrist", oil on canvas, 6m x 12m) of tinkers suspended in the air with 78 figures in violent foreshortening. The painting of the main dining room called El aseo de Don Quijote ("The toilet of Don Quixote", oil on canvas, 5,60m x 10,20m) another "trompe l'oeil" that represents the mocking episode in which Don Quixote is shaved by the ladies. Other works are: La tela de araña ("The spider web", oil on canvas, 5m x 7,20m) in the daily dining room, and Diana la cazadora ("Diana the hunter", oil on canvas, 6,60m x 7,80m) in the Salón Dorado ("State Hall"). Also noteworthy are the masterful use of the stucco, the eighteenth-century European furniture, the woods (all in Slavonian oak, except in the main dining room that was made of walnut) of the panelling, the tapestries of Aubusson, carpets, statues and curtains of the mansion.

== Renovations and Restorations ==
In 1977 works were carried out to adapt the chapel for public functions and it was dedicated to Our Lady of Aparecida, patron saint of Brazil. In 1989 the Sert's oil paintings were carefully repaired and neatly renovated by Mr. Domingo Tellechea, founder of the "Argentinian Center for Restoration", and Director of the "Technical Restoration Institute of Brazil", in São Paulo.

In 1995 expert reports are made for the subsequent integral restoration of the exterior of the palace. The works begin in 1998 with the complete restoration of the main façade and, later in the same year, continue with the rear façade of the building. To finish in 1999 with the restoration of the plastering of the access (Integral Project: Arq.^{os} Báez, Carena & Grementieri; Implementation: Leguizamón, Escurra & Asoc.)

During 2010 and 2011 the restoration and renovation of the interior of the palace (residence of the ambassador and reception halls) was carried out under the orders of the Estudio Ing. Villa S.R.L. (Integral project and work of the same team that made the exterior).
