= Vittorio Meano =

Italian architect

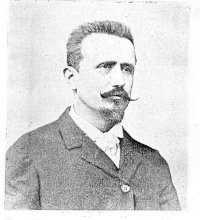
- Born: Vittorio Meano; 2 April 1860; Gravere, Val di Susa, Piedmont, Kingdom of Sardinia
- Died: 1 June 1904 (aged 44); Buenos Aires, Argentina
- Occupation: Architect
- Buildings: Palace of the Argentine National Congress, Columbus Theatre, Legislative Palace of Uruguay
- Projects: Palace of the Argentine National Congress, Columbus Theatre, Legislative Palace of Uruguay
- Design: Palace of the Argentine National Congress, Legislative Palace of Uruguay

Vittorio Meano (1860, Gravere, Kingdom of Sardinia – 1904, Buenos Aires, Argentina) was an Italian architect born in Gravere, Val di Susa, Piedmont, Kingdom of Sardinia.

== Background and early career ==
He studied architecture in Albertina Academy in Turin, Kingdom of Italy.

In 1884 he arrived in Argentina to work in the studio of the Italian architect Francesco Tamburini, who at that time was involved in a number of major public works, including the enlargement and renovation of the Casa Rosada.

== Buenos Aires: work on Teatro Colón and Argentine National Congress ==
They worked together on the new building for the Teatro Colón until the death of Tamburini in 1890, after which Meano took charge of the project.

After winning the competition for the design of the Argentine National Congress building in 1895, he became entirely absorbed with these two great public works.

== Montevideo: work on Legislative Palace ==
In 1904, Meano won an international competition to design the Palacio Legislativo in Montevideo, Uruguay.

=== Death ===
On 1 June 1904, Meano returned to his residence, finding his wife in bed with a man named Giovanni Passera. A few minutes later, he died of a gunshot wound, screaming, "They murdered me!" Passera was sentenced to seventeen years' imprisonment, and Meano's wife was deported to Italy.

Works by Vittorio Meano
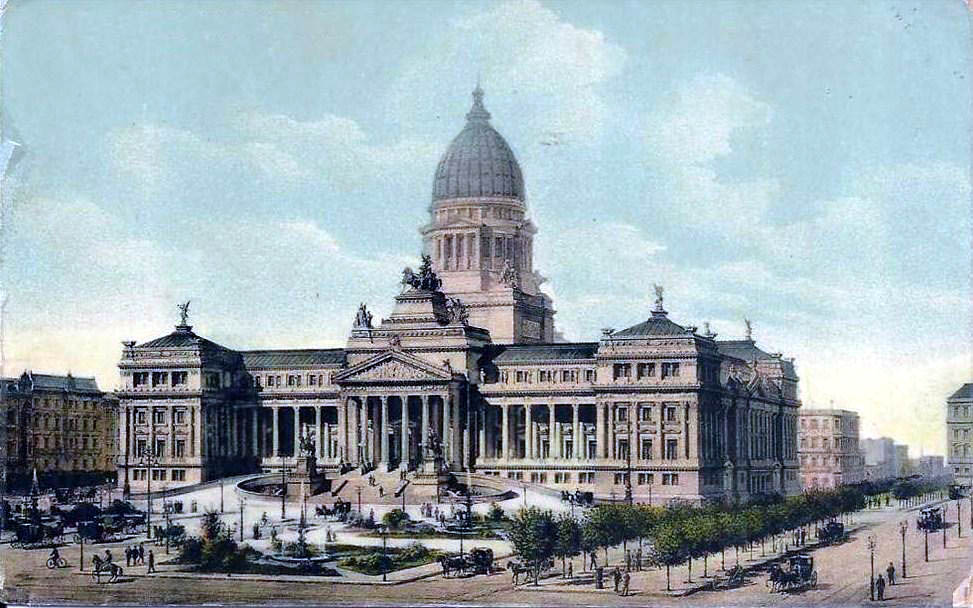
Congreso Nacional Argentina - 1896

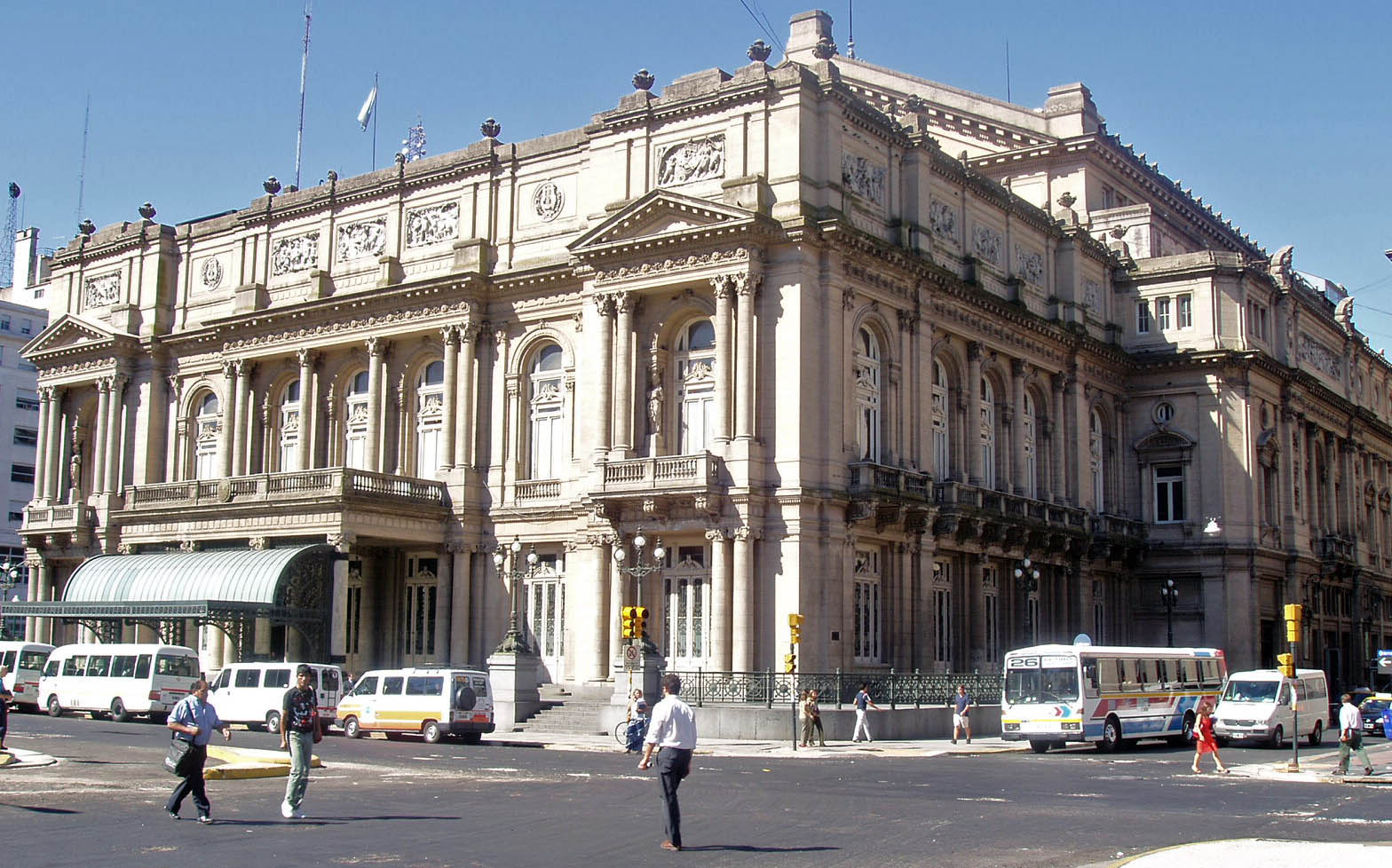
Colón Theater, Buenos Aires, by Tamburini, Meano and Dormal

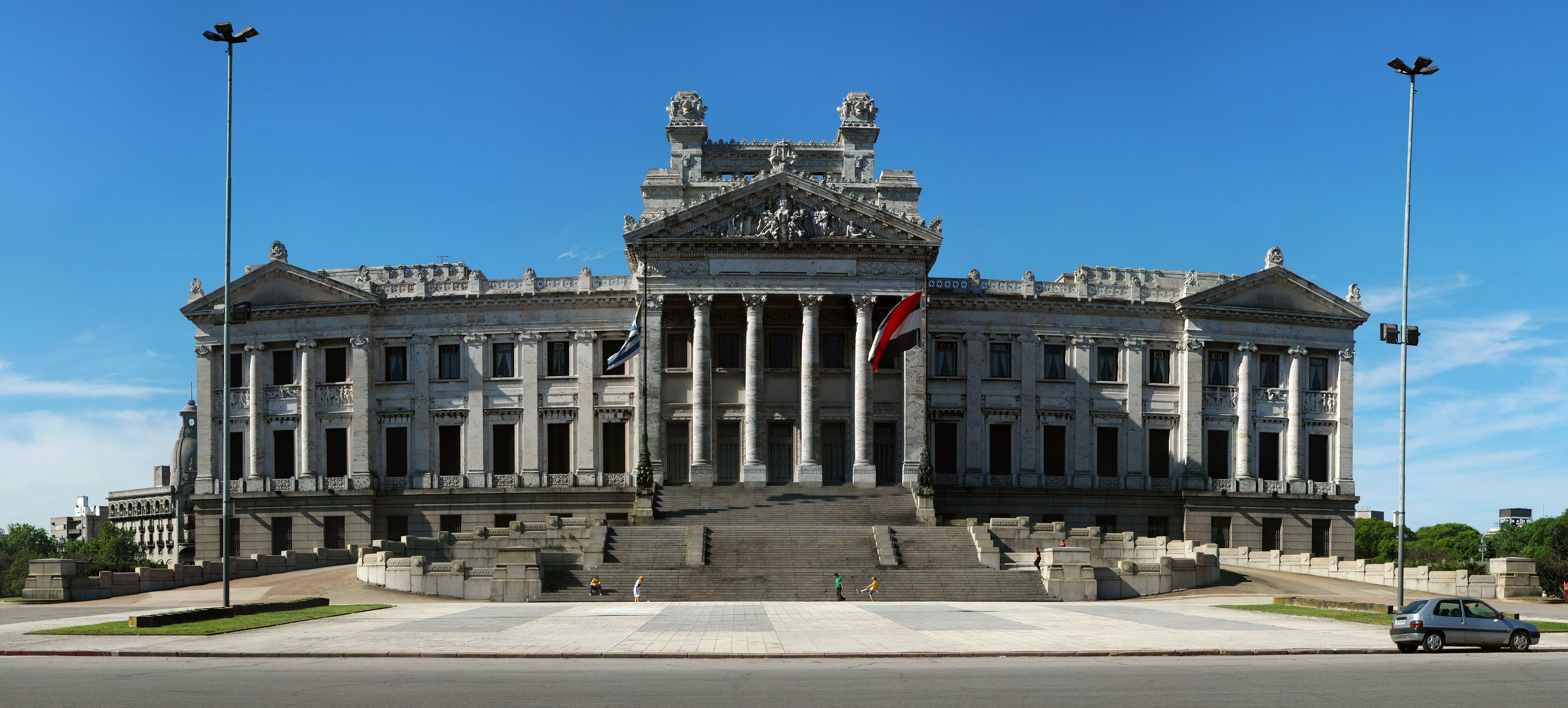
Legislative Palace, Montevideo
