= Victor de Pol =

Italian-Argentinian sculptor and medallist (1865–1925)

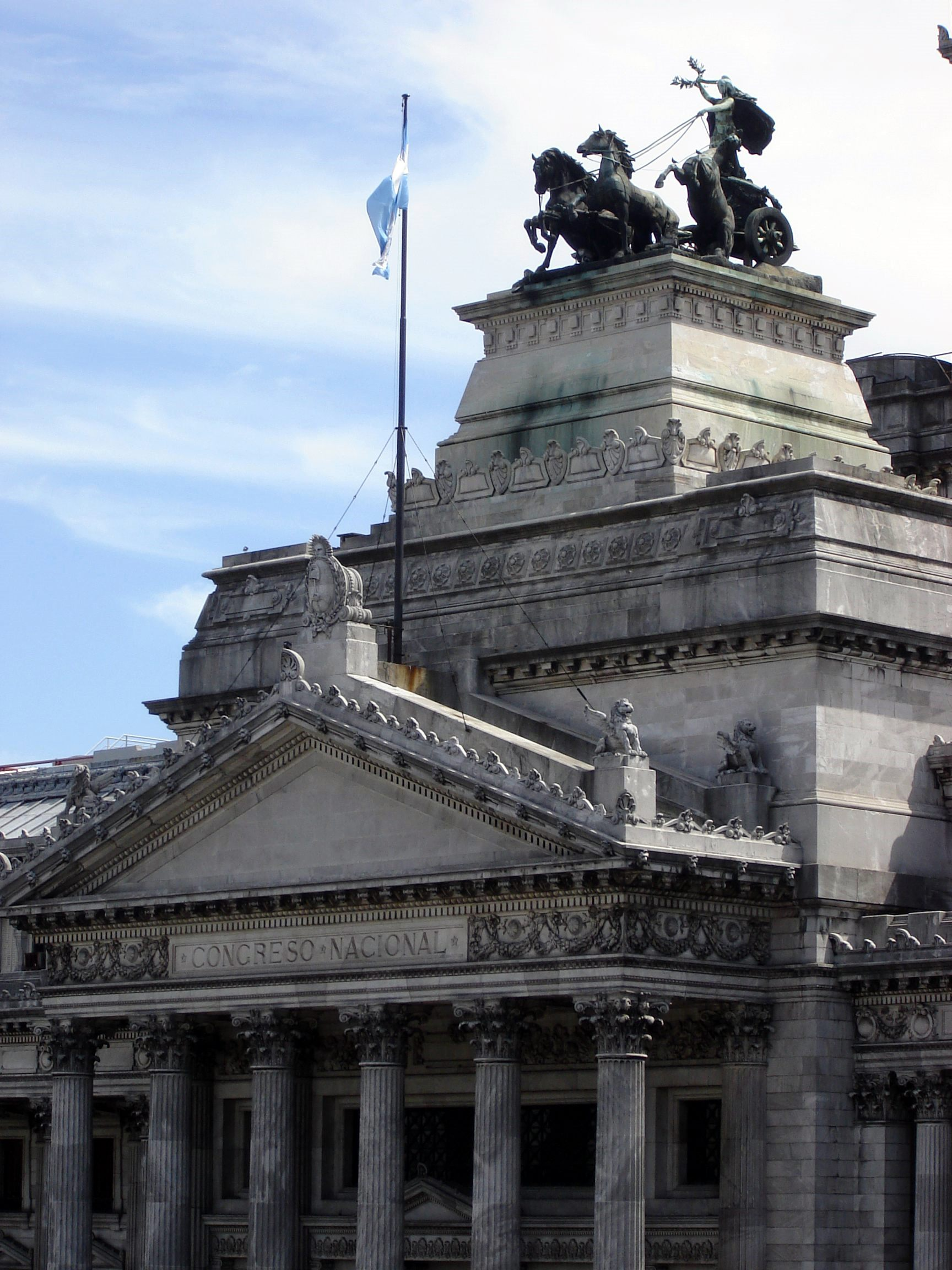
Quadriga atop the Argentine National Congress, Buenos Aires

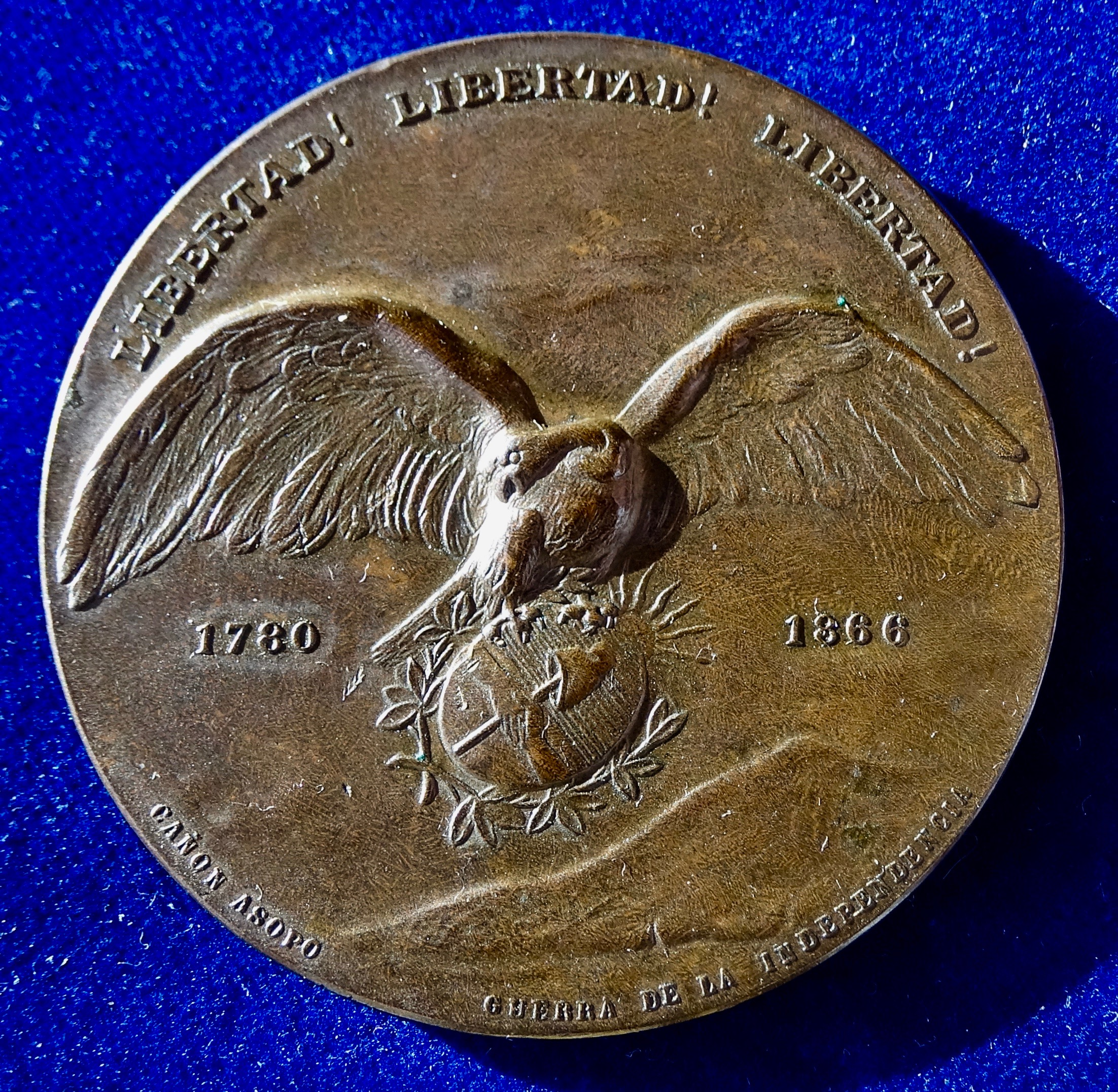
Argentine Art Nouveau Medal 1906 by Victor de Pol, Repatriation of the remains of National Hero Las Heras, obverse.

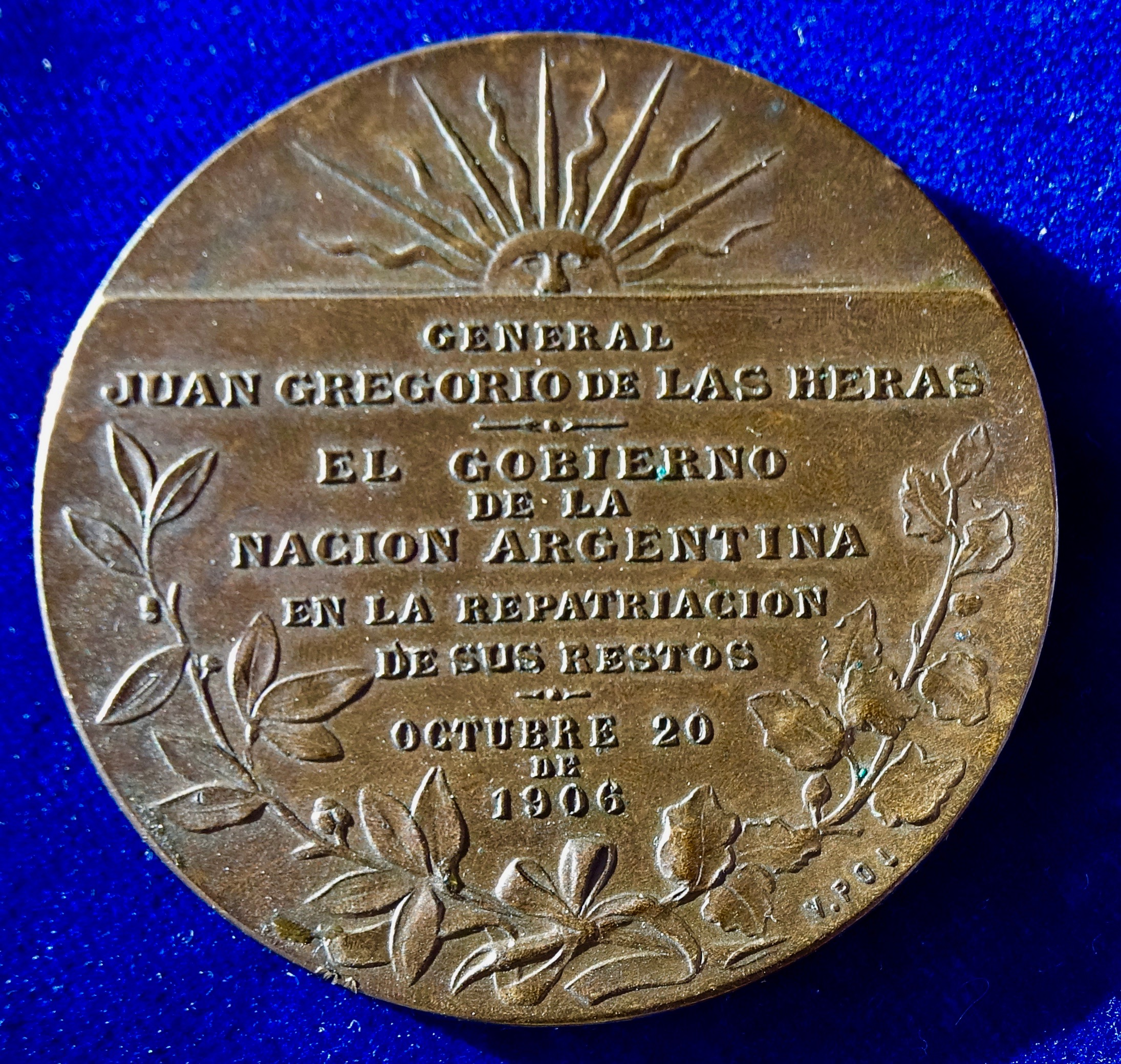
The reverse of this medal.

Victor de Pol (1865 - 1925) was an Italian sculptor and medallist most active in Buenos Aires, Argentina.

Born in Venice, de Pol was a student of Giulio Monteverde. (Monteverde was also the mentor to Argentine sculptor Lola Mora.) He immigrated to Argentina at the age of 22 and participated in the development of La Plata, designing Beaux-Arts-style sculpture for major public buildings. At least judging from his commissions related to President Domingo Faustino Sarmiento, de Pol was socially well-connected.

From 1890 through 1895 de Pol returned to Europe. His return to Argentina brought the major work of his career, the 8-meter, 20-ton heroic quadriga on the Argentine National Congress building, c. 1906.

He is buried in La Recoleta Cemetery in the family vault of Aristóbulo del Valle, the great-uncle of de Pol's wife Asimilda del Valle.

== Work ==
- bust of President Sarmiento, at the Sarmiento Museum, circa 1887
- sculpture of a condor atop a pylon at the tomb of Sarmiento, designed by Sarmiento himself, at La Recoleta Cemetery, 1888
- twelve facade busts of scientists, and the two sabertoothed Smilodon flanking the entrance to the La Plata Museum, 1888
- quadriga at the Argentine National Congress, circa 1906
- tomb of Archbishop León Federico Aneiros, Archbishop of Buenos Aires, inside the Buenos Aires Metropolitan Cathedral

== Sources ==
- online biography
