= Jewish Social Democratic Labour Organization in Argentina (Avangard) =

Political organization in Argentina

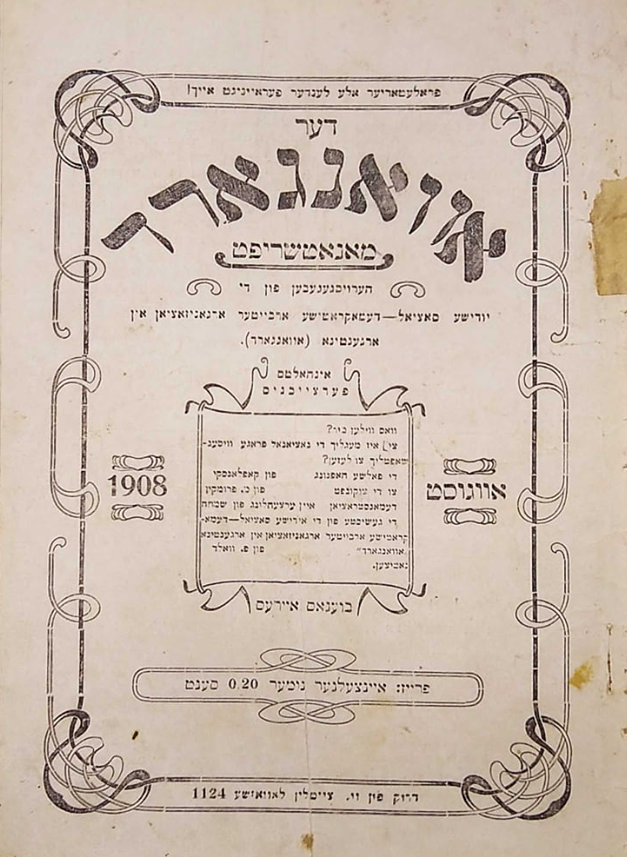
Cover of Der Avangard, August 1908 issue

The Jewish Social Democratic Labour Organization in Argentina (Avangard) (Yiddish: יידישע סאציאל-דעמאקראטישע ארבייטער ארגאניזאציאן אין ארגענטינא (אוואנגארד), Yidishe sotsyal-demokratishe arbeyter organisatsyon in argentina (avangard)) was a Jewish socialist organization in Argentina. Avangard was founded on January 20, 1907, by a group of Jewish socialists inspired by the General Jewish Labour Bund in Lithuania, Poland and Russia. The organization had its office on Mexico 2070, Buenos Aires.

== History ==
During its early phase there was a Russian-speaking assimilationist faction within Avangard, the iskravets group (named after the Russian publication Iskra). In 1908 the iskravets faction broke away from Avangard and founded their own organization, Tsenter Avangard, which was integrated with the Socialist Party as its Yiddish-language propaganda unit. Avangard and Tsenter Avangard fought over the control of the erstwhile Avangard library. Key figures of the bundist Avangard after the split were Pinie Wald, S. Kaplansky, A. Epshteyn and M. Mas.

In August 1908 the group began publishing the monthly Der Avangard ('The Vanguard'). During this the period of 1908–1910 Der Avangard mainly re-published Bundist materials coming from the Bund Foreign Committee in Geneva. Contributors to Der Avangard included M. Olguin, Hersz Libman, A. Litvak, I. Salutzky and D. Pinski. The monthly publishing of Der Avangard was discontinued in December 1909. Der Avangard was again published February–May 1910. In 1910 all the socialist organization in Argentina were forced to suspend their activities under the State of Siege announced during the Argentina Centennial, including Avangard that hibernated for half a year.

Avangard sought to organize Jewish workers in trade unions, either in general unions together with Christian workers or in explicitly Jewish unions (such as Jewish unions of bakers and cap makers). The organization struggled against the Residence Law (or Cané Law) and the Social Order Law. Politically it was close to the Socialist Party, but the anti-nationalist postures of Avangard caused frictions with the party. The organization also organized Yiddish-language cultural and education activities. In 1912 the library of Avangard merged with the library of the Unión General de Obreros Israelitas, creating Biblioteca Progreso.

Der Avangard resumed publishing in January 1916 (first with S. Kaplansky as its editor and later Pinie Wald), and continued to be published until 1920.

During Tragic Week in 1919, the Argentine Patriotic League attacked Avangard and other supposed 'Jewish maximalist' groups. The Avangard library on Ecuador 359 in Buenos Aires was burnt by the mob. Leon (Leibl) Futaievsky, an Avangard member, was killed Pinie Wald was detained. Under torture Wald was forced to confess a supposed plot to install a Soviet regime in Argentina.

In 1920 Avangard was divided into two; a communist majority faction and a socialist minority faction. The communist faction aligned with the International Socialist Party in mid-1920, eventually becoming the Jewish section of the Communist Party of Argentina in 1921. The socialist faction of Avangard was refounded as the General Jewish Labour Bund.
