= Tsenter Avangard =

Political organization in Argentina

Tsenter Avangard (Yiddish: צענטער אַוואַנגאַרד, 'Vanguard Centre') or, in Spanish language, Centro Avangard, was a Jewish socialist organization in Argentina (1908–1914).

== History ==
The Tsenter Avangard emerged from a split in the Jewish Social Democratic Labour Organization in Argentina (Avangard), a Bundist group. The founders of Tsenter Avangard were known as the iskrovzes faction, a name inspired by the Russian publication Iskra. They were Russian speakers and had an assimilationist approach in contrast to the Yiddishkayt line of the Bundists. In March 1908, the iskrovzes founded the 'Russian Circle'. The Russian Circle was admitted as a language propaganda unit in the Socialist Party under the name Centro Avangard. During the split in Avangard, the two factions fought over control of the library of the organization.

Key figures of Tsenter Avangard were A. Bondarev and Y. Sheyner. Tsenter Avangard published Di shtime fun Avangard (Yiddish: די שטימע פון אַוואַנגאַרד, 'Voice of the Vanguard') as its organ 1908–1910.

Tsenter Avangard was rendered largely defunct under the state of siege of the 1910 Argentina Centennial.

In 1914 the Socialist Party closed down the Tsenter Avangard and its other language centres. The iskrovzes tendency continued to operate however, publishing the periodical Golos Avangard.
