= Without Bread and Without Work =

Argentinian painting

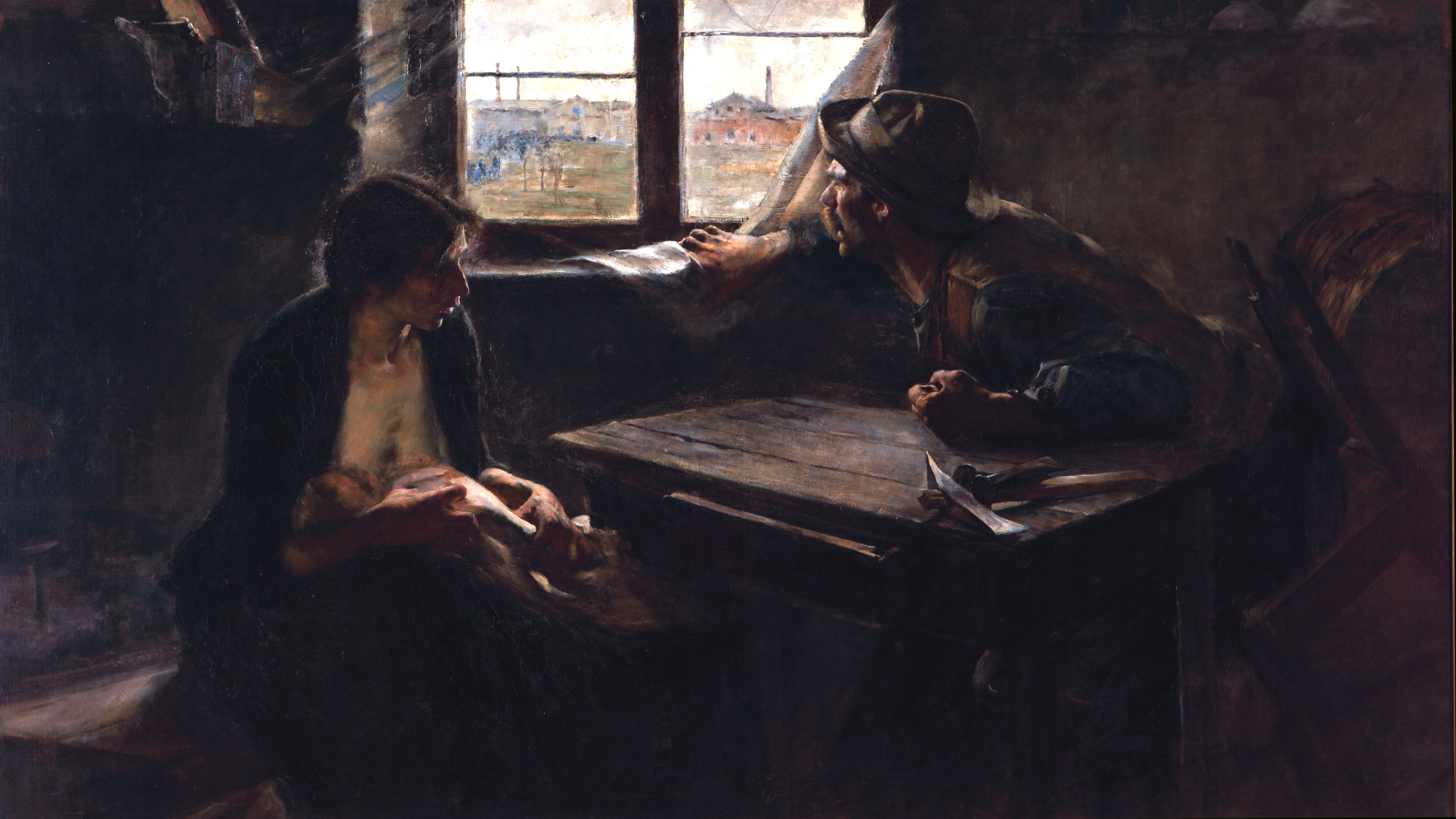
Sin pan y sin trabajo (1892–1894) by Ernesto de la Cárcova.

Without Bread and Without Work or Sin pan y sin trabajo, is a realist oil-on-canvas painting by Argentine artist Ernesto de la Cárcova. De la Cárcova finished it in 1894, making it the first major painting in Argentine history to portray social issues. The artwork measures 125,5 centimeters in width and 216 centimeters in height. By the time it was painted, De la Cárcova was affiliated with the Centro Obrero Socialista, which was the predecessor of the Socialist Party of Argentina founded two years later.

The first public display of the painting was in the Segundo salón del Ateneo de Buenos Aires of 1894. In 1904 it was selected by Eduardo Schiaffino to be sent to the St. Louis World Fair, where it won the Grand Prize and was featured in several newspapers.

Since 1906 the artwork is exhibited in the National Museum of Fine Arts of Buenos Aires.

Former Argentine President Cristina Fernández de Kirchner claimed during a speech that it was her favorite painting.

== Historical context ==
In the late 19th century, Argentina was going through significant economic growth due to the expansion of the exports of grain, wool, meat and leather from the country, while large waves of european immigrants arrived in the port of Buenos Aires, specially from Italy and Spain. Despite the rapid growth, Argentine society was unequal and Argentine workers would not have basic labor rights up until the 1940s.

The growing socialist movement participated in several protests, which were violently cracked down and caused numerous casualties all over Argentina. Such as the Tragic Week, the Patagonia Rebelde and La Forestal Massacre.

in 1890 the Baring crisis occurred, which sparked a major recession in Argentina, leading to mass unemployment. The recession led to political turmoil and there was an attempt of seizing the government, which would be remembered as the Revolution of the Park. Although it was unsuccessful, it led to the resignation of President Miguel Juárez Celman.

== Political relevance in the present ==
Argentine right-wing politicians have historically claimed that Argentina reached its peak development in the late 19th century and early 20th century, such as President Javier Milei, who said many times that Argentina should "go back to the Centenario". For this reason, in September 2024, former President Cristina Fernández de Kirchner said that Milei should go to the National Museum of Fine Arts to see the painting and learn more about the harsh lives of the workers in that time period.

== See also ==
- Generation of '80
- Great European immigration wave to Argentina
- History of Argentina
