= Ernesto de la Cárcova Museum of Reproductions and Comparative Sculpture =

Coordinates: 34°37′10″S 58°21′26″W

- Museo de Calcos y Escultura comparada Ernesto de la Cárcova
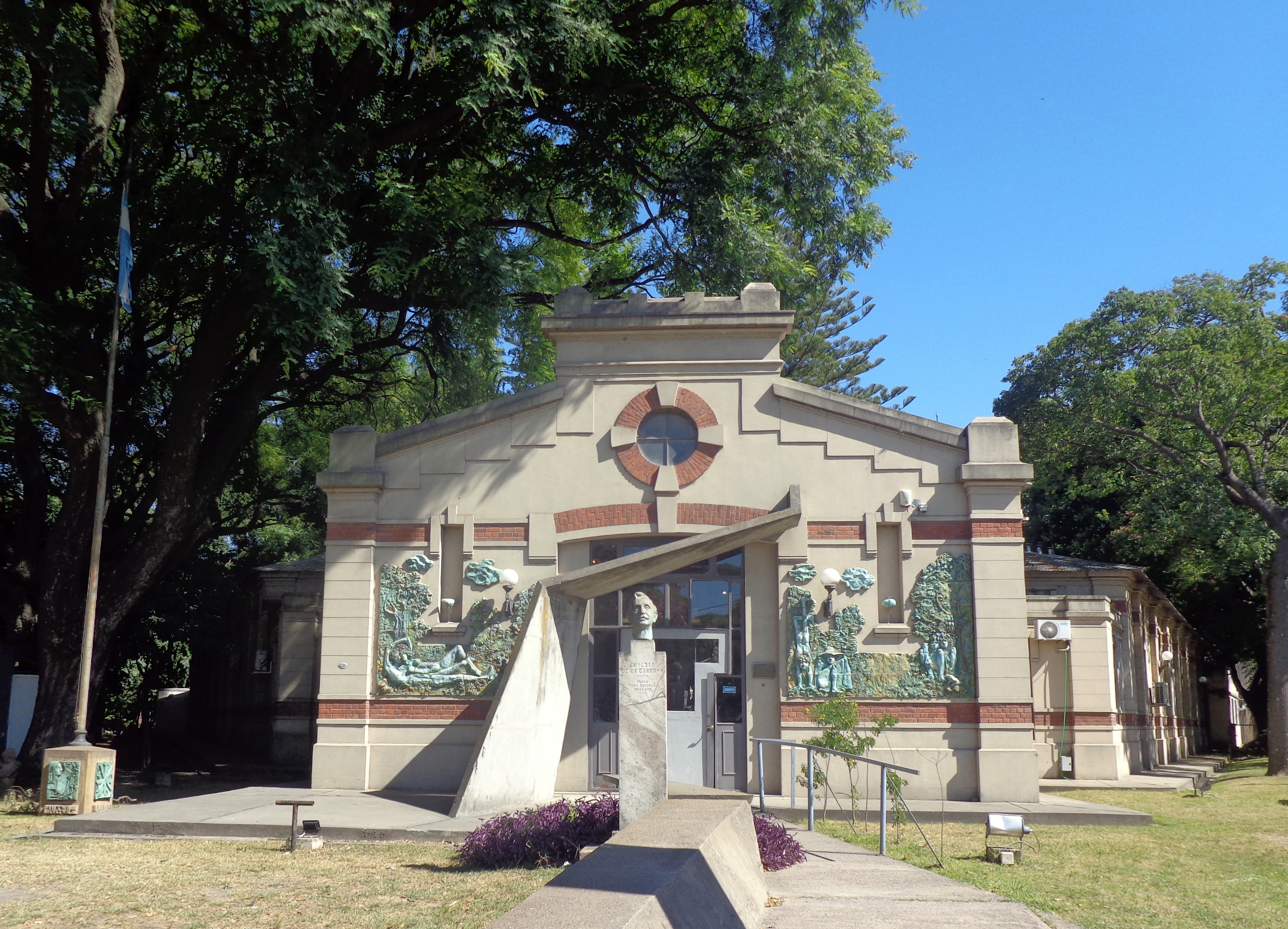
- Facade of the museum as of 2019
- Established: 1928; 98 years ago
- Location: Av. España 1701; Buenos Aires, Argentina
- Director: Carlos Molina
- Website: museodelacarcova.una.edu.ar

The Ernesto de la Cárcova Museum of Reproductions and Comparative Sculpture is located in the Puerto Madero ward of Buenos Aires, and is administered by the National University of Arts.

== Overview ==
The museum originated with a collection of reproductions purchased by painter Ernesto de la Cárcova in Berlin from 1905 to 1908. Most of these reproductions were based on works on display at the Berlin State Museums, including those of a number of ancient Egyptian, Chaldean, and Greek busts and bronzes. Returning to Buenos Aires, he displayed a number of these works at the Buenos Aires Centennial Exposition of 1910.

For nine decades, part of the museum and its adjacent buildings housed the post-graduate school of fine arts (Escuela Superior de Bellas Artes, Ernesto de la Cárcova). One of its kind in Argentina, this was a prestigious academic institution with a four-year post graduate programme in Sculpture, Painting, Printmaking and Mural Crafts. Several influential Argentine artists and art professors have been graduates of this school.

Professor de la Cárcova would be appointed the first President of the National School of Fine Arts in 1921, and from 1923 to 1927, bequeathed his collection of German sculptures for the creation of the Museum of Reproductions and Comparative Sculpture. The National School of Fine Arts purchased a block of buildings in the eastern section of Puerto Madero for its use. These buildings were originally built around 1900 for use as the Lazareto stables, a municipal agency that was responsible for the control of imported horses entering through the Port of Buenos Aires. They were refurbished for their new purpose in 1923, and with the support of the National Commission of Fine Arts, the Museum of Reproductions and Comparative Sculpture was named in honor of the academic responsible for its creation, and inaugurated at the site in 1928.

The largest single subsequent donation to the museum would be the approximately two hundred casts of Egyptian and Mesopotamian figures ceded in 1935 by the Juan B. Ambrosetti Museum of Ethnography. The museum was conceived as much for a didactic purpose as it was to exhibit its large collections, and many of its later works would be created by students in the College of Fine Arts. This latter institution, and the museum, were absorbed into the new National University of Arts in 1996.

== Collections ==
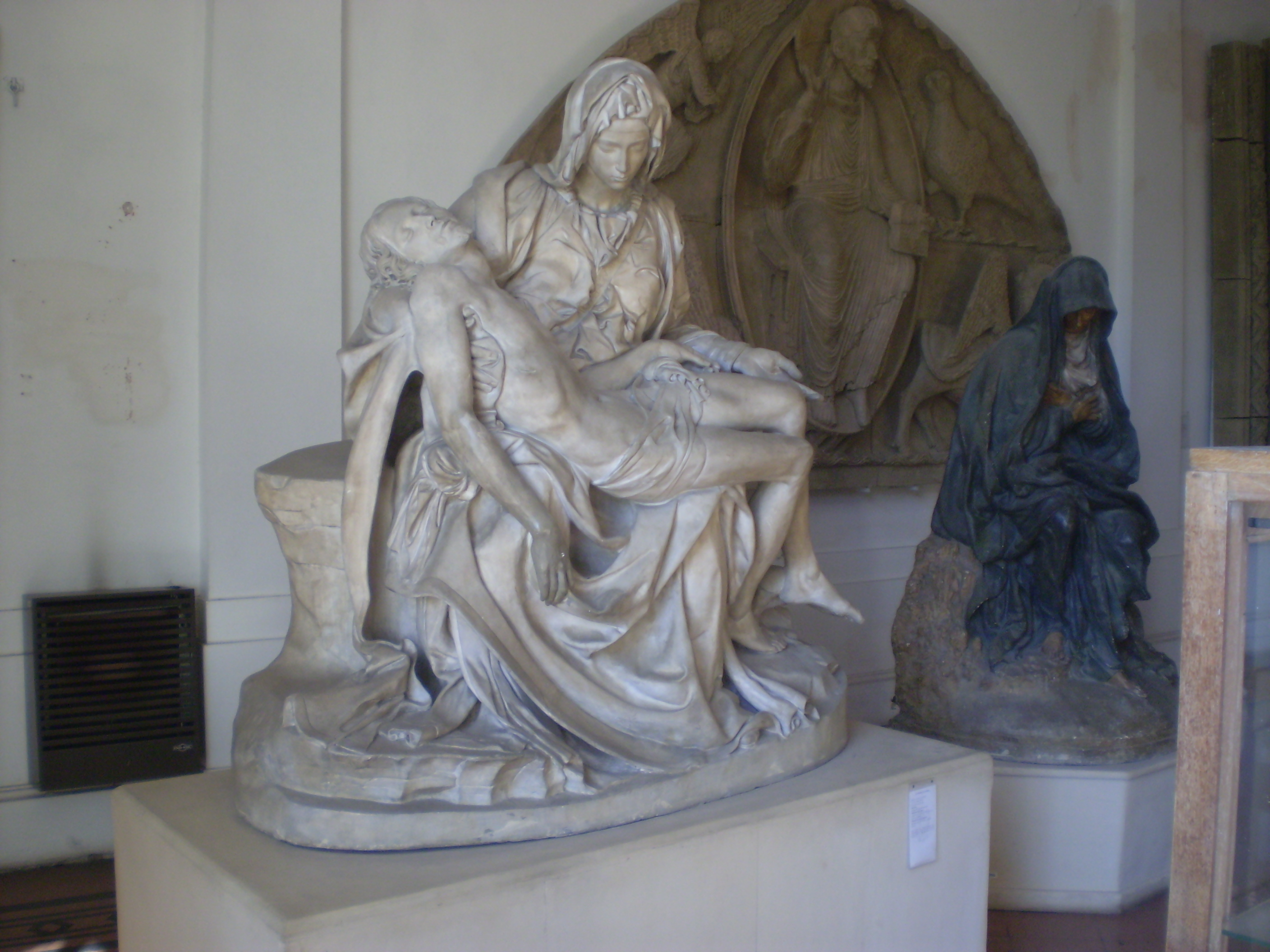
La Pietà

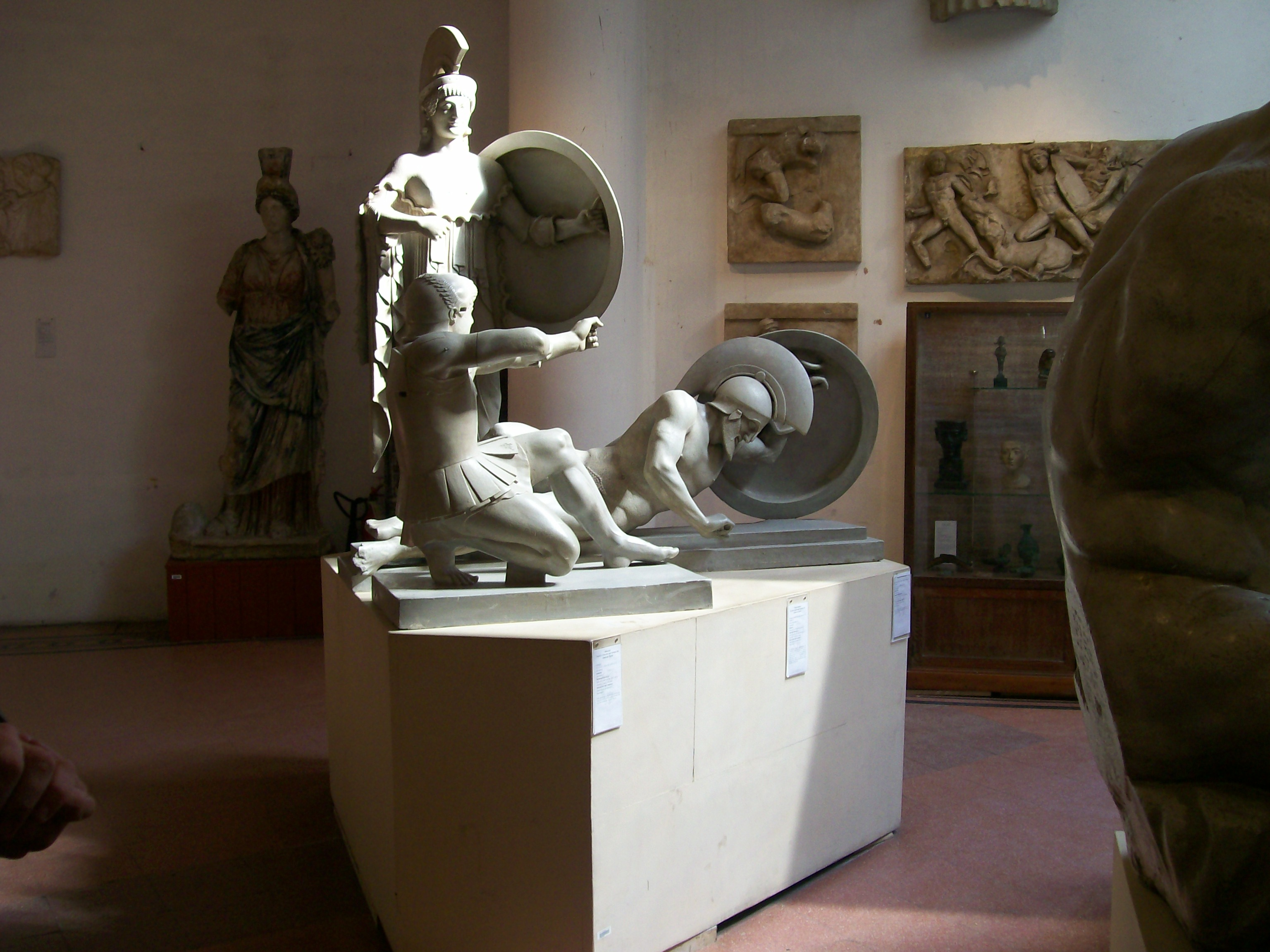
Hellenic Art

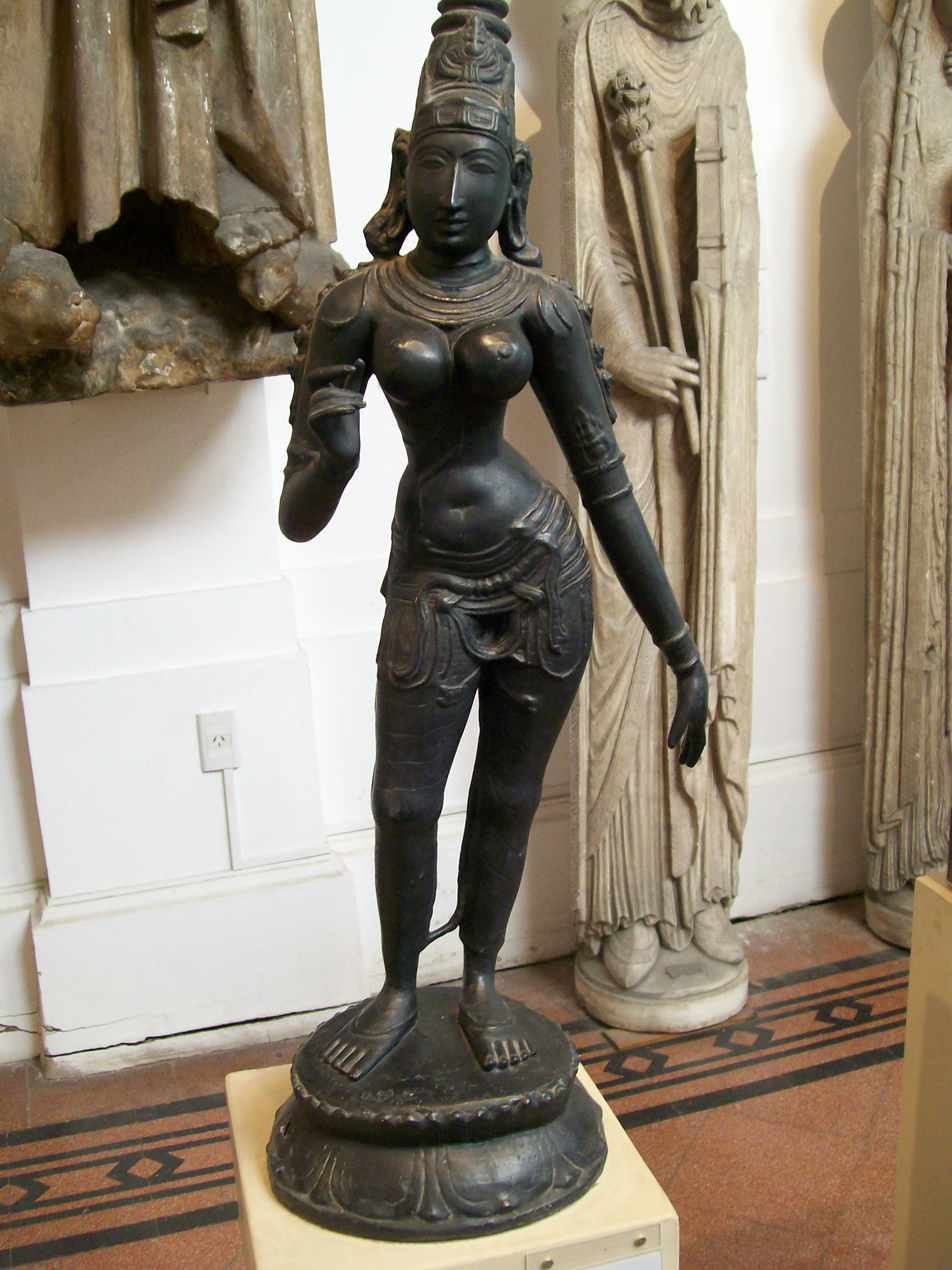
Shiva Nataraja

The oldest and most important of type in Latin America, the museum includes over 700 sculptures, all replicas of the originals made by die casting or copied from a mold taken from the original. Many are "first castings" of original works in the Berlin State Museums, the British Museum, the Louvre, or L'Accademia, Florence. The museum also maintains a library and an art print collection displaying works by artists trained at the institution.

=== Hall One ===
- Reproductions of works by Michelangelo include "David", the "Moses" and a sculpture of Lorenzo de Medici ("Il Pensieroso") and two representations of the Virgin Mary: "Pietà" and "Dolorosa Madonna", among others.
- Two fragments of the Cathedral of Chartres, representing "Jesus and the four Evangelists" and the "King of Judea."
- Two examples of Gothic architecture: "The Smiling Angel" (Reims Cathedral) and "Beau Dieu" (Amiens Cathedral).
- Polychrome reliefs by Andrea della Robbia, "The Annunciation".

=== Hall Two ===
- Hellenistic art: the "Winged Victory of Samothrace", the Belvedere Torso, and the renowned "Venus de Milo."
- Sculptures located in the Parthenon: "Aphrodite and Dione", the "Ilissos" caryatid, and the Erechtheion. Reproductions of friezes, in addition.
- Art of Ancient Egypt, notably the sculptures of Nefertiti and Princess Meritaten Tasherit.

=== Hall Three ===
- Ancient Egyptian art: "Dersenez the Scribe" or the Dendera Zodiac (relief of the Theban period)
- Assyrian art: the "Resting Lion" or the bas-relief "Wornded Lioness"
- Indian art:, "Prajnaparamita" (relief of a figure in a lotus position, from Java), sculpture of "Nataraja" (Hindu god) and a Buddha head.
- Pre-Columbian art: the "Queen of Uxmal," a Mayan architectural ornament, the "Red Jaguar" (Chichen Itza), the "Head of Coyolxauhqui" (Aztec goddess of the moon), basalt "Teocalli", and an Inca sculpture ("Huaylas, Ancash."
