= Eduardo Arnosi =

Argentine writer on classical music (1924–2012)

Eduardo Arnosi (November 6, 1924 in Buenos Aires, Argentina – December 23, 2012) was an Argentine music critic, writer on music, and academic. He wrote articles on opera and classical music for the newspapers El Mundo and La Nación; notably penning an article in the latter publication on the Teatro Colón debuts of Maria Callas and Mario Del Monaco made in a 1949 production of Puccini's Turandot. For three decades he contributed articles about opera in Argentina to the magazines Opera News and Opera.

Arnosi penned several books on opera, including biographies on Titta Ruffo (Titta Ruffo: el titán de los baritones, Ediciones Ayer y Hoy de la Opera, 1977), Lauritz Melchior (Lauritz Melchior, el coloso wagneriano, Ars Lyrica, 1994), Claudia Muzio (Claudia Muzio, la única: en el cincuentenario de su muerte, Ars Lyrica, 1986), Beniamino Gigli and Julián Gayarre. In addition to writing, he taught for many years at the Instituto Universitario Nacional del Arte and had a twenty-year career hosting a variety of radio programs in Argentina.
