= Copyright law of Argentina =

The basic copyright law of Argentina is Law No. 11.723 of September 28, 1933, on Legal Intellectual Property Regime (Copyright Law, as last amended by Law No. 26.570 of November 25, 2009).

== History ==
Copyright law in Argentina was first introduced by the 1853 Constitution of Argentina. The article 17º states that "Every author or inventor is the exclusive owner of his work, invention or discovery, for the term granted by law". Juan Bautista Alberdi intended for the copyright term to be indefinite, but during the writing of the Constitution it was decided to give a time limit, as done in Chile and the United States. The enactment of the Constitution was followed by the Law 111, but it was a patent law and had no mention to artistic works. However, despite the lack of a specific copyright law, jurisprudence would usually still grant copyright protection based in the Constitutional article alone. For example, there was a trial about an unauthorized edition of José Hernández's Martín Fierro, where the civil justice of Buenos Aires considered the 17º article fully operative.

During the Argentina Centennial the French G. Clemenceau learned that one of his theater plays was being played without authorization. After a dispute about the topic, the first copyright law was enacted in 1913. It was the 9.141 law. A new and more detailed copyright law would be enacted in 1933, the 11.723 law, which is still in force.

== Copyright terms ==
For most works, copyright lasts for the lifetime of the author, plus 70 years after the January 1 following his or her death (Art. 5). (Pseudo-)Anonymous works belonging to institutions, corporations, or legal entities are protected for 50 years after publication (Art. 8). Photographs are protected for 20 years after creation and 25 years after publication, and cinematographic works for the lifetime of the authors plus 50 additional years (Art. 34).For musical recordings, the copyright expires 70 years after publication.

== Right of publicity ==
Article 31 prohibits a photograph of a person from being put on the market (suggesting commercial use) without the express consent of the person in the photograph (or, if that person is dead, the consent of an immediate family member).
