= Universidad Nacional de las Artes =

University in Buenos Aires, Argentina

Coordinates: 34°35′41″S 58°23′58″W

National University of the Arts
- Universidad Nacional de las Artes
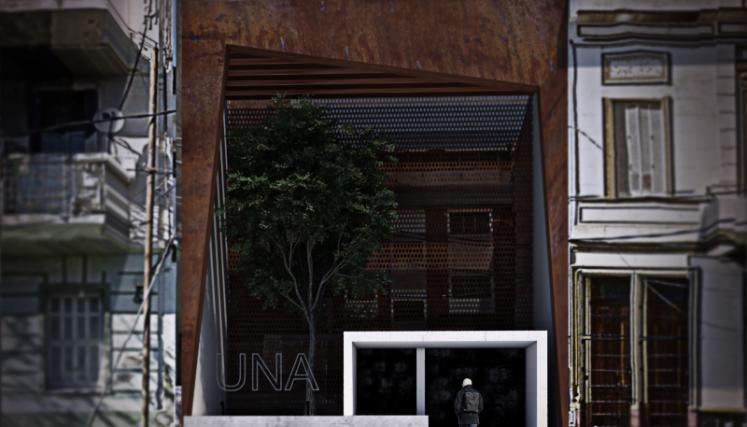
- Type: Public School of Fine Arts
- Established: In 1905 National Academy of Fine Arts, in 1932 named ESNA National Superior School of the Arts, in 1985 DNEA Dirección Nacional de Educación Artística, in 1996 renamed IUNA Instituto Universitario Nacional del Arte, in 2014 renamed UNA Universidad Nacional de las Artes.
- Rector: Sandra Torlucci
- Academic staff: 1,703
- Students: 16,806
- Location: Buenos Aires, Argentina
- Campus: Urban
- Website: una.edu.ar
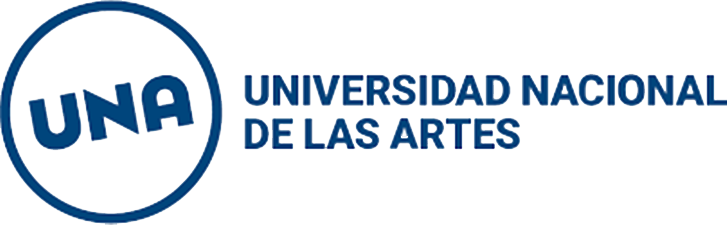

The National University of the Arts (Spanish: Universidad Nacional de las Artes) is an arts and research public university located in Buenos Aires, formerly known as IUNA - Instituto Universitario Nacional del Arte, is an Argentine university established in 1993 as a Collegiate University, based on the previous amalgamation in 1985 at the return to the Argentine democracy of the Arts Education Institutes of the City of Buenos Aires under the DNEA (Dirección Nacional de Educación Artística), National Directorate of Artistic Education and degrees accreditation by the University of Buenos Aires, of the incorporation of various national institutions dedicated to the teaching of fine arts, performing arts, and formation of Arts Educators, then renamed in 2014 under the name UNA Universidad Nacional de las Artes, Argentina (English: National University of the Arts, of Argentina).

== History ==
The origins of the current UNA University lay in the 1875 founding of the National Society of the Stimulus of the Arts by painters Eduardo Schiaffino, Eduardo Sívori, and others. Their guild was rechartered as the National Academy of Fine Arts in 1905 and, in 1923, on the initiative of painter and academic Ernesto de la Cárcova, as the Academy of Applied Arts in the University of Buenos Aires, since 1923 as the ESNA the National Superior School of the Arts.

The latter in 1927 created the Museum of Reproductions and Comparative Sculpture. In 1936 theatre director Antonio Cunill Cabanellas founded the National Institute of Theatrical Studies. These institutions of Performing Arts, including the Carlos López Buchardo National Conservatory of Music, the National Institute of Superior Education and Folklore, the María Ruanova National Institute of Superior Education and Dance, and the National Institutes of Liberal Arts Education, all united forming the new National University of the Arts, "Universidad Nacional de las Artes", issued in 1996 by Argentina's Ministry of Education.

== Departments ==
- Audiovisual Arts
- Dramatic Arts
- Kinetic Arts
- Music
- Visual Arts
- Art Criticism
- Folklore
- Multimedia
- Writing Arts
- Educators Program - Teacher Training
- Ernesto de la Cárcova Museum

The university UNA grants official degrees at the Argentine national level, with international validity, from bachelor's, master's, and doctorate in all areas of the arts and academic educators in Interdisciplinary arts.

== Notable alumni ==
- Eduardo Arnosi, music critic, radio personality, and writer on music
- Ángela Ragno, actress of theatre, film and television
