= Ernesto de la Cárcova =

Argentine painter

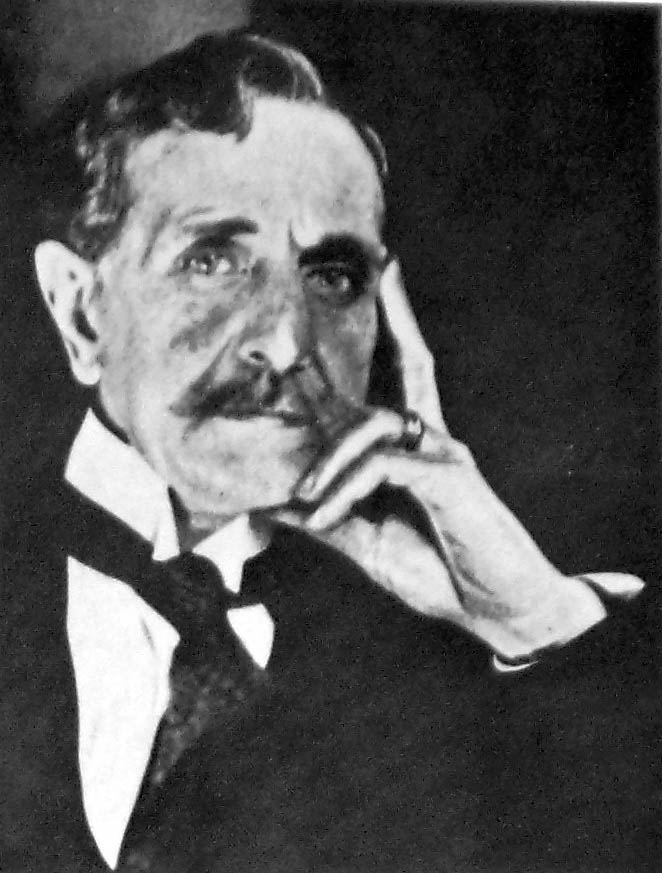
- Born: March 3, 1866; Buenos Aires, Argentina
- Died: December 28, 1927 (aged 61); Buenos Aires
- Known for: Painter
- Notable work: Without Bread and Without Work (1893)
- Movement: Realist
- Awards: Gold medal, Universal Exposition of 1904

Ernesto de la Cárcova y Arrotea (March 3, 1866 – December 28, 1927) was an Argentine painter of the Realist school.

== Life and work ==
Ernesto de la Cárcova was born in Buenos Aires, Argentina, in 1866. Taking an early interest in the canvas, he studied at the local Society for the Stimulus of Fine Arts under painter Francisco Romero. He attended the prestigious Accademia Albertina in Turin, where he was trained by painter Giacomo Grosso.

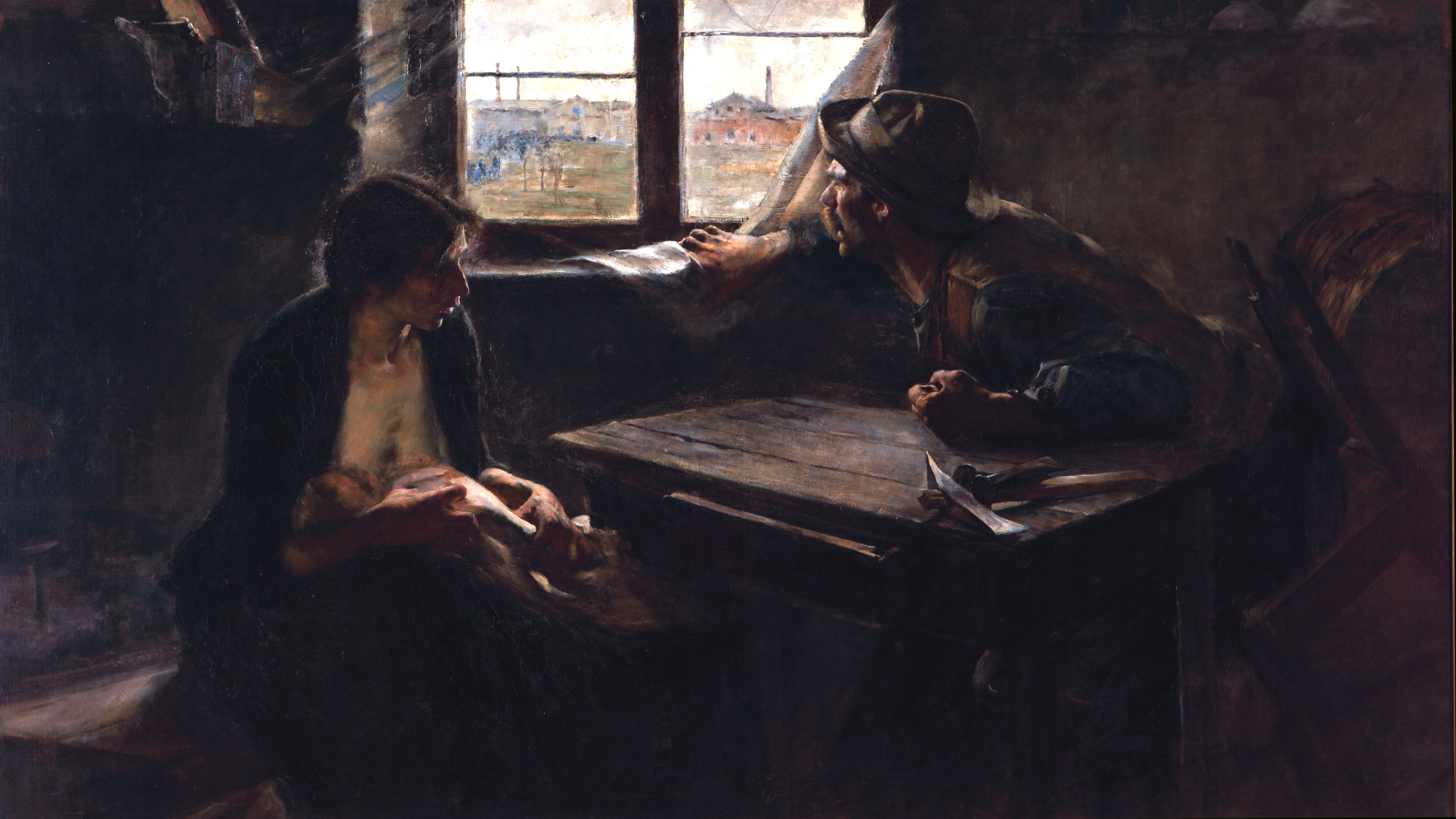
Without Bread or Work, oil on canvas, 1893.

At the 31st Turin Fine Arts Exposition in 1890, he presented The Head of An Old Man, a pastel drawing he sold to the King of Italy, Umberto I, for display at the Palazzo Quirinale in Rome. Returning to Argentina, he completed his best-known work, Without Bread and Without Work, in 1893. Set in Buenos Aires' industrial southside during the severe recession that followed the Panic of 1890, the work is today displayed in the National Museum of Fine Art.

Gaining increasing renown, he was invited to direct the Argentine Artists' Fellowship Program in Paris in 1902 and received a gold medal for his work at the Universal Exposition of 1904 in St. Louis (United States). During his stay in Europe, he took an interest in sculpture, purchasing a number of reproductions of works in the Berlin State Museums collections, including those of a number of ancient Egyptian, Chaldean, and Greek busts and bronzes. Returning to Buenos Aires, he displayed a number of these works at the Buenos Aires Centennial Exposition in 1910 and was invited into the National Fine Arts Academy by its founder, fellow Realist painter Eduardo Sívori.

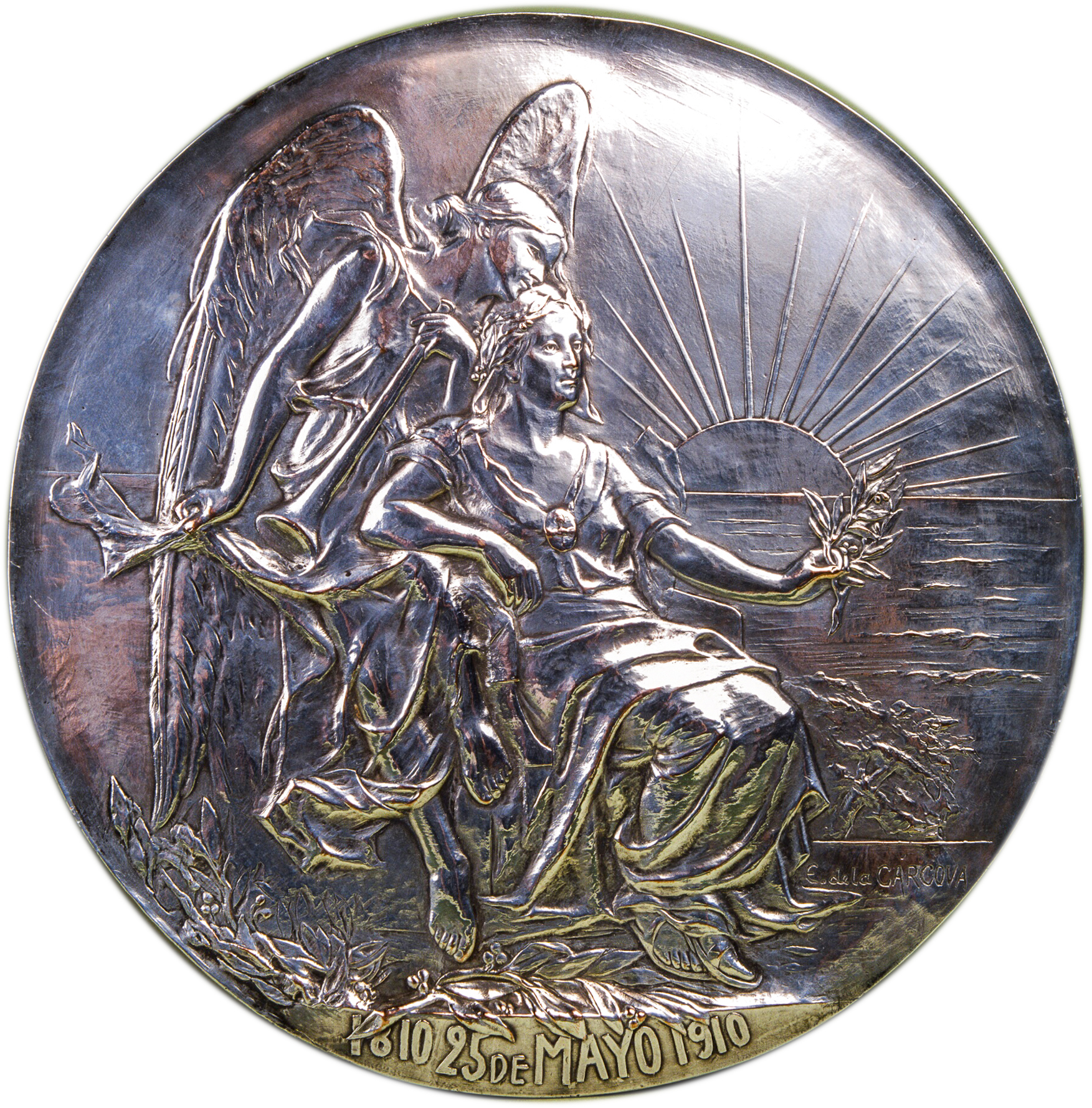
Seal created for the Argentine Centennial (1910)

He accepted a professorship at the University of Buenos Aires and, continuing to participate in international events, he garnered a silver medal at a 1916 Paris Arts Exposition. De la Cárcova's designs were chosen to represent the Argentine Centennial as the official medal, and as the great seal of the University of Buenos Aires in 1921. He was a founder of the School Superior of Fine Arts in 1923, an institution that absorbed Sívori's academy. The school is today part of the National University Art Institute, Argentina's foremost institution of its type.

Professor de la Cárcova bequeathed his collection of German sculptures for the creation of the Museum of Reproductions and Comparative Sculpture, which was named in his honor following his death in 1927. He was buried in La Recoleta Cemetery.
