= Argentina Centennial =

Centennial of the May Revolution in Argentina

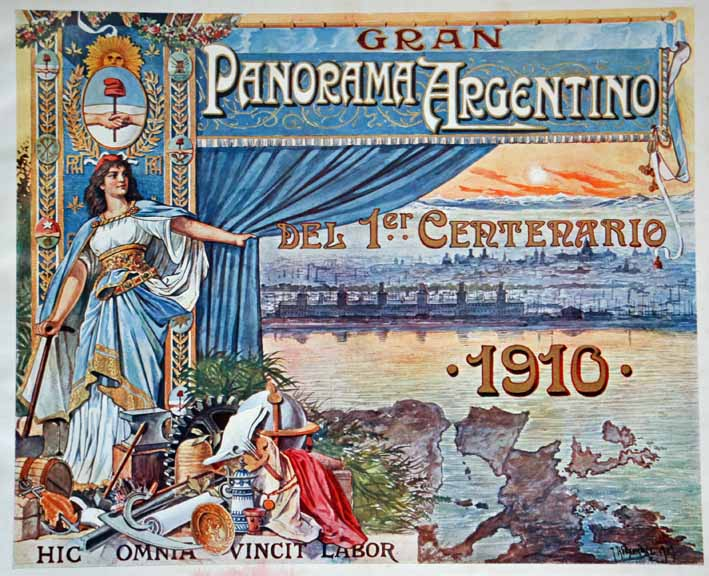
- Cover of Panorama Argentino magazine saluting the Centennial
- Native name: Centenario de Argentina
- Date: May 25, 1910
- Location: Argentina
- Type: 100th. Anniversary
- Theme: May Revolution
- Organised by: Government of Argentina

The Argentina Centennial was celebrated on May 25, 1910. It was the 100th anniversary of the May Revolution, when viceroy Baltasar Hidalgo de Cisneros was ousted from office and replaced with the Primera Junta, the first national government.

== Context ==
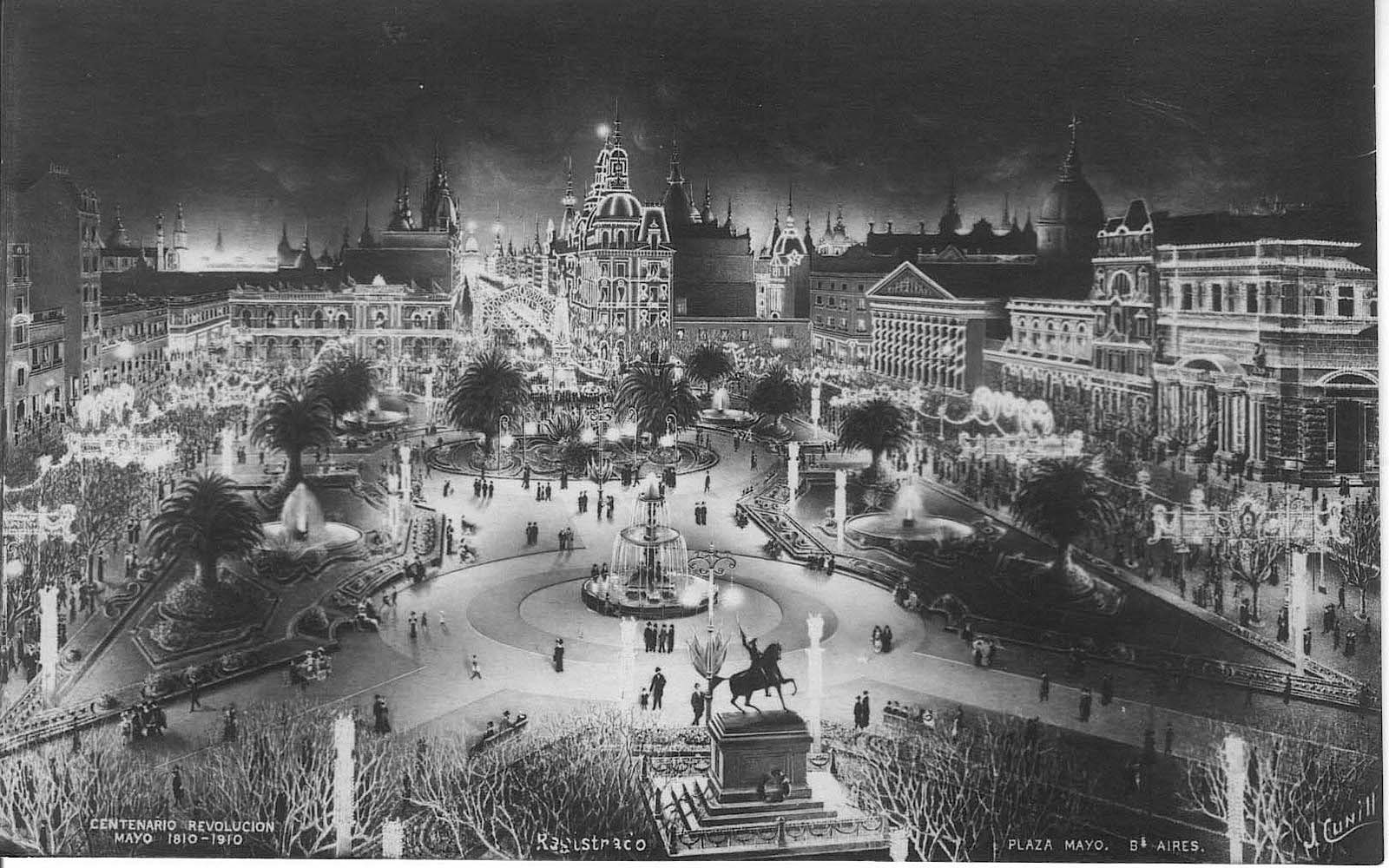
Postcard displaying Plaza de Mayo illuminated at night

The Centennial took place when Argentina was one of the richest countries in the world:

Argentina began the 20th century as one of the wealthiest places on the planet. In 1913, it was richer than France or Germany, almost twice as prosperous as Spain, and its per capita GDP was almost as high as that of Canada.

— Edward L. Glaeser, Rafael Di Tella, Lucas Llach, Introduction to Argentine exceptionalism

Argentina was known as "el granero del mundo" ("world's barn") due to its prosperous agriculture. The colloquial expression "¡Il est riche comme un Argentin!" ("Rich like an Argentine") referred to the extraordinary wealth of the Argentine landowning aristocracy in those years. In 1910 Argentina accounted for half of the Latin America's gross product.

Argentina's population grew quickly because of the immigration from Europe. Of 6 million inhabitants, 1 million were Italian and 800,000 were Spanish. A growing interest in improving democracy led to the sanction of the Sáenz Peña Law, two years later. The first Argentine copyright law was also enacted by this time, superseding a patent law that was being used so far for such topics.

The centennial had also an important impact on the historiography of Argentina. Because of the growing numbers of immigrants coming from very different places, it was felt that it was need to clearly define an "Argentine identity". Topics that had once canonic views, such as the wars of independence, started to be seen from multiple perspectives.

== Celebrations ==
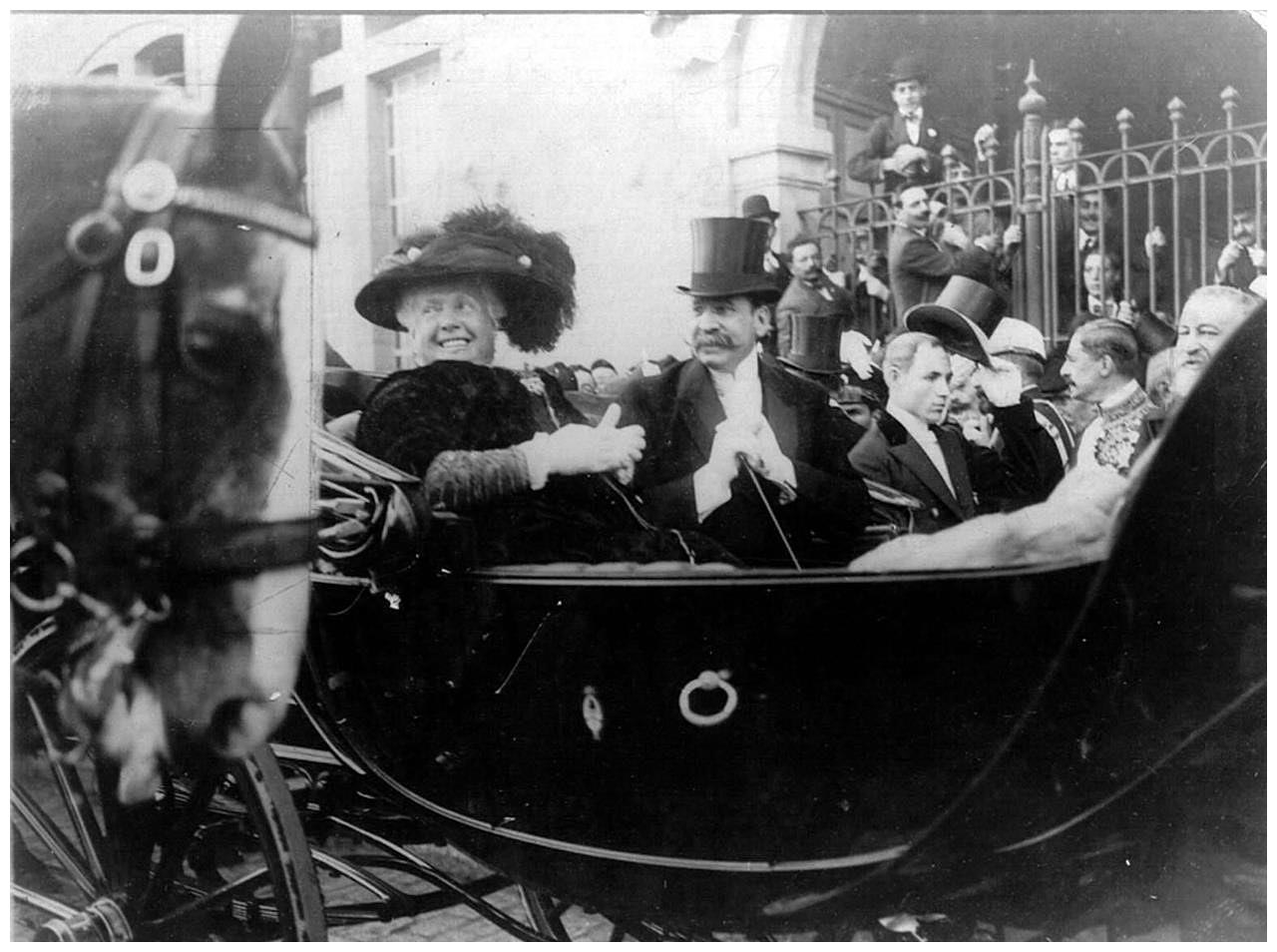
Infanta Isabella and President of Argentina José Figueroa Alcorta during the celebrations

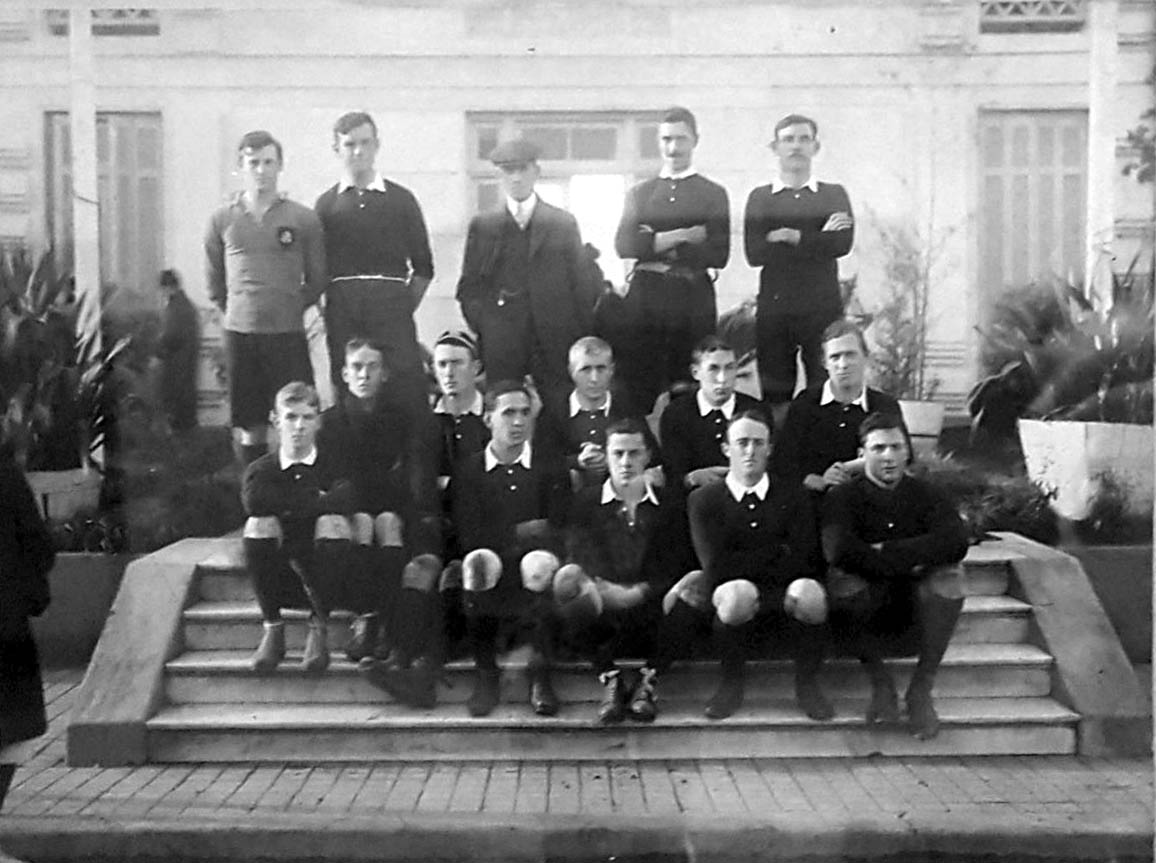
The Argentina national rugby union team before playing its first international v. the British Lions at Sociedad Sportiva Argentina, 12 June 1910

On February 8, 1909, the National Congress promulgated Law 6,286 that regulated the commemoration of the May Revolution. President of Argentina José Figueroa Alcorta decreed the state of siege under the celebrations were held. This was because some activists (led by anarchist movements) tried to boicot the celebrations.

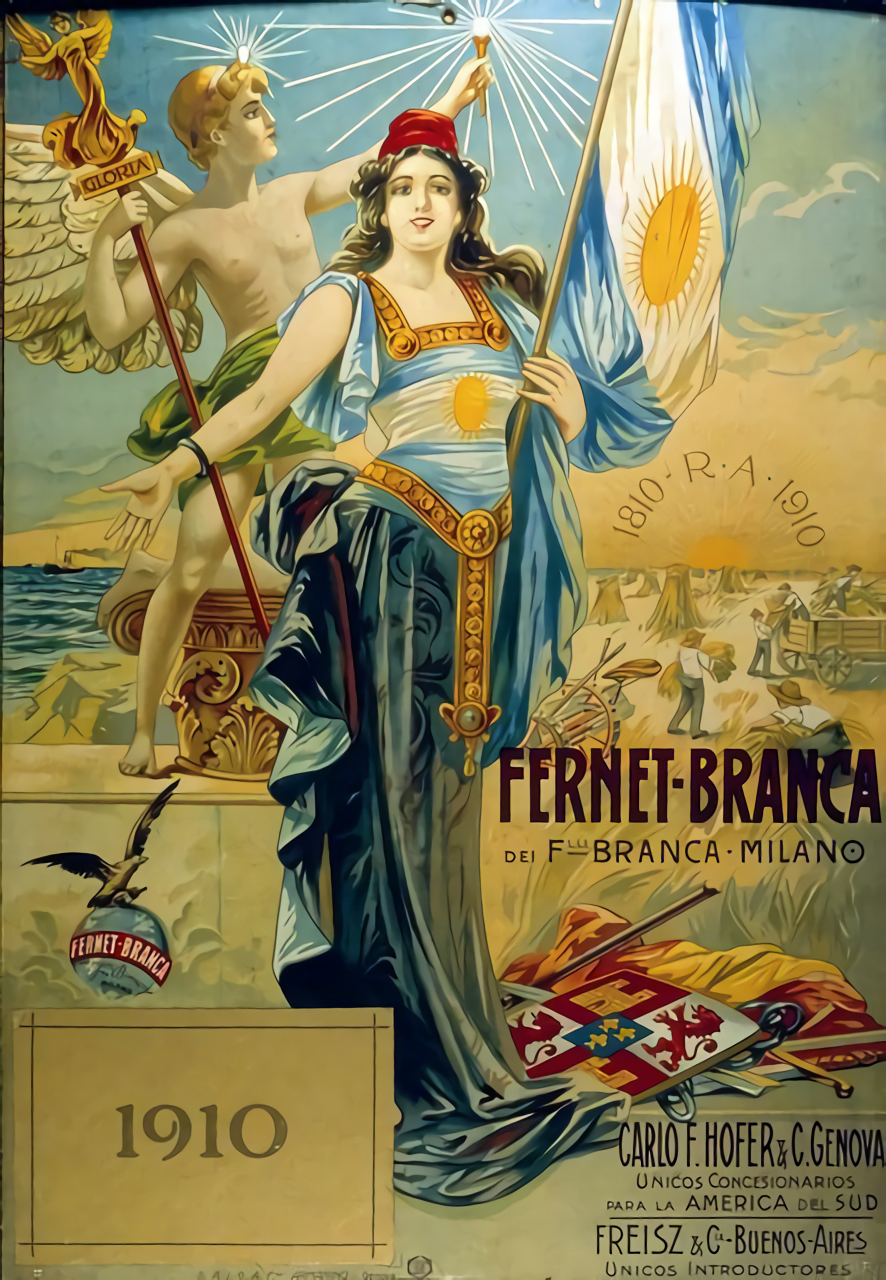
Advertisement for Fernet Branca celebrating the Centennial

The celebrations began on May 21, 1910. The most notable visitor was Infanta Isabella, who spent her days in the country host at the Family Bary's Palace sited in Avenida Alvear. On the Avenida de Mayo, the "Edificio La Inmobiliaria" was inaugurated on May 25. It was designed by Italian architect Luis Broggi.

Other guests were president of Chile, Pedro Montt and vice-president of Peru, Eugenio Larraburu y Unanue. Professor Ferdinando Martini represented Italy while General Colmar von der Goltz came from Germany. Leonard Wood, governor of Cuba after the Spanish–American War represented the United States, arriving with four cruisers. A member of the Japanese imperial family tree, Eki Mocki, was also part of the celebrations.

Other countries represented at the Centannial were Uruguay, Paraguay, France, Russia and The Netherlands, while Great Britain did not send any representative due to the death of King Edward VII.

In the Teatro Colón (inaugurated two years before the Centennial) the opera Rigoletto was sung by Italian baritone Titta Ruffo, on May 24. Personalities from the cultural world also visited Argentina for the Centennial, with Spanish Ramón del Valle Inclán, Jacinto Benavente, Vicente Blasco Ibáñez; French Georges Clemenceau, Jean Jaurès, Anatole France and Jules Huret; Nicaraguan Rubén Darío among them

Other personalities that attended the Centennial celebrations were sociologist Enrico Ferri, writer Pietro Gori and Gina Lombroso, daughter of criminologist and physician Cesare Lombroso. The world of arts was represented by dancer Isadora Duncan and French actress Marguerite Moreno.

In sports, the raising popularity of football in Argentina paved the way to organise the first South American competition, the Copa Centenario Revolución de Mayo, with Argentina, Uruguay and Chile taking part of the tournament. This championship is considered predecessor of Copa América, first held in 1916.

Moreover, the British and Irish Lions toured on Argentina as part of the Centennial celebrations. Managed by RV Stanley, the British combined arrived to Arrived to Argentina to play a total of six games in the country, from May 26 to June 17. The hosts referred to the team as the "Combined British".

The Argentina national team made its international debut against the Lions under the name "The River Plate Rugby Football Union" on 12 June. The match was played at Sociedad Sportiva Argentina of Palermo.

== Memorials ==
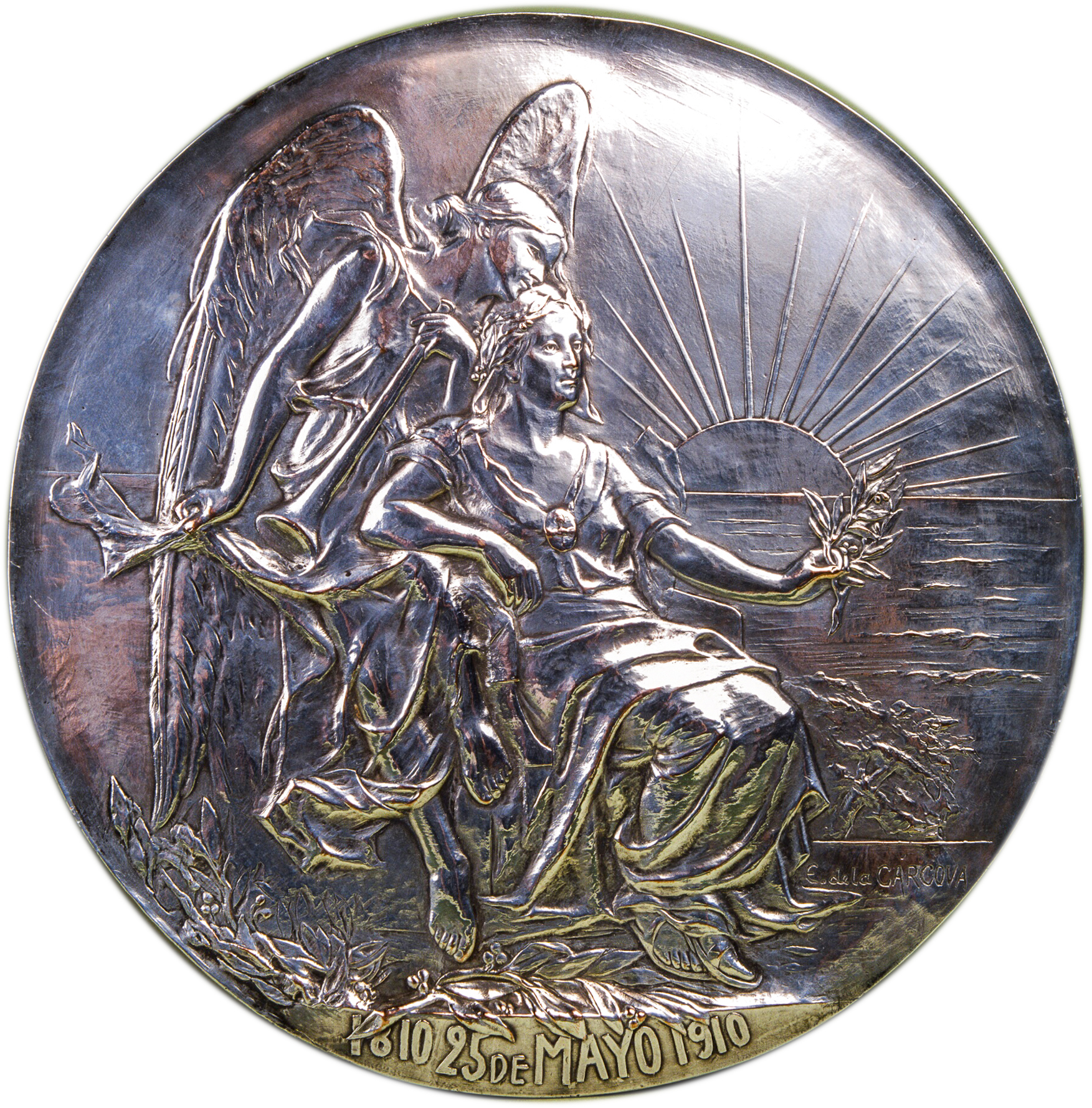
Commemorative copper medal by sculptor Ernesto de la Cárcova

Apart from the construction of elegant pavilions and the inauguration of big buildings that renewed the city of Buenos Aires, several monuments were given by the different collectivity of immigrants living in Argentina.

Some of the memorials were:

- Monument to the Carta Magna and Four Regions of Argentina (commonly referred as "Monument of the Spanish") donated by the Spanish community. It was designed by Agustí Querol Subirats and placed in the intersection of Del Libertador and Sarmiento Avenues of Palermo.
- Monument to Christopher Columbus, by the Italian community. Originally placed in front of Casa Rosada, in 2015 the monument was dismantled and moved near Aeroparque Jorge Newbery to be replaced by a statue of Juana Azurduy. (Note: There are projects to assemble the statue and place it in Costanera Sur.)
- Torre Monumental by the British community. Located in Retiro, Buenos Aires, in front to the Retiro railway station
- France to Argentina, by Émile Peynot, gift from French community. Located in France Park, Buenos Aires.
- Weather Tower, by the Austro-Hungarian Empire. Set in the Botanical Garden Carlos Thays.
- Monument to George Washington, by the United States, placed in Parque Tres de Febrero

Notes

Memorials donated by immigrant communities in Argentina
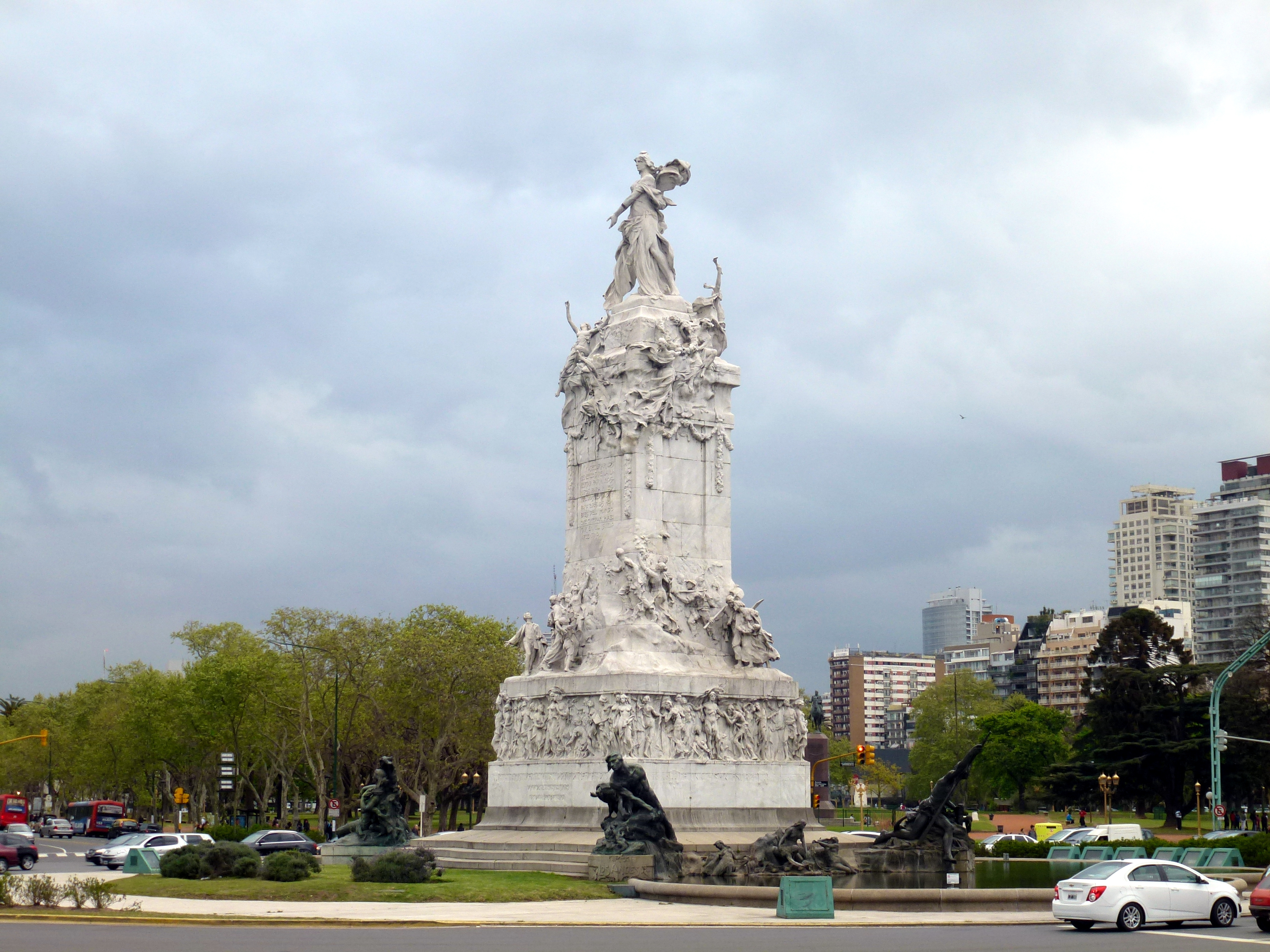
Monument to the Carta Magna and the Four Regions (Spain)

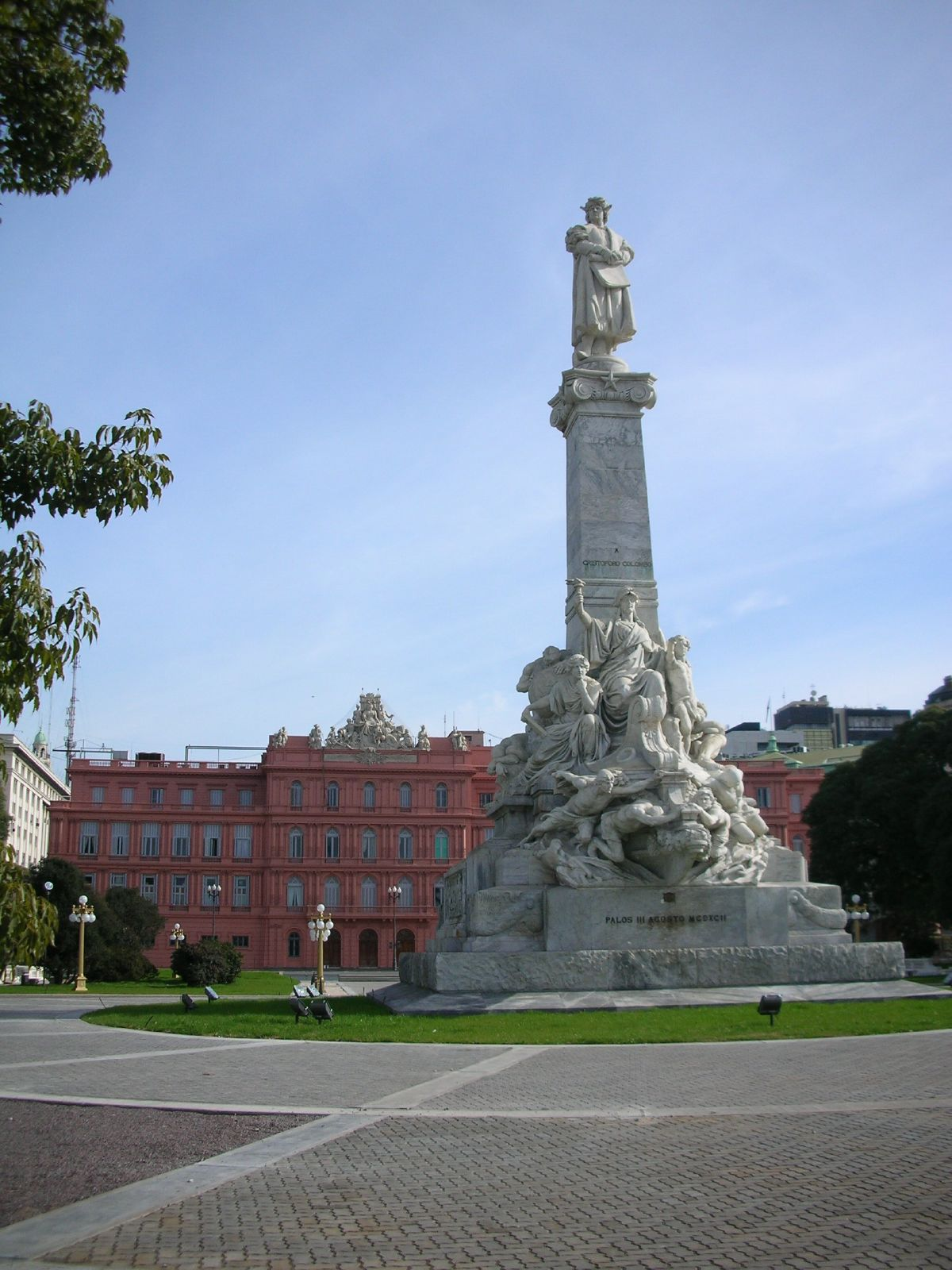
Monument to Christopher Columbus (Italy)

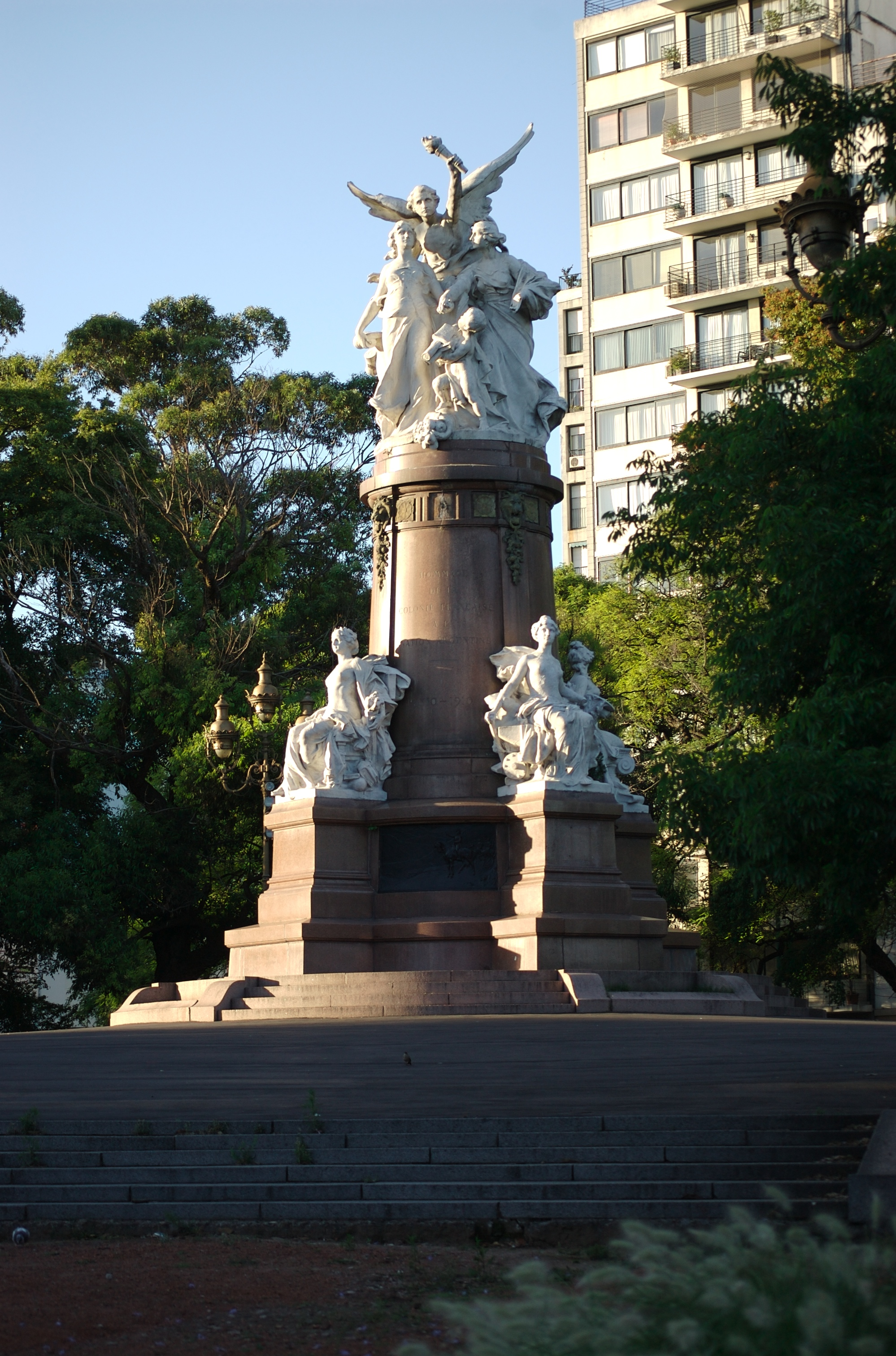
Francia to Argentina (France)

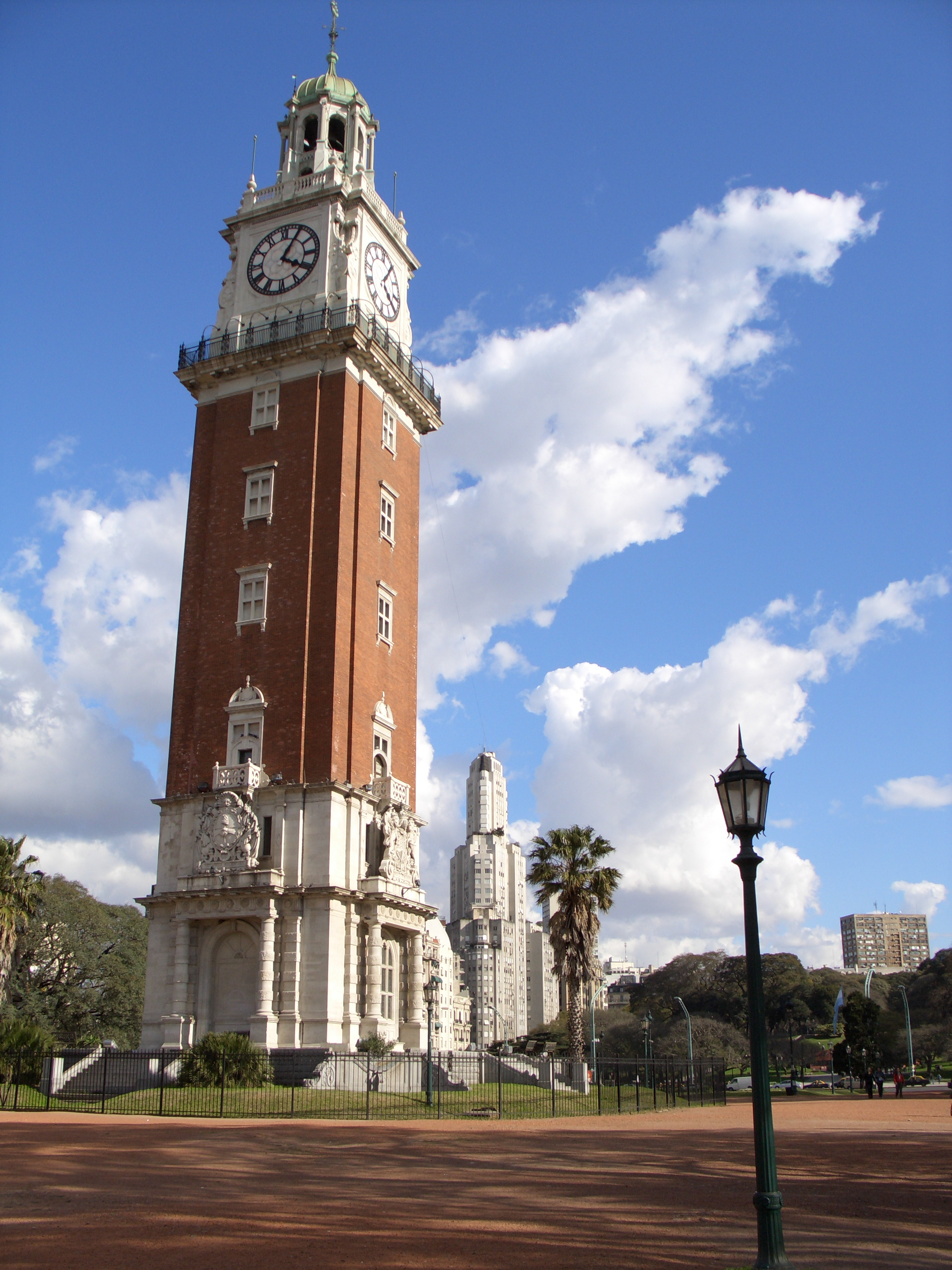
Torre Monumental (Great Britain)

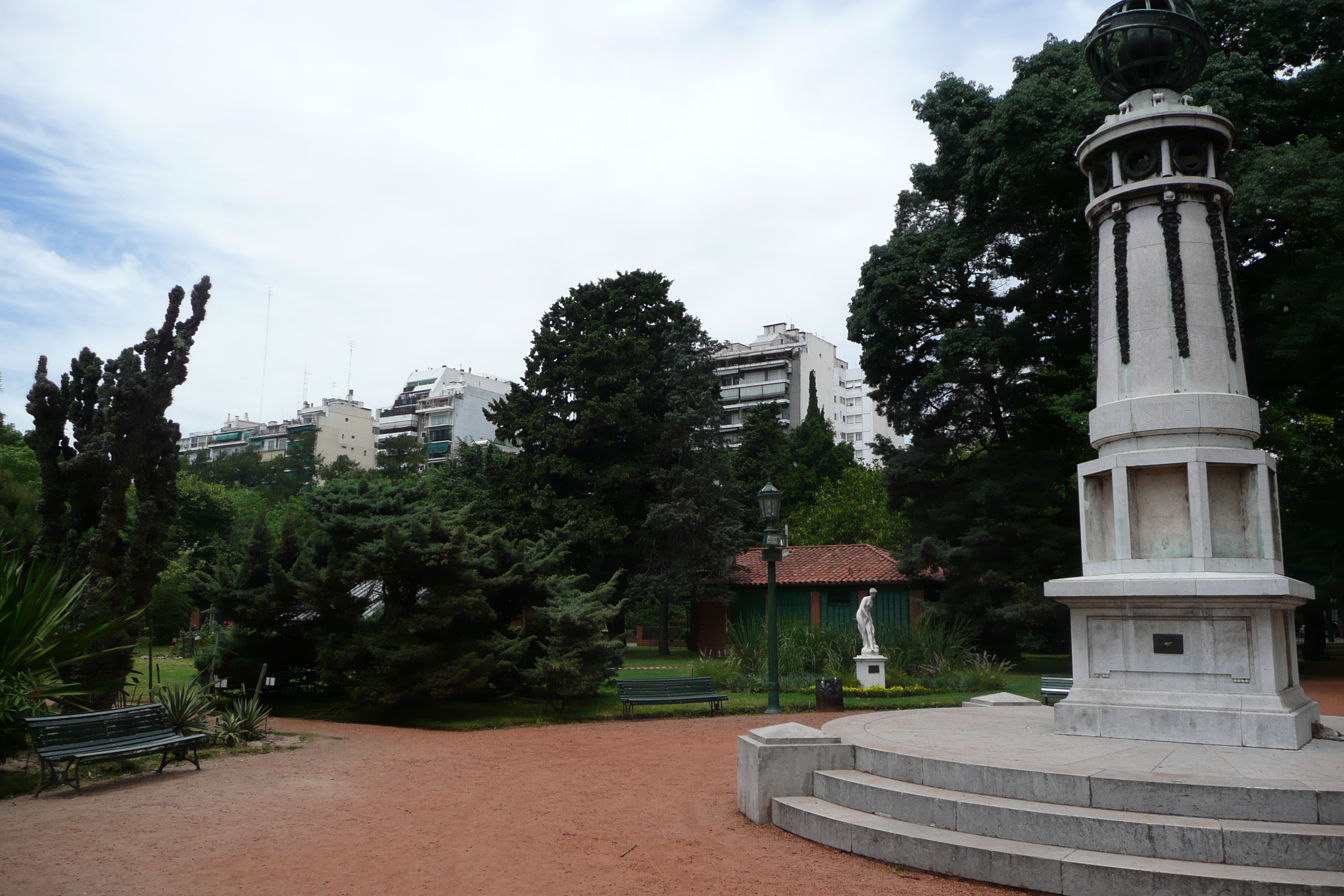
Weather Tower (Austro-Hungarian Empire)

== See also ==
- May Revolution
- Argentina Bicentennial
- Exposición Internacional del Centenario
- Copa Centenario Revolución de Mayo
