= Colon Theater Ballet =

Ballet company in Buenos Aires, Argentina

General information
- Name: Colon Theater Ballet
- Year founded: 1925
- Principal venue: Teatro Colón (Colon Theater)
- Website: Official Website

Senior staff
- Director: Lidia Segni

Artistic staff
- Artistic Director: Paloma Herrera

Other
- Orchestra: Buenos Aires Philharmonic
- Official school: Colon Theater Superior Institute of Art
- Formation: Principal; Soloist; Corps de Ballet

Colon Theater Ballet is a ballet company based in Buenos Aires, Argentina. The company is attached to the Colon Theater, which is also home to the Buenos Aires Philharmonic orchestra and the Colon Theater Opera company. It was established in 1925 and is the oldest ballet company in South America.

== History ==
The Colon Theater Ballet is based at the Colon Theater in Argentina's capital and largest city, Buenos Aires. The Colon Theater was built in 1908 and an opera company was created at that time at the new theater. Colon Theater is the largest classical music hall in South America. Although the current Colon Theater opened in 1908, it was not until 1925 that the Theater's own dance company gave its first performance. Before that, the Colon Theater had hosted foreign ballet artists on its stage, with touring companies from Europe presenting full ballets as early as 1867. Vaslav Nijinsky's final performance was at the Colon Theatre on September 26, 1911, when he danced in Le Spectre de la Rose and Petrushka.

From the late 1930s to the late 1940s, the company developed to a larger scale under the choreographer Margarita Wallman. The Ballets Russes company, under Colonel de Basel, fled World War II and found temporary refuge at the Colon Theater during the 1940s. Avant garde choreographers of the period worked in Buenos Aires, including Bronislava Nijinska, Michel Fokine, who staged eight of his ballets at the Colon Theater Ballet; Serge Lifar; Leonide Massine, Antony Tudor and David Lichine.

Even larger productions were staged during the 1950s. By the 1960s, lavish productions with internationally known dancers such as Rudolph Nureyev were held at the Colon Theater. The dance world of Argentina suffered a serious setback on October 10, 1971, when 10 of the country's top ballet performers died in a plane crash.

Argentine ballet gained a higher profile during the 1980s. Maximiliano Guerra rose to the position of principal at the English National Ballet, and returned with that company to perform Swan Lake at the Colon Theater. Paloma Herrera was already well known while being a dance student at Colon Theater. Julio Bocca studied dance at the Colon, then went on to perform internationally. He founded Ballet Argentino in 1990, with a focus on young Argentinian dancers.

Colon Theater Ballet helped launch the newly renovated Colon Theater during its 2010 season.

== Guest performers ==
Many internationally known ballet artists have performed on the Colon Theatre stage, including: Anna Pavlova, Vaslav Nijinsky, Rudolf Nureyev, Alicia Alonso, Maya Plisetskaya, Margot Fonteyn, Mikhail Barishnikov, Vladimir Vassileyev, and Antonio Gades. Notable Argentinian dancers who have performed at Colon Theatre include: María Ruanova, Olga Ferri, Michel Borovsky, José Neglia, Norma Fontenla, Wasil Tupin, Esmeralda Agoglia, Jorge Donn, Julio Bocca, Maximiliano Guerra, and Paloma Herrera.

== See also ==
- Culture of Argentina
- Glossary of ballet
