= Olga Ferri =

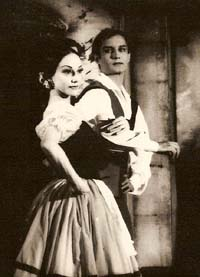
Olga Ferri as Giselle

Olga Ferri (20 September 1928 – 15 September 2012) was an Argentine choreographer and ballet dancer. For decades she was the leading figure of the ballet at the Teatro Colón in Buenos Aires, along with Esmeralda Agoglia, María Ruanova, Violeta Janeiro and the ill-fated Norma Fontenla, she was part of the notable group of ballerinas in Buenos Aires during the 50s-70s.

== Biography ==
A student of Esmée Bulnes, she trained at the Teatro Colón Dance School and became a member of the theater's permanent ballet.

At the age of 18 she was a soloist and, from 1949, the first dancer of the theatre's ballet, starring in the premieres of Romeo and Juliet, Margarita Wallmann's The Birds, and Léonide Massine's Fantastic Symphony.

In 1954, The Lady and the Unicorn by Heinz Rosen premiered, based on an idea by Jean Cocteau, and in 1958, Alicia Alonso was chosen to star in Giselle as the first Argentine dancer to perform it in its original choreographic version.

Her international career took her to Brazil and Paris, where she perfected her skills with Victor Gsovsky, Nicolas Zverev and Boris Kniaseff whilst in Munich and Berlin, and then as a soloist with the Ballet del Marqués de Cuevas and London's Festival Ballet in 1960, 1961, 1963 and 1966, where she danced Giselle, The Snow Maiden, The Spectre of the Rose and others.

In that British company she starred in the premiere of the complete version of Swan Lake choreographed by Jack Carter and The Dying Swan.

She alternates her international activity with the Teatro Colón where in 1971 Rudolf Nureyev chose her for his version of The Nutcracker which premiered with him in Buenos Aires and where she also danced "Coppelia", "The Sleeping Beauty", "Orfeo" as well as the world premieres of "Romeo and Juliet" (with José Neglia ) and "Cinderella" by George Skibine and "La Sylphide" by Pierre Lacotte.

== Legacy ==
To mark Olga Ferri's 85th birthday (20 September 2013) Argentine Google Chrome received a commemorative Google Doodle. The logo was reimagined by children's book illustrator, Mike Dutton.
