= Paloma Herrera =

Argentine ballet dancer

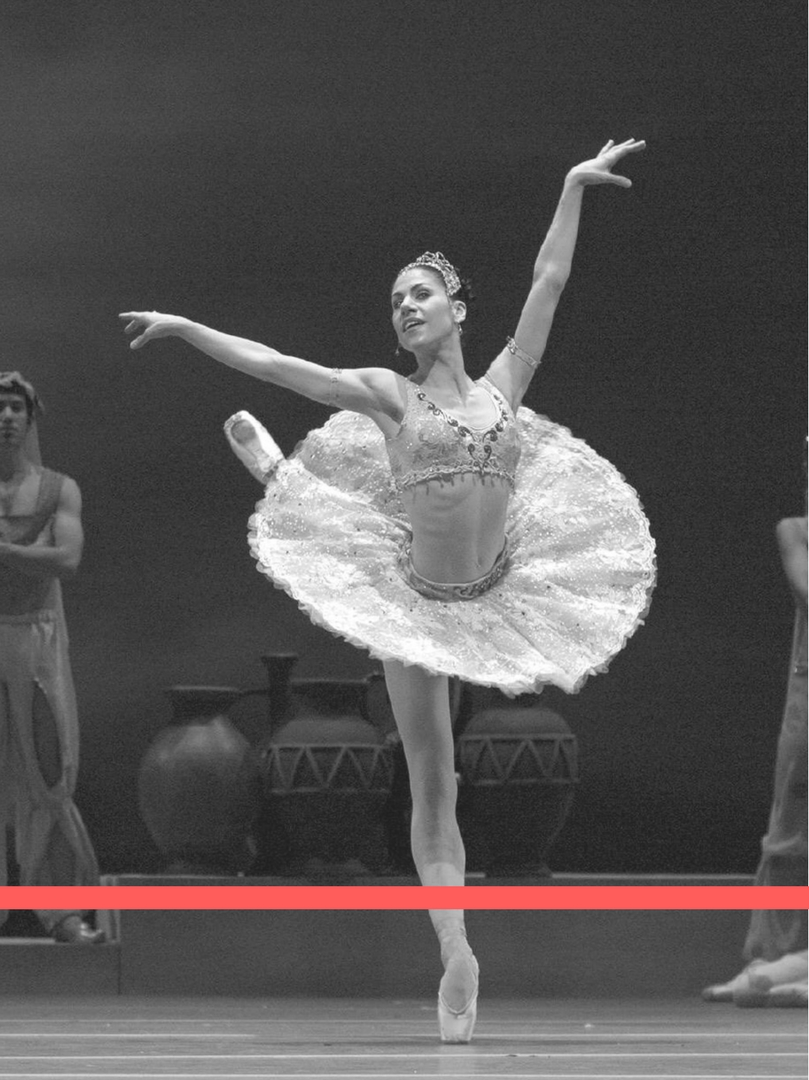
- Born: 21 December 1975 (age 49); Buenos Aires, Argentina
- Occupation: ballet dancer
- Years active: 1991–2015
- Career
- Former groups: American Ballet Theatre
- Website: www.PalomaHerrera.com

Paloma Herrera (born 21 December 1975) is a prominent Argentine ballet dancer, choreographer, and artistic director who was a principal dancer with American Ballet Theatre, where she worked for twenty-four years. She was the director of Colon Theater Ballet from 2017 until 2022.

Herrera was born in Buenos Aires, Argentina, and began studying ballet there at the age of seven with teacher Olga Ferri. She quickly became a noted prodigy in South America, winning many competitions throughout and was able to continue her training at the Minsk Ballet School in the Belorussian Soviet Socialist Republic (now Belarus); returning to Buenos Aires, she was cast as Cupid in a performance of Don Quixote at the Teatro Colón.

With her reputation growing, Herrera was invited by Natalia Makarova to study with her at the English National Ballet in London. Soon afterwards, she studied at the School of American Ballet in New York City, where she made such an impression that she was selected to dance the lead role in Raymonda in the school's annual workshop performance.

She officially became a member of the American Ballet Theatre's corps de ballet in 1991; by 1993, she was promoted to soloist, and by 1995 she became a principal dancer.

Herrera was honored by the American Immigration Law Foundation in 2001 for her contributions as a member of New York's immigrant population. In addition to being a respected ballerina, she is a common presence in the New York social scene.

Herrera retired from professional ballet as a dancer in 2015. ABT's 2015 Spring Season was her final one with the company. Principal dancers Julie Kent and Xiomara Reyes retired at the same time.

On 8 August 2017, she was appointed director of the Colon Theater Ballet, a position in which she replaced Maximiliano Guerra, who was removed from office after a public confrontation with the dance corps. The inauguration took place in a ceremony in the Theatre itself directed by the city's mayor, Horacio Rodríguez Larreta. She resigned from the position in 2022 due to confrontation with dance corps and lack of support from the city authorities.
