= Martinoli =

Martinoli is a surname. Notable people with the surname include:

- Alcherio Martinoli, Swiss roboticist
- Christian Martinoli (born 1975), Argentine-born Mexican sports journalist and sports commentator
- Lida Martinoli (1914–1991), Argentine dancer, choreographer, and theatre performer
- Stefano Martinoli (born 1935), Italian rower
- Teresio Martinoli (1917–1944), Italian fighter pilot

== See also ==
- Meanings of minor-planet names: 61001–62000#195
