= Esmeralda Agoglia =

Argentine ballerina (1923–2014)

- Esmeralda Agoglia
- Born: 29 August 1923; Buenos Aires, Argentina
- Died: 21 October 2014 (aged 91); Buenos Aires, Argentina
- Occupation: Ballerina

Esmeralda Agoglia (29 August 1923 – 21 October 2014) was an Argentine prima ballerina, choreographer and director of Argentina's Ballet Estable at the Teatro Colón. She was known for her performing and staging works by George Balanchine, and portraying Odile in the 1963 Jack Carter production of Swan Lake. Agoglia also directed various ballet television productions during the 1950s.

== Early life and education ==
Esmeralda Agoglia was born in Buenos Aires on 29 August 1923. (Note: Encyclopedia.com and The Dance Encyclopedia claim she was born in 1926) She studied dance with Michel Borovski, Esmée Bulnes and Mercedes Quintana.

== Career ==
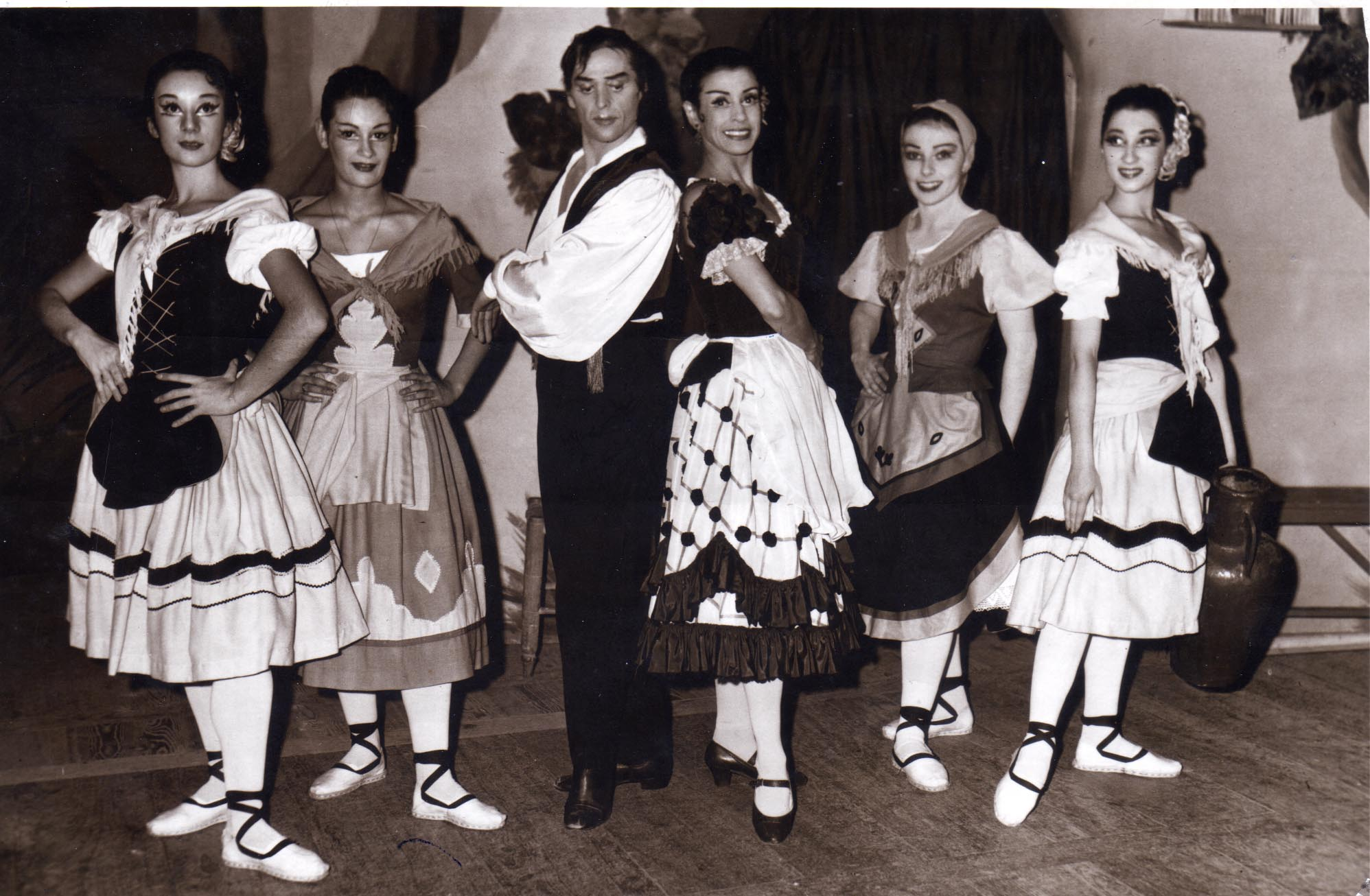
Agoglia performing The Three-Cornered Hat in 1963

Agoglia joined the Ballet Estable at the Teatro Colón in Buenos Aires in 1941. The next year, she danced in Mozart Violin Concerto by George Balanchine with the company. From 1949 to 1976 she was the company's prima ballerina. Among her roles were in Apollo, Capriccio Espagnol, The Firebird, Queen of the Wilis in Giselle, Les Sylphides and Prodigal Son.

Throughout the 1950s, she directed various ballet productions for television. In May 1963, she danced Odile in a Swan Lake production directed by Jack Carter.

Agoglia was contacted by the Jasinski family about Balanchine's Mozart Violin Concerto ballet, which had not been performed since 1968 when it ceased to be a part of the Teatro Colón's repertoire. In 1985, she was officially hired as a guest artistic director on a two year contract at the Jasinski's Tulsa Ballet Theater to stage a revival of the ballet. Agoglia used her own memories of performing it to recreate the production. However, some aspects were updated including the scenery and costuming. It premiered at the Brooklyn College in New York in February 1987 with Roman L. Jasinski and his wife Kimberly Smiley in the leading roles. The revival was the first time the ballet had been staged in North America. The reproduction continued to be performed through to the following year, where it was televised by KOTV. The following year, Agoglia was interviewed as part of a three-day Balanchine Conference, due to her history with the choreographer's work. Although the entire event was recorded, due to copyright issues all copies were ordered to be destroyed.

== Death ==
Agoglia died on 21 October 2014 in Buenos Aires, at the age of 91.
