= Lida Martinoli =

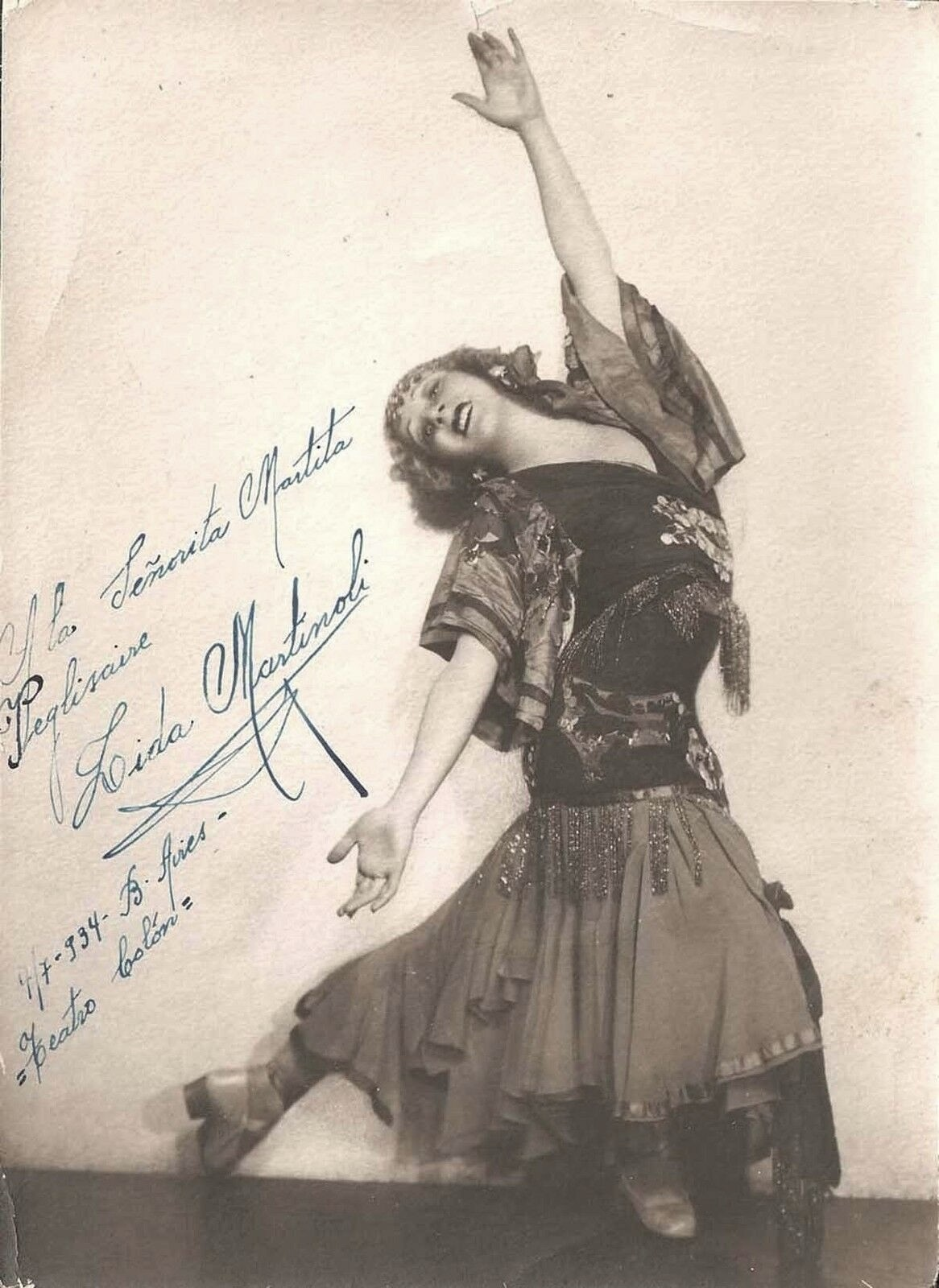
Lida Martinoli

Lida Martinoli (1914–1991) was an Argentine dancer, choreographer, and theatre performer in Buenos Aires. Born in Rosario, Santa Fe in 1914, she was the daughter of the artists Fanny Montiano and Carlos Martinoli. She studied ballet at La Scala in Milan before returning to Buenos Aires in 1932. She joined the corps de ballet of the Teatro Colón, where she danced until 1956. At the Teatro Colón, she served as prima ballerina during the 1940s, dancing the choreographies of Vaslav Nijinsky and Margarita Wallmann and starring in her version of The Nutcracker with Michael Borovski and Maria Ruvanova. In 1953, as prima ballerina for Teatro Colón, she performed at Carnegie Hall in her North American debut. When she retired from dancing, Martinoli began to choreograph, and is known for her kitschy and outlandish dances - the choreography for "La Leprosa" required the actor to stick ham to themselves that fell off during the dance, imitating the symptoms of leprosy. She died in Santa Fe in 1991. Screenwriters Kado Kostzer and Afredo Rodriguez Arias wrote the play Familie d'Artistes about Lida and the Martinoli family in 1989, which was staged at the Teatro Maipo in Buenos Aires in 1991.
