= Susana Zimmermann =

Argentine dancer and choreographer (1932–2021)

- Born: Susana Beatriz Breyter; December 7, 1932
- Died: August 25, 2021 (aged 88); Buenos Aires
- Occupations: Dancer, choreographer, educator
- Career
- Former groups: Ballet de Cámara Argentino, Asociación Amigos de la Danza, Dance Laboratory
- Dances: Contemporary dance, avant-garde

Susana Zimmermann (1932-2021) was an Argentine dancer and choreographer. She was a pioneering figure in contemporary dance in Argentina and had choreographed at least sixty performances staged in different countries. Zimmermann was also an educator and is noted for developing a methodology for dance instruction.

== Biography ==
Zimmermann was born Susana Beatriz Breyter in Buenos Aires on 7 December 1932. Her parents were Abraham Breyter and Juana Huberman. Breyter was a doctor and an immigrant from Kherson, Ukraine. Huberman descended from Romanian immigrants.

She was awarded a scholarship to study dance in Europe. During this period, she trained under Renate Schottelius, Mary Wigman, Dore Hoyer and Maurice Béjart. She was also a student of Mercedes Quintana, Juan Carlos Gené, Alberto Ure, Francisco Kröfl, Centro Teatral Grotowsky, and Vittorio Gassman, among other masters. Zimmermann, who is known for her interest in German Expressionism, had cited the strong influence of the German expressionist dancer and choreographer Dore Hoyer on her career.

== Works ==
In the 1960s, Zimmermann presented her works at the Torcuato di Tella Institute, a prominent avant-garde art space. After the military coup that installed a dictatorship in 1966, she participated in artistic movements that criticized the oppressive regime. Dance Laboratory, a group she founded in 1957, began to feature performances that explored revolutionary spirit and protests against the dictatorship. The dance collectives that she was part of became associated with leftist militant groups. Her work criticizing the government continued until the last military dictatorship through her activism as well as her influence on dancers and performers she mentored.

Zimmermann was a co-director of the Hoy Ballet company during its tour from 1968 to 1973 alongside Ana Labat and Oscar Araiz.

Part of her pioneering work was a methodology that she developed for dance training. This was outlined in the book, The Laboratory of Dance and Creative Movement, which was published in 1983. She also created the Susana Zimmermann Company, which staged dance performances and theater works that featured unconventional themes and addressed current social issues. An example was the Dolentango, which opened in Italy. Using body movements punctuated by a sound score that featured tango citations, this performance commemorated the Madres de Plaza de Mayo.

Zimmermann is also known for using improvisation and spontaneity in her choreography. These are demonstrated in her works Ceremonies, Dies irae (Days of Wrath), and Oye, humanidad (Listen, Humanity), where said themes were treated as specific expressions.

=== Awards ===
Zimmermann had been recognized for her works. Her awards included the Outstanding Personality of Culture of the City of Buenos Aires, by the Porteña Legislature; the Artistic Career Award by the Argentine Dance Council; Lifetime Achievement Award by the Dance Schools of Emilia Romagna; and the UNESCO International Dance Council award.

=== Publications ===
- The Laboratory of Dance and Creative Movement (1983). Editorial Lumen-Humanitas.
- Cantos y Exploraciones: Caminos de Teatro-Danza (2007). Balletin Dance.
