= Ruanova =

Ruanova is a Spanish surname. Notable people with the surname include:

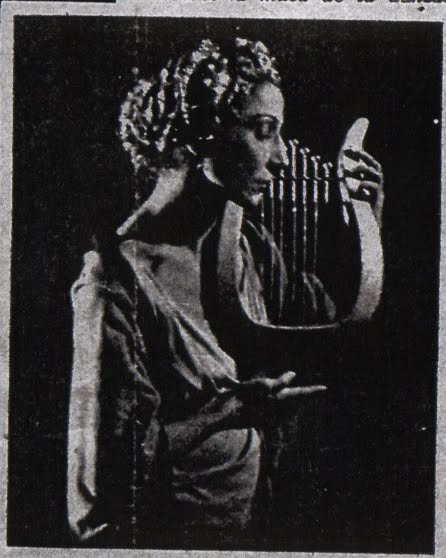
María Ruanova

- Alfredo Ruanova (1919–1977), Argentinian screenwriter
- María Ruanova (1912–1976), Argentinian dancer, choreographer, teacher and ballet master
- Pedro Ruanova (1680-1746), Coronel, in 1712 created a map for San Juan de Ulúa in Veracruz, Mexico
- Pedro José María Monterde y Antillón y Ruanova (1746-1815), supernumerary book professor of the Court and Royal Audience of Accounts.
