= Mercedes Quintana =

Argentine artist

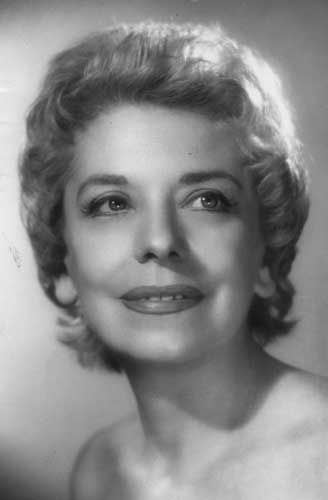
- Portrait of the artist belonging to the photographer Annemarie Heinrich .

Quintana Saravia Haydée Mercedes, known as Mercedes Quintana (1910 – 1996 in Buenos Aires) was an Argentine classical dancer, choreographer, director and actress of stage, screen and television. She had a prominent stage career in Argentina in the 1930s. She appeared in films such as Yo quiero ser bataclana (1941), Ven... mi corazón te llama (1942) and Mujeres que bailan (1949).

Quintana was a director and choreographer of Teatro Colon's Ballet Estable. She also ran her own dance studio, which produced performers such as Susana Zimmermann.

== Selected filmography ==
- I Want to Be a Chorus Girl (1941)
