= José Neglia =

Argentinian ballet dancer

José Neglia (right) accepts the gold medal in Paris from Serge Lifar.

José Neglia (April 2, 1929 – October 10, 1971) was a notable Argentine ballerino, who perhaps more than any other figure, helped popularize the classical ballet in his country.

== Life and work ==
Neglia was born in Buenos Aires to an Italian Argentine family, in 1929. He took an early interest in ballet, and at age 12, began taking lessons at the National Conservatory of Music and Scenic Arts, and later from Michel Borowski, a well-known local figure in ballet. Neglia was accepted into the dance school of the Colón Theatre, the nation's premier opera house, was made part of the opera house's ballet company and was eventually named its primo ballerino.

Leading the ballet company, he became well known during the 1950s and '60s for his performances with his female counterpart in the company, Norma Fontenla. He received numerous distinctions at home and abroad, including the Vaslav Nijinsky Prize from the International Dance Association, and the gold medal at the 6th International Festival of Dance, both in Paris, in 1968. Among his many leading roles, some of the most notable were in Maurice Ravel's Boléro, as Laertes in Hamlet, and in the title roles in Orpheus and Romeo and Juliet. Russian ballet virtuoso Rudolph Nureyev chose the Colón Theatre for his 1971 season of Peter Tchaikovsky's The Nutcracker, for which he joined the ballet company led by Fontenla and Neglia. The success of the program was followed by a series of performances by Nureyev with the company for Argentine television, as well.

== Death ==
The nine members of the ballet company boarded a flight at Jorge Newbery Airfield on October 10, 1971, en route to Trelew, a city in Patagonia where they were scheduled to perform. Shortly after takeoff, however, the twin-engine plane stalled, nose-diving into the Río de la Plata and killing all aboard. Their remains lay in state at the Colón, and on the first anniversary of the tragedy, a monument in their honor was unveiled on Lavalle Plaza, near the opera house.
