= María Ruanova =

Argentine dancer

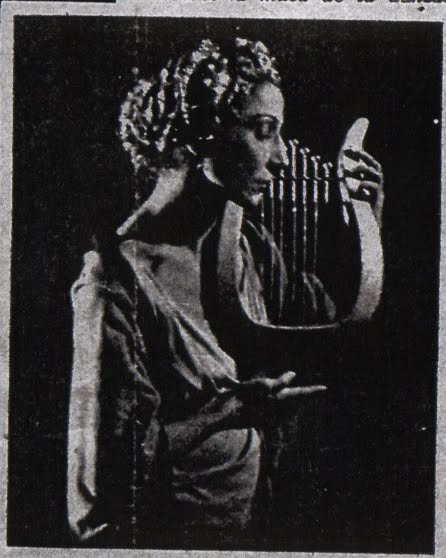
- Born: María Ruanova; July 3, 1912; San Juan, Argentina
- Died: June 5, 1976 (aged 63); Buenos Aires
- Occupation: Ballet dancer
- Known for: Prima ballerina at the Teatro Colón

María Ruanova (July 3, 1912 – June 5, 1976) was an Argentine dancer, choreographer, teacher and ballet master, known for her performances at the Teatro Colón and internationally. She is considered the first Argentina-grown ballet dancer to gain international fame.

== Biography ==
Ruanova's parents were Emilio Ruanova and Mercedes Maury, who met in Barcelona. Her parents had three other children, Merceditas, Angelita and Matilde, with María being the youngest. Her parents immigrated to Argentina and lived in Merlo, Buenos Aires before she was born. She was born in the province of San Juan on 3 July 1912. Her parents returned to Buenos Aires in 1918, after having moved to La Rioja a few years earlier. In Buenos Aires Ruanova became seriously ill with bronchial problems. Doctors recommended physical exercise to improve her condition and thus she took up dancing.

Ruanova, along with her sisters Matilde and Angelita (Ángeles), started dancing under the tutelage of Russian ballerina, María Oleneva during a free classic dance course at the Teatro Colón (Columbus Theatre) in 1924. While her sisters performed with the Cuerpo de Baile in 1925, Ruanova joined Adolph Bolm's ballet, Siluetas. She and her sisters were given a position at the Teatro Colón the following year. Ruanova was first a soloist and, by 1932, a prima ballerina at Teatro Colón. Here they were further tutored by dance greats such as Bronislava Nijinska, Boris Romanoff, Elena Smirnova, Michel Fokine, Antonia Mercé and Serge Lifar. Ruanova earned a role in Fokine's Pájaro de Fuego ballet as prima ballerina.

In 1936 she was invited to perform as prima ballerina in René Blum's Ballet Russe de Monte Carlo. Her success in France led to other international performances in London, Cape Town, Pretoria, Durban, Johannesburg, Glasgow, Manchester and Paris. She danced in El Amor Brujo, Cascanueces, Carnaval, El Espectro de la Rosa, Petrouschka, Anitra, Sílfides. She also filmed Don Juan and L'Épreuve d'amour.

Ruanova performed in Mozart's 1942 world premier concert, choreographed by George Balanchine, at Teatro Colón. She was hired by the Ballet del Marqués de Cuevas as a prima ballerina and Maestro in 1957, and toured Europe with this company. She became ballet director at the Uruguayan SODRE from 1964 to 1967 and at Teatro Colón from 1968 to 1972.

== Recognition ==
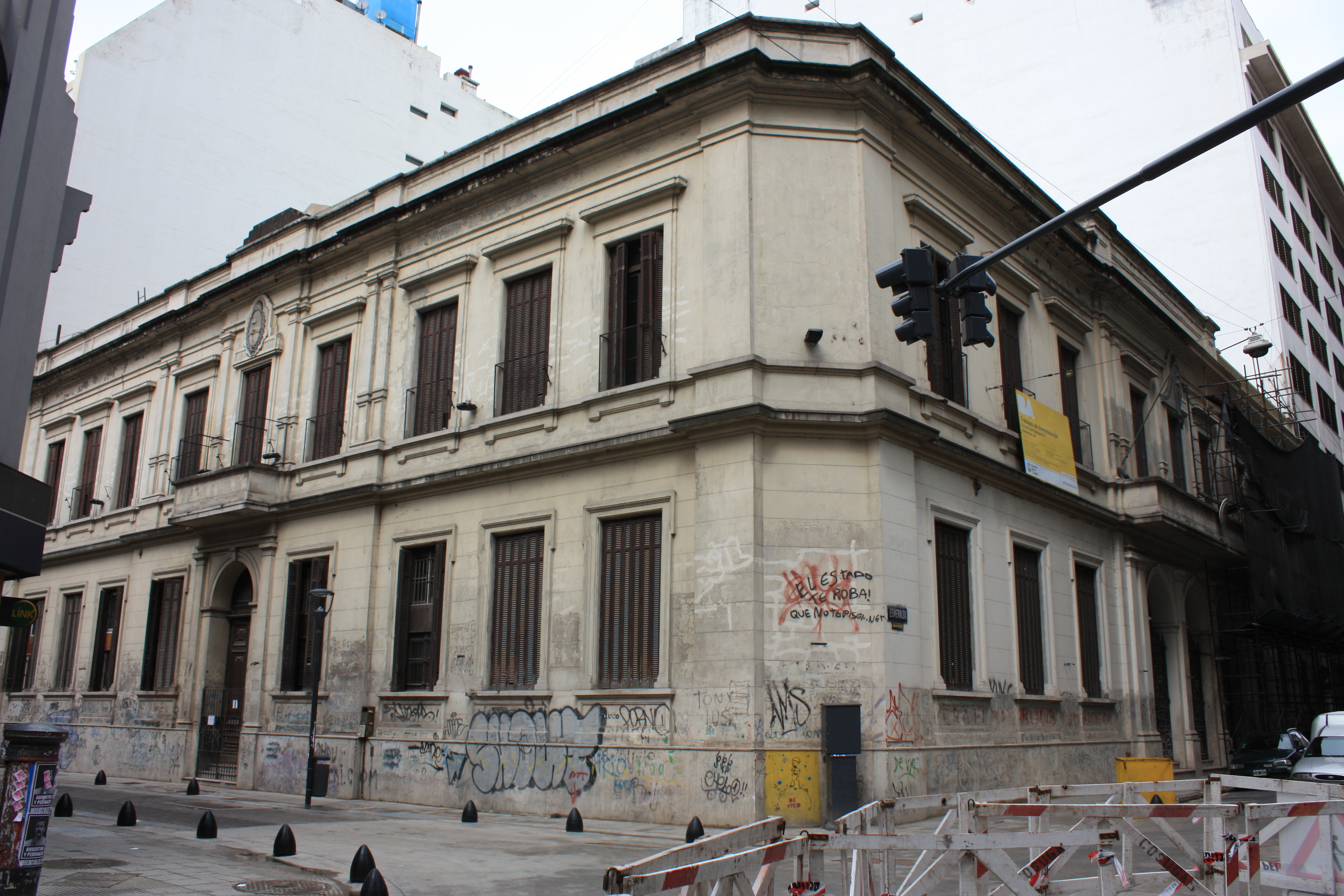
María Ruanova school of dance

Ruanova is celebrated as the first Argentine-born ballet dancer to have learned to dance in Argentina and gain international recognition. She was one of the first prima ballerinas at Teatro Colón and is considered one of its greatest dancers. In 1986 Argentina's Ministry of Culture created the "Premio María Ruanova" award in her honor, awarded yearly by the Argentine dance council, Consejo Argentino de la Danza (CAD). The award has been declared of permanent "Interés Cultural" (cultural interest) by the Ministry. It is the country's highest and most important award for dance.
In honor of her performance and historical legacy, a prominent Argentine liberal arts college was named after her, the Ruanova Institute of Performing Arts, an organisation which houses two educational entities, the Argentine National School of Dance, "Escuela Nacional de Danzas María Ruanova", and the National Institute of Educators of Liberal Arts and Artistic Education "Instituto Nacional Superior del Profesorado". From 1983 to 2013 the institute was part of the IUNA National University Institute for the Arts, and since 2014, the Ruanova Institute of Performing Arts and Higher Education became part of the UNA Universidad Nacional de las Artes, (UNA) National University of the Arts The Ministry of Culture also released a DVD on the life and work of María Ruanova.

== Death ==
Ruanova died on 5 June 1976 and her remains are interred at the Cementerio de la Chacarita in Buenos Aires.
