= Norma Fontenla =

Argentine ballerina

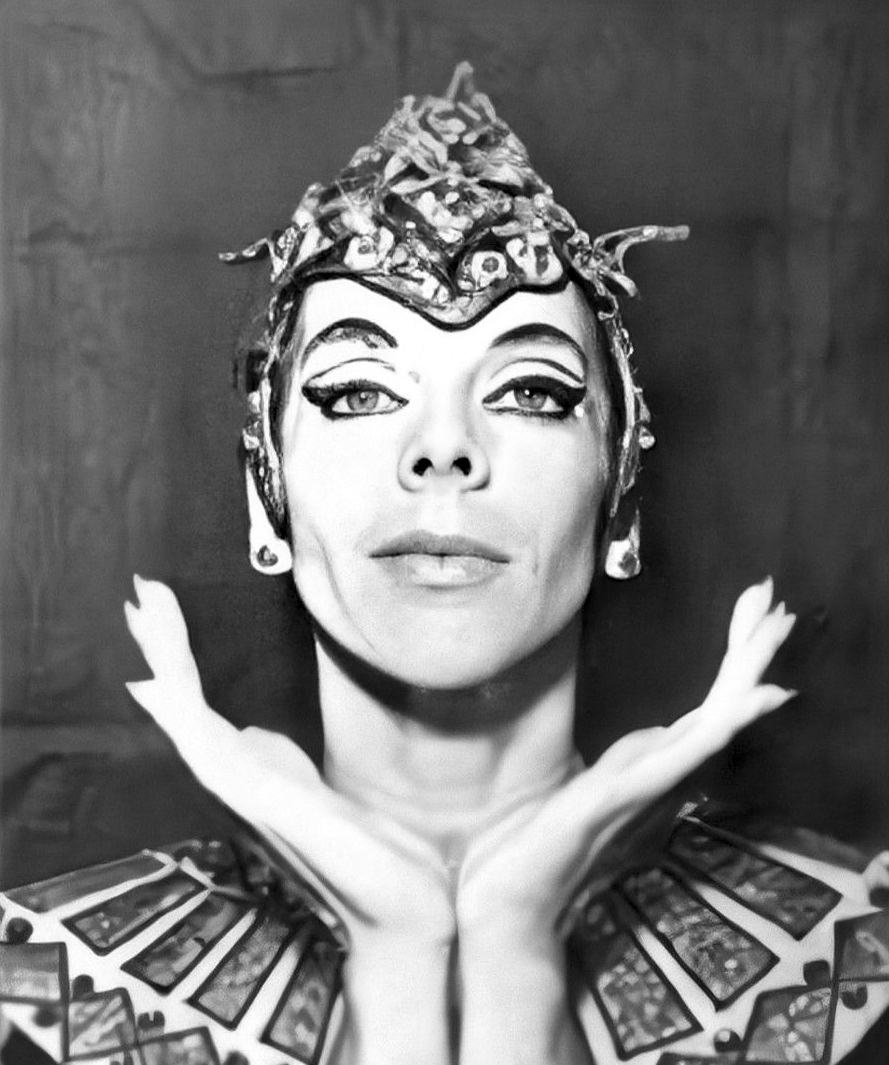
Norma Fontenla

Norma Fontenla (June 28, 1930 – October 10, 1971) was an Argentine prima ballerina.

== Life and work ==
Fontenla was born in 1930, and while still a child, began attending the National Conservatory of Music and Scenic Art, in Buenos Aires. She was later accepted into the dance school of the Colón Theatre, the nation's premier opera house. Fontenla was made part of the opera house's ballet company and was eventually named its prima ballerina.

She joined the Rio de Janeiro Ballet in the early 1960s, and with them made her first European tours. Returning to Buenos Aires, she led the Colón Theatre Ballet in works such as Frédéric Chopin's Les Sylphides, Adolphe Adam's Giselle, Léo Delibes' Coppelia, and as Odette in Peter Tchaikovsky's Swan Lake. Her 1967 performance in Giselle was notable also for her collaboration with Margot Fonteyn and Rudolph Nureyev.

Fontenla performed in Paris in 1968 and in Santiago, Chile in 1969, where she opened the Municipal Theater's ballet season that year. She organized a tour of opera houses in the Argentine hinterland in 1970, and was invited to direct the ballet company in Milan's renowned La Scala. Her previous collaboration with Nureyev earned the Colón Theatre his choosing that venue to perform Tchaikovsky's The Nutcracker for the 1971 season. The success of the program was followed by a series of performances by Nureyev for Argentine television, alongside Fontenla and her primo ballerino, José Neglia.

Fontenla, Neglia and seven other members of the ballet company boarded a flight at Jorge Newbery Airfield on October 10, 1971, en route to Trelew, a city in Patagonia where they were scheduled to perform. Shortly after takeoff, however, the twin-engine plane stalled, nose-diving into the Río de la Plata and killing all aboard. Their remains lay in state at the Colón, and on the first anniversary of the tragedy, a monument in their honor was unveiled on Lavalle Plaza (within steps of the opera house).
