= Teatro Colón =

Opera house in Buenos Aires

Coordinates: 34°36′3.9″S 58°22′59.1″W

Colón Theatre
- Teatro Colón

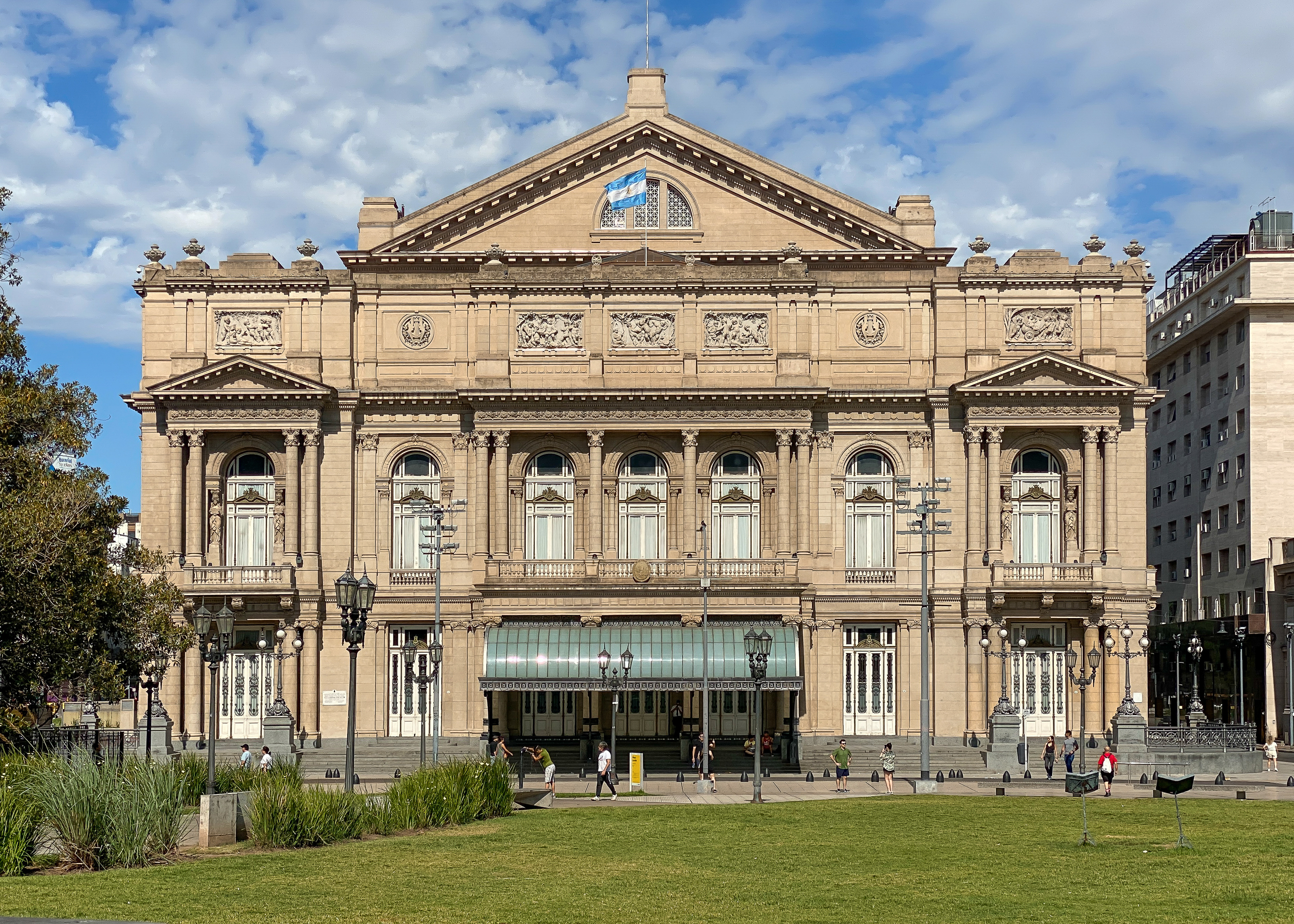
- Main façade of Teatro Colón

General information
- Type: Theatre
- Architectural style: Eclectic
- Location: Buenos Aires, Argentina, Tucumán 1171
- Construction started: 1889
- Completed: 1908
- Opened: 25 May 1908; 118 years ago
- Renovated: 2001–2010
- Owner: City of Buenos Aires

Height
- Height: 28 metres

Dimensions
- Diameter: 58 metres

Technical details
- Structural system: Concrete

Design and construction
- Architects: Francesco Tamburini; Julio Dormal; Vittorio Meano

Other information
- Seating capacity: 2,478

Website
- teatrocolon.org.ar

National Historic Monument of Argentina
- Designated: 1989

The Teatro Colón (English: Colón Theatre) is a historic opera house in Buenos Aires, Argentina. It is considered one of the ten best opera houses in the world by National Geographic. According to a survey carried out by the acoustics expert Leo Beranek among leading international opera and orchestra directors, the Teatro Colón has the room with the best acoustics for opera and the second best for concerts in the world.

The present Colón replaced an original theatre which opened in 1857. Towards the end of the century, it became clear that a new theatre was needed, and after a 20-year process, the present theatre opened on 25 May 1908, with Giuseppe Verdi's Aïda.

The Teatro Colón was visited by the foremost singers and opera companies of the time, who would sometimes go on to other cities including Montevideo, Rio de Janeiro and São Paulo.

After this period of huge international success, the theatre's decline became clear and plans were made for massive renovations. After an initial start of works to restore the landmark in 2005, the theatre was closed for refurbishment from October 2006 to May 2010. It re-opened on 24 May 2010, with a programme for the 2010 season.

The theatre was declared a National Historic Monument in 1989. It is home to the Teatro Colón's Resident Orchestra, Resident Choir, and Resident Ballet, as well as the Buenos Aires Philharmonic Orchestra. The venue also hosts the Teatro Colón’s Center for Experimentation, the Higher Institute of Art with its Orchestral Academy, the Children’s Choir, and the Colón Contemporary music program.

== History ==
The Colón theater operated in two buildings, the first located in the Plaza de Mayo until 1888 and the second located in front of the Plaza Lavalle [es], which took 20 years to be built until its inauguration in 1908. This land formerly housed the Park Station, the first railway station of the Argentine Republic as head of the Western Railway of Buenos Aires.

=== First Teatro Colón ===
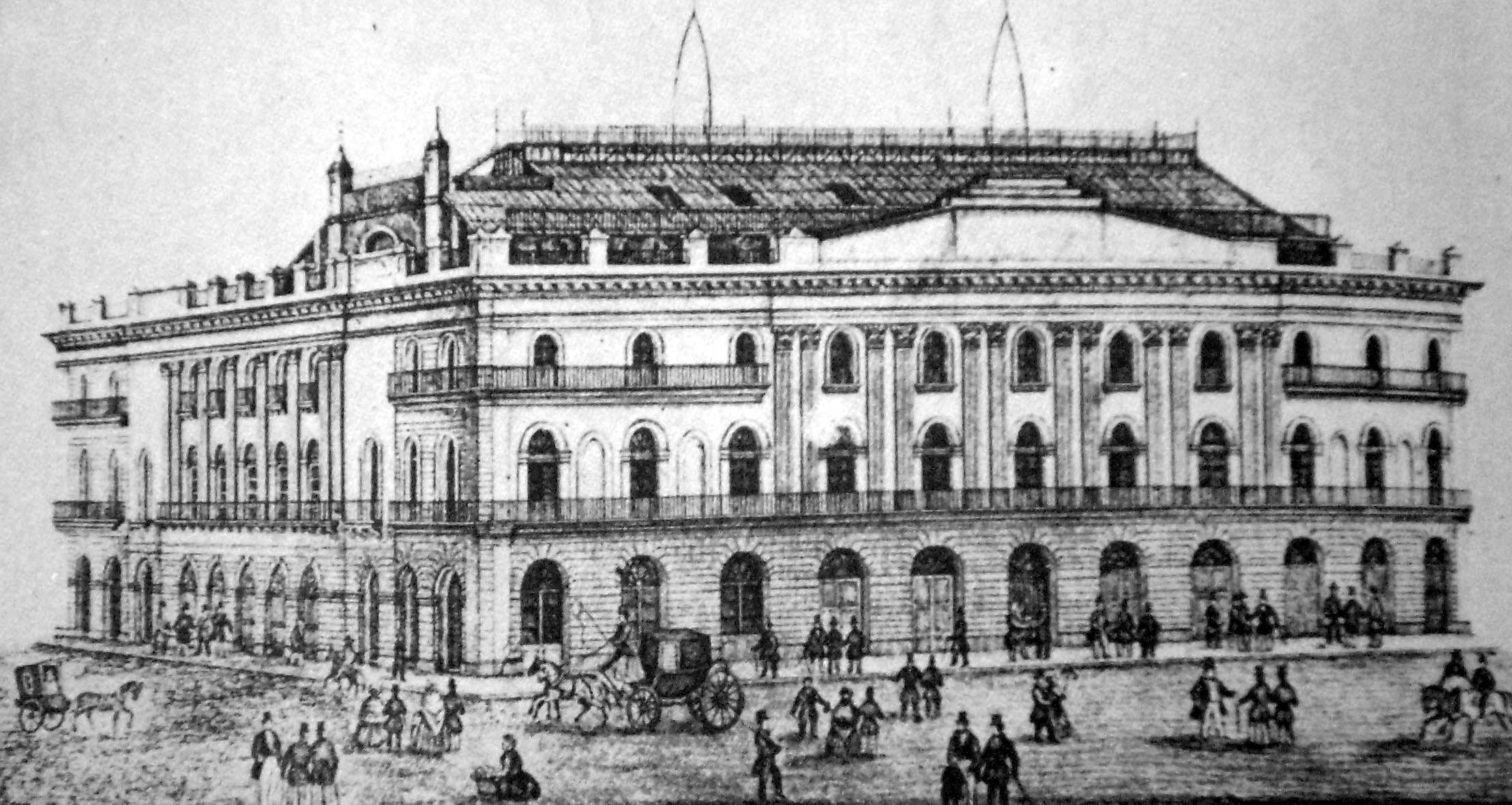
The first Teatro Colón building, located in front of Plaza de Mayo, closed in 1888 and later demolished

The first Teatro Colón was designed by Charles Pellegrini, and proved to be a successful venue for over 30 years, with 2,500 seats with the inclusion of a separate gallery reserved only for people who were in mourning. The construction started in 1856 and completed in 1857. This was celebrated with an opening on 27 April 1857, with Verdi's La traviata, just four years after its Italian premiere. The production starred Sofia Vera Lorini as Violetta and Enrico Tamberlik as Alfredo.

This theater was closed on 13 September 1888 to step aside for a new improved building, which was opened twenty years later on Libertad street, overlooking Plaza Lavalle. In that period of time, the 1890 crisis and its effects were the cause for the delay in the completion of this second theater.

Before the construction of the current Teatro Colón, opera performances were given in several theatres, of which the first Teatro Colón and the Teatro Opera were the most important. The principal company that performed at the Teatro Opera moved to the Teatro Colón in 1908. However, major companies also performed at the Teatro Politeama and the Teatro Coliseo which opened in 1907.

=== Current Teatro Colón ===
The present theatre, the second with that name, opened on 25 May 1908, after twenty years under construction, and was inaugurated with Aida by the Italian company directed by Luigi Mancinelli and tenor Amedeo Bassi, soprano Lucia Crestani (as Aida). The second presentation was Thomas' Hamlet with the baritone Titta Ruffo During the inaugural season seventeen operas were performed with famous stars such as Ruffo, Feodor Chaliapin in Boito's Mefistofele, Antonio Paoli in Verdi's Otello.

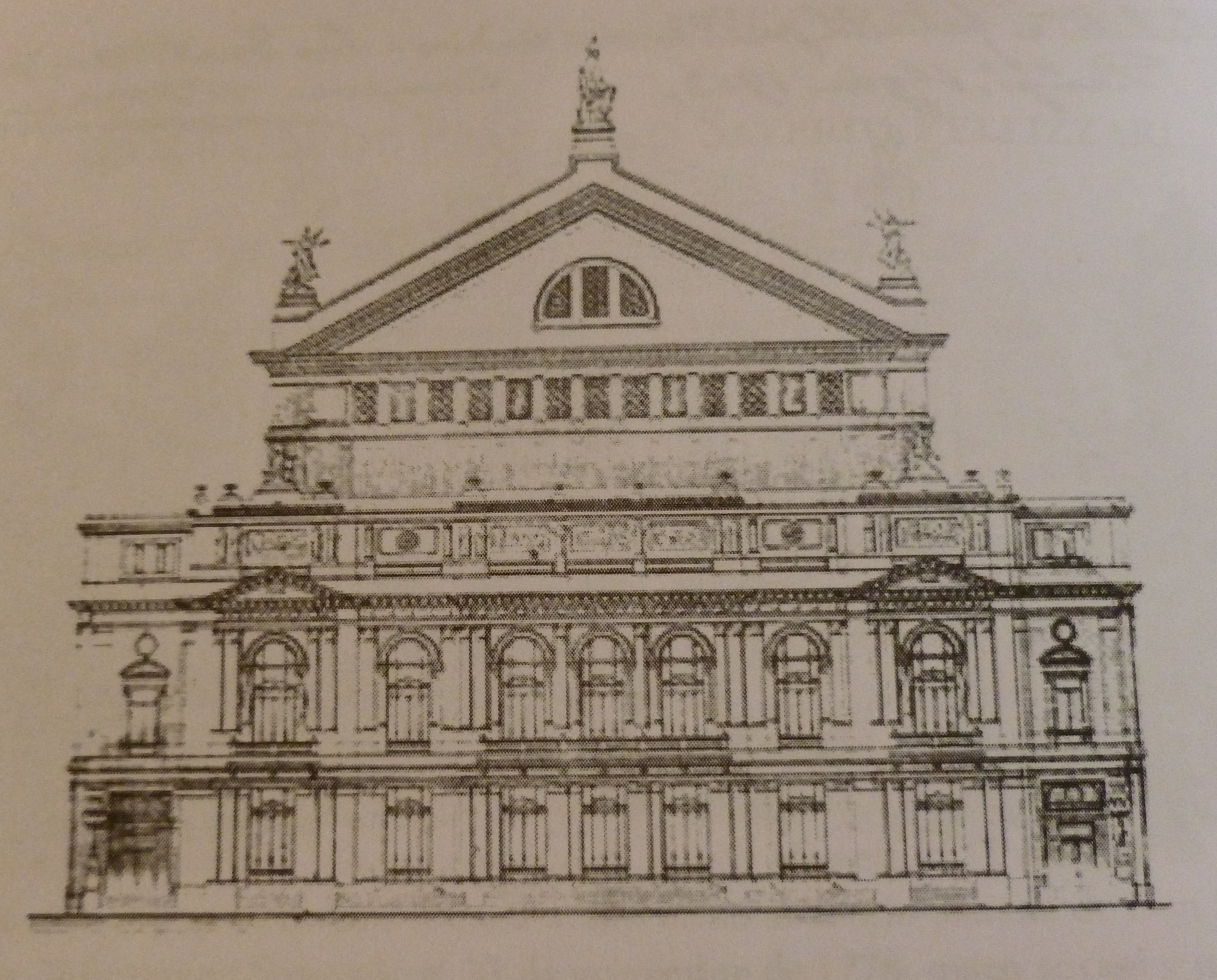
Project of the new building by Vittorio Meano

The cornerstone of the present Teatro Colón was laid in 1889 under the direction of architect Francesco Tamburini and his pupil, Vittorio Meano, who designed a theatre in the Italian style on a scale and with amenities which matched those in Europe. However, delays followed due to financial difficulties, arguments regarding the location, the death of Tamburini in 1891, the murder of Meano in 1904 and the death of Angelo Ferrari, an Italian businessman who was financing the new theatre. The building was finally completed in 1908 under the direction of the Belgian architect Julio Dormal who made some changes in the structure and left his mark in the French style of the decoration. The bas-reliefs and busts on the facade are the work of sculptor Luigi Trinchero.

The current Teatro Colón building in 1908, soon after being inaugurated

The theatre's opening on 25 May, the Día de la Patria in Argentina, featured a performance of Verdi's Aida.

The Teatro was bombed by anarchists in 1910; Georges Clemenceau was present in Argentina during the attack. The bomb landed in the middle of the orchestra. Clemenceau describes the attack as follows: "The horror can not be exaggerated. A senior official told me that he had never seen such puddles of blood. The wounded were carried off as best as possible, and the room was emptied by the cries of fury, and the material damage repaired during the day which followed, not a woman of society missed the representation of the morrow. It is a fine trait of character that particularly honours the female element of the Argentine nation. I am not quite sure that in Paris the hall would have been full in such cases."

Ballet stars performed at the Colón alongside Argentine dancers and classical instrumentalists. This included the prima ballerina, Lida Martinoli. When she retired from dancing, Martinoli began to choreograph. She died in Santa Fe. The tragic 1971 aviation death of two of the best known of these, Norma Fontenla and José Neglia, was commemorated with a monument in neighbouring Lavalle Square.

With excellent acoustics and modern stage areas, the theatre's interior design features a rich scarlet and gold decor. The cupola contains canvas painted in 1966 by the 20th-century artist Raúl Soldi during renovation work.

In recent years, given the political and economic circumstances of Argentina, the Teatro Colón has suffered considerably, but a period of slow recovery began. The theatre underwent massive phased remodelling of both interior and exterior, initially while the house was still open, but production activities ceased at the end of December 2006 to allow full refurbishment. A full restoration work was started, being extending until 2010, when it was reopened on May 24 in commemoration of the Bicentennial of Argentina.

Initially, "what had been planned as an 18-month, $25-million renovation with 500 workers, scheduled for a May 2008 reopening with Aida, became a three-year $100-million extravaganza with 1,500 workers including 130 professional architects and engineers." In addition, an exterior open-air stage was planned for an opening in 2011. In all, 60,000 square metres (645,835 sq ft) underwent updating, both inside and out.

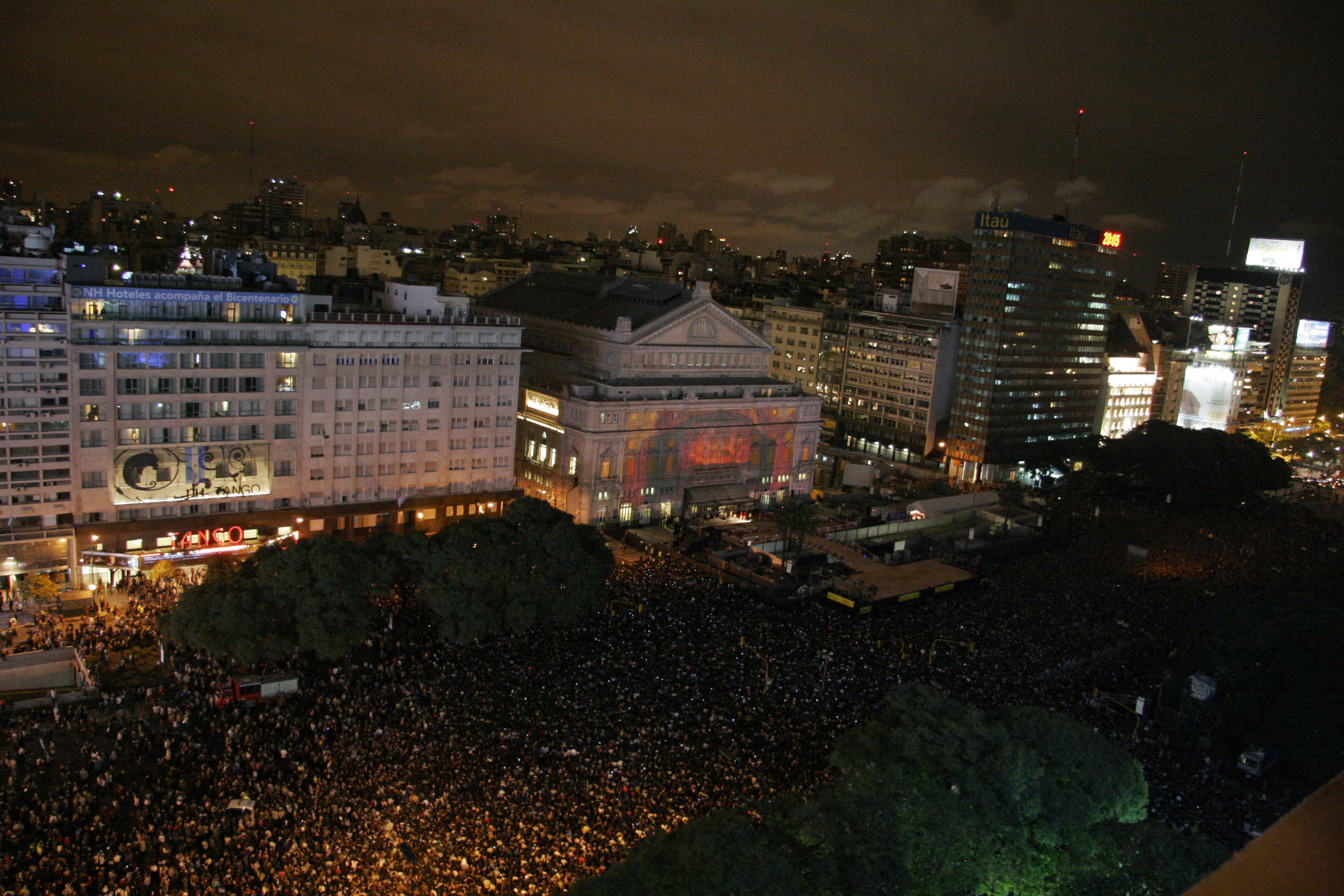
Reopening celebrations

Some of the last performances immediately before closure of the theatre's building were Swan Lake on 30 September with the Ballet Estable del Teatro Colón and the Buenos Aires Philharmonic (Orquesta Filarmónica de Buenos Aires). and, on 28 October, the opera Boris Godunov was given featuring Orquesta Estable del Teatro Colón and the house chorus.

The theatre's final performance before its closure for refurbishment works in 2005 was a concert on 1 November starring folklore singer Mercedes Sosa in performance with the Argentine National Symphony Orchestra, conducted by Pedro Ignacio Calderón.

While it was originally planned to reopen in time for the centenary on 25 May 2008, delays prevented this, and the house was finally reopened with a gala concert and 3D animations on 24 May 2010, the eve of its own 102nd birthday and the Argentina Bicentennial. Tchaikovsky's Swan Lake and Act 2 of Puccini's La bohème were performed. A private concert to test the acoustics attended by employees, architects, and others involved in the renovation occurred on 6 May 2010. On the 6 September 2013, the Teatro Colón hosted the Opening Ceremony of the 125th Session of the International Olympic Committee.

== Characteristics ==
The theatre is bounded by the wide 9 de Julio Avenue (technically Cerrito Street), Libertad Street (the main entrance), Arturo Toscanini Street, and Tucumán Street. It is in the heart of the city on a site once occupied by Ferrocarril Oeste's Plaza Parque station.

The auditorium is horseshoe-shaped, has 2,487 seats (slightly more than the Royal Opera House in Covent Garden, London), standing room for 1,000 and a stage which is 20 m wide, 15 m high and 20 m deep. The low-rise building has 6 floors above ground and 3 below ground, 7 elevators with a facade of applied masonry. It has a large central chandelier with 700 light bulbs. The original architect was the Italian Francesco Tamburini; after his death it was completed by the Belgian architect Julio Dormal. The original auditorium "had eight boxes with metal grilles and a separate entrance, so that those in mourning could still attend performances, but remain dignifiedly sequestered from public view".

The Colon's acoustics are considered to be so good as to place it in the top five performance venues in the world. Luciano Pavarotti held a similar opinion.

== Events and artists ==
Among the main events of the theater's history are the creation of stable bodies in the 1920s and its municipalisation in 1931. In 1946, Peronism promoted a policy of openness to popular music and greater democratisation of the public, which was reverted after its overthrow in 1955 and again resumed when democracy recovered in 1983.

Throughout its history the main figures of opera, classical music and world ballet have performed in the Colón theater, such as Arturo Toscanini, Vaslav Nijinsky, Luisa Tetrazzini, Enrico Caruso, Conchita Supervia, Regina Pacini, Anna Pavlova, Maya Plisetskaya, Margot Fonteyn, Mikhail Barishnikov, Antonio Gades, Richard Strauss, Igor Stravinsky, Camille Saint-Saens, Manuel de Falla, Aaron Copland, Herbert von Karajan, Leonard Bernstein, Mstislav Rostropovich, Zubin Mehta, Maria Callas, Renata Tebaldi, Leontyne Price, Ana Serrano Redonnet, Celia Torra, Yehudi Menuhin, Pau Casals, Rudolf Nureyev, Maurice Béjart, Plácido Domingo, José Carreras, Luciano Pavarotti, Lily Pons, Marina de Gabaráin, Victoria de los Ángeles, Reri Grist, Montserrat Caballé, Kiri Te Kanawa, among others, and Argentine artists such as Adelaida Negri, Héctor Panizza, Alberto Ginastera, Jorge Donn, Norma Fontenla, José Neglia, Olga Ferri, Julio Bocca, Maximiliano Guerra, Paloma Herrera, Daniel Barenboim, Martha Argerich, Astor Piazzolla, Aníbal Troilo, Marianela Nuñez, and Osvaldo Pugliese. Artists outside these realms, such as Chris Cornell, Katherine Jenkins, Sarah Brightman, Joss Stone, and Branford Marsalis, have also played here.

== Gallery ==
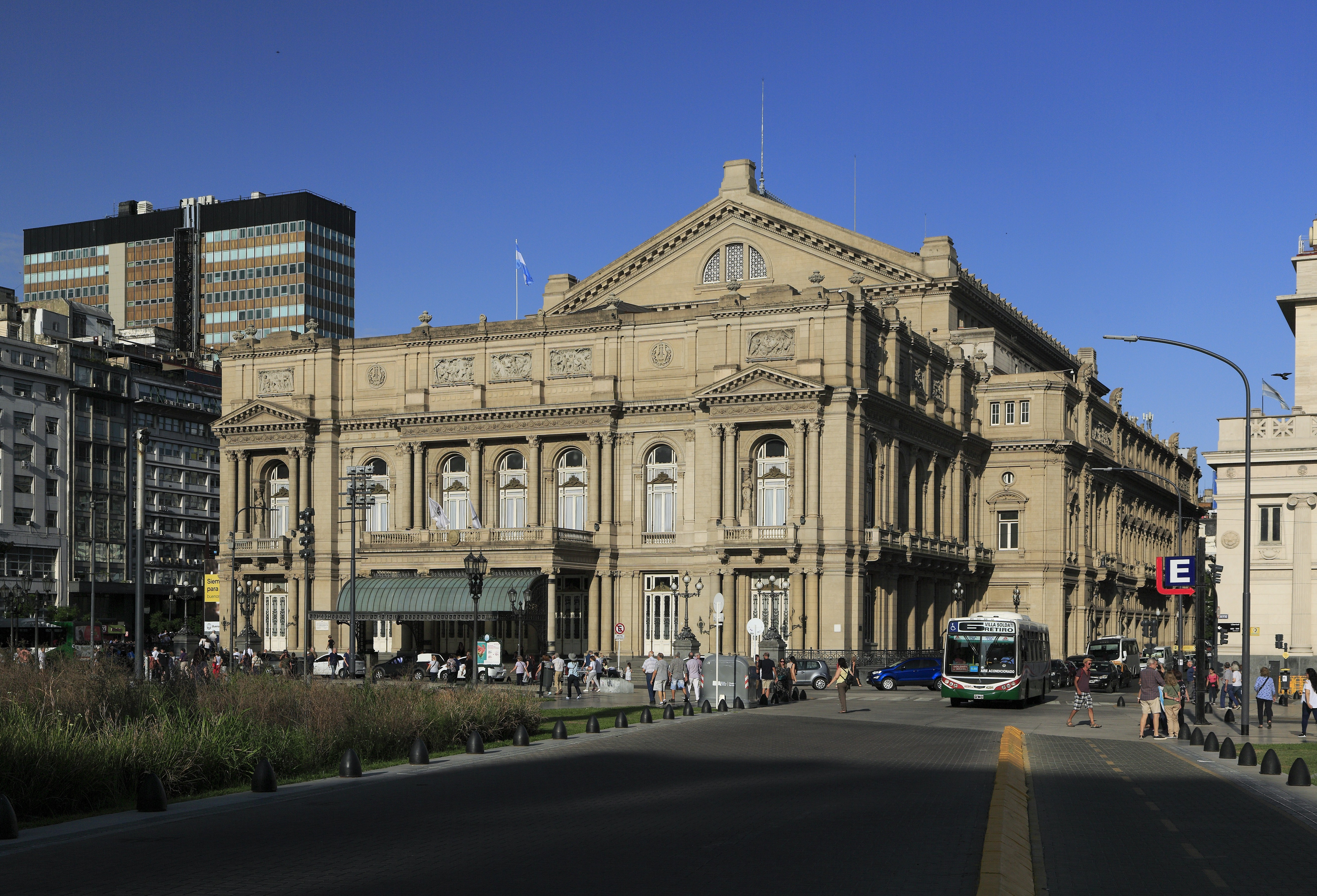
Front entrance

Stage

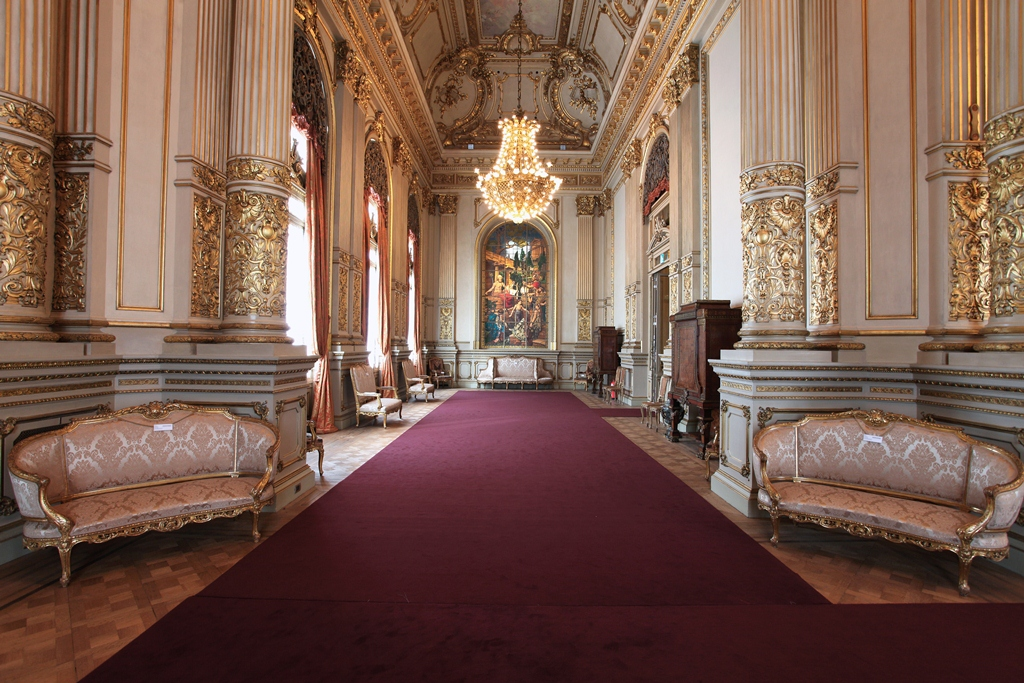
Golden Room

Golden room

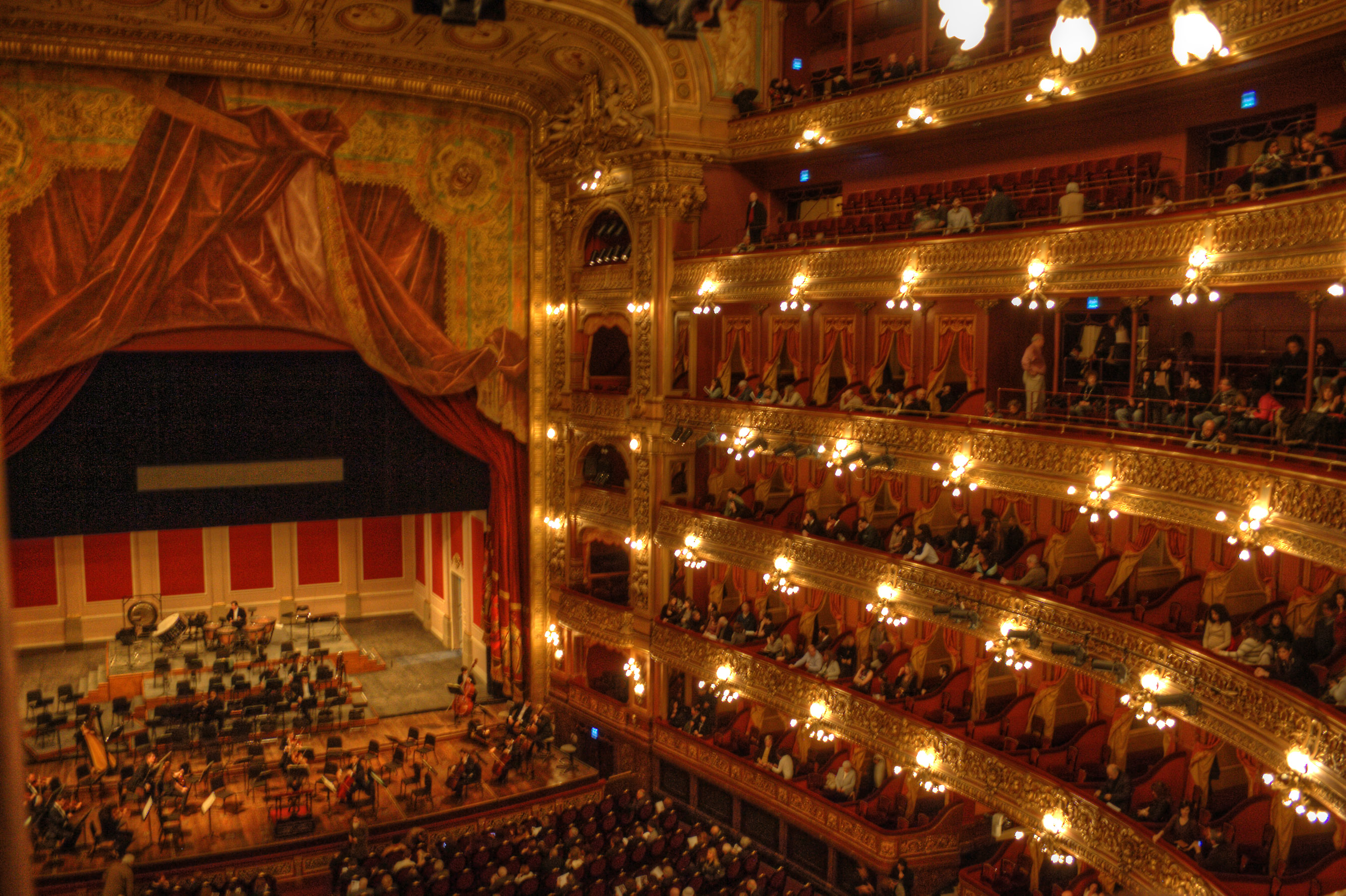
Concert hall and stage

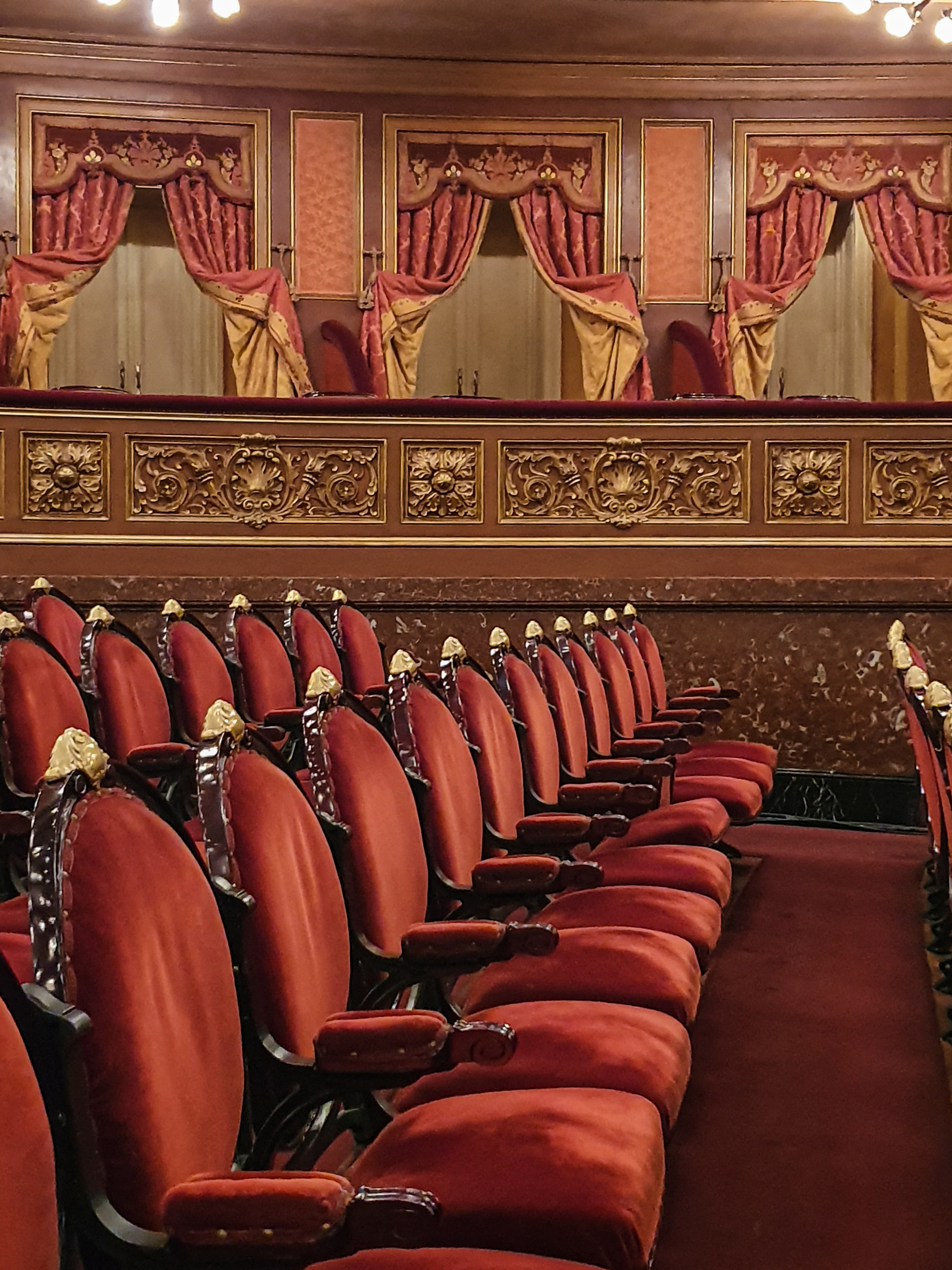
Concert hall seating

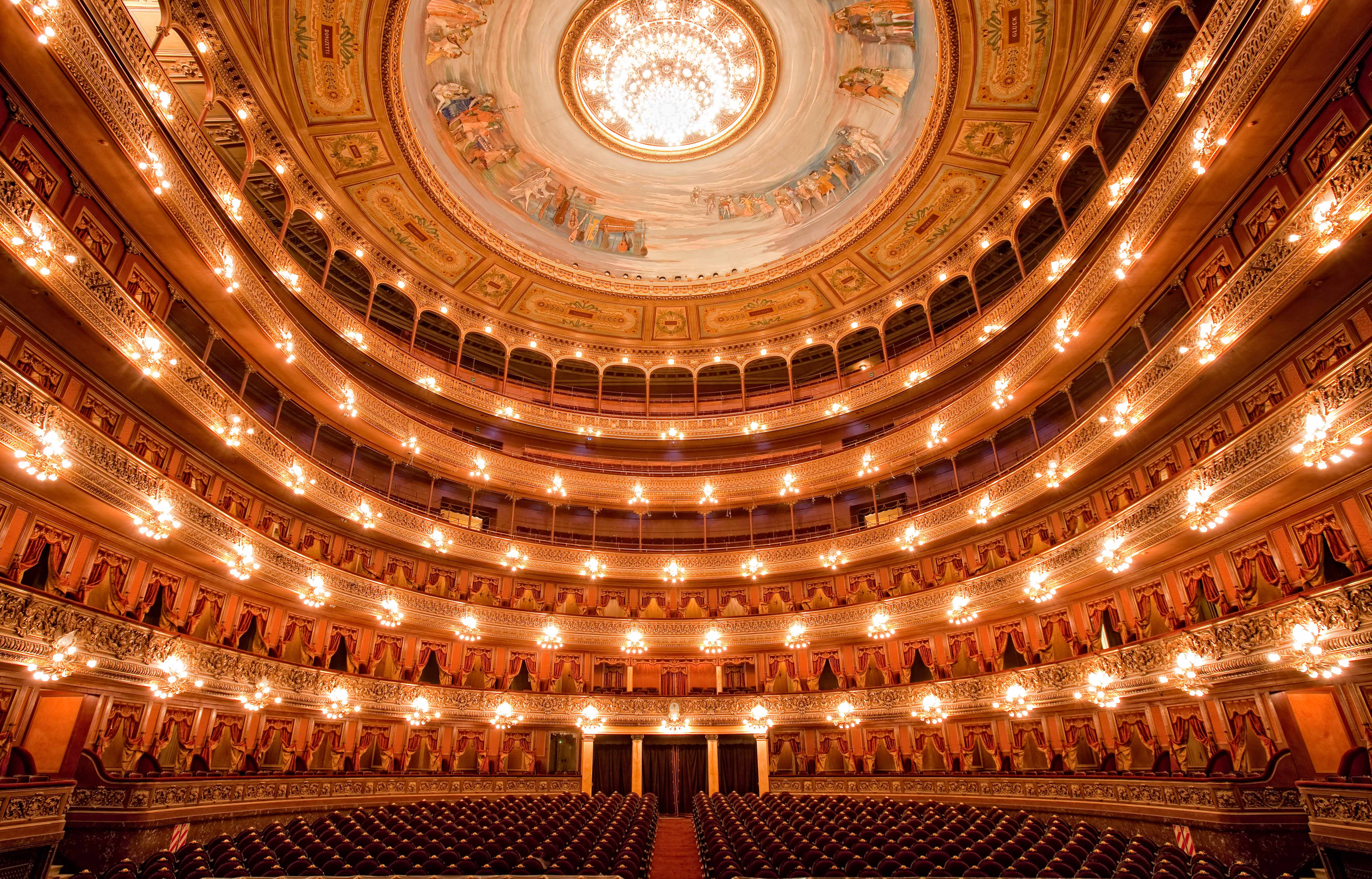
Room

Balconies

Stairs

Stained glass

== See also ==
- List of concert halls
- Libertad Palace
