= Argentine painting =

Argentina has a rich history of different types of art, which has changed throughout the centuries to become what it is today.

An Argentine painting refers to all the pictorial production done in the country of Argentina throughout the centuries.

== Pre-Columbian painting ==
Cueva de las Manos (Cave of the Hands), in Patagonia, Argentina, is an example of one such work. It has been declared a World Heritage Site by the UNESCO. Other important prehistoric artwork is located in the north of Córdoba. A collection of more than 35,000 pictographs (one of the densest collections of such images in the world) is found in the hills of Colorado, Veladero, Intihuasi and Unmount.

More recently, the pre-Hispanic cultures that inhabited the present territory of Argentina left a number of pictorial records. In the Andean northeast, the Ceramic Period cultures, from the Condorhuasi culture (400 BCE–700 CE) to the La Aguada (650–950 CE) and Santa María (1200–1470 CE), show a comprehensive development in the painting of ceramics and stone.

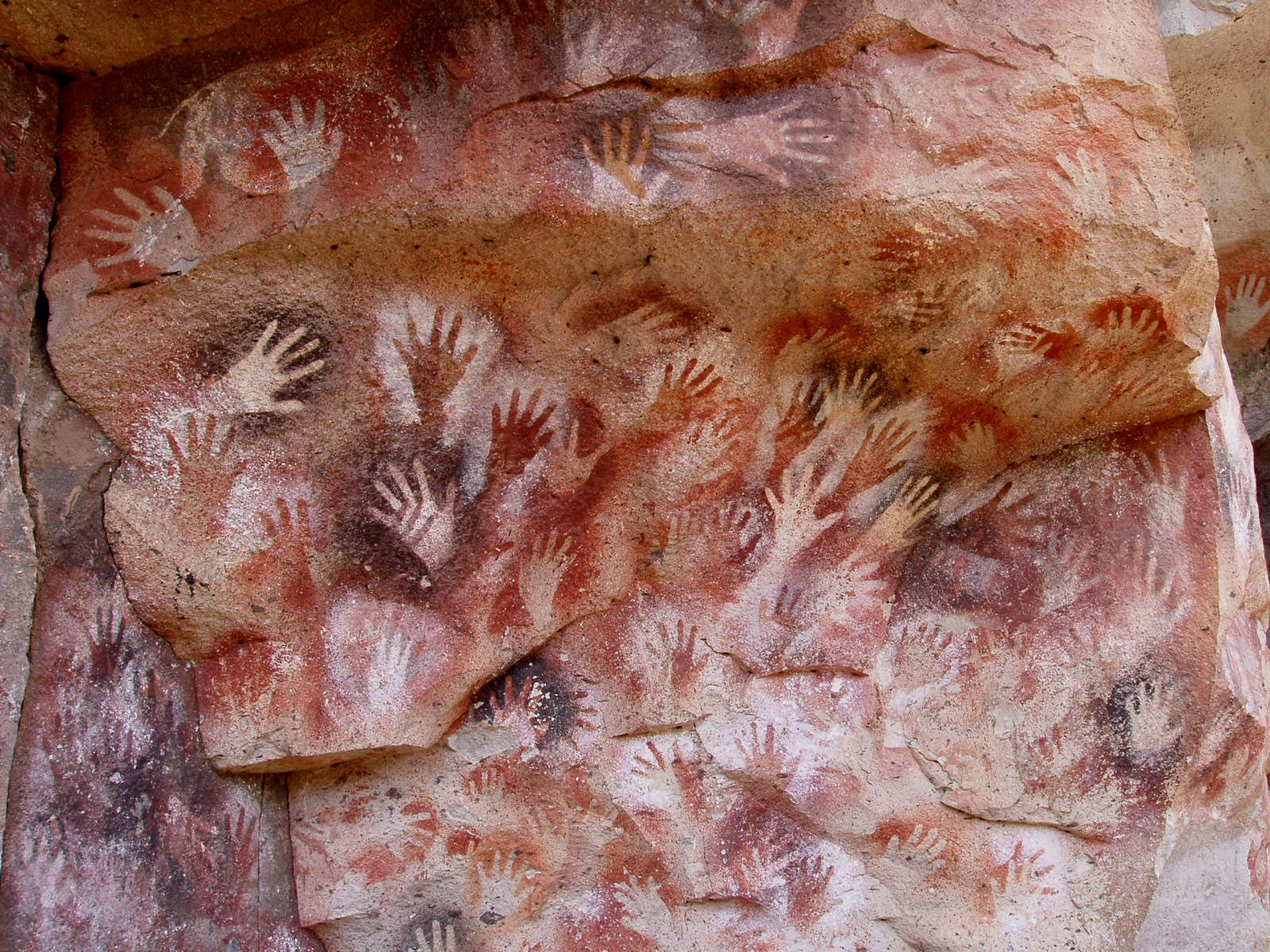
Cueva de las Manos (13,000–9,500 years ago)
Indigenous Inhabitants of Santa Cruz

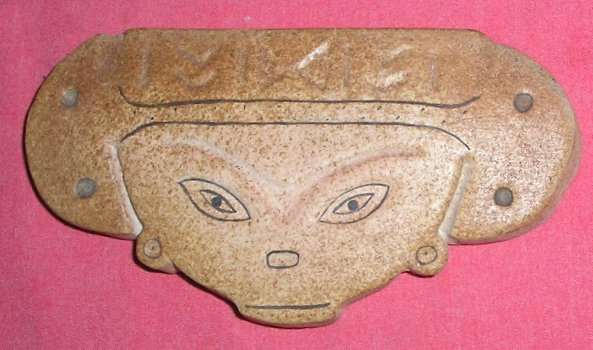
Feline Warrior (650-950 D.C.)
La Aguada Culture

== Colonial painting ==
During the Spanish colonial era, painting developed primarily as a religious art in churches, designed to Christianize indigenous peoples. Colonial-era religious painting was often done by forced indigenous artists and African slaves under the power of the religious orders.

Colonial painting is also seen in the books and manuscripts made by colonists, priests, scientists, and visitors. Notable among these are the drawings and watercolors of the German Jesuit Florian Paucke (1719–1789).

In what is now northwest Argentina, especially in Jujuy, the Cuzco School developed in the churches, with its images of ángeles arcabuceros (angels armed with Spanish colonial muskets) and triangular virgins (a syncretism of the cult of the Virgin Mary and the Pachamama).

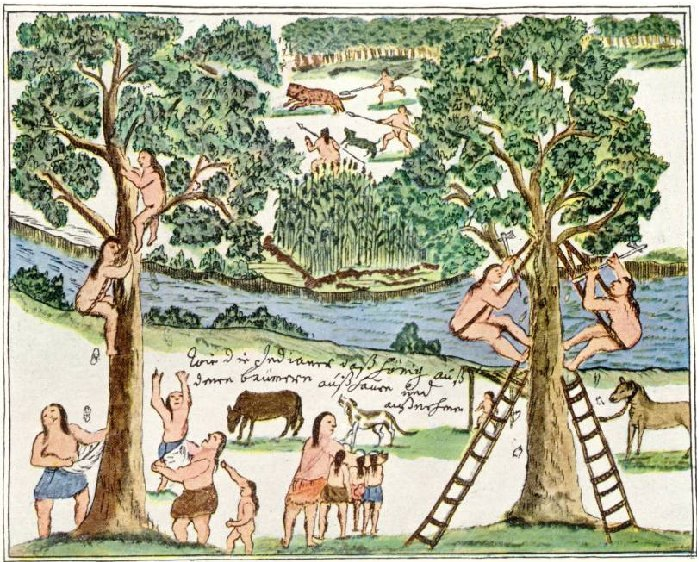
Taking honey down (1749–1767)
Florián Paucke

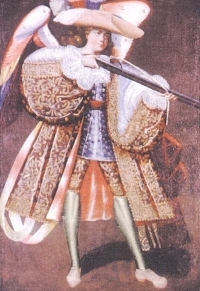
Military Angel (18th Century)
Mateo Pisarro

== Nineteenth century ==
In the first years of the 19th century, many foreign artists visited and resided in Argentina, leaving their works. Among them were English mariner Emeric Essex Vidal (1791–1861), a watercolorist who left important graphic evidence of Argentine history; French engineer Carlos E. Pellegrini (1800–1875), who was devoted to painting out of necessity and who would be the father of president Carlos Pellegrini; the mariner Adolfo D'Hastrel (1805–1875), who published his drawings and watercolors in the book Colección de vistas y costumbres del Río de la Plata (1875); and lithographer César Hipólito Bacle (1790–1838).

In the 1830s, Carlos Morel (1813–1894), considered the first strictly Argentine painter, came to prominence. Soon after followed Prilidiano Pueyrredón (1823–1870) and Cándido López (1840–1902), who painted the life of gauchos and the wars of premodern Argentina.

In the middle of the 19th century the first Argentine artistic institutions began to be organized. These included La Sociedad Estímulo de Bellas Artes and El Museo Nacional de Bellas Artes, whose first director was the painter Eduardo Schiaffino. The great wave of European immigration (1870–1930) established a strong relationship to European painting, mainly through Italian painters or children of Italians. Eduardo Sívori (1847–1918) introduced naturalism with works such as El despertar de la criada, followed by painters like Reinaldo Giudici (1853–1921) and Ernesto de la Cárcova (1866–1927), Ángel Della Valle (1852–1903) developed a painting movement depicting the customs of the countryside, with works like La vuelta del malón.

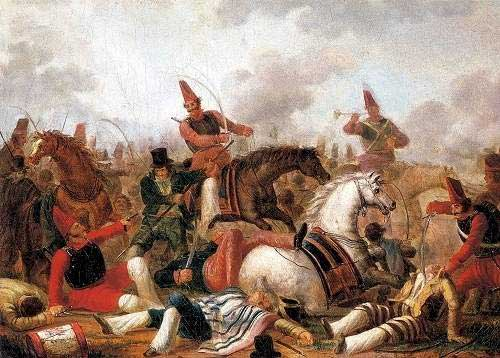
Battle of the Cavalry in the Time of Rosas (1830)
Carlos Morel

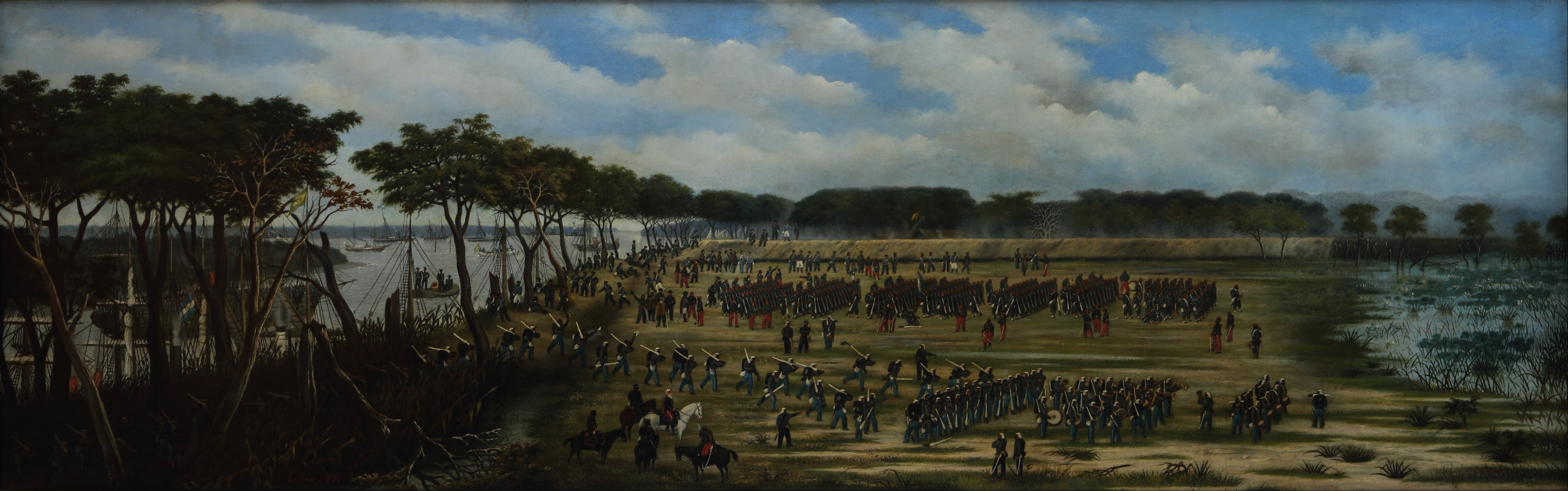
Disembarkation of Allied Troops (ca. 1860)
Cándido López

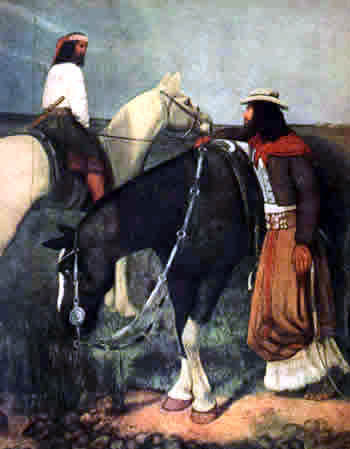
Field Foreman and Laborer (1864)
Prilidiano Pueyrredón

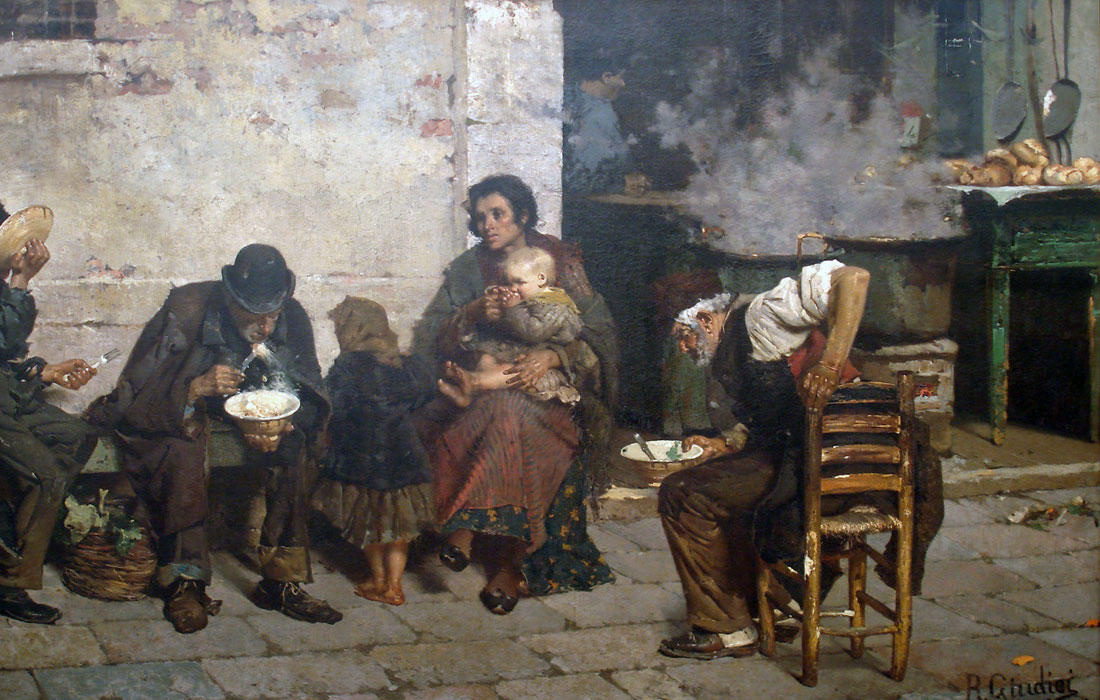
The Soup of the Poor (1884)
Reinaldo Giudici

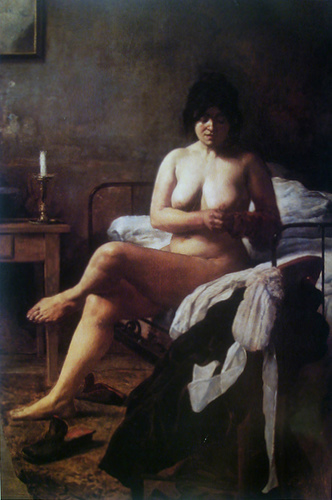
The Awakening of the Maid (1887)
Eduardo Sívori

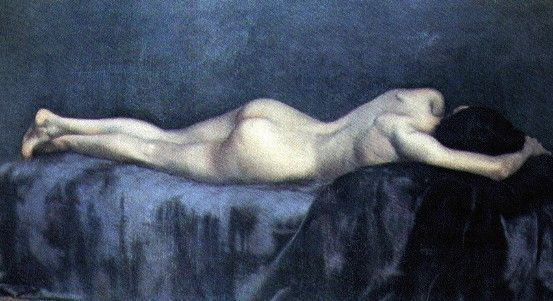
The repose (1889)
Eduardo Schiaffino

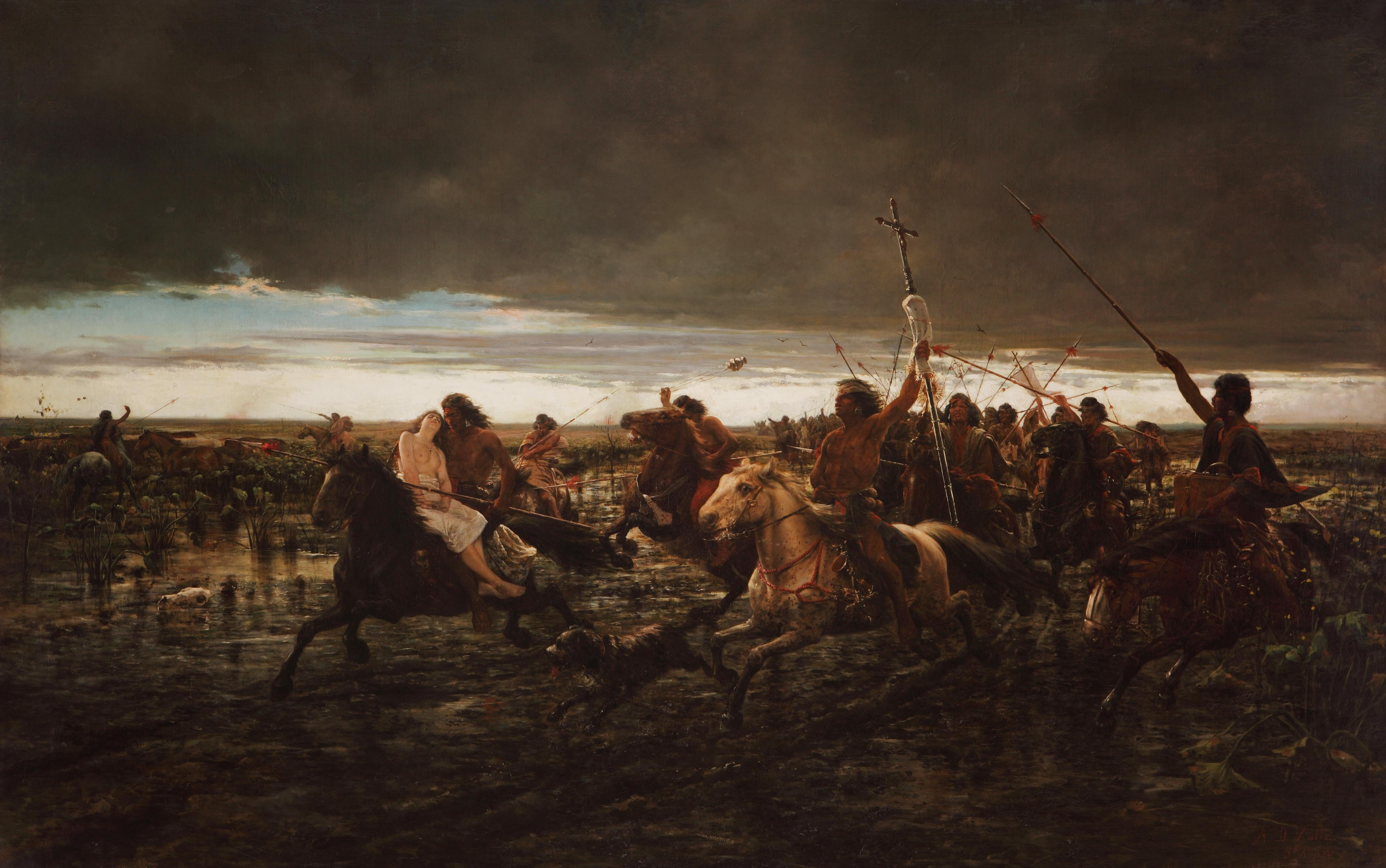
The Return of the Malón (1892)
Ángel Della Valle

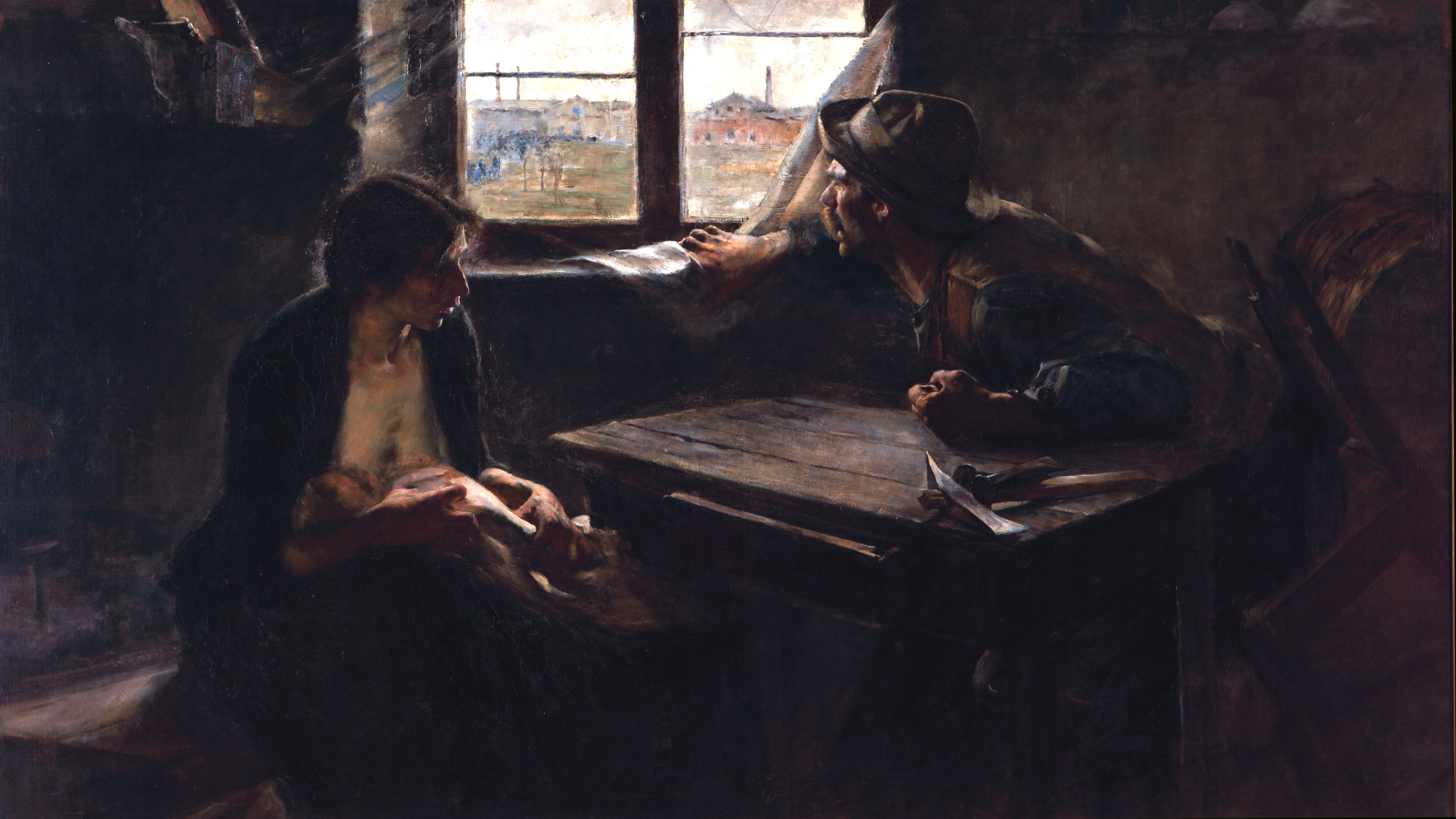
Without Bread and Without Work (1892–1893)
Ernesto de la Cárcova

== Twentieth century ==
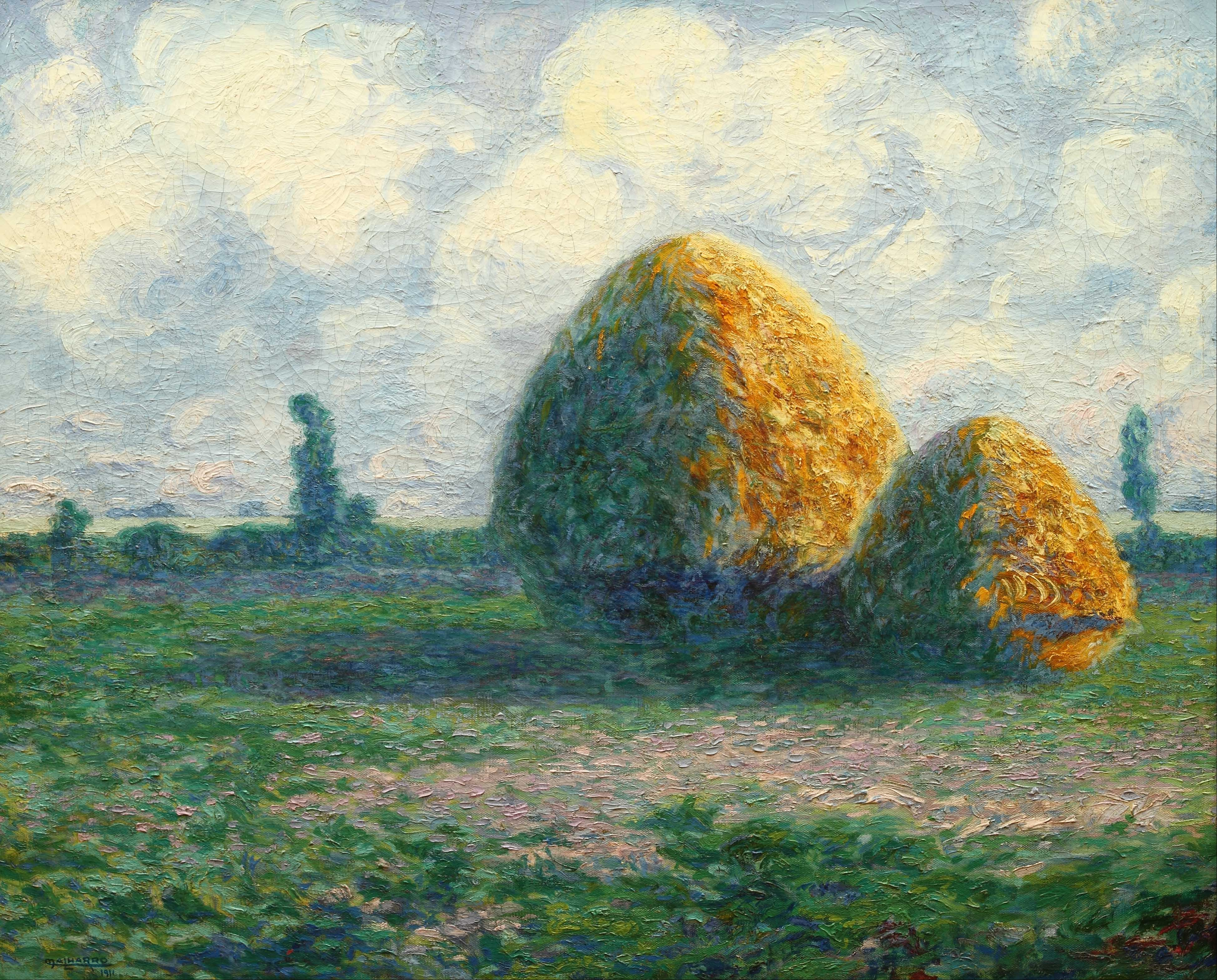
Martín Malharro, Las parvas (la pampa de hoy), 1885–1911, National Museum of Fine Arts, Buenos Aires

At a 1902 exhibition, Martín Malharro (1865–1911) introduced impressionism to Argentina. He was followed by painters including Faustino Brughetti (1877–1956), Walter de Navazio (1887–1919) and Ramón Silva (1890–1919). Soon after, Fernando Fader (1882–1935) and the artists of the Nexus group began to push for the development of artistic currents that, without ignoring or disavowing the painting fashionable in Paris, would be capable of expressing independent views of painting.

=== First avant-garde movement ===
The first major artistic movements in Argentina coincided with the first signs of political liberty in the country, such as the 1913 sanction of the secret ballot and universal male suffrage, the first president to be popularly elected (1916), and the cultural revolution that involved the University Reform of 1918. In this context, in which there continued to be influence from the Paris School (Modigliani, Chagall, Soutine, Klee), three main groups arose.

The Florida group was characterized by paying the highest attention to aesthetics. Its members generally belonged to the middle and upper classes. They met in the Richmond confectionery on the elegant and central calle Florida, from which the group takes its name. Its painters included Aquiles Badi, Héctor Basaldúa, Antonio Berni, Norah Borges, Horacio Butler, Emilio Centurión, Juan del Prete, Raquel Forner, Ramón Gomez Cornet, Alfredo Guttero, Emilio Pettoruti, Xul Solar, and Lino Enea Spilimbergo.

The Boedo group took social issues and struggles as its central themes. El Grupo Boedo, with painters such as José Arato, Adolfo Bellocq, Guillermo Hebécquer and Abraham Vigo. They were centered on the socialist Claridad publishing house, which had its workshops on calle Boedo, in the working-class suburbs of the city. Boedo group painters included José Arato, Adolfo Bellocq, Guillermo Hebécquer, and Abraham Vigo.

The La Boca group was strongly influenced by Italian immigration and developed a distinctive style centered on labor and immigrant neighborhoods. These artists included Victor Cúnsolo, Eugenio Daneri, Fortunato Lacámera, Alfredo Lazzari, Benito Quinquela Martín, and Miguel Carlos Victorica.

=== Second avant-garde movement ===
In the second avant-garde movement, or the wave of innovations in Argentine painting developed in the 1930s, many painters of the first avant-garde movement evolved and changed their artistic position. Among the leading artistic groups were:

- The Orion Group, composed of Luis Barragán, Vicente Forte, and Leopoldo Presas, among others.
- The Sensitive painters, characterized by the use of color as an emotional tool. Raúl Soldi was the most prominent of this group; others included Miguel Carlos Victorica, Raúl Russo, Eugenio Daneri, and Miguel Diómede.
- The Naive painters, whose paintings forwent human or social conflicts, such as Luis Centurión and Norah Borges.
- The neo-realists, who in some ways continued the line of the Boedo group, but with strict pictorial and avant-garde elements. This group includes Carlos Alonso, Antonio Berni, Juan Carlos Castagnino, Demetrio Urruchúa, Enrique Policastro. Florencio Molina Campos and Medardo Pantoja can also be included in the group. Campos for his naive painting of social elements via caricature and the use of "significant" color; and Pantoja whose painting was inspired by the indigenous Andean and Latin American cultures.

=== Escuela de Muralistas Tucumanos School Tucumano muralists ===
From 1946 there is a shift in the academic policy of the Schools of Fine Arts of Argentina, to the sound of Argentine teachers political apartments expelled from other schools of fine arts as Mendoza and Buenos Aires. Since 1946 was a turning point in the academic policy of the schools of Fine Arts of Argentina, the apartments are of the Argentine political masters Expelled from other schools of fine arts as Mendoza and Buenos Aires. In 1948 he organized the painting workshop at the Higher Institute of Arts of the National University of Tucumán under the leadership of Enes Lino Spilimbergo and Guido Parpagnoli address, where he formed a plastic pole Argentina of great interest with leading artists : Tucumanos Muralistas School, inspired by the teachings of Lothe and Ghyka Matyla harmonic principles. In 1948 it Organized the paint shop of the Superior Institute of Arts of the National University of Tucumán led by Enes Lino Spilimbergo and direction of Guido Parpagnoli, que Formed plastic one pole of the Argentina of great interest to the Most outstanding artists: School Tucumano muralists, inspired by the Teachings and principles of Lothar Matyla Ghyka harmonics. The project of the Higher Institute of Arts in different disciplines joined Lorenzo Dominguez for the section of sculpture, printmaking and Víctor Rebuffo in Zurro Pedro de la Fuente in matalistería. Ramón Gómez Cornet and cartoonists Lajos Szalay and Aurelio Salas also participated in this project with Carlos Alonso, Juan Carlos de la Motta, Eduardo Audivert, Leonor Vassena, Alfredo Portillos, Medardo Pantoja, Luis Lobo de la Vega, Mercedes Romero, Nieto Palacios and others. The project of the Higher Institute of Arts joined in various disciplines: Lorenzo Dominguez for the section of sculpture, Víctor Rebuffo recorded in Zurro and Pedro de la Fuente in matalistería. Ramón Gómez Cornet and cartoonists Lajos Szalay and Aurelio Salas Also participated In this endeavor Along with Carlos Alonso, Juan Carlos de la Motta, Eduardo Audivert, Leonor Vassena, Alfredo Portillo, Medardo Pantoja, Luis Lobo de la Vega, Mercedes Romero, Nieto Palacios et al.

=== "Modern" painters ===
Argentina's "modern painters" are a difficult group to define. They have developed a constructivist rather than figurative style, though it is not quite abstract. Artists of this group include Julio Barragán, Luis Seoane, Carlos Torrallardona, Luis Aquino, Atilio Malinverno, and Alfredo Gramajo Gutiérrez.

=== Abstract art ===
Juan Del Prete (later the creator of Futucubismo, a mixture of Cubism and Futurism) came from the abstract art movement in Argentina, which developed in the 1940s from, of course, concrete art. Tomás Maldonado is one of the most well known abstract artists.

=== Madí Movement ===
The Madí Movement, began in Argentina in 1946. One source claims Madí was founded in protest to the government control of the arts under Juan Perón. while a different source says that Madí is not necessarily a response to that oppression. The movement spread to Europe and later the United States. It is considered the only artistic movement founded in Buenos Aires to have a significant impact internationally. It was founded by Gyula Kosice and Carmelo Arden Quin, and included artists such as Rhod Rothfuss, Martín Blaszko, Waldo Longo, and Diyi Laañ.

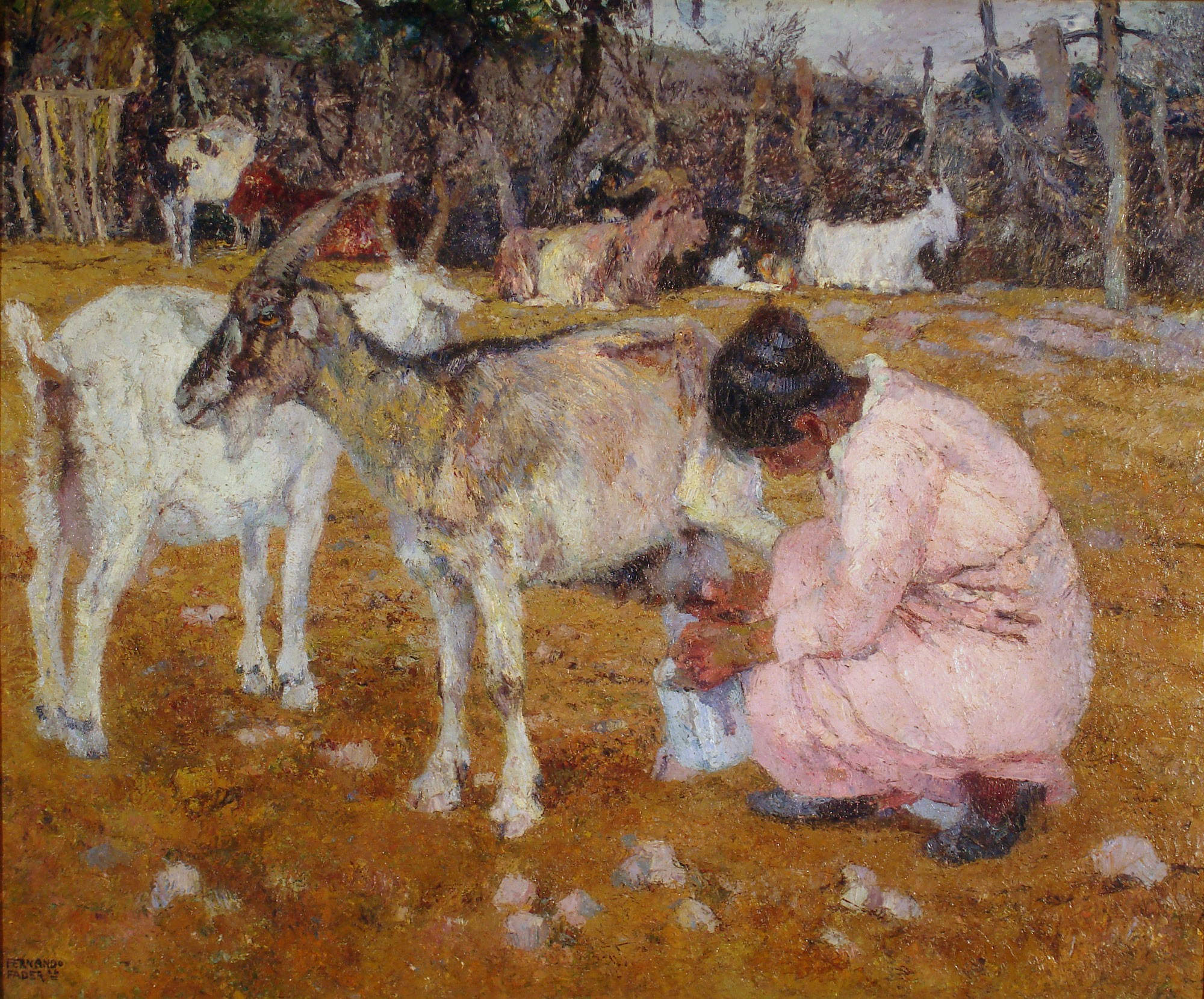
Goat pen (1926)
Fernando Fader

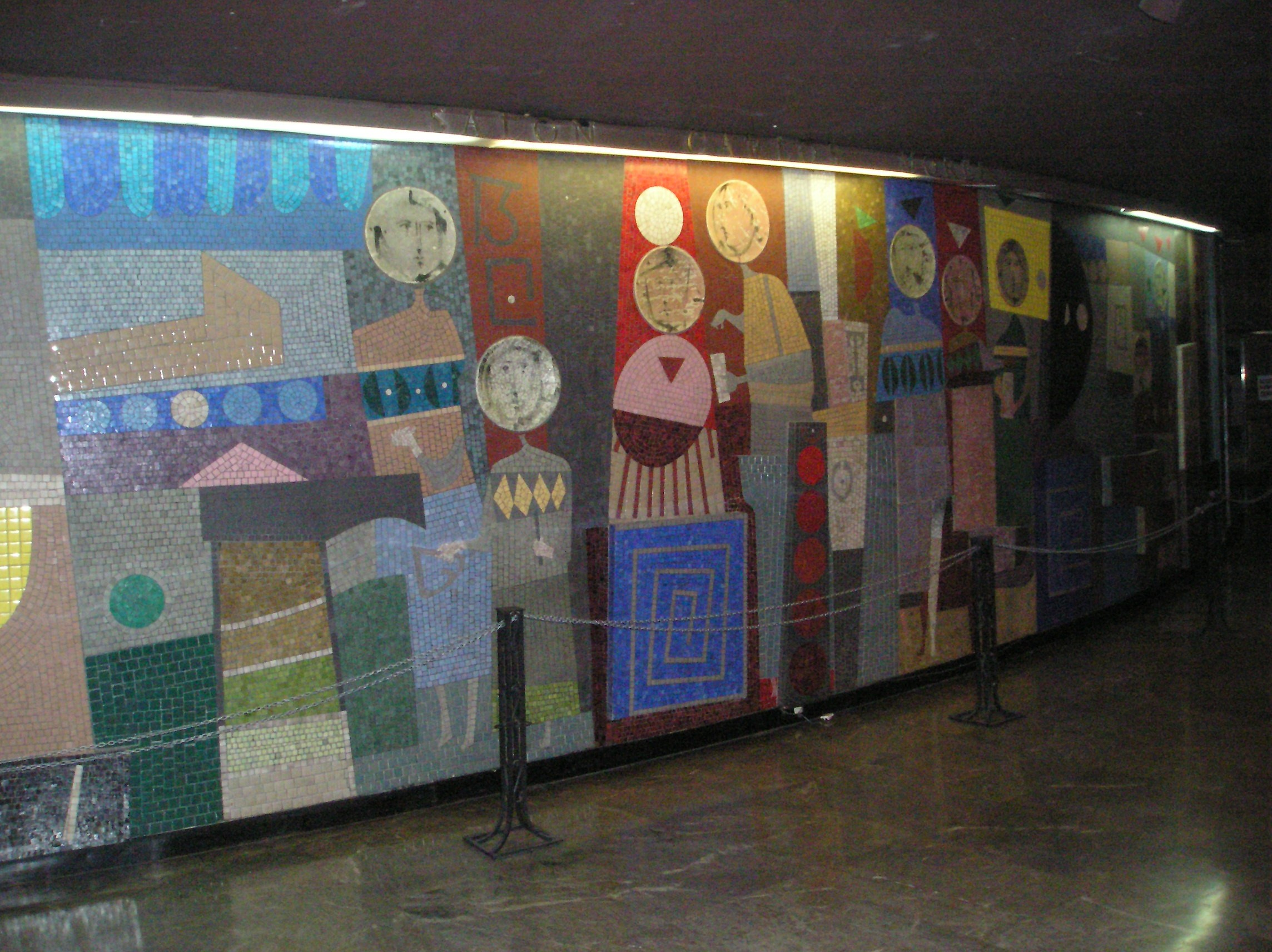
Mural in the San Martín Theatre, Buenos Aires
Juan Batlle Planas

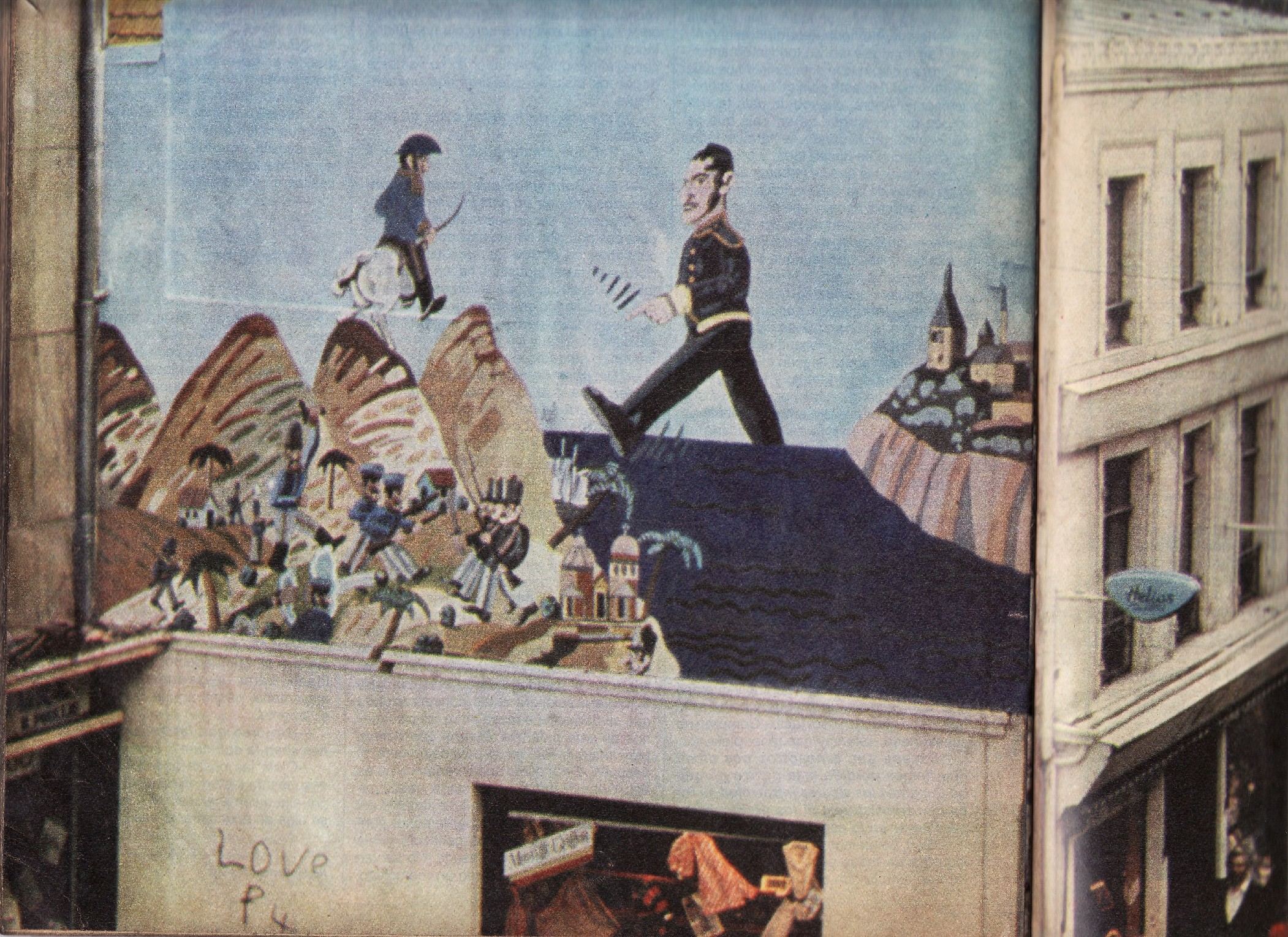
Mural about José de San Martín in Boulogne-sur-Mer, France
Antonio Seguí

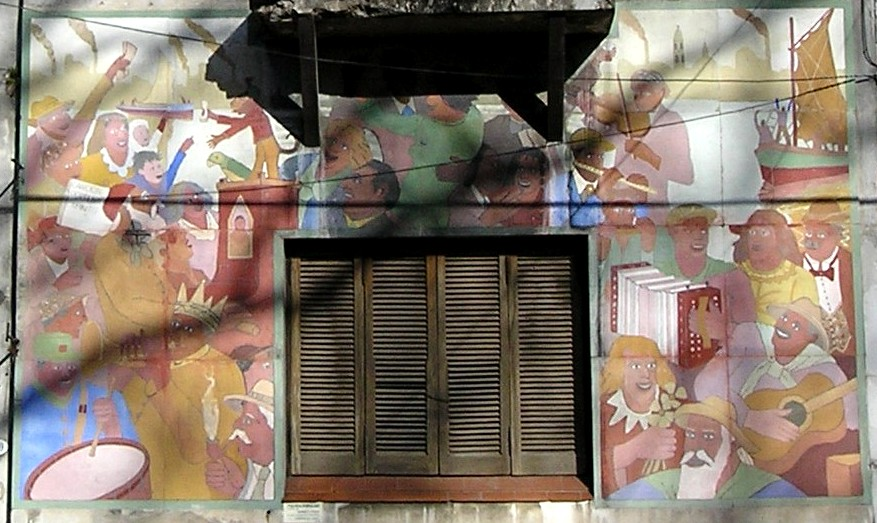
The popular song
Benito Quinquela Martín

== Recent trends ==
Among the latest trends in Argentine painting are new figurativism, pop art, new surrealism, hyperrealism, systems art, new abstract art, kinetic art, and ephemeral art.

New Figurativism, formed in the 1960s,

La Nueva Figuración, reunió en la década del 60, varios artistas que adoptaron el nombre de "Otra Figuración", que recuperan la figura humana, pero con el fin de darle formas libres, muchas veces monstruosas y cadavéricas. The New Figuration, met in the decade of 60, several artists who adopted the name "Another Figuration," recovering the human figure, but in order to give free-form, often monstrous and corpses. Los artistas más destacados de esta corriente son Jorge de la Vega, Rómulo Macció, Luis Felipe Noé, Antonio Seguí, Miguel Á. The most prominent artists of this current is Jorge de la Vega, Rómulo Macció, Luis Felipe Noé, Antonio Seguí, Miguel Á. Dávila, Juan Carlos Distéfano.

The New Figuration brought together in the 60s, several artists who adopted the name "Other Figuration", which recover the human figure, but in order to give free, often monstrous and cadaverous forms. The New Figuration, which met in the 60s, several artists who adopted the name "Another Figuration," recovering the human figure, but in order to give free-form, often monstrous and corpses. The most outstanding artists of this current are Jorge de la Vega, Rómulo Macció, Luis Felipe Noé, Antonio Seguí, Miguel Á. The most prominent artists of this current are Jorge de la Vega, Rómulo Macció, Luis Felipe Noé, Antonio Seguí, Miguel Á. Dávila, Juan Carlos Distéfano. Davila, Juan Carlos Distefano.

Argentine neosurrealism includes painters such as Guillermo Roux and Roberto Aizenberg. In their art they express human anguish in times of great social and political unrest.

The Spartacus Group (Grupo Espartaco) was founded by Ricardo Carpani, Juan Manuel Sánchez, and Mario Mollari, among others. It linked painting to active engagement with social struggles, unions in particular. Their esthetic is integrated into the traditions of South America.

A partir de la noción de "sistema", derivada de la ciencia cibernética, desde comienzos de la década del 70, varios artistas y especialistas en Comunicación, desarrollaron una corriente denominada Arte de Sistema, expresándose de maneras diversas bajo denominaciones como "arte conceptual", "arte ecológico de la tierra", "arte pobre", "arte de proposiciones" y "arte cibernético". Since the notion of "system", derived from the science cybernetics, from the early 70s, several artists and specialists in communication, develop a stream called the System of Art, expressed in different ways under names such as "conceptual art" "Eco Art of the Earth", "poor art", "Art of propositions" and "cyber-art." Algunos de los artistas argentinos de esta corriente son Luis Fernando Benedit, Nicolás Dermisache y Lea Lublin . Some of the artists are aware of this Argentinian Luis Fernando Benedit, Nicholas Dermisache and Lea Lublin.

From the notion of "system", derived from cybernetic science, since the beginning of the 70s, several artists and specialists in Communication, developed a current called System Art, expressing themselves in different ways under denominations such as "conceptual art", "ecological art of the earth", "poor art", "art of propositions" and "cybernetic art". Since the notion of "system", derived from the science of cybernetics, from the early 70s, several artists and specialists in communication, develop a stream called the System of Art, expressed in different ways under names such as "conceptual art" "Eco Art of the Earth "," poor art "," Art of propositions "and" cyber-art. " Some of the Argentine artists of this current are Luis Fernando Benedit, Nicolás Dermisache and Lea Lublin. Some of the artists are aware of this Argentinian Luis Fernando Benedit, Nicholas Dermisache and Lea Lublin.

Derived from the Happening movement, Marta Minujín has developed a type of art called "ephemeral art."

The art of León Ferrari has stood out in recent times. Ferrari received the Golden Lion prize at the 2007 Venice Biennial and is considered among the few most important living painters.
