= Juana Lumerman =

Argentine artist (1905–1982)

- Born: 1905; Buenos Aires, Argentina
- Died: 1982 (aged 76–77)
- Known for: Painting

Juana Lumerman (1905 – 1982) was an Argentine visual artist who painted in both figurative and abstract styles.

Lumerman graduated with a degree in painting in 1935 from the National Academy of Fine Arts in Buenos Aires. Lumerman studied there with European trained teachers including Aquiles Badi known for his Constructivist and metaphysical tendencies and es:Emilio Centurion known for his command of volumes and form, as well as with Carlos P. Ripamonte a painter of an earlier generation known for his work in an Impressionist vein.

In 1936, Lumerman won first prize in the VI Feminine Salon of Fine Arts in Buenos Aires. In a 1993 essay, art historian Cesar Magrini evokes the period and describes Lumerman as "...a pioneer and an explorer of new paths. Those were years when one could count on the fingers of one hand those women who were permitted to paint, model or sculpt without its being considered a perversion."

By the early 1940s, Juana Lumerman was showing her painting in Buenos Aires with a mixed group of her accomplished peers. In 1941, Los Angeles County Museum of Art invited several Argentine artists to represent their country in a US exhibition; the group included Lino Enea Spilimbergo, Raquel Forner, Ramón Gomez Cornet, Antonio Berni, Emilio Pettoruti and Juana Lumerman.

In 1945, Juana Lumerman spent a year exhibiting, traveling and working in Brazil. Throughout Lumerman's career, dynamic images of carnival, football and tango were to serve as counterpoints to more statically structured, more metaphysical, cityscape and still life themes in her painting.

In 1948, Juana Lumerman traveled to Washington, DC for another invitational show and then toured the US. In 1950, the artist traveled to northern Argentina where much of Buenos Aires' intelligentsia had decamped in an attempt to avoid the constraints of Juan Perón's visual aesthetic.

Despite her travels to Brazil and to Argentina's colorful northern provinces, Lumerman's palette tended to be cool and tonally somber. The artist typically painted easel-size works in oil on board or canvas using a loosely figurative style notable for its fluidity of line and skillful paint handling.

In a 1952 article the British fine art magazine "The Studio" names Juana Lumerman, Raquel Forner and es:Mane Bernardo as the three key women in Argentina's visual arts scene.

Possibly by choice (?), Juana Lumerman exhibited rarely in subsequent years, with notable exceptions being a solo show at the respected Van Riel Gallery in 1967 and a prestigious 1968 Salon Estimulo show with Argentine masters and contemporary artists including Carlos Alonso, Juan Carlos Castagnino, Riganelli, Policastro, Carlos Ripamonte Berni and Raúl Soldi. In a 1978 newspaper interview, art critic Hugo Monzon quotes Juana Lumerman as saying: "I have always worked. I wish (now) that people might know my things, to break away from modestly, because ones work makes one naked."

Juana Lumerman painted in her studio on Paraguay Street in downtown Buenos Aires until her death in 1982.
