= Atilio Malinverno =

Argentine painter

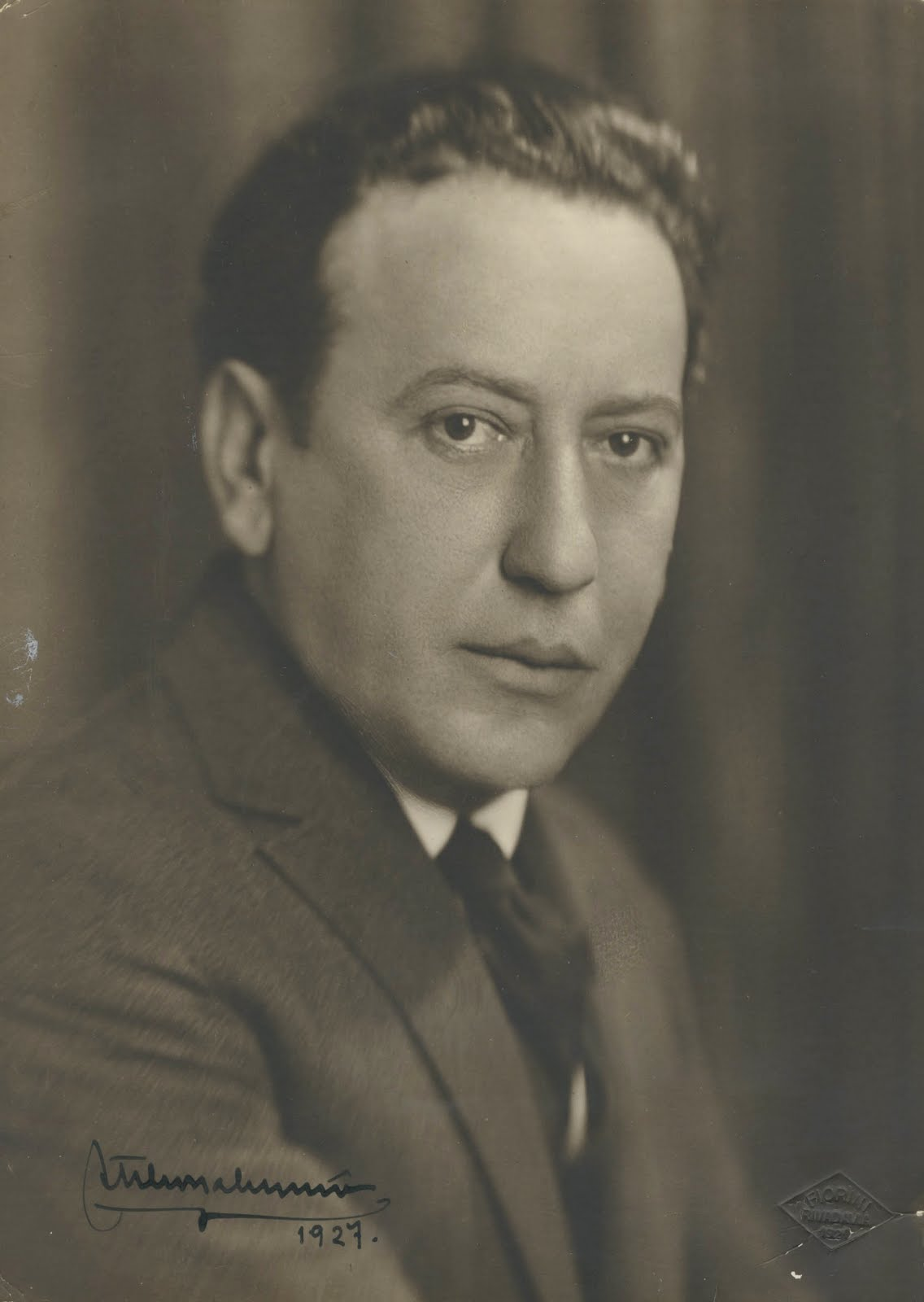
- Malinverno (1927)
- Born: April 20, 1890; Buenos Aires (Argentina)
- Died: June 21, 1936 (aged 46); Buenos Aires
- Occupation: Painter
- Notable work: Los Eucaliptos

Atilio Malinverno (Buenos Aires, April 20, 1890 – June 21, 1936) was an Argentine painter. He was a post-Impressionist, a part of a movement started in the first year of the 20th century.

Known as "the philosopher of trees", he devoted himself exclusively to landscape painting in his free time from working in his advertising agency. The main topics of his works were the hills of Córdoba, the Pampas plains, the mountains of Tandil, the coast of Quilmes, the ravines of San Isidro beside the Río de la Plata, and Piriapolis in Uruguay.

He moved for a period to the Córdoba hills, painting in the open air, and on returning to Buenos Aires staged exhibitions at which he successfully sold all his works.

He studied art at the Asociación de Estímulo de Bellas Artes (Fine Arts Association), and made several trips to study art in the Argentine interior, Bolivia, Chile and Uruguay.

== Biography ==
Malinverno and daughters

Malinverno was born in Buenos Aires on 20 April 1890. He studied at the Fine Arts Association with teachers Reinaldo Giudici, Ernesto de la Cárcova and Eduardo Sívori. In 1910 at the age of 20, he submitted a work at the Centennial International Exhibition. Exhibitions devoted to his own work were held at the Salón Castellani in Rosario in 1919 and 1921, and at the National Commission of Fine Arts in 1921. The next year he won the Silver Medal in the National Exhibition of Decorative Art, and made his first journey to the mountains of Córdoba, including their scenery in his work. He held another individual exhibition at the Cultural Association of Bahia Blanca in the hall of the Municipal Palace in December. In 1923 he took part in the sixth Salón de Otoño exhibition in Rosario. Awards included Gold Medal at the Centenary Exhibition in Tandil (1923), Bronze Medal at the Community Exhibition (1924), and the Estímulo del Salón Nacional prize (1927). Later individual exhibitions were mounted at the Friends of Art Association in Buenos Aires in 1928, and at the Witcomb Hall in Buenos Aires in 1930. He died in Buenos Aires on 21 June 1936. A large posthumous exhibition was mounted the following year at the Müller Gallery, organized by a committee of homage chaired by his favorite disciple, actor and painter Enrique Muiño.

More recently his work has featured repeatedly in exhibitions at the Alvear de Zurbarán Collection in Buenos Aires: individual exhibitions in 1986, 1991, 1994 and 1998, and as part of collective exhibitions in 1982 and 1997. Also in 1986 his work was included in the "Italian Roots in Argentine Art" exhibition at the Estudio de Buenos Aires.

== Present displays ==
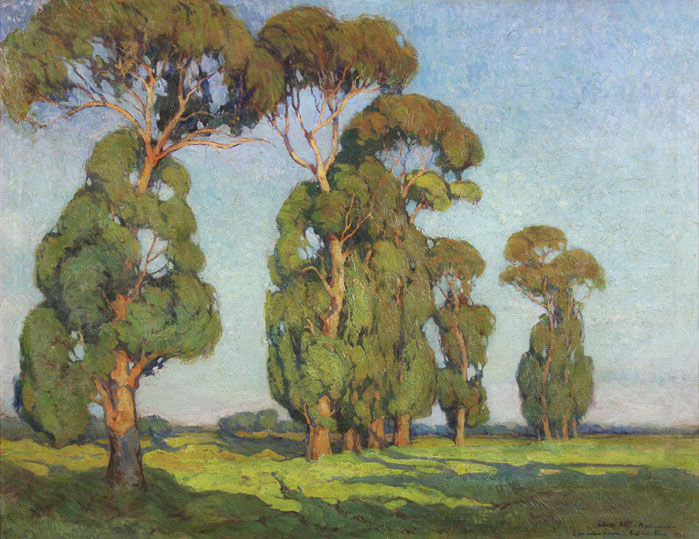
Los Eucaliptos, by Malinverno

Malinverno's work is on display at:

- Blue Room of the Casa Rosada presidential palace, Buenos Aires
- Permanent collection, Museo de Arte del Tigre
- Eduardo Sívori Museum, Buenos Aires
- Museo Nacional de Bellas Artes, Buenos Aires
- Museo de Arte Hispanoamericano Isaac Fernandez Blanco, Buenos Aires
