= Eolo Pons =

Argentine painter

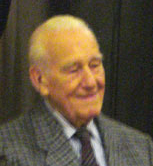
Eolo Pons

Eolo Pons (1914–2009) was an Argentine painter.

Eolo Pons was born in Buenos Aires. He studied from 1935-38 in the studio of the influential Argentine painter and teacher Lino Enea Spilimbergo; among Pons' fellow students were his close friends figurative painters Leopoldo Presas (b. 1915) and Luis Lusnich (1911–1995). Subsequently, Eolo Pons worked in the printmaking studio of Surrealist graphic artists Jose Planas Casas (1900–1960), Juan Batlle Planas (1911–1966) and Pompeyo Audivert (1900–1977).

Eolo Pons' work is sometimes associated with that of his philosophical mentor Carlos Giambiagi (1887–1965), a native of Uruguay who was known for his writings on art and aesthetics and for his small paintings of Misiones Province landscapes. From 1958-1964, together with indigenous painter Medardo Pantoja (1906–1976), Jorge Gnecco (1914–1965), and Luis Pellegrini, Eolo Pons established and taught at the Provincial Fine Arts School of Jujuy, in the Andean northwest of Argentina.

Tightly structured with carefully orchestrated color, Eolo Pons' landscapes, cityscapes and figurative works evoke, rather than describe, the nature and culture of his native Argentina. Eolo Pons' paintings and drawings retain the influence of Surrealism. "Long ago in the year 1939, Eolo Pons introduced himself into the surrealist garden with the same discipline and respect he had given his academic training. The surrealism of Pons made incursions into the world of dreams, into the Freudian subconscious, being there he delved deeply into all the nooks and crannies of its purest orthodoxy. But afterwards these sub-real images remained in the background ignored because the artist chose not to borrow his fantasies from others. Still, the exercise that had driven Pons to excavate the mysterious served him in seeking out the soul of things, smoothing the way for him, by virtue of his technical resources and his never-abused and never-forgotten manual education. This man, who had spent time in the stillness and in the depths, knew that not all mystery is a dream. And thus, he set himself to look for that which hides in the landscape, that which floats in the unbounded atmosphere of a happy day, that which slips between words in order not to state aloud an intention or a sentiment.

In the landscapes of Eolo Pons, and in his figures, come and go the evocation of a mystery—a mystery that, perhaps, opens to us the doors of the landscape and brings us into the souls of the people. The sure thing is that we see it and feel it, as we see and feel the night in its most profound silence, as we see and feel the advance of a shadow as it crosses the path of a dream." – Rodrigo Bonome, Eolo Pons, Buenos Aires, 1973 (translated from the original Spanish).

He died in Buenos Aires on October 28, 2009.

== Bibliography ==
- Fabiana Mastrangelo, “Dialogo con Eolo Pons” and cover image, PROA, Edicíon Especial en Las Letras y en Las Artes, 2007, No.67.
- Diana B. Wechsler, “Eolo Pons”, La Vida de Emma en El Taller de Spilimbergo, (Buenos Aires: Fundacíon Osde, 2006) 76-78, 84-89.
- María Laura San Martín, Breve Historia de la Pintura Argentina Contemporanea, (Buenos Aires: Editorial Claridad, 1993) 273.
- Carlos Giambiagi, Reflexiones de un Pintor, (Buenos Aires: Editorial Stilcograf, 1972) 294-310.
