= Carlos P. Ripamonte =

Argentine painter

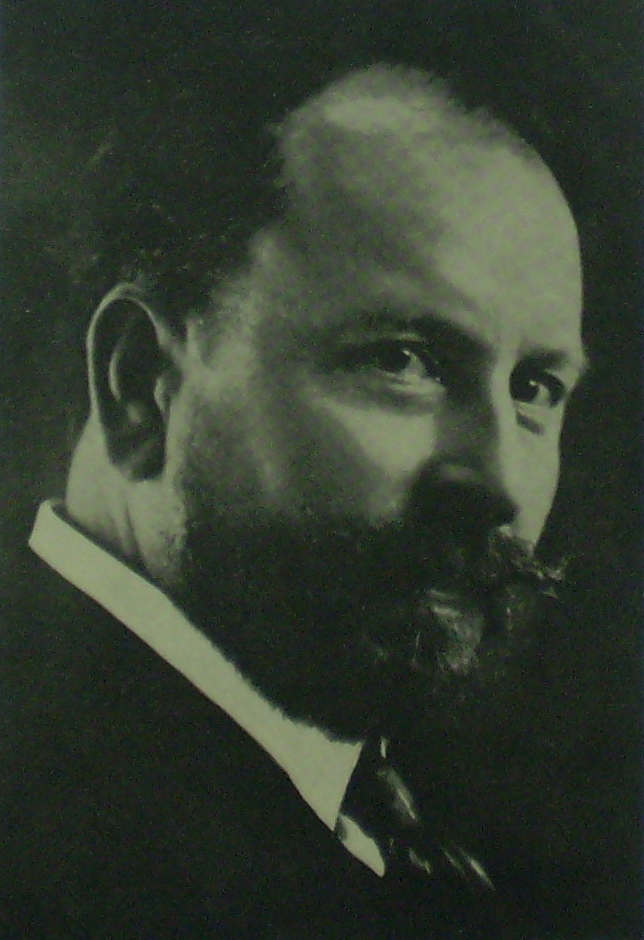
- Born: May 4, 1874; Buenos Aires, Argentina
- Died: August 14, 1968 (aged 94); Villa Ballester, Province of Buenos Aires, Argentina
- Known for: Painter
- Notable work: Canciones del Pago (1910)
- Awards: First Prize, International Centennial Exposition of 1910

Carlos Pablo Ripamonte (Buenos Aires, May 4, 1874 – Villa Ballester, August 14, 1968) was an Argentine painter.

== Early life and artistic formation ==
Carlos Ripamonte was born in Buenos Aires to Mateo Ripamonte, an Italian immigrant, and Mercedes Toledo, an Argentine from Córdoba.

Ripamonte began his artistic studies under portraitist Juan Bautista Curet Cenet, later attending the studio of Italian painter Miguel Carmine. Afterward, at the urging of his mentor he entered the Society for the Stimulus of Fine Arts (a precursor of the National Association of Fine Arts), where his artistic guides included Reynaldo Giudici, Ángel Della Valle y Ernesto de la Cárcova. He taught Drawing there from 1897 to 1899, when the national government awarded him a grant to study in Italy.

Ripamonte (left) in his Rome studio, 1905.

In Rome he opened a studio and learned from the master Giulio Aristide Sartorio. Sartorio, said Ripamonte, "was my true maestro." A painting he submitted to the 1904 St. Louis World's Fair was awarded a medal.

== Return to Argentina ==
Returning to Argentina in 1905, Ripamonte undertook the position of Secretary of the Society for the Stimulus of Fine Arts, where he also taught as a professor.

Soon thereafter, in league with other emerging Argentine artists — Pío Collivadino, Cesáreo Bernaldo de Quirós, Fernando Fader, Ceferino Carnacini, Justo Lynch, Alberto María Rossi, and sculptors Rogelio Yrurtia and Antonio Dresco — several of whom had been in Rome with him at the same time, Ripamonte formed the Nexus Group, an artistic collective dedicated to developing Argentine national themes in a post-Impressionst idiom. When Nexus held its first exposition, which opened on September 23, 1907, the critical reviews were highly positive but, as Ripamonte later recalled, almost no works were sold. In the same year, de la Cárcova left his post as vice-director of the National Academy of Fine Arts and Ripamonte succeeded him; he would continue to hold the position until 1928.

In 1910, the International Centennial Exposition was held in Argentina, and a great number of artworks were shown. Among the 235 works by Argentine artists, those of the Nexus Group occupied a distinguished place; Ripamonte was awarded first prize in the Costumbrismo category for his oil on canvas entitled Canciones del Pago. From 1911, Ripamonte submitted work to the National Salon and other official shows in Argentina. He had solo and group shows at galleries such as Galería Witcomb, Müller, Salón Mar del Plata, and Salón Santa Fe.

Together with Francisco Pascasio Moreno and other notable figures, Ripamonte founded the Asociación de Boy Scouts Argentinos on July 4, 1912.

Ripamonte authored numerous articles and other works on art, including the books Janus: Consideraciones y Reflexiones Artísticas (1926) and Vida: Causas y Efectos de la Evolución Artística (1930).

== Later years ==
In addition to maintaining his artistic output, Ripamonte continued teaching and held numerous official positions, such as that of president of the Society for the Stimulus of Fine Arts and member of the National Commission on Fine Arts. He was director of the Ernesto de La Cárcova Higher School of Fine Arts in Buenos Aires from 1928 until 1931, and continued to teach until his retirement in 1942.

For much of his later life Ripamonte lived in Villa Ballester, a northern suburb of Buenos Aires, counting among his neighbors his student and colleague Ceferino Carnacini. His home and studio remain standing and are occupied by his descendants.

Ripamonte's works number among the collections of national and provincial museums as well as notable private collectors. Retrospectives and homages to Ripamonte have been held at the Carnacini House Museum in Villa Ballester in 2008, and at the National Museum of Fine Arts in Buenos Aires in 2018.
