= Ramón Gómez Cornet =

Argentine painter (1898–1964)

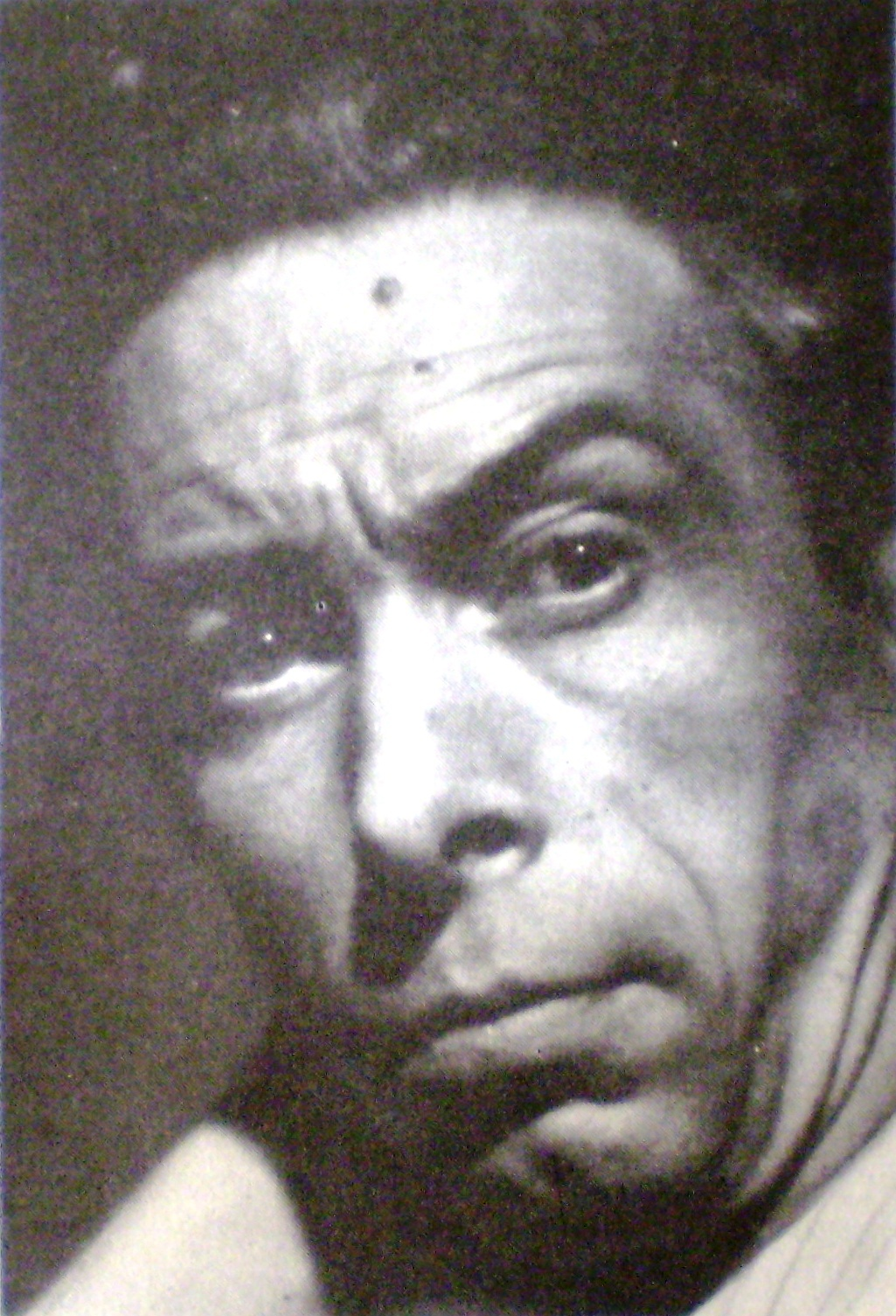
- Born: 1 March 1898; Santiago del Estero, Argentina
- Died: 9 April 1964 (aged 66); Buenos Aires
- Occupation: Painter

Ramón Gómez Cornet (1 March 1898 - 9 April 1964) was an Argentine painter. He was one of the forerunners of the modern Argentine painting.

== Biography ==
Ramón Gómez Cornet was the son of Ramon Gomez, former Minister of Interior on Hipólito Yrigoyen's government and National Senator for Santiago del Estero province, and Rosario Palacio Achával Cornet. Began his studies at the Normal School in his province to continue them in the Colegio Marista of Lujan later passing to the School Charles Magne.

Gómez showed his artistic abilities since a young age: in his early twenties he drew portraits of his maternal grandparents, Manuel Cornet Diaz - Deputy for the National Congress in 1882 - and his wife Doña Rosario Palacio Achával, found today in the Historical Museum of Santiago del Estero. He began his studies at the Academy of Fine Arts, Córdoba, and then traveled by the main art centers of Europe, where he lived for several years, and Africa, gathering experiences that, while tuned his plastic art, enriching his human knowledge.

He was mainly influenced by artists like Cézanne and Renoir. He perfected his art in the Libre Arts workshop of Barcelona, where in 1917 he made his first exhibits with favorable reviews, and the Ranson Academy of Paris. After studying at the City of Lights and Barcelona, deeply know the works and techniques of early Renaissance masters and contact and the avant-garde, in 1921 Gómez returned to Argentina and exposed in the defunct Galería Chandler of Buenos Aires the first pictures with Cubist and Fauvist influences known in Argentina, having a pioneering role on the new trends that other artists would follow a few years later.

Ramón Gómez Cornet also served as a diplomat and professor teaching at universities including the National University of Tucumán convened by Lino Enea Spilimbergo, and in his private atelier. During his stay in Mendoza he was a professor at the Academía de Bellas Artes, from which emerged internationally renowned artists such as Carlos Alonso and Enrique Sobisch.

During his life he made around 1500 works, including oils, watercolors, pastels, drawings and prints. 50 of them are in national, provincial and foreign museums. Ramón Gómez Cornet married Argentina Rotondo, with whom he had two daughters, Rosario and Adelina. He died in Buenos Aires on April 9, 1964, at 66 years of age.
