= Timoteo Navarro Museum of Art =

Art museum in Tucumán Argentina

Coordinates: 26°49′54″S 65°12′17″W

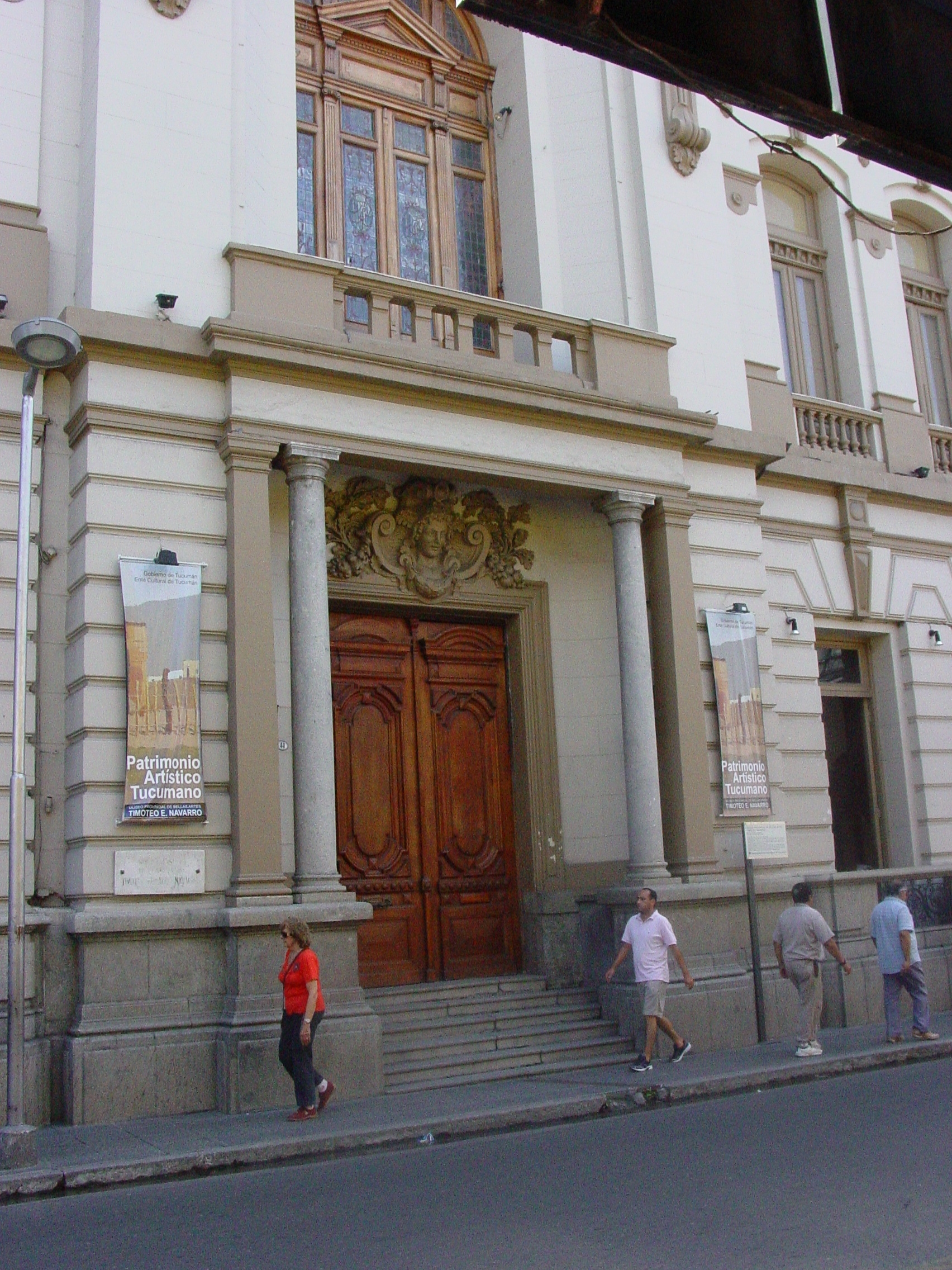
The Timoteo Navarro Museum of Art

The Timoteo Navarro Provincial Museum of Fine Arts is the leading museum of its kind in Tucumán Province, Argentina.

== Overview ==
The museum was first proposed by a prominent local lawyer and educator, Juan Bautista Terán, who in 1912 established the National University of Tucumán. The museum was conceived to complement the new university's School of Fine Arts, and on June 18, 1916, the institution was inaugurated as the first in the city of San Miguel de Tucumán.

The museum became an autonomous entity in 1922, and in 1931, it was transferred to larger facilities. It was again transferred in 1957 to the historic home of former President Nicolás Avellaneda, though the building's deteriorating state led to the museum's closure in 1997, and its collections were temporarily moved to the provincial Secretariat of Culture. The closure of a landmark branch of the Bank of the Province of Tucumán and its designation as a National Historic Monument allowed the Secretariat of Culture to relocate the growing collections to its present site, reinaugurating the museum on September 29, 2003.

Renamed in honor of the famed local sculptor Lola Mora in 1975, the museum was again renamed in 1986 in honor of local painter and art instructor Timoteo Navarro.

The museum is housed in an eclectic, baroque and French neoclassical building designed in 1905 by Belgian-Argentine architect Alberto Pelsmaekers (1855 – 1923). The main hall, where the majority of the museum's exhibits are displayed, is a 400 m^{2} (4,200 ft²) space topped by a two-story ceiling and a skylight, a 144 m^{2} (1,500 ft²) glass and iron structure sustained by wrought-iron pillars.

Its permanent collections, the most important in the Argentine Northwest, include over 680 works, including paintings, sketches, lithographs, ceramics, sculptures, illustrated poems and photographs. Among the Argentine artists represented are: Pompeyo Audivert, Antonio Berni, Pío Collivadino, Ezequiel Linares, Luis Lobo de la Vega, Timoteo Navarro, Antonio Pujía, Benito Quinquela Martín, Cesáreo Bernaldo de Quirós, and Lino Enea Spilimbergo.
