= Aquiles Badi =

Argentine painter

- Born: April 14, 1894; Buenos Aires
- Died: May 8, 1976 (aged 82); Buenos Aires
- Occupation: Painter

Aquiles Badi (1894–1976) was twentieth-century Argentine painter. He was born in Buenos Aires on April 14, 1894, and died in that same city on May 8, 1976.

== Education ==
Badi studied in Italy and Argentina. He spent his childhood in Milan (Italy) and studied at the Regio Collegio Tomasseo school where he earned a Technical License in 1909. That same year, at age 15, he returned to Buenos Aires to study at the National Academy of Fine Arts. Here he became a close friend of the painters Horace Butler and Héctor Basaldúa.

== Career ==
After the death of his father, Badi returned to Italy in 1921, where he toured Europe with his friend Butler. He continued his studies in Paris at the Julian Academy and Le Fauconier Workshop. Over the next years of his radical life he lived in the towns of Sanary-Sur-Mer and Cagnes, France, where he met up with Raquel Forner, Alfredo Bigatti, Pedro Dominguez Neira, Alberto Moravia and Leopoldo Marechal.

In 1928, Badi traveled to Buenos Aires with his friends to the First Exhibition of Modern Painting which took place in Buenos Aires, in the studios of the Association of Friends of Art. That year he was also involved in the Salon des Indépendants in Paris. In the 1930s Badi took up residence in Milan and Paris where he was an active participant in the "Paris Group", along with Hector Basaldua, Antonio Berni, Horace Butler, Lino E. Spilimbergo and Juan Del Prete. During the course of World War II he lived in Milan and worked closely on illustrations of books and magazines like The Lettura, the monthly magazine Nuevo Corriere della Sera and with Martedì, a literary conference by the Bonpiani Publishing House.

In 1936, he settled permanently in Buenos Aires and opened the Atelier Libre of Contemporary Art on Corrientes Street in 1309, along with Horacio Butler. Within days his work La plaza was lauded by Gilles de la Tourette in the newspaper La Nación. Also that year he won the Watercolourist sectional prize awarded by the National Commission on Fine Arts. He achieved another distinction in the Second National Exhibition of decorative artists and the First Prize for Mural Painting from the National Commission on Culture. The Castello Sforzesco Museum in Milan acquired one of his works for their collection.

In 1937 he began to head the newly formed Argentina Society of Plastic Artists (SAAP). With his work 'El hombre verde' he got the Martin Rodriguez Galisteo Acquisition Prize at the XIII Annual Santa Fe Exhibition. He also travelled to Paris to the Paris International Exhibition making decorative panels with Lino Enea Spilimbergo. In this important exhibition he was distinguished, along with other artists from Argentina, with a gold medal.

== Works ==
- Descendimiento (Descent), 1937, Oil, 1.55 x 1.20m, Municipal Museum of Plastic Art, Eduardo Sívori.
- Cristo de los Escombros (Christ in the Rubble), 1949, Oil, 0.74 x 0.60m, Private Collection.
- Composición italiana (Italian composition), Oil, 0.80 x 1.02m, Private Collection.
- Naturaleza muerta con antifaz (Still life with mask), 1929, Oil, 1 x 0.81 m, National Museum of Fine Arts, Buenos Aires.
