= Juan Carlos Castagnino =

Argentine artist and architect (1908–1972)

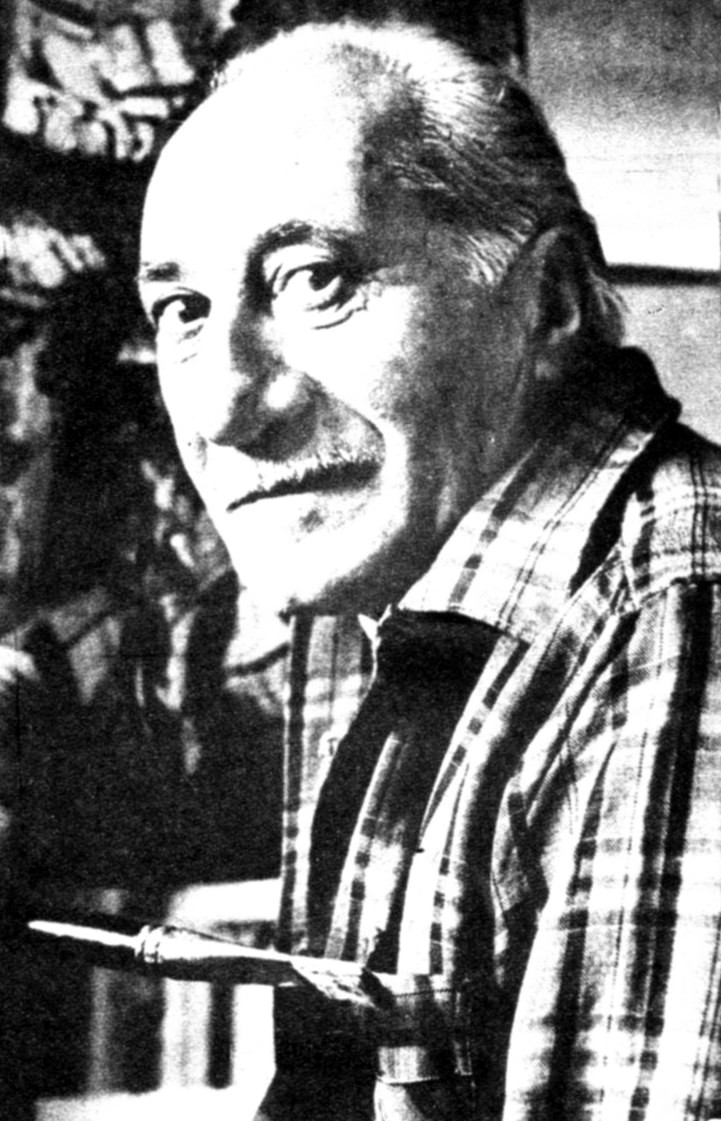
- Juan Carlos Castagnino
- Born: November 18, 1908; Mar del Plata, Argentina
- Died: April 21, 1972 (Aged 63); Buenos Aires, Argentina
- Known for: Painter, architect, muralist and sketch artist
- Awards: Grand Prize of Honor, Argentine National Hall (1961); Medal of Honor at Expo '58 (Brussels); Special mention, II Mexico City Biennale (1962)

Juan Carlos Castagnino (November 18, 1908 – April 21, 1972) was an Argentine painter, architect, muralist and sketch artist.

Born in the rural village of Camet, near the city of Mar del Plata, he studied in the Escuela de Bellas Artes in Buenos Aires, and became a disciple of Lino Enea Spilimbergo and Ramón Gómez Cornet.

By the end of the 1920s, he became a member of the Communist Party of Argentina. In 1933 he joined the first Argentine artists' guild, and later that year he exhibited at the National Fine Arts Hall in Buenos Aires. His work, predominantly realist in his earlier years, became more figurative, later on, and though his Communist affiliation was reflected in numerous works with social undertones, he painted a wide variety of subject matter.

Along with Antonio Berni, Spilimbergo and Mexican muralist David Alfaro Siqueiros, he created a series of murals for a villa belonging to local businessman Natalio Botana, in Don Torcuato. Castagnino traveled to Paris in 1939, where he attended the atelier of cubist painter André Lhote, later traveling across Europe perfecting his art and in the company of Georges Braque, Fernand Léger and Pablo Picasso, among others. Castagnino returned to Argentina in 1941, where he enrolled at the University of Buenos Aires and obtained a degree in architecture. He received numerous awards in subsequent years, including the Grand Prize of Honor of the Argentine National Hall (1961), the Medal of Honor at Expo '58 (Brussels, 1958), and a special mention for his drawings at the II Mexico City Biennale of 1962. His illustrations for a EUDEBA (University of Buenos Aires Press) edition of José Hernández's Martín Fierro (the national poem of Argentina), gained wide recognition.

Castagnino died in Buenos Aires in 1972. Following its relocation to the landmark Villa Ortiz Basualdo, the Municipal Museum of Art in his native Mar del Plata, to which the artist had contributed over 130 works, was renamed in his honor in 1982.
