= Víctor Rebuffo =

Italian-born Argentine artist (1903–1983)

- Born: February 14, 1903; Turin, Italy
- Died: September 2, 1983 (aged 80); Buenos Aires, Argentina
- Education: Instituto Universitario Nacional del Arte
- Known for: Engraving; Graphic novels; Illustration; Printmaking
- Notable work: Contraluz (1952–53)

Víctor Luciano Rebuffo (14 February 1903, Turin, Piedmont, Italy – 2 September 1983, Buenos Aires, Argentina) was an Italian-born printmaker, illustrator, and graphic novelist who lived and worked in Argentina.

== Education and career ==
Rebuffo's family settled in Argentina soon after he was born. At the age of 17 he entered the National Academy of Fine Arts, where he graduated in 1926 as an art teacher. He began his career as an engraver and woodcutter a year later.

His style was both bold and socially conscious, strongly influenced by the social realism of the Artistas del Pueblo (People's Artists) art collective.

Art critic Julio E. Payró says that Rebuffo "stands out for the absolute clarity of his language, for its force of direct suggestion and, above all, for the beautiful conciseness of his images".

Rebuffo's woodcut style has been compared to that of Frans Masereel, Käthe Kollwitz, Max Beckmann and Otto Dix. Critic Silvia Dolinko has noted "significant iconographic, stylistic and narrative similarities" with Belgian woodcut artist and precursor of the graphic novel Frans Masereel.

Rebuffo himself acknowledged Guaman Poma, José Guadalupe Posada and his contemporaries Pompeyo Audivert and Frans Masereel as his primary influences: "The graphic story, projected as on a cinematographic screen with sequences of images that transmit the alternatives and incidents of a plot, has allowed, on all occasions that it has been used, to expand the social-historical knowledge of a people, its most ingrained customs and the events of the environment in which it is developed. Socially, it served a role of linking and disseminating ideas of popular content that claimed the most urgent rights of the masses. Such examples are, among others, revealed to us in the Guaman Poma, a graphic chronicle of the Inca Peru of the conquest, the Calaveras y corridos of José Guadalupe Posada, a marked influence on the peasant revolution of Mexico, and the series of woodcut novels of Frans Masereel, which express with sharp features and cutting criteria the strange aspects of daily life."

In 1943, he was appointed Artistic Director of the Peuser publishing house, where he made illustrations for several books, among them Los Gauchos Judíos (The Jew Gauchos) by Alberto Gerchunoff, Reinaldo Solar by Rómulo Gallegos and Los Santos Evangelios (The Holy Gospels).

From 1948 to 1970, he taught engraving as professor extraordinaire at the University of Tucumán. He held exhibitions in Argentina and abroad, including Brazil (São Paulo Biennial), Mexico, Spain, Belgium (Brussels) and Tokyo.

== Major works ==
Rebuffo's greatest work is the wordless novel Contraluz published in 1979. It is composed of 130 woodcuts which were completed between 1952 and 1953.

He also published in magazines: Contra La revista de los franco-tiradores and Nervio.
