= Eduardo Sívori Museum =

Municipal art museum in Buenos Aires, Argentina

Coordinates: 34°34′9″S 58°25′5″W

Eduardo Sívori Museum of Plastic Arts
- Museo de Artes Plásticas; Eduardo Sívori
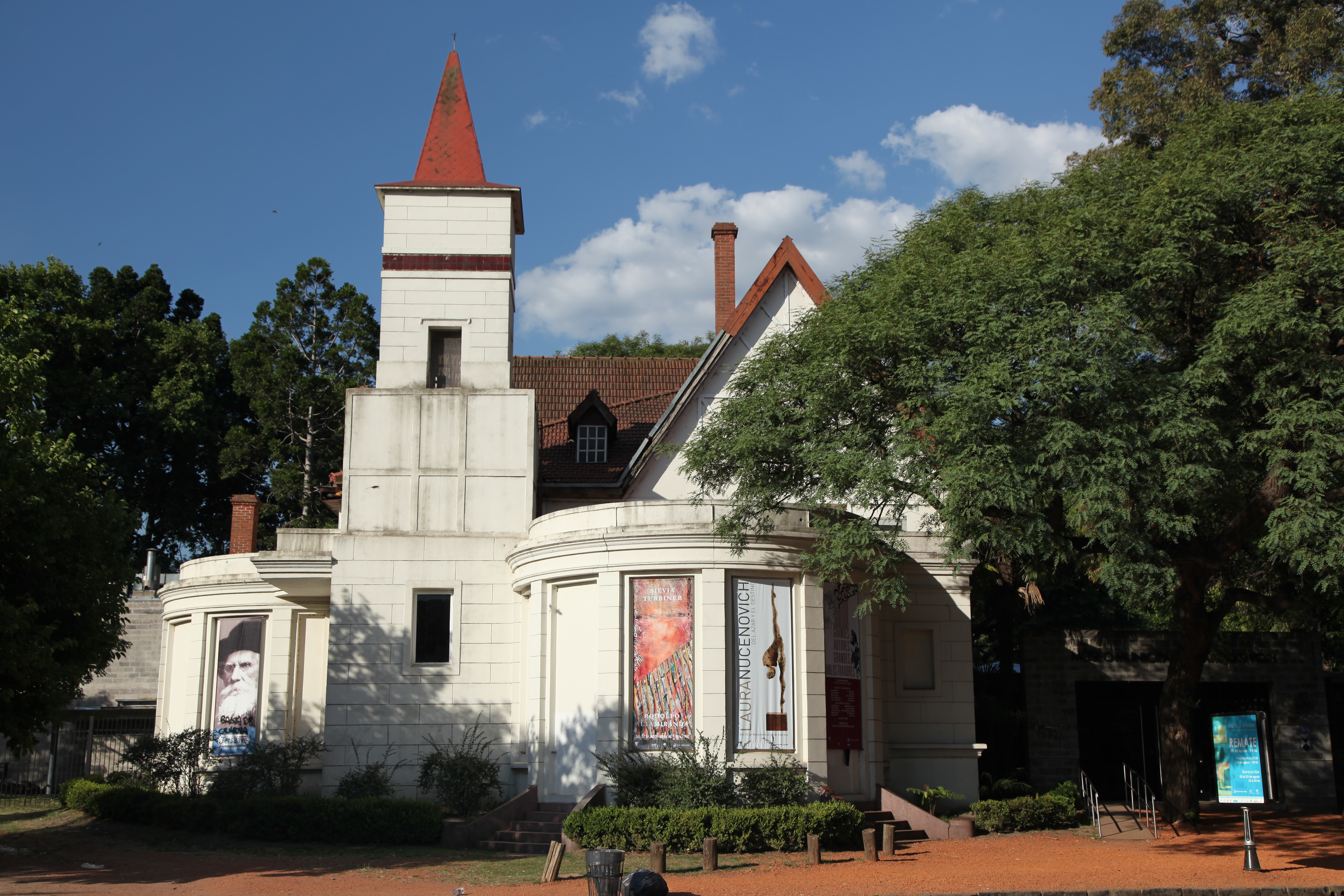
- Main building of the museum
- Established: 1938; 88 years ago
- Location: Infanta Isabel 555; Buenos Aires, Argentina
- Type: Art museum
- Collection size: 4,000 objects
- Visitors: 46,000/year
- Director: Lic. Teresa Riccardi
- Website: buenosaires.gob.ar/museosivori

The Eduardo Sívori Museum of Plastic Arts (Spanish: Museo de Artes Plásticas Eduardo Sívori) is a municipal art museum in Buenos Aires, Argentina. It was named after painter Eduardo Sívori and was inaugurated in 1938.

Since 1995, the museum is located in a building that had previously operated as coffeehouse (and originally a dairy farm) at Parque Tres de Febrero in the Palermo neighborhood. Its collection of objects is estimated in 4,000 pieces of art.

== Overview ==
Founded on the initiative of city councilman Fernando Ghio, who proposed the creation of a municipal museum devoted to Argentine artists (as a more specialized counterpart of the National Museum of Fine Arts) in 1933, the institution was inaugurated in 1938 as the "Municipal Museum of Fine Arts, Applied Art, and Comparative Art." The museum became the venue for the annual municipal art salon, first held in 1936.

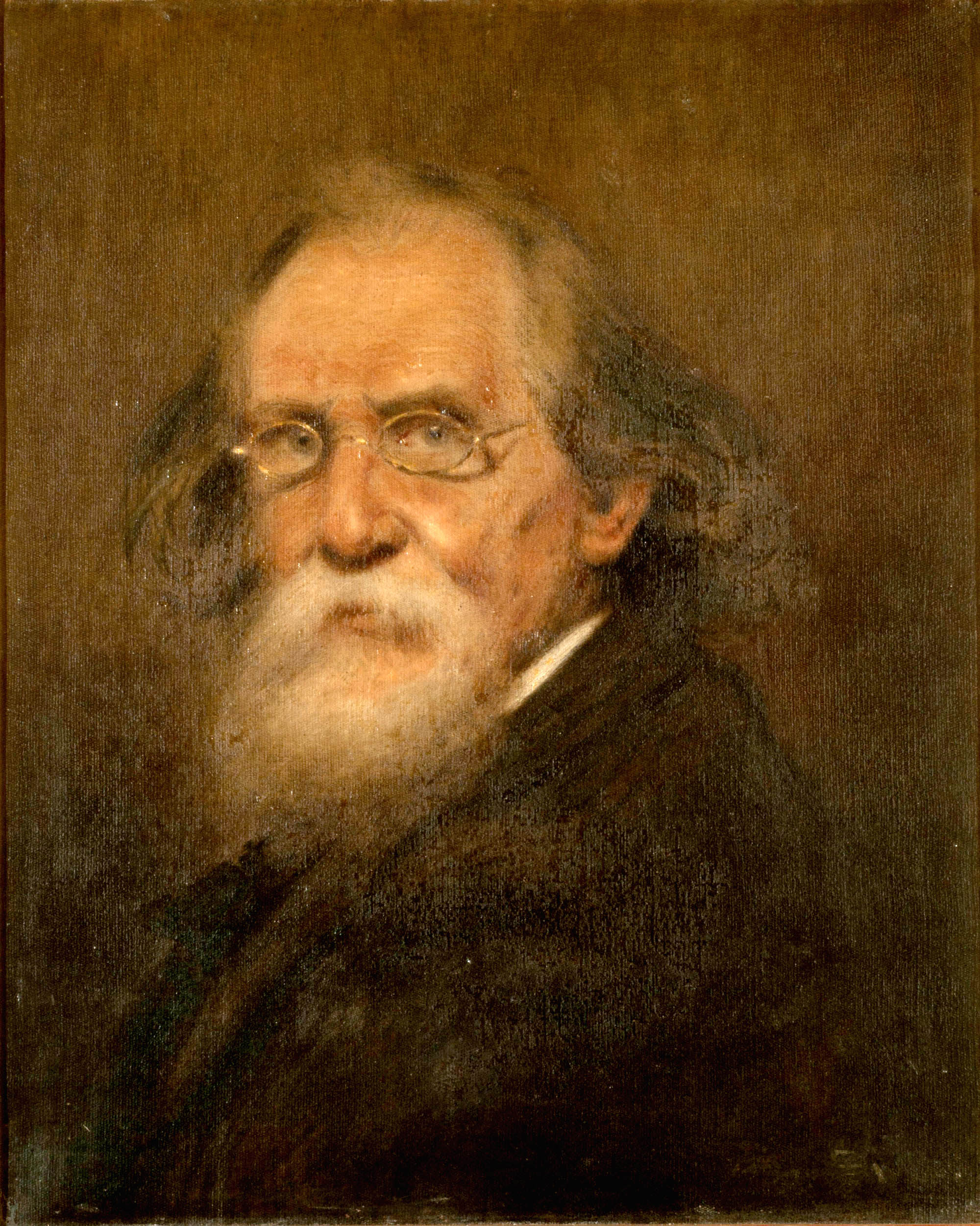
The museum was named after painter Eduardo Sívori (here displayed on a digitally retouched self portrait)

The museum was originally housed in the Buenos Aires City Legislature (City Council Building).Its second director, Carlos Abregú Virreira, drew from his rustic, Santiago del Estero Province background to augment the museum's collection with works from the Argentine Northwest during his 1943–1951 tenure. The museum was renamed in 1946 for the "portraiteur of the pampas", the late Realist painter Eduardo Sívori; Sívori had founded the first artisan guild in Argentina, the Society for the Promotion of Fine Arts, where he served as president.

The installation of the Eva Perón Foundation in the City Council Building led to the museum's 1952 relocation to an Avenida del Libertador house which had belonged to a patron of traditional Argentine art, Félix Bunge (1894–1935). Its relocation involved the transfer of some 130 works, however, to other institutions and over the objection to the Sívori Museum authorities.

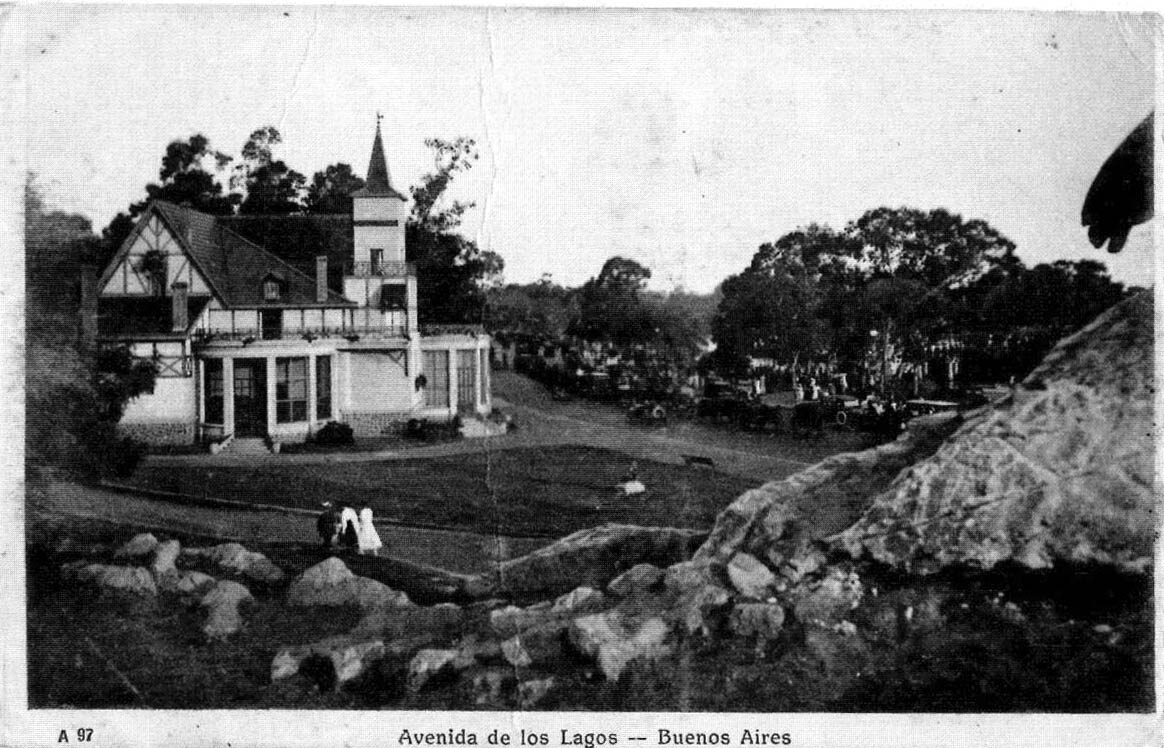
Before being seat of the museum, the house (here portrayed c. 1920s) served as a dairy farm and then a coffeehouse

The event, moreover, began an era of impermanence and uncertainty for the museum. The establishment of one of these recipients of this transfer, the José Hernandez Museum, in 1955, and the Bunge house's designation as its site led to the Sívori's move to a Retiro neighborhood mansion. The ongoing, northward expansion of Ninth of July Avenue forced yet another relocation, to the new San Martín Cultural Center, in 1961. It was merged with the Buenos Aires Museum of Modern Art between 1975 and 1977 as the Municipal Museum of Visual Arts, and did not regain its administrative autonomy until 1982; its collections continued to grow through acquisitions, as well as private donations and bequeathals.

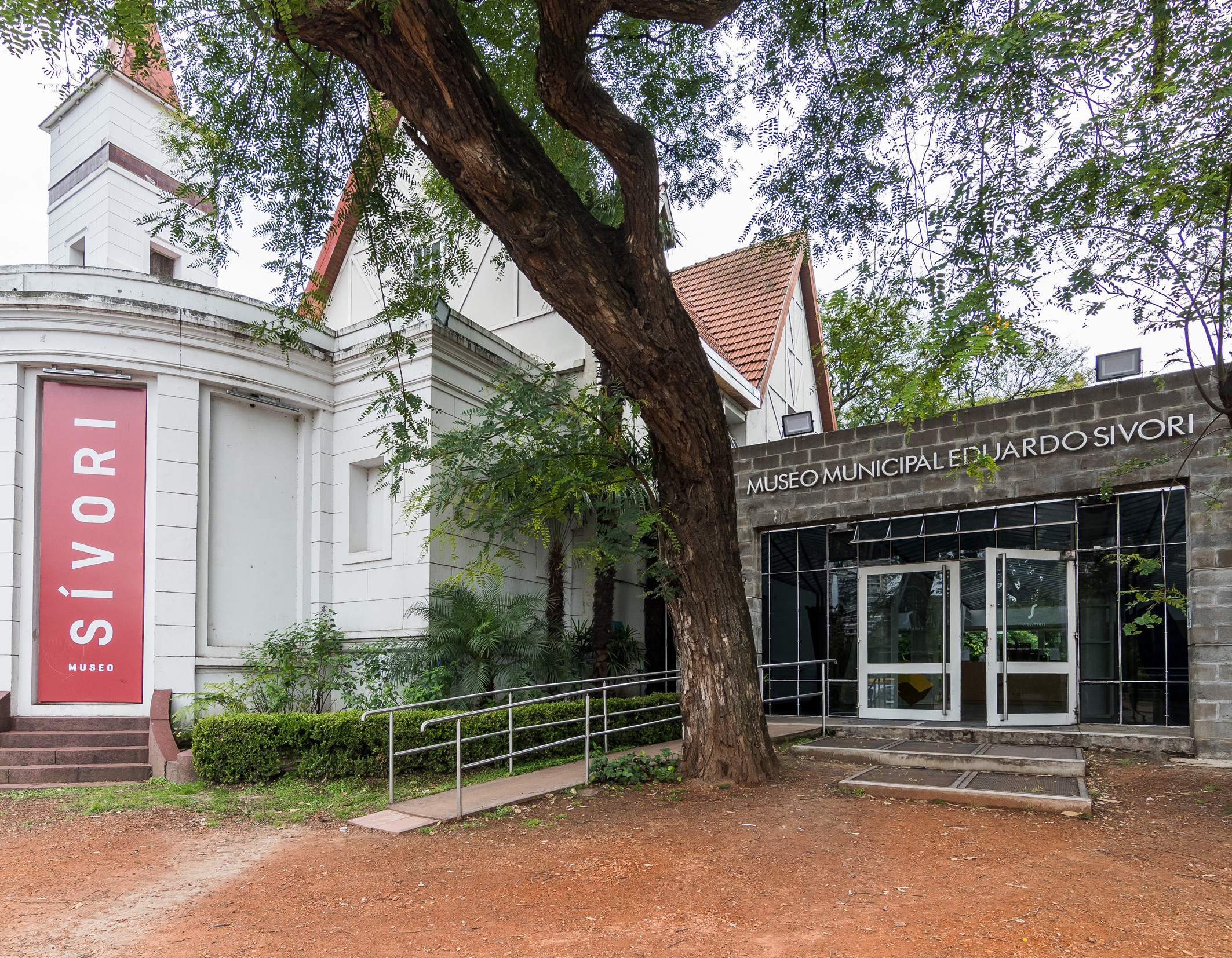
New annex (right) behind the original building, portrayed in 2018

A 1995 initiative by Mayor Jorge Domínguez resulted in a permanent home for the museum, the former Hostal del Ciervo Café (name taken from a neighbor sculpture named "family of deers" by French artist Georges Gardet) facing the Parque Tres de Febrero rose garden. The Norman-styled building, built in 1912, was refurbished with a modern annex housing two wings, and inaugurated on August 4, 1996. The 4,000 m^{2} (43,000 ft²) museum, directed since its reinaugural by María Isabel de Larrañaga (the daughter of an Argentine painter, Enrique de Larrañaga (1900–1956)), maintains over 4,000 works; among the Argentine artists represented are Líbero Badii, Cesáreo Bernaldo de Quirós, Antonio Berni, Pío Collivadino, Lucio Correa Morales, Pedro Figari (Uruguay), Antonio Pujía, Guillermo Roux, Lino Enea Spilimbergo, Rogelio Yrurtia, and its namesake, Eduardo Sívori. The permanent exhibit halls are complemented by one for temporary displays, an art library, restoration workshop, and the Ivelyse Gordon de Grimaldi Sculpture Garden.

The museum's finances suffered during the 1998–2002 Argentine great depression, and numerous works were put at auction from 2000 to 2004 by the Friends of the Sívori Museum Association; one work, by Expressionist painter Rómulo Macció, was auctioned at a reported one-twentieth of its market value. Expanding its schedule of educational events with the subsequent improvement in its finances, the museum continues to host the annual Manuel Belgrano salon.
