= Leopoldo Presas =

Argentine artist (1915–2009)

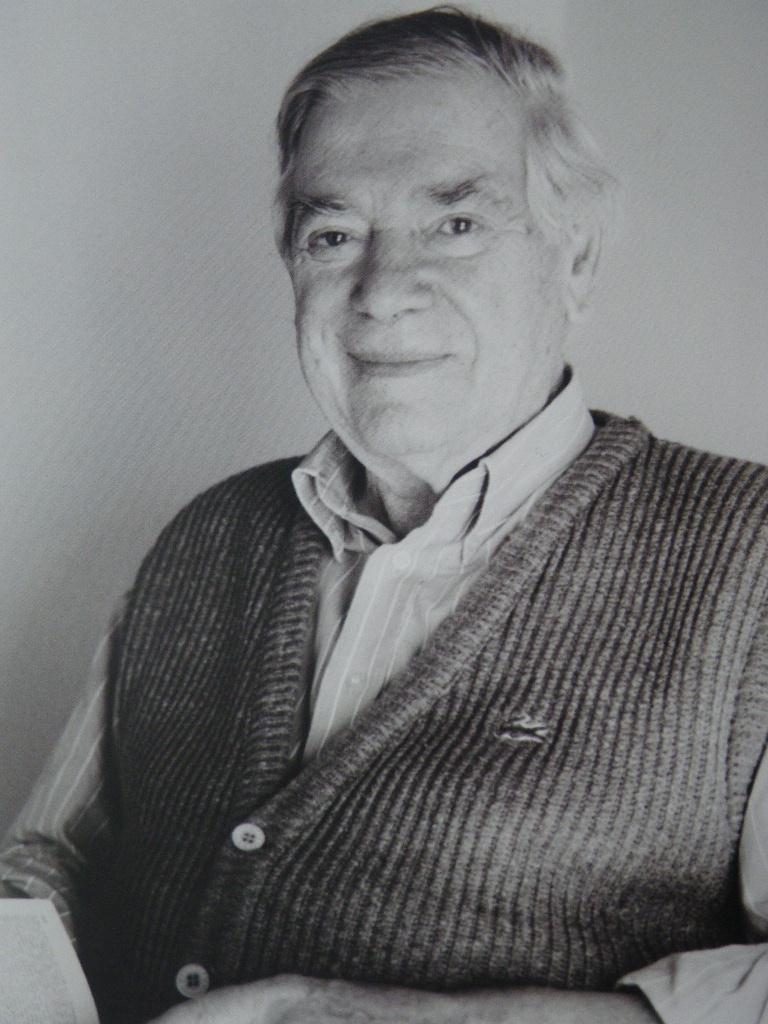
- Leopoldo Presas
- Born: Leopoldo Pedro Presas; February 21, 1915; Buenos Aires, Argentina
- Died: June 12, 2009 (94); Buenos Aires, Argentina
- Known for: Painting, Drawing
- Movement: Figurative art, Expressionism

Leopoldo Presas (1915-2009) was an Argentine artist. He experienced different styles throughout his life. He had academic training and started as a figurative painter though he later turned into expressionism as well. He tried several mediums as oil, tempera, charcoal and pencil on different supports including canvas, paper, paperboard and newspaper. The themes of his works have been very extensive. The female figure was his main attraction, but he also did still lifes, landscapes, harbors, erotic paintings and some expressionist and controversial series as “The Pigs”, “The Kings of Putrefaction” and “The Christs”. He won the Konex Award in 1982 and 2012.

== Museums ==
- Museo Nacional de Bellas Artes (Buenos Aires, Argentina)
- Museo de Arte Moderno de Buenos Aires[in Spanish] (Buenos Aires, Argentina)
- Museo de Artes Plásticas Eduardo Sívori (Buenos Aires, Argentina)
- Museo Colección de Arte Amalia Lacroce de Fortabat, (Buenos Aires, Argentina)
- Museo de Arte de Tigre (Buenos Aires Province, Argentina)
- Museo Genaro Pérez, Córdoba
- Museo de Bellas Artes de Tres Arroyos (Buenos Aires Province, Argentina)
- Museo de Bellas Artes de La Rioja (La Rioja Province, Argentina)
- Museo Provincial de Bellas Artes Timoteo Navarro (Tucumán Province, Argentina)
- Museo de Bellas Artes de Lugo (Spain)
- Museo de Bellas Artes de Lima (Peru)
- Museu de Arte Moderna de São Paulo (Brazil)

== Bibliography ==
- “Presas, Estudio Crítico”, (Presas: Critical Study) by Rafael Squirru, Ediciones El Mangrullo SA, Buenos Aires, 1967
- “Leopoldo Presas: El Amor En Todas Sus Formas”, (Leopoldo Presas: Love in all Shapes) by Enrique Horacio Gené, Editorial Club de Estudio, Buenos Aires, 1993
- “Leopoldo Presas: Obras de Colección”, (Leopoldo Presas: Collection Works) by Raúl Santana and Nicolás Rubió, Editorial Argentina, Sociedad Editora e Impresora Del Río De La Plata, 2005
