= Carlos Alonso =

Argentine painter, draftsman and printmaker (1929–2026)

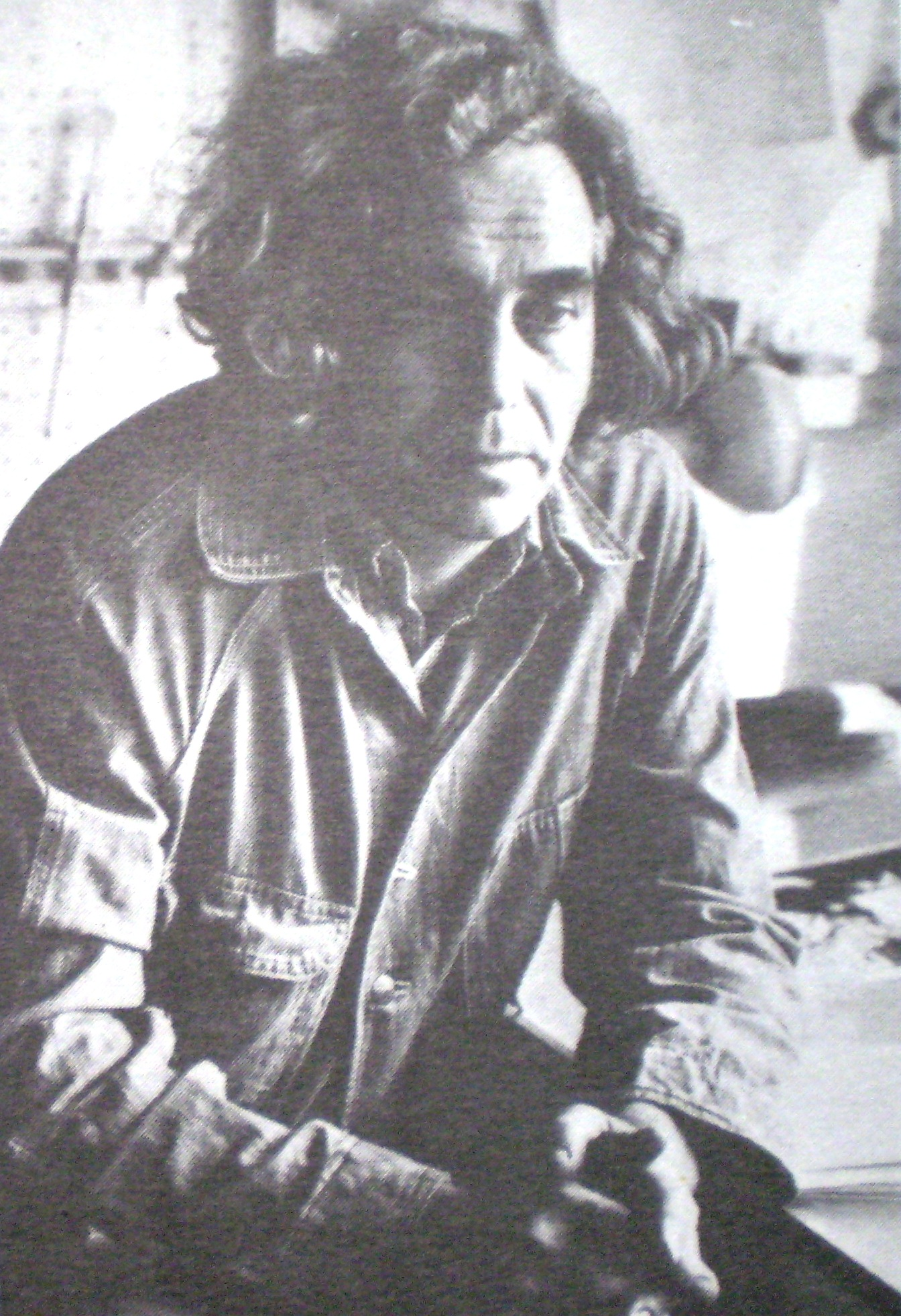
- Carlos Alonso (1979)
- Born: 4 February 1929; Tunuyán, Mendoza Province, Argentina
- Died: 21 September 2026 (aged 97); Córdoba, Argentina
- Education: Academia Nacional de Bellas Artes
- Known for: Painter, draftsman and printmaker
- Movement: Social realist; New realist
- Awards: 1957, First Prize, Emecé Contest

Carlos Alonso (4 February 1929 – 21 September 2026) was an Argentine contemporary painter, draftsman and printmaker. Though he was a Social realist in his early career, he is best known as a New realist. Beef is a common element in his work.

== Early years ==
Alonso was born in Tunuyán and lived there until he was seven. His family then moved to Mendoza. At 14, he joined the Academia Nacional de Bellas Artes, studying drawing and engraving with Sergio Sergi, sculpture with Lorenzo Dominguez, and painting with Francisco Bernareggi and Ramón Gomez Cornet. Later, at the National University of Cuyo, he trained under Lino Enea Spilimbergo.

== Career ==
Alonso received his first award in 1947. In 1951, he won first prize at the Salon of Painting in San Rafael, the North Hall in Santiago del Estero, and drawing at the Salon del Norte Tucumán. In 1953, Alonso exhibited at the Gallery Viau of Buenos Aires, then traveled to Europe where he exhibited in Paris and Madrid. In 1957, he won the competition held by Emecé Editores to illustrate the part 2 of the Miguel de Cervantes novel Don Quixote, and the José Hernández poem Martín Fierro in 1959. In 1961, he won the Premio Chantal del Salón de Acuarelistas y Grabadores of Buenos Aires. In the same year, while visiting London, he discovered acrylic painting techniques. His Don Quixote pictures were published on postcards in the Soviet Union in 1963.

His art, known for its expressive power and social themes, has been widely exhibited. In 1967, the Art Gallery International in Buenos Aires displayed 250 of his works based on Dante’s Divine Comedy. His art has also been shown at the Palacio de Bellas Artes in Mexico City and the Museo Nacional de Bellas Artes de La Habana in Cuba. In 1971, his works were exhibited in European galleries such as Villa Giulia in Rome, the Eidos of Milan, and the Bedford in London. In 2005, to mark the 400th anniversary of Don Quixote part 1 being published, the Museum of Design and Illustration held a tribute exhibition at Buenos Aires' Museo de Artes Plásticas Eduardo Sívori where Alonso's prints and original drawings were displayed. His illustrations have been included in the novel Mad Toy by Roberto Arlt.

He was granted the Platinum Konex Award in 1982 and 1992 for his work in the decade, and the Konex Special Mention for his whole trajectory in 2012.

== Personal life and death ==
Alonso married the artist Ivonne Fauvety. Following the coup of 1976, and the disappearance of his daughter Paloma (born 25 July 1956) the following year, Alonso went into exile in Italy, and in 1979, he moved to Madrid. He returned to Argentina two years later. The Bienal de Pintura Paloma Alonso. named in her honor, is a 1990 joint initiative of Alonso and Teresa Nachman.

Alonso died on 21 September 2026, at the age of 97. He was the uncle of the chess grandmaster Salvador Alonso.

== Partial works ==
- Alonso, C. (2007). Carlos Alonso, ilustrador. Buenos Aires: Fundación Alon.
