= Ricardo Carpani =

Argentine artist

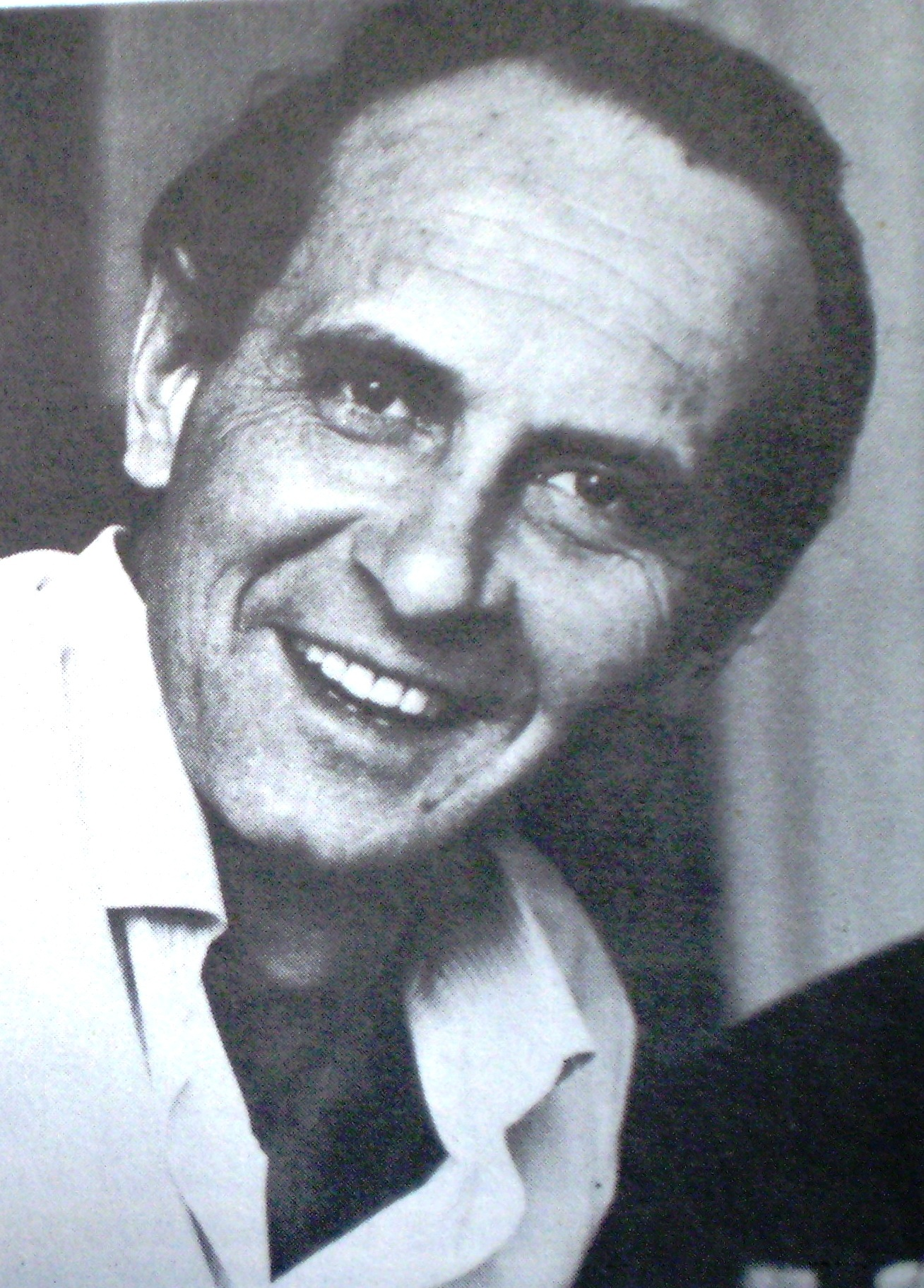
Ricardo Carpani

Ricardo Carpani (February 2, 1930 – September 9, 1997) was an Argentine artist.

== Life and work ==
Born in Tigre, a northern suburb of Buenos Aires, his family moved to the city proper in 1936, and there Carpani finished his secondary school studies. He then started to study law, but soon abandoned it, and at the age of 20 he travelled to Paris, France, where he became first a model for artists and then an artist himself.

He returned to Buenos Aires in 1952 and studied a year with master Emilio Pettorutti. His first art exhibition took place in 1957. Together with other artists, he founded the Espartaco movement. Carpani was sympathetic with social causes, and his paintings are focused on topics like the unemployed, the working people and the poor, as well as nationalistic themes. They are strong, solid and clear-cut, often portraiting determined men; this line of work is reflected in his illustrations of Argentina's national epic gauchesque poem, Martín Fierro.

In the 1970s Carpani, like many other Argentine artists, writers and intellectuals during the Proceso de Reorganización Nacional, exiled himself and settled in Madrid, Spain, and then toured Europe, the United States, Cuba, Mexico and Ecuador. Along with others in the Argentine Commission in Defense of Human Rights, he denounced the crimes of the dictatorship for the outside world to know.

A year after the restoration of democracy in Argentina, in 1984, Carpani returned to his home country, and he produced a series of portraits (such as those of Julio Cortázar and Roberto Arlt). He also started a series of works focused on classic Buenos Aires urban topics (such as tango, cafés and the barrios), with tropical backgrounds.

Not long before his death, Carpani drew a large portrait of Che Guevara which is now shown at the Plaza de la Cooperación in Rosario, a few blocks away from Guevara's birthplace.

Carpani died in Buenos Aires in 1997.
