= Eduardo Schiaffino =

Argentine painter, critic, intellectual and historian

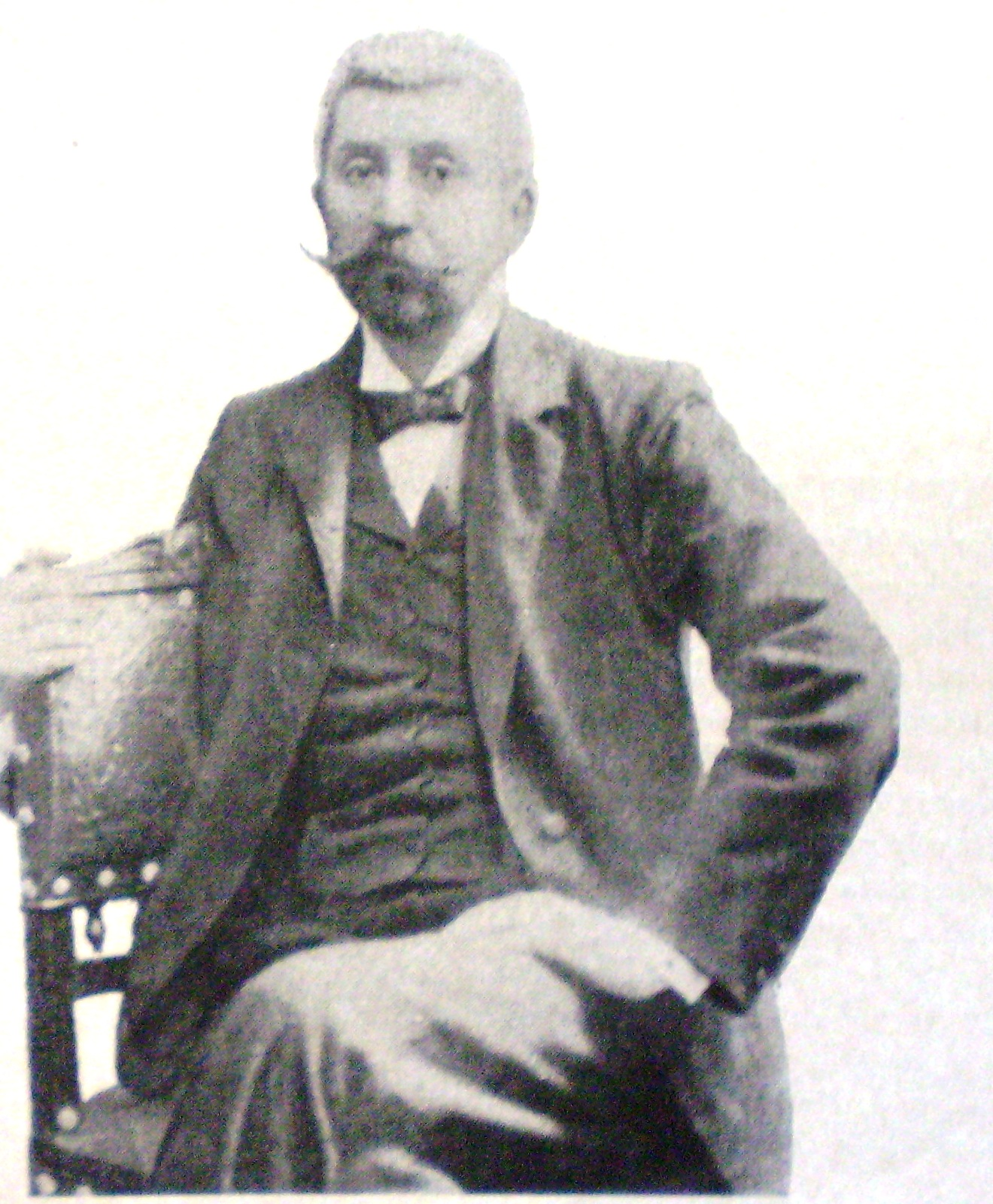
- Eduardo Schiaffino
- Born: 1858; Buenos Aires, Argentina
- Died: 1935 (aged 76–77); Buenos Aires, Argentina
- Occupations: Painter, Art Critic, Art Historian
- Known for: Founder of the National Museum of Fine Arts, Buenos Aires
- Notable work: El Reposo* (1889)

Eduardo Schiaffino (1858–1935) was an Argentine painter, critic, intellectual and historian. A member of a group known as the Generation of '80, he founded the National Museum of Fine Arts in Buenos Aires and sparked the development of painting in his country.

== Biography ==
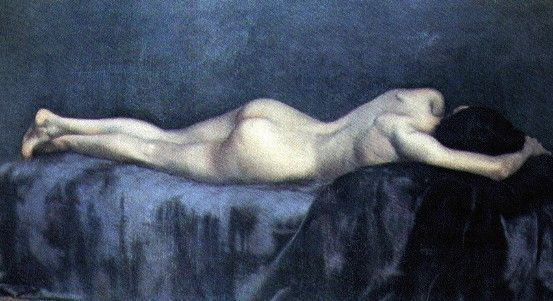
El Reposo (The Repose, 1889), exhibited at the National Museum of Fine Arts.

Schiaffino was born in Buenos Aires in 1858. Trained initially by Venetian painter Giuseppe Agujari, at 18 he was among the founders of the Society for the Stimulus of Fine Arts, the initial name of the National Academy of Fine Arts. In 1884 he travelled to Europe as correspondent for the newspaper El Diario, publishing various articles on artistic themes under the pseudonym Zig Zag.

In 1891 he was one of the founders of the Buenos Aires Athenaeum, a group dedicated to renewing Hispanic American culture through the participation of distinguished figures like Rubén Darío and Leopoldo Lugones. In 1895 he won a victory when the government agreed to create the National Museum of Fine Arts, a project for which he had long struggled. He acted as its first director until 1910, and secured Auguste Rodin's contribution of numerous sculptures for newly established parks in Buenos Aires. The trend in painting he pursued during this period was towards symbolism, which he had publicly and polemically criticised. He acquired a large number of works in thus genre for the Fine Arts Museum during his tenure, just the same.

Schiaffino was afterwards engaged in various diplomatic undertakings in Europe, but in 1933 he returned to Buenos Aires and published his most important book, Painting and Sculpture in Argentina.
