= Eduardo Sívori =

Argentine artist

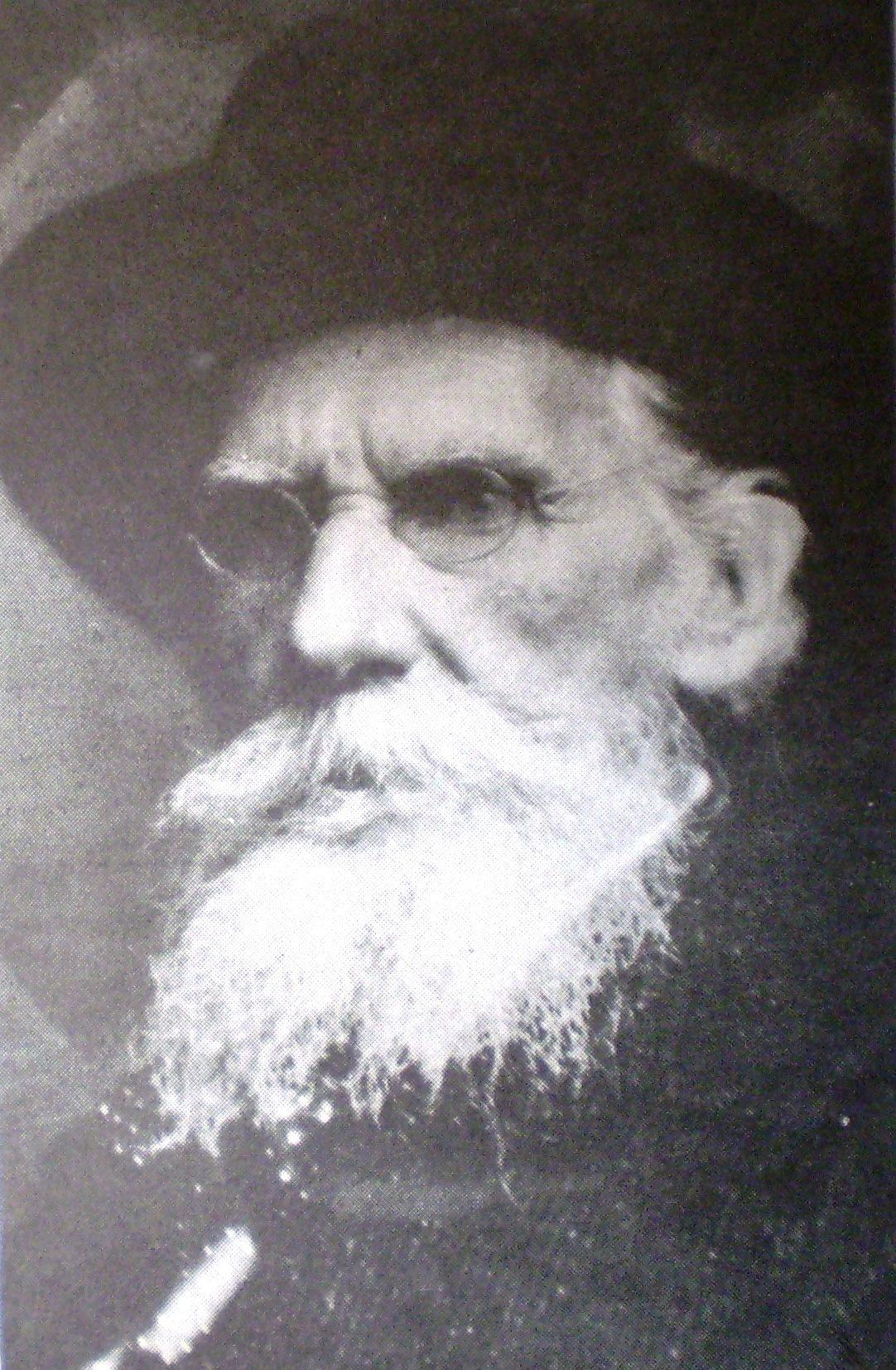
Eduardo Sívori

Eduardo Sívori (October 13, 1847 – June 5, 1918) was an Argentine artist widely regarded as his country's first realist painter.

== Life and work ==
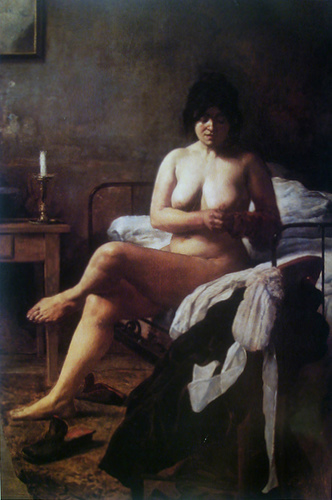
El despertar de la criada ("Waking of the Servant," 1887).

Born to Genoese immigrants in Buenos Aires, Sívori had harbored artistic leanings during childhood that, for family reasons, went unfulfilled. Asked by his father to join him on a business trip to Paris in 1874, Sívori took the opportunity to frequent Parisian ateliers. Returning to Buenos Aires, the experience drew him to other local painters, including his brother, Alejandro, José Aguyari and Eduardo Schiaffino, who would later become one of Argentina's best-known symbolist painters. Together, they founded the Society for the Promotion of Fine Arts in 1875, an important early milestone in the development of artisan guilds in Argentina.

Sívori earned recognition for his Dolce far niente ("Sweet Do Nothing"), for which he was awarded a gold medal at the 1880 Continental Art Salon of Buenos Aires. He returned to Paris in 1882, eventually earning an apprenticeship in the prestigious Jean Paul Laurens atelier, following which he created El despertar de la criada ("Waking of the Servant"), perhaps his best remembered work. Increasingly renowned, his travels took him to the United States, where he was awarded a second gold medal at the St. Louis Exposition of 1884 for Dolce far niente.

Sívori thereafter focused his efforts on commercial art, creating portraits and landscapes for clients, among the best-known of which was local stockbreeder Godofredo Daireaux's in 1903. His bucolic landscapes soon earned him renown as the "portraiteur of the pampas." These relationships helped result in the designation of his guild as an official entity within the National Academy of Fine Arts in 1905, of which he was named president in 1910. Eduardo Sívori died in Buenos Aires in 1918 at the age of seventy, and was honored posthumously with the naming of the new Eduardo Sívori Museum in his honor, in 1938.
