= Reinaldo Giudici =

Italian-born Argentine painter

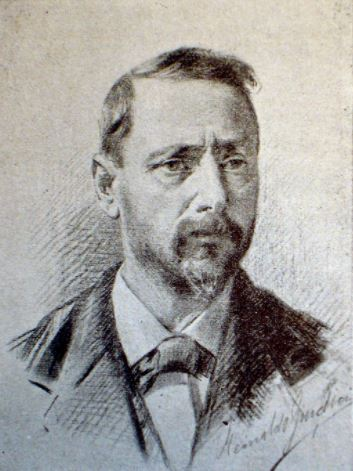
Self-portrait (date unknown)

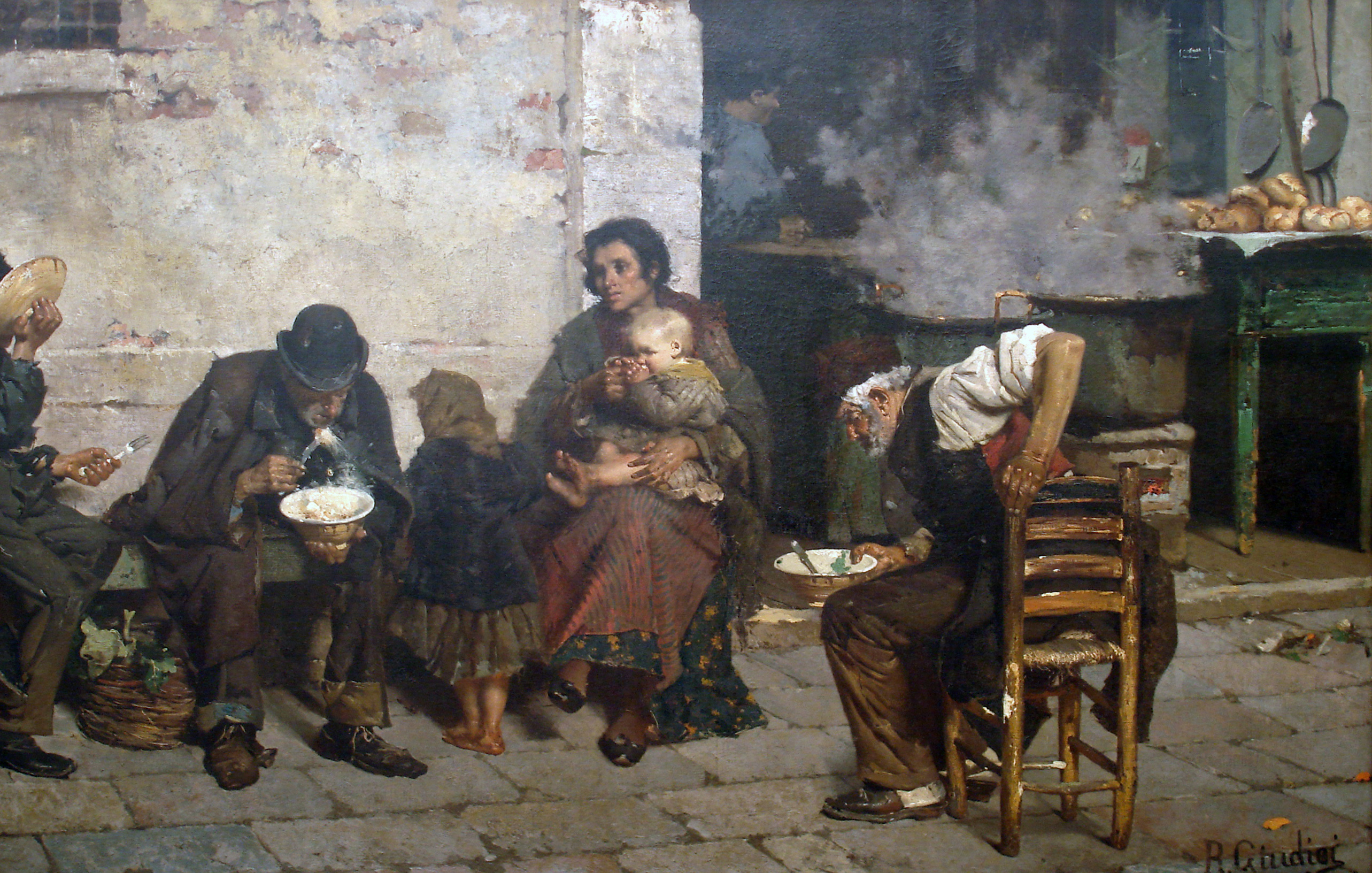
Soup for the Poor, Museo Nacional de Bellas Artes

Reinaldo Giudici (1853, Lenno – 30 August 1921, Buenos Aires) was an Italian-born Argentine painter, best known for his early genre works in the Costumbrismo style.

== Biography ==
He emigrated to Uruguay with his father when he was eight years old, and they settled in Montevideo. There, he studied in the workshop of Juan Manuel Blanes. In 1876, he moved to Buenos Aires, where he was one of the first to attend classes at the newly created "Sociedad Estímulo de Bellas Artes" (SEBA).

In 1878, he received a grant from the Province of Buenos Aires, so he could travel to Italy and complete his studies. He worked with Cesare Maccari, a member of the art movement known as the Macchiaioli, but, despite the grant, was forced to return to Argentina due to financial difficulties.

He returned to Italy in 1880, with a new grant from the Province, and studied in Venice with Giacomo Favretto, who influenced his method of presenting light and colour. It was there he created some of his best known works, including "La Sopa de los Pobres" (Soup for the Poor), which was first shown in Berlin in 1884, during a tour of Germany and Switzerland. Later, it was purchased by Eduardo Wilde, on behalf of the Argentine government, becoming one of the first paintings selected for inclusion in the new Museo Nacional de Bellas Artes.

He was a teacher at SEBA and its successor, the "Academia Nacional de Bellas Artes" (ANBA), for 35 years. In 1904, he received a Gold Medal at the Louisiana Purchase Exposition in St. Louis. In addition to his paintings, he was one of the artists commissioned to decorate the Teatro Colón and the Buenos Aires House of Culture. At first, his paintings were mostly social realism in Costumbrismo style. In his later years, he concentrated on portraits and landscapes.
