= Raquel Forner =

Argentine artist (1902–1988)

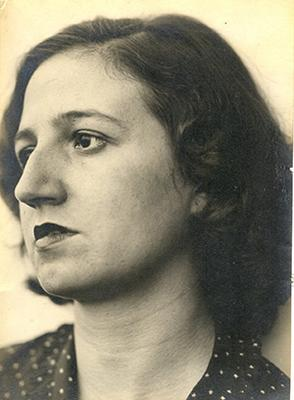
- Forner in 1945
- Born: 22 April 1902; Buenos Aires, Argentina
- Died: 10 June 1988 (aged 86); Buenos Aires, Argentina
- Other names: Raquel Forner Escudero
- Education: National University Art Institute
- Occupation: Painter
- Spouse: Alfredo Bigatti (m. 1936–)

Raquel Forner (1902–1988) was an Argentine painter known for her expressionist works.

== Life ==
Forner was born on 22 April 1902, in Buenos Aires, Argentina. Her father was Spanish by nationality and her mother was an Argentine of Spanish descent. As a result of frequent family travel to Europe, Forner spent part of her childhood in Spain, and later developed an artistic interest in the Spanish Civil War.

Forner completed studies at the National Academy of Fine Arts (today part of the National University Art Institute) in Buenos Aires in 1923. A year before graduation she received an appointment to teach drawing at the same academy. In 1924 she received a third place award from the Argentine National Salon of Fine arts, and in 1928 she had her first solo exhibition in Buenos Aires. Afterward she relocated to Paris and studied with Othon Friesz.

In 1936, she married the Argentine sculptor Alfredo Bigatti.

=== Artistic themes ===
Forner's work demonstrated an interest in current events, and from the beginning of the Spanish Civil War in 1936 this took a dramatic and tragic tone. She borrowed ideas from surrealism during the 1940s, adapting its esthetic of distortion without seeking to reproduce a dream state. In 1942 she took first place at the Argentine National Salon competition. During the 1940s through most of the 1950s she produced several series on similar tragic themes in a primarily expressionist mode. Forner often portrayed strong female figures, but not as specific explorations into gender norms.

Beginning in 1957, coinciding with the space race, Forner's attention turned to imagined scenes of interplanetary travel. With her Space Series, which exhibited in Europe and earned recognition, she became one of the earliest fine artists to portray scenes of outer space. This period is characterized by a more vibrant use of color and a personal cosmic mythology of her own creation. Forner's artistic portrayals of space travel continued until the 1970s. The United States National Air and Space Museum, Smithsonian Institution in Washington, D.C. has several examples of her late period work in its collection including Return of the Astronaut, 1969.

Her work was exhibited widely throughout Argentina, and she was given two Konex Awards (the highest in the Argentine cultural realm) in 1982. Forner died on 10 June 1988 in Buenos Aires. That year, the Buenos Aires Museum of Modern Art organized a retrospective in her honor.

Her work is included in the collection of the Musée national des beaux-arts du Québec, the Art Museum of the Americas, the Museum of Modern Art and others.
