= Lino Enea Spilimbergo =

Argentine artist and engraver

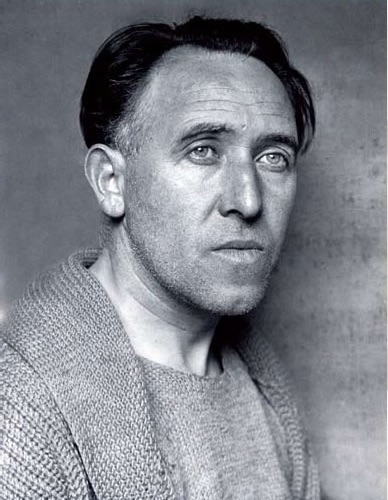
- Born: Lino Claro Honorio Enea Spilimbergo; 12 August 1896; Buenos Aires, Argentina
- Died: 16 March 1964 (aged 67); Unquillo, Argentina
- Education: Academia Nacional de Bellas Artes
- Known for: Artist, engraver
- Website: www.fundacionspilimbergo.org/FRAMES1.HTML

Lino Enea Spilimbergo (born Lino Claro Honorio Enea Spilimbergo; 12 August 1896 – 16 March 1964) was an Argentine artist and engraver considered to be one of the country's most important painters.

== Biography ==
Lino Enea Spilimbergo was born in Buenos Aires in 1896, the son of Italian immigrants, Antonio Enea Spilimbergo and María Giacoboni, and his full name was Lino Claro Honorio Enea Spilimbergo. His early years were spent in the Buenos Aires neighborhood of Palermo. Whilst visiting his mother's relatives in northern Italy with his family he contracted pneumonia, which in later years caused him to suffer from asthma. Returning to Buenos Aires in 1902 he started his schooling, which ended in 1910, when he began working for the post office to support himself. From then on, until 1924, he kept this job in parallel with his painting. In 1917, he graduated from the Academia Nacional de Bellas Artes and in September of that year his father died.

At the age of 22, he began writing his autobiography, and in 1920 he wrote a booklet about his thoughts, in order to arrange and organize his life and work. In 1921 the Salón Nacional de Bellas Artes accepted, for the first time, one of his pieces and later that year, following the recommendation of his doctor to live in a place with a drier climate, his employer agreed to relocate him to Desamparados in San Juan Province. He stayed there until he resigned his job in 1924, and it was during this period that he had his first individual exhibition.

Using prize money he had won in an art exhibition, he traveled to Europe in 1925 and visited Florence, Venice, Palermo and other Italian cities in search of classical art sources, paying particular attention to frescos. He then moved to Paris where he studied in the mornings at the Académie de la Grande Chaumière and in the studio of the French painter, sculptor and writer André Lhote and came under the influence of post-cubism and the work of Paul Cézanne.

In 1928, he returned to Argentina to live in Las Lomitas, San Juan Province, and in 1929, his son Antonio was born. A year later, he moved back to Buenos Aires and in 1933, together with the Mexican artist David Alfaro Siqueiros and the Argentine artists Antonio Berni and Lozano produced the mural entitled Ejercicio Plástico. To explain their principles and ideas, the group produced a document under the same title. The involvement in this work was a decisive event in Spilimbergo's life and marked the start of his career as a muralist.

In 1945, together with Berni, Juan Carlos Castagnino, Manuel Colmeiro Guimarás and Demetrio Urruchúa, he was one of the contributors to the frescos which decorate the large central cupola of Galerías Pacífico on pedestrian Florida Street, Buenos Aires.

During his years as a painter, Spilimbergo developed a very personal synthesis of diverse styles, in particular the classical and the modern. From the post-impressionism of his first period, dominated by landscapes and local scenes, he later passed on to a study of the human figure. His figures were solid and monumental and the surreal and metaphorical often found its way into his works. His subjects included the marginalised and the disinherited, from the slum dwellers of Buenos Aires to the rural workers of the northern provinces.

He taught art at Instituto de Arte Gráfico during the period 1934–1939 where his students included Medardo Pantoja (1906–1976), Eolo Pons (1914), Luis Lusnich (1911–1995), and Leopoldo Presas (1915). At the National University of Cuyo, he his students included Carlos Alonso. Spilimbergo's pictures were widely exhibited in Latin America, the United States and Europe during this period.

Spilimbergo died in 1964 in the small town of Unquillo in Córdoba Province.
