= Mazza (surname) =

Mazza is a surname of Italian origin. Notable people with the surname include:

- Benedetta Mazza (born 1989), Italian beauty queen, actress, television presenter and model
- Bruno Mazza (1924–2012), Italian footballer
- Chris Mazza (born 1989), American baseball pitcher
- Cole Mazza (born 1995), American football player
- Cris Mazza, American novelist
- Damiano Mazza (artist), 16th century Italian painter
- Gianni Mazza (born 1944), Italian composer and conductor
- Giorgio Mazza (born 1939), Italian hurdler
- Giuseppe Mazza (1817–1884), Italian painter
- Giuseppe Maria Mazza (1653–1741), Italian sculptor
- Joseph Mazza (1905–1993), American politician
- Marco Mazza (born 1977), Italian long-distance runner
- Mario Mazza (1882–1959), Italian educator
- Pablo Mazza (born 1987), Argentine footballer
- Paolo Mazza (1901–1981), Italian football manager
- Pier Filippo Mazza (born 1988), Sammarinese footballer
- Raúl Mazza (1888–1948), Argentine painter
- Richard Mazza (1939–2024), American businessman and politician
- Robert Mazza, Judge of the Court of Appeal of the Supreme Court of Western Australia
- Salvador Mazza (1886–1946), Argentine physician and epidemiologist
- Tommaso del Mazza, 14th-century Florentine painter
- Valeria Mazza (born 1972), Argentine fashion model
- Ventura Mazza (c. 1560 - 1638), Italian painter
- Viviana Mazza (born 1978), Italian writer/journalist

== See also ==
- Mazza (disambiguation)
- Mazzo (surname)
- Mazzi
