= Christiano Junior (photographer) =

Portuguese photographer in Argentina (1932–1902)

- José Christiano de Freitas Henriques Junior
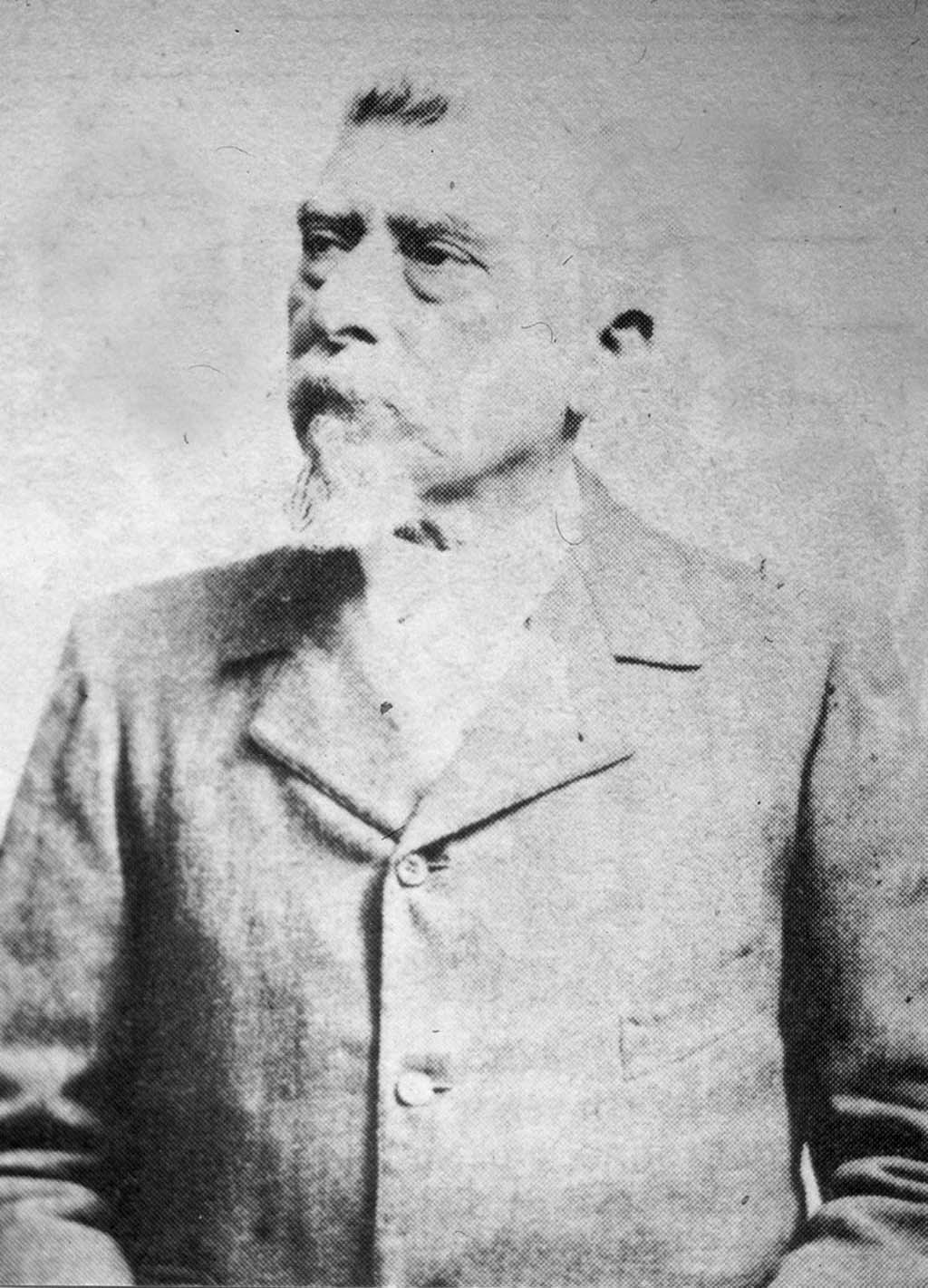
- Junior c. 1872
- Born: 1832; Santa Cruz das Flores, Azores Islands, Portugal
- Died: 1902 (aged 69–70); Asunción, Paraguay
- Known for: Photography
- Notable work: Vistas y Costumbres de la República Argentina (1876)

José Christiano de Freitas Henriques Junior (1832–1902), mostly known as Christiano Junior, was a Portuguese-born photographer. He was one of the most prominent photographers in Argentina in the 19th century.

During a time, Christiano Junior was associated with British colleague Alexander Witcomb, who would later acquire Junior's studio and photographs, adding them to his own material. In 1970, Witcomb's entire artwork became part of the General Archive of the Nation as an evidence of the history of Argentina registered on photographs.

== Biography ==
Born in Flores island, Azores Islands, Portugal, he emigrated to Brazil in 1855. It is unclear how Christiano Junior learned the techniques of photography. In 1863 he began its activities in Rio de Janeiro. During that period, the subjects of his photos are mainly slaves and people affected by Lymphatic filariasis.

During the period he lived in Rio de Janeiro, he photographed several African-descendants slaves, which were almost half of the city's population by then (110,000 out of a total of 266,000 inhabitants). His camera caught the slaves in poses that staged their professional activities. Most pictures depicted street vendors.

In 1865 he moved to Buenos Aires with his wife and two children, opening his first studio in 1867. It was located in Florida street N° 159. Soon after, he moved to another building that provided more space. At the beginning of the 1870s, C. Junior opened another studio in Artes street, named "Fotografía de la Infancia" (Childhood Photography), hosted by his son José V. Freitas Henriques.

Christiano Junior soon gained reputation in the city, being requested by personalities such as Domingo Faustino Sarmiento, Adolfo Alsina, Lucio V. Mansilla and Luis Sáenz Peña among others. Between 1873 and 1875 he took more than 4,000 photos, with an average of 5 customers per day.

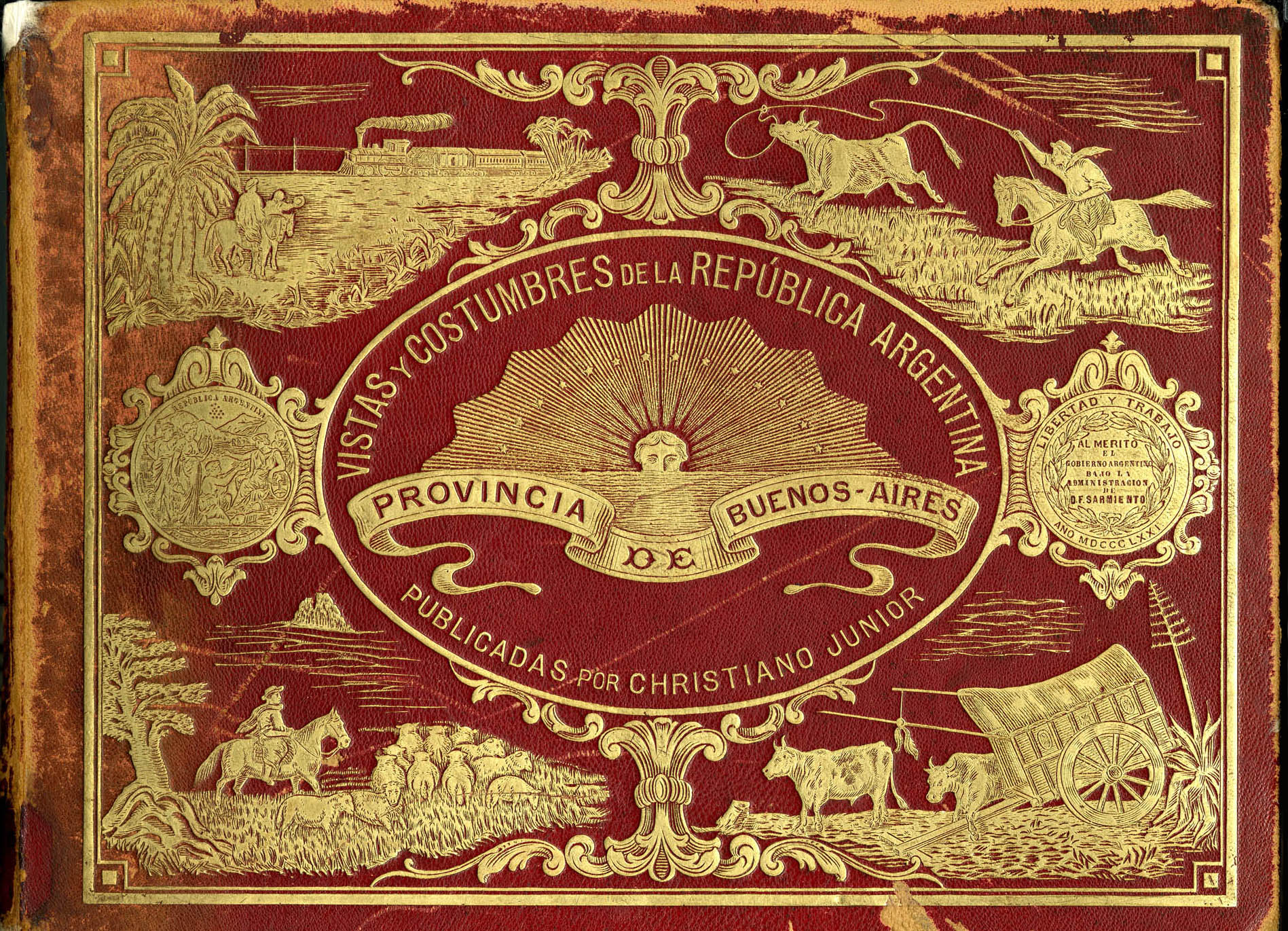
Cover to Vistas y Costumbres de la República Argentina (1876), where Christiano Junior published his work

Since 1875 Christiano Junior was the official photographer and also member of the Sociedad Rural Argentina, even collaborating as a writer. He had a keen interest in agriculture, and as a result of his friendship with many managers of the institution, he was called for the project. Junior collaborated with the institution until 1878, when he sold his studio.

During 1876 and 1877 two volumes of a photo album were released. They were part of a project named Album de vistas y costumbres de la República Argentina desde el Atlántico a Los Andes, passing through some cities of Argentina and taking photos of each one of them. To make the trip to complete his project, Christiano Junior sold his studio to the Witcomb & Mackern society (predecessor or famous Casa Witcomb) in 1878.

After leaving Buenos Aires, he went on an "artistic tour" (in his own words) visiting the Santa Fe, Córdoba, Mendoza, San Luis, San Juan, Santiago del Estero, Catamarca, Tucumán, Salta and Jujuy provinces to complete the work stated with Vistas y costumbres....

My plan is vast and when it is complete the Argentine Republic will have no stone or historic tree, from the Atlantic to the Andes, that has not been subjected to the life-giving focus of the camera obscura.

— Christiano Junior in 1876

Nevertheless, and after four years of trip throughout Argentina the artist ceased his activity as a photographer in 1883. Even unfinished, the work made by Christiano Junior during those 4 years is considered one of the most important and ambitious projects in Argentine and Latin America.

Christiano Junior died in Asunción, Paraguay, in 1902.

== Bibliography ==
=== Vistas y costumbres de la Republica Argentina (1877) ===
The album included 12 photos of the city of Buenos Aires, each one with a description (written by Mariano Pelliza and Ángel Carranza) in Spanish, English, French, and German languages. Subjects depicted were (in order of appearance):

- Buenos Aires (panoramic view)
- Administración de Rentas Nacionales building
- Palermo (Note: Depicts the residence of Juan Manuel de Rosas.)
- Equestrian statue of José de San Martín
- Gasómetro primitivo
- Estación Central
- Casa Rosada
- Palacio del Congreso (Note: Not the current palace but the first building that operated from 1864 to 1905.)
- Plaza de Lorea (Note: Main subject is the water tank located on the center of the square.)
- Casa de Expósitos (orphanage)
- Pueyrredón Bridge
- Plaza de la Victoria

=== Vistas y costumbres de la Republica Argentina (1877) ===
Second album with 12 photos also, which depicted:

- Metropolitan Cathedral
- Escenas de la playa (launders at Río de la Plata)
- Buenos Aires and Ensenada Port Railway bridge
- Escenas de la playa (fishers at Río de la Plata)
- Statue of Valentín Alsina (Note: At his grave in Recoleta Cemetery.)
- El naranjero (oranges street vendor)
- Quinta del General Brown
- La Boca del Riachuelo
- Bank of the Province of Buenos Aires
- Santa Felicitas Church (Note: Located in Barracas, built in 1875.)
- Hospital Italiano
- Dique de San Fernando

=== Other books ===
- Tratado prático de vinicultura, destilaria e licoreria (with prologue by Eduardo L. Holmberg

== Gallery ==
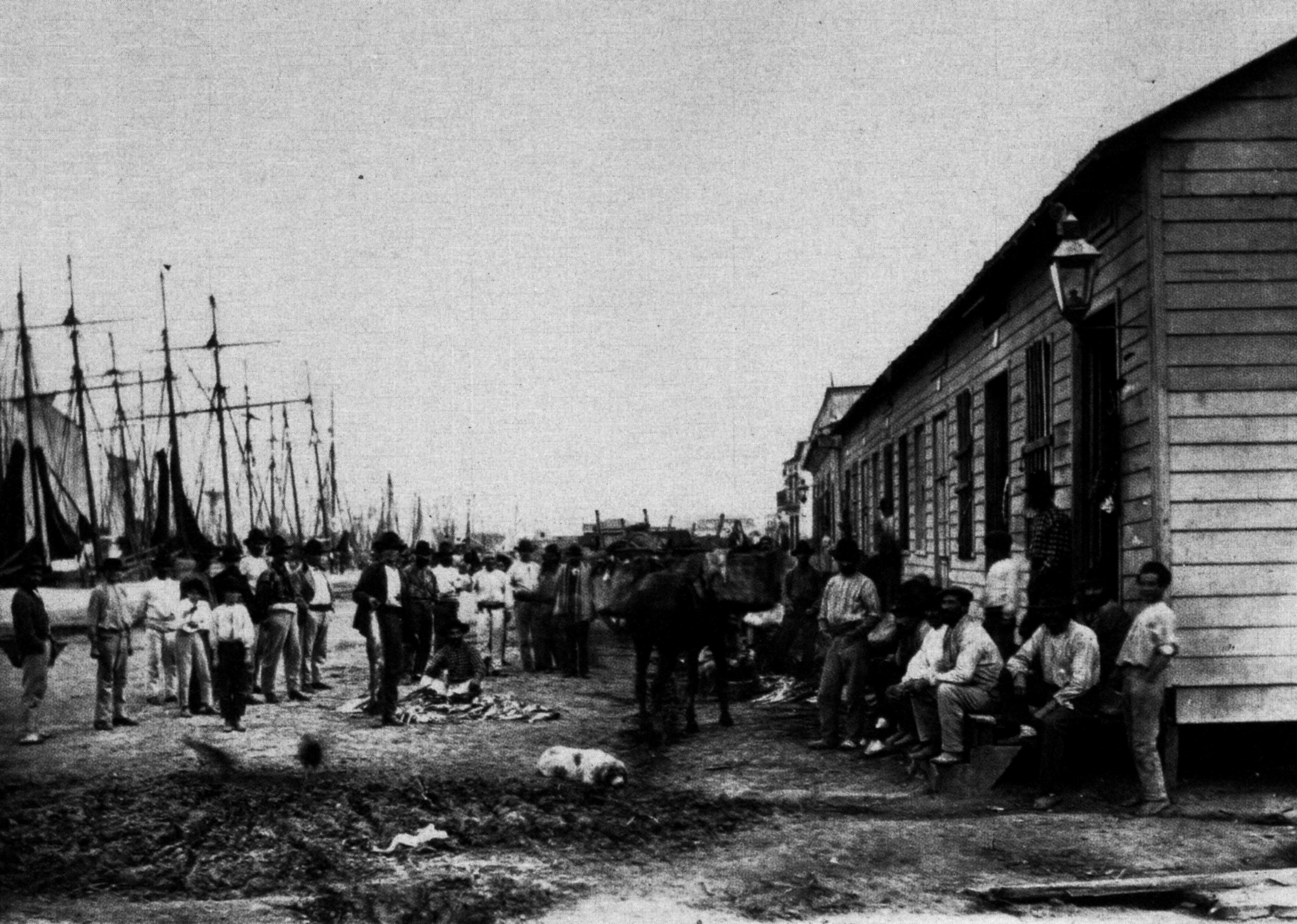
Workers of the Riachuelo

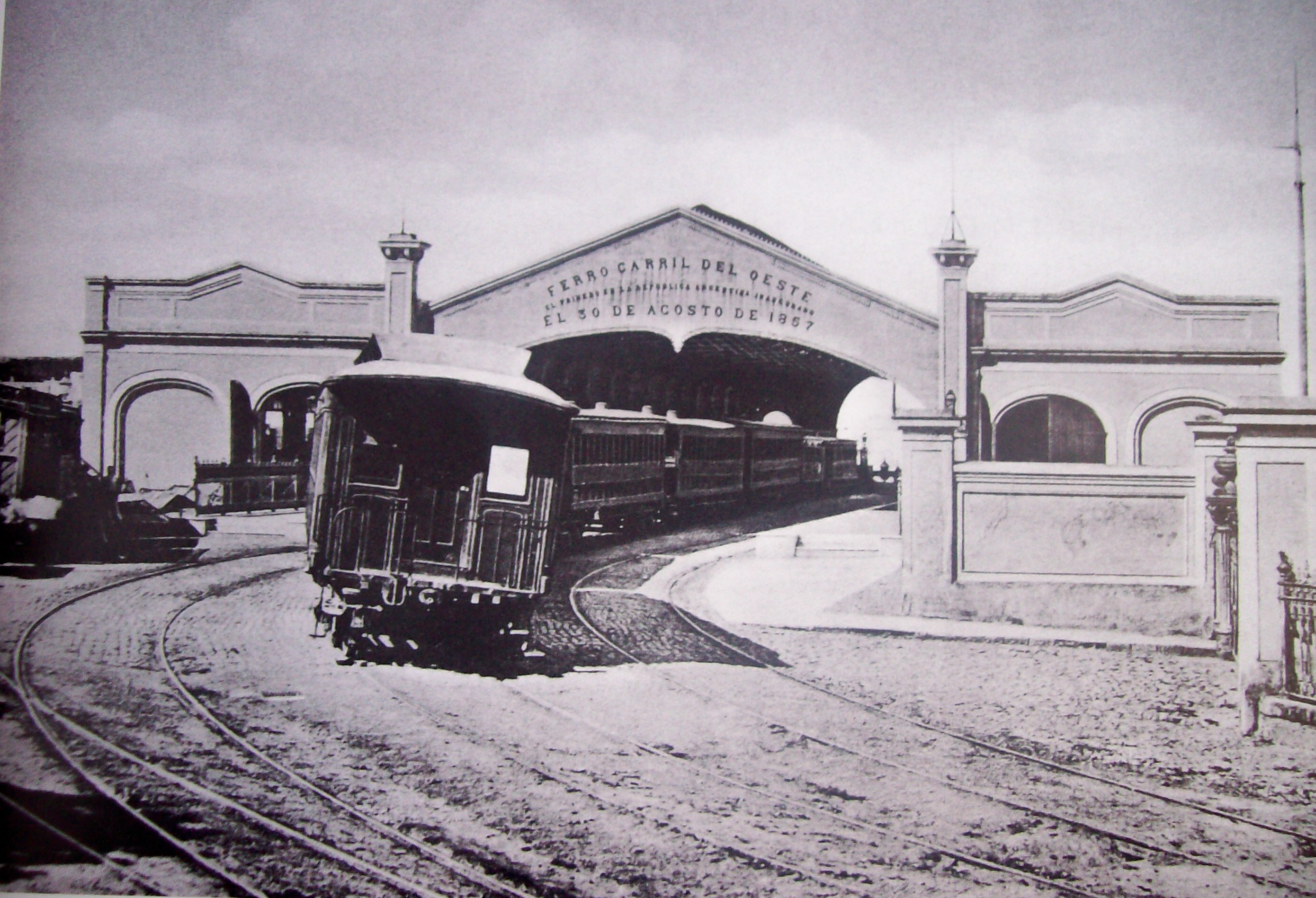
Del Parque station of Buenos Aires Western Railway

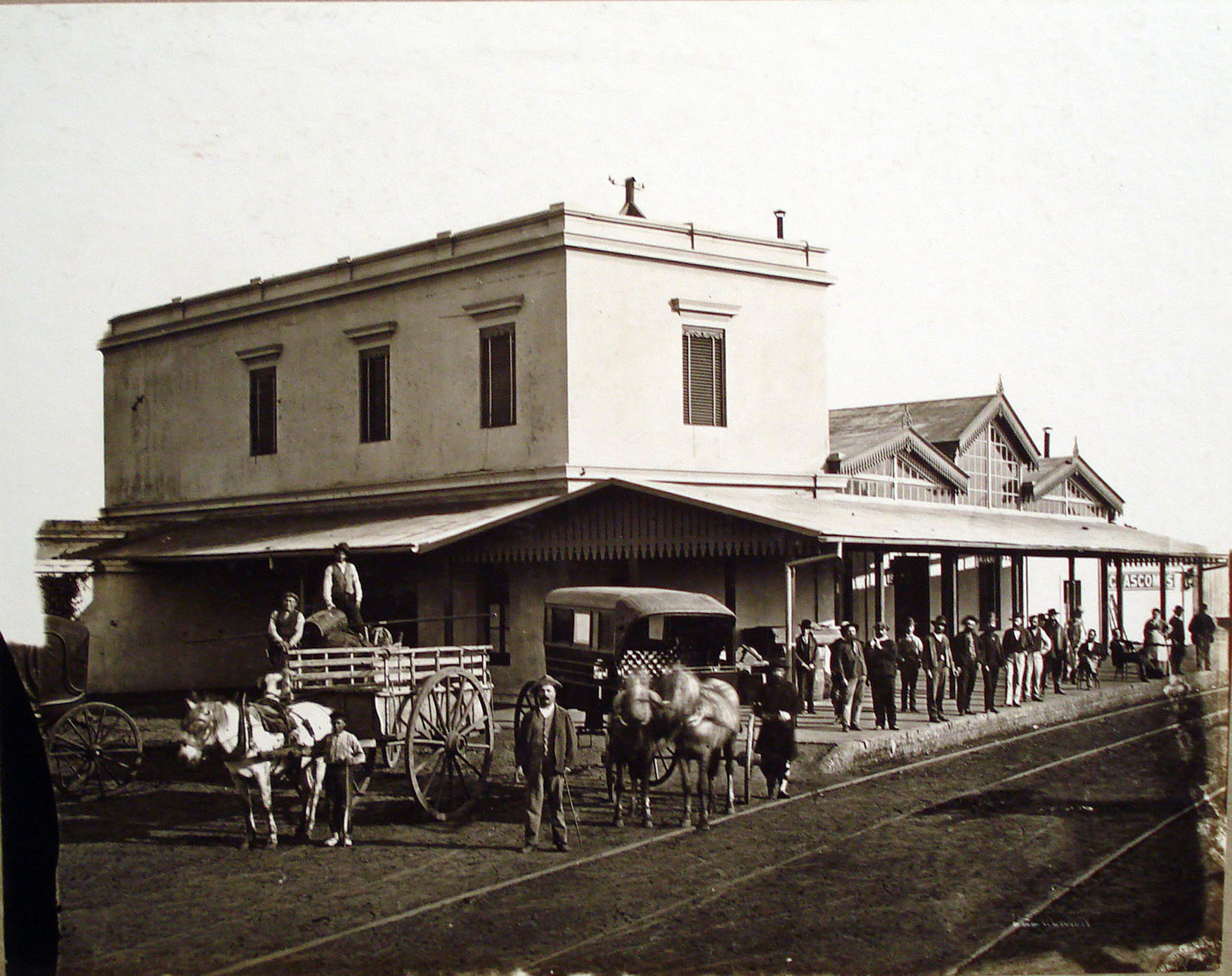
Chascomús station

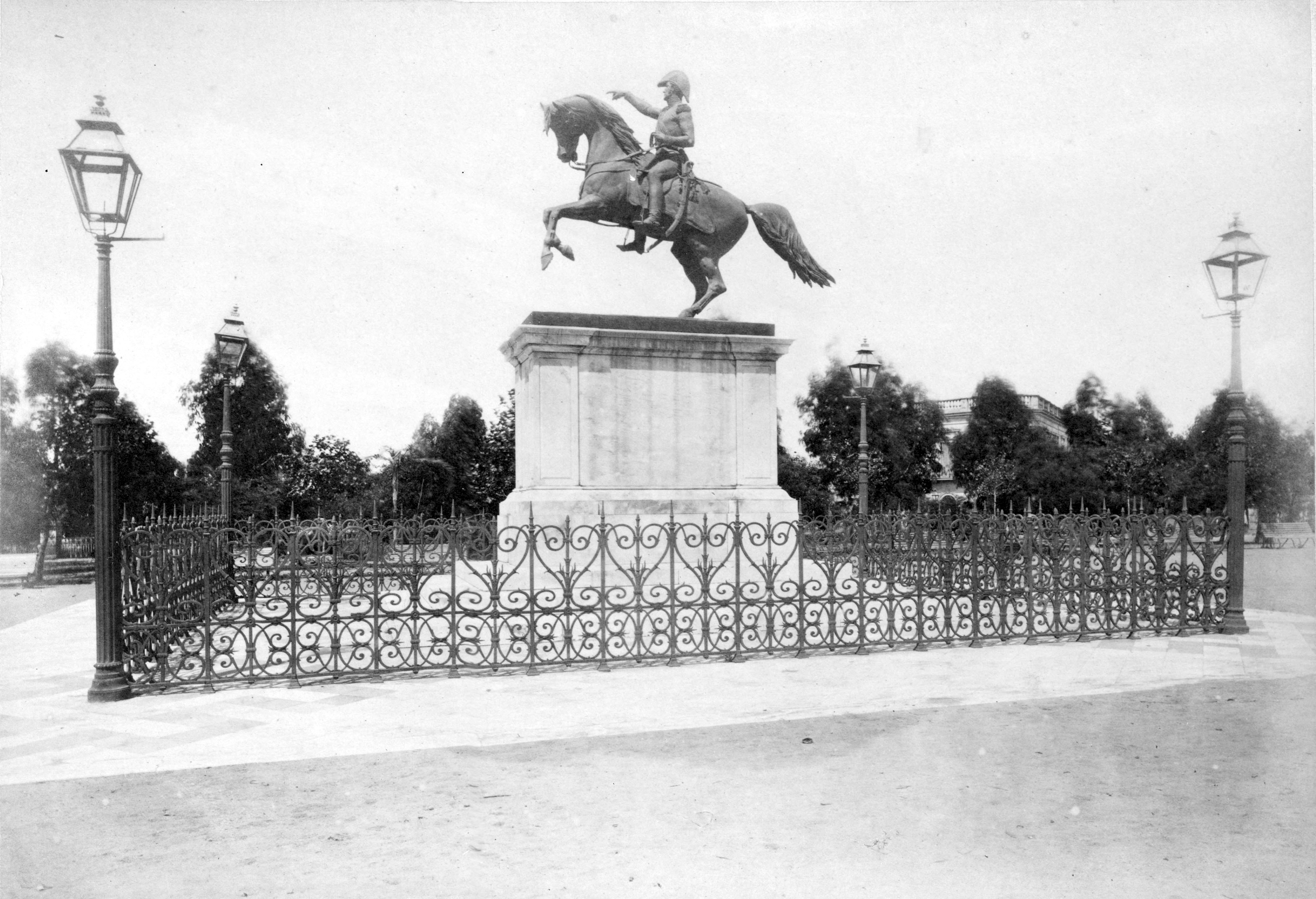
Equestrian statue of José de San Martín

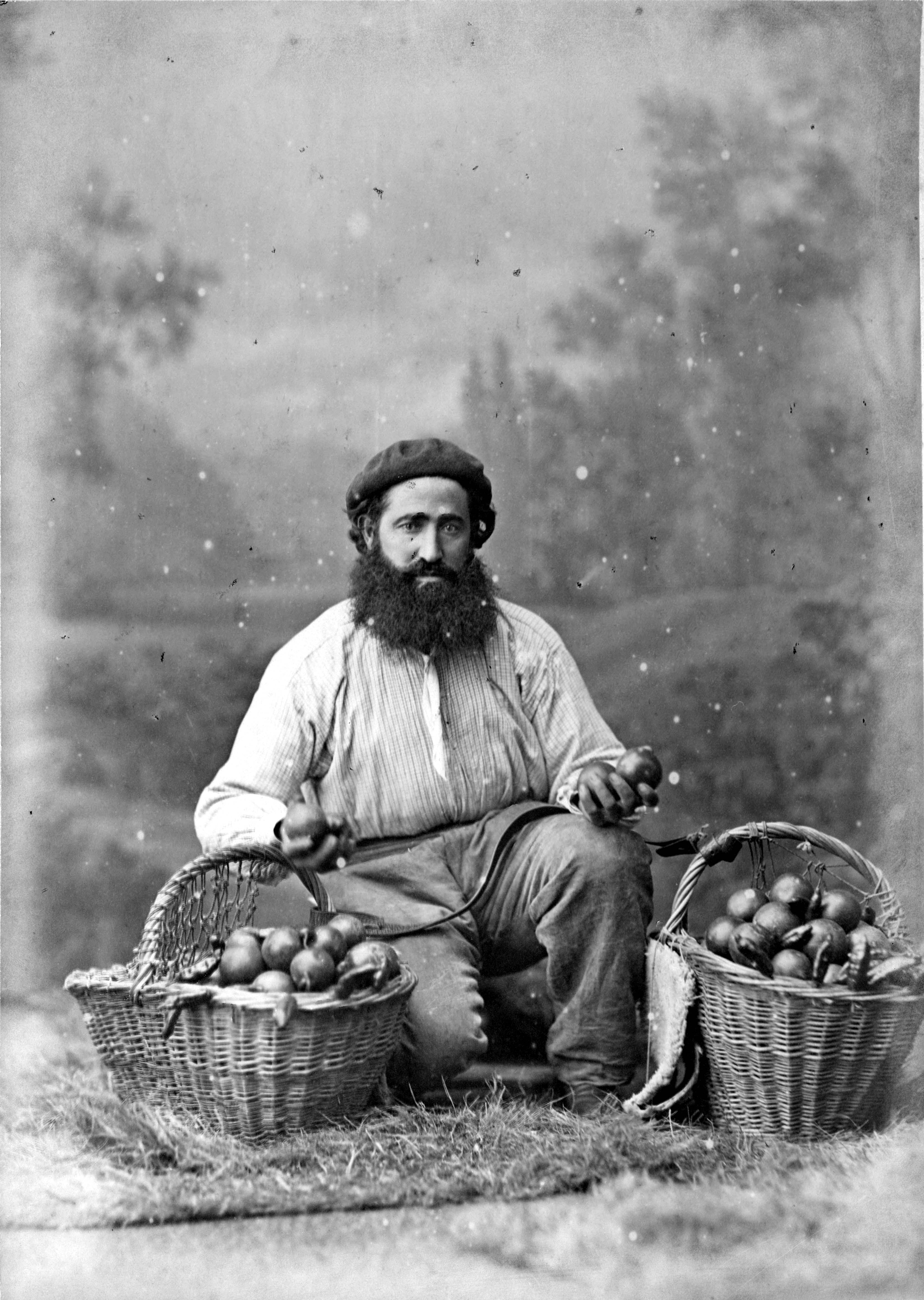
Street vendor

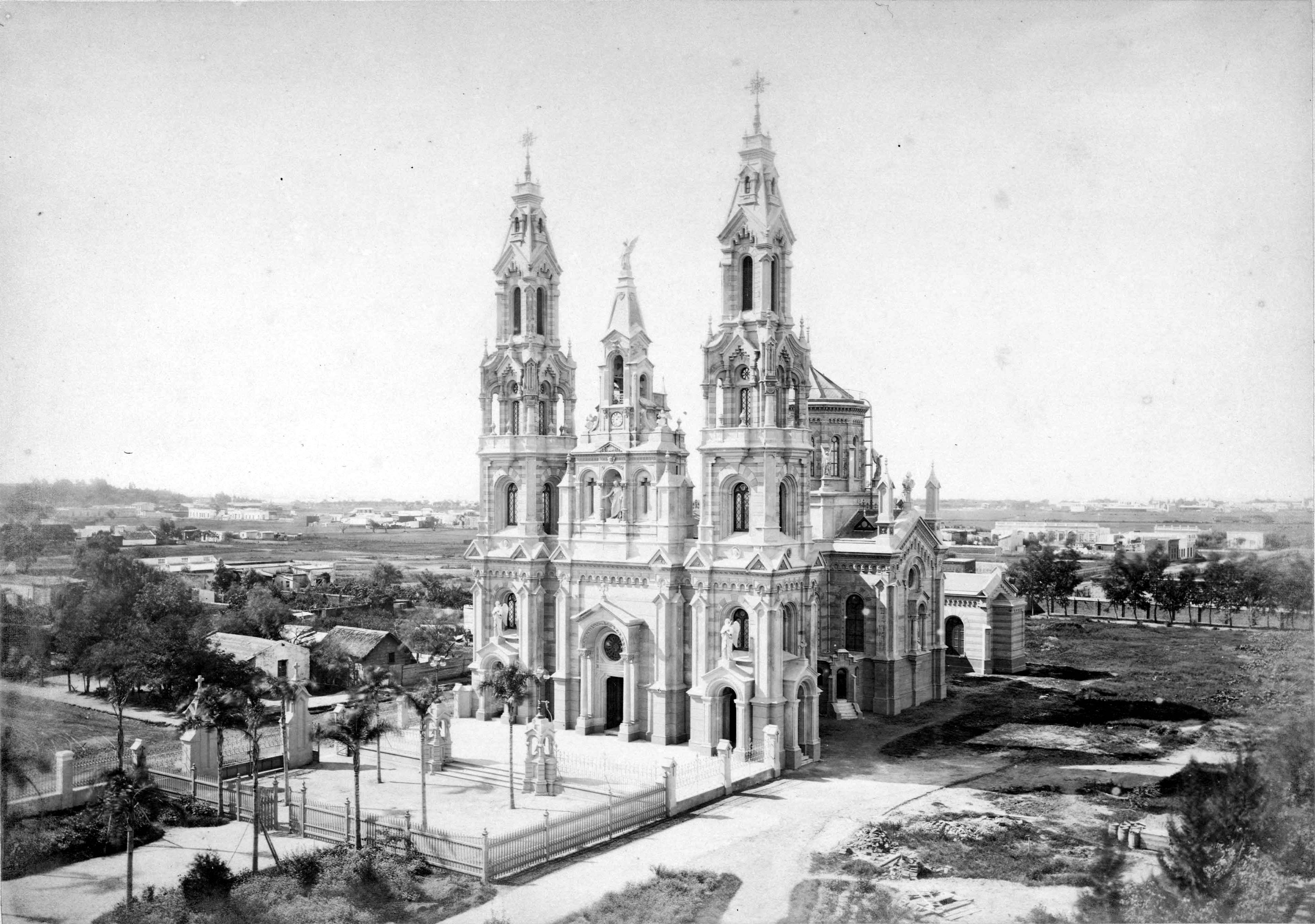
Santa Felicitas Church

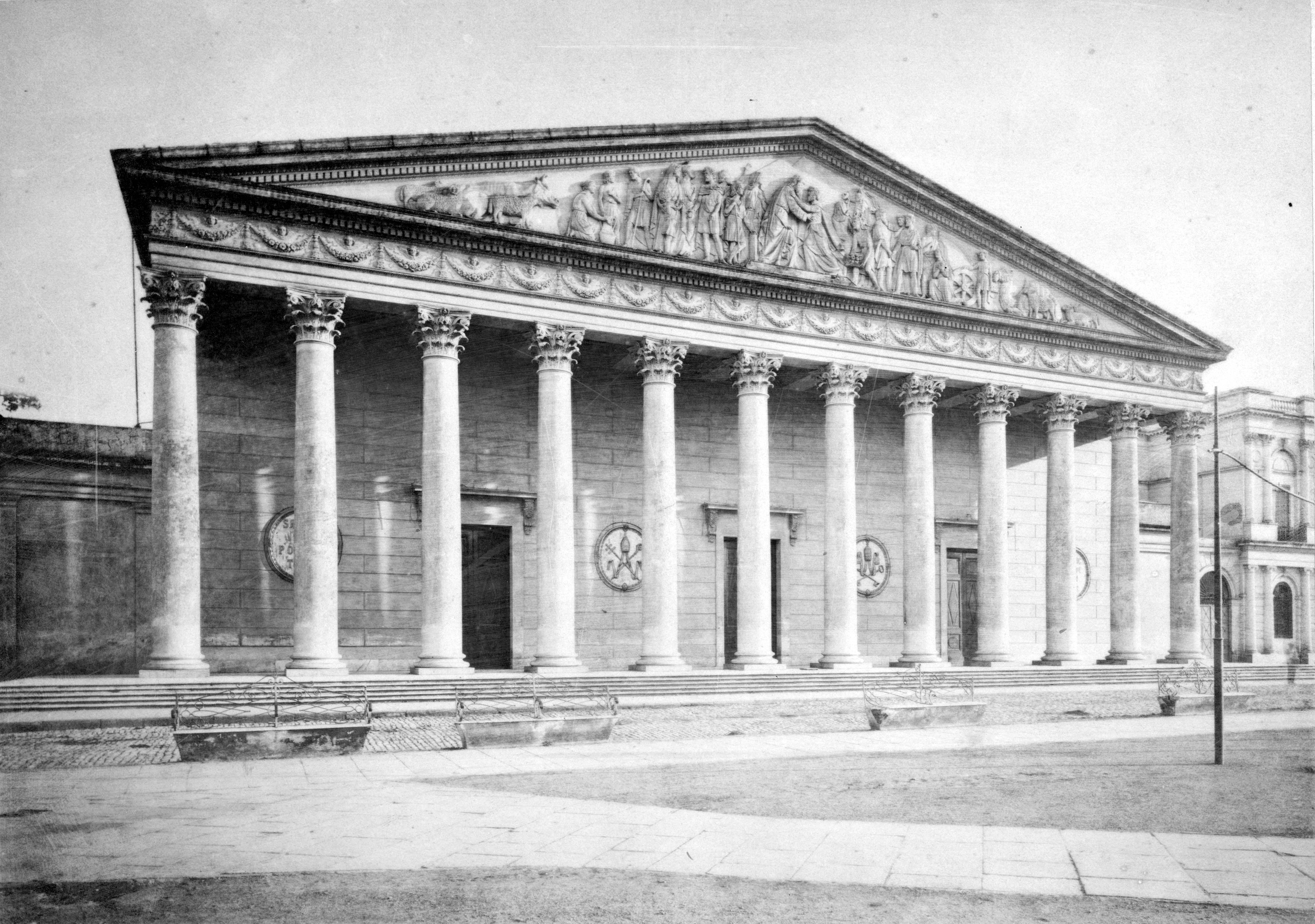
Buenos Aires Metropolitan Cathedral

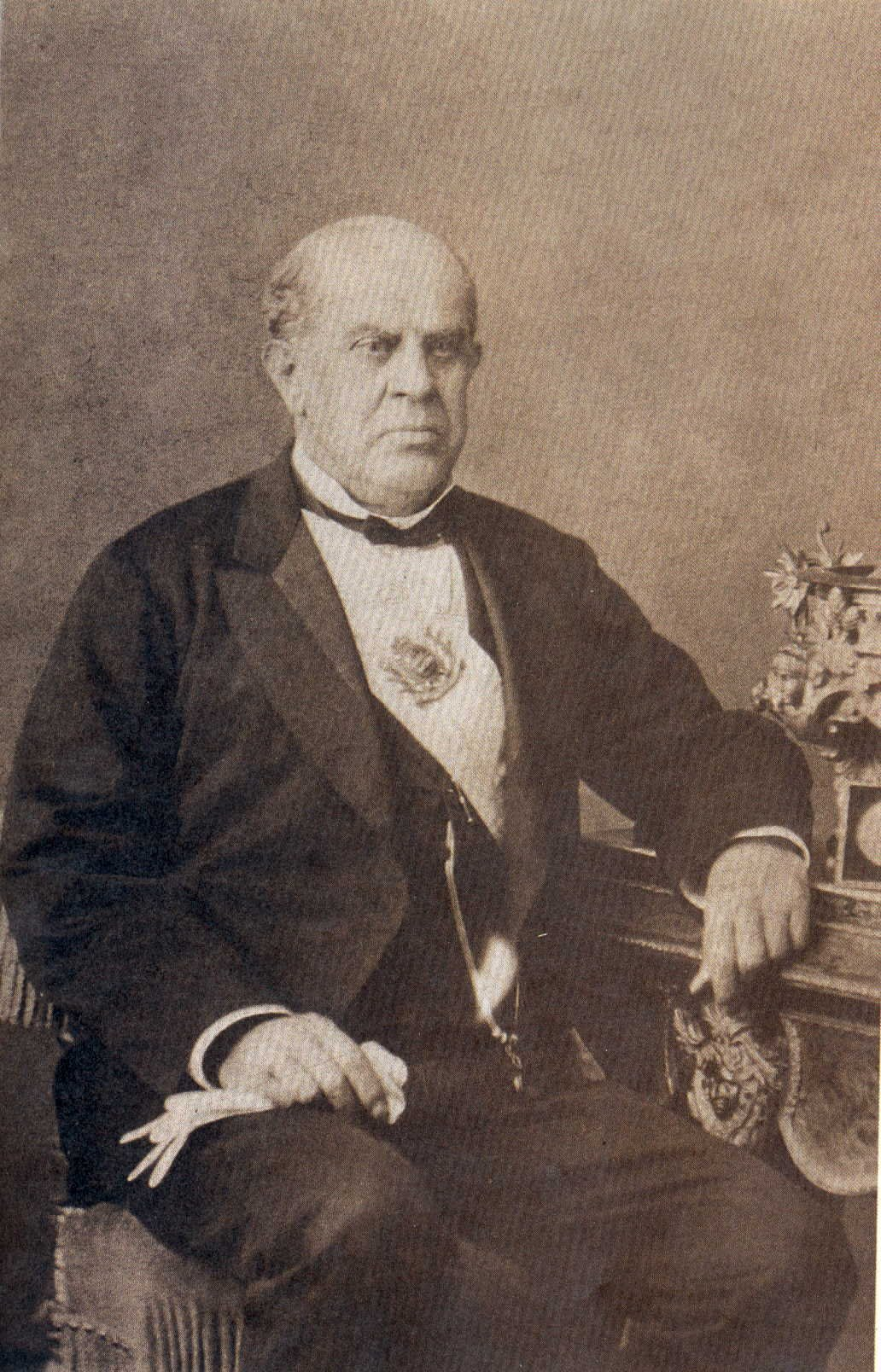
Domingo Sarmiento

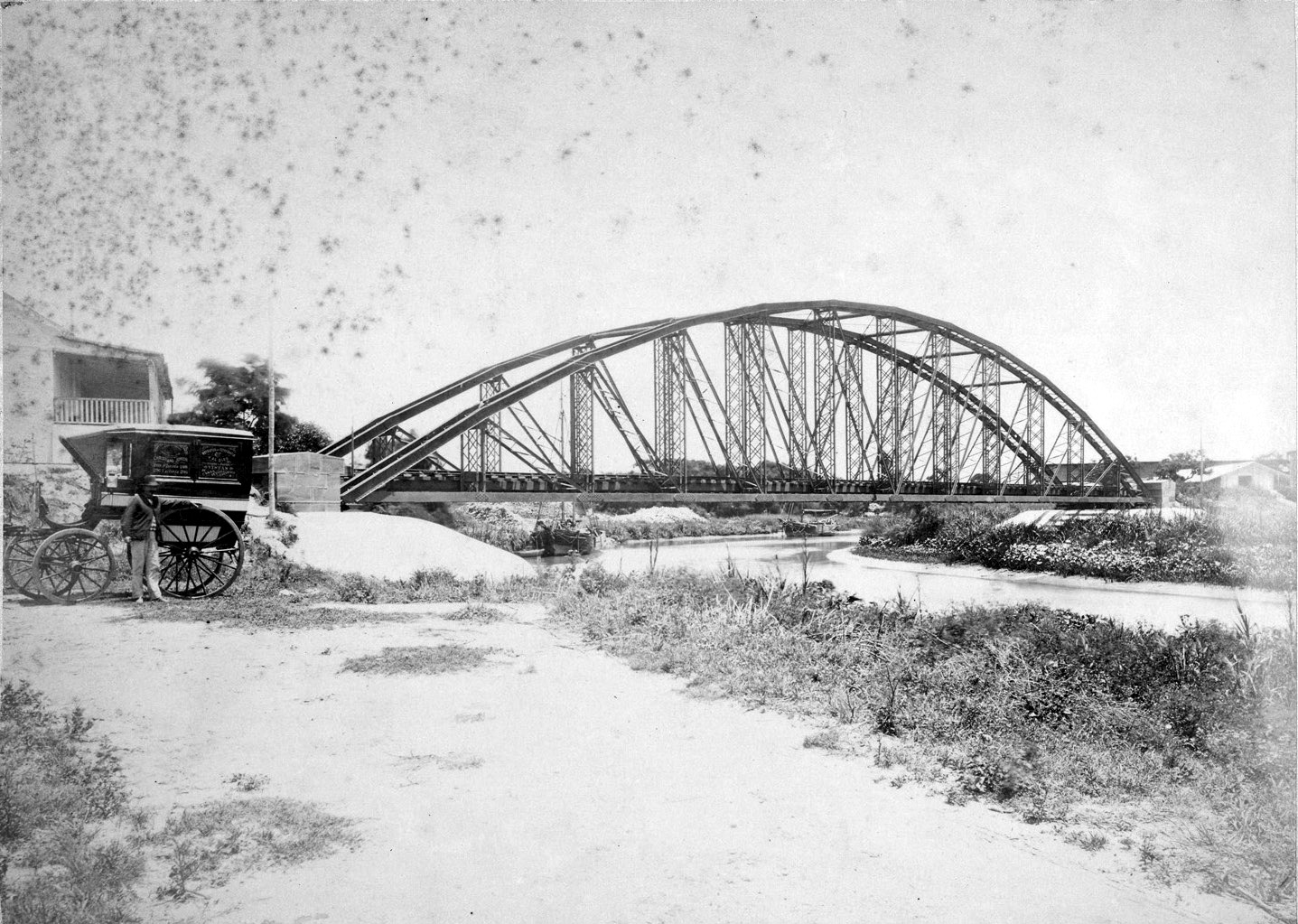
BAEPR bridge over the Riachuelo.

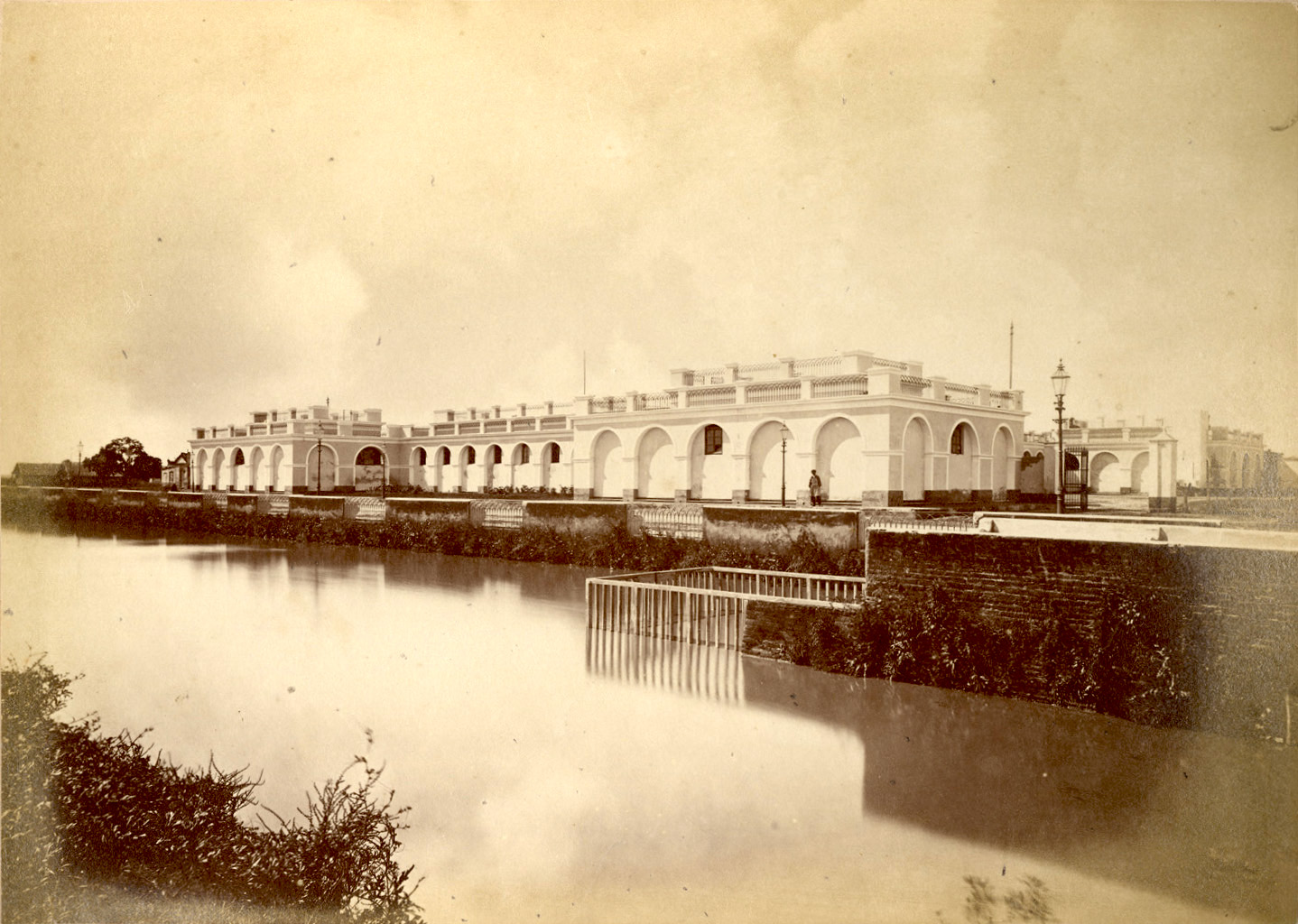
Residence of J.M. de Rosas

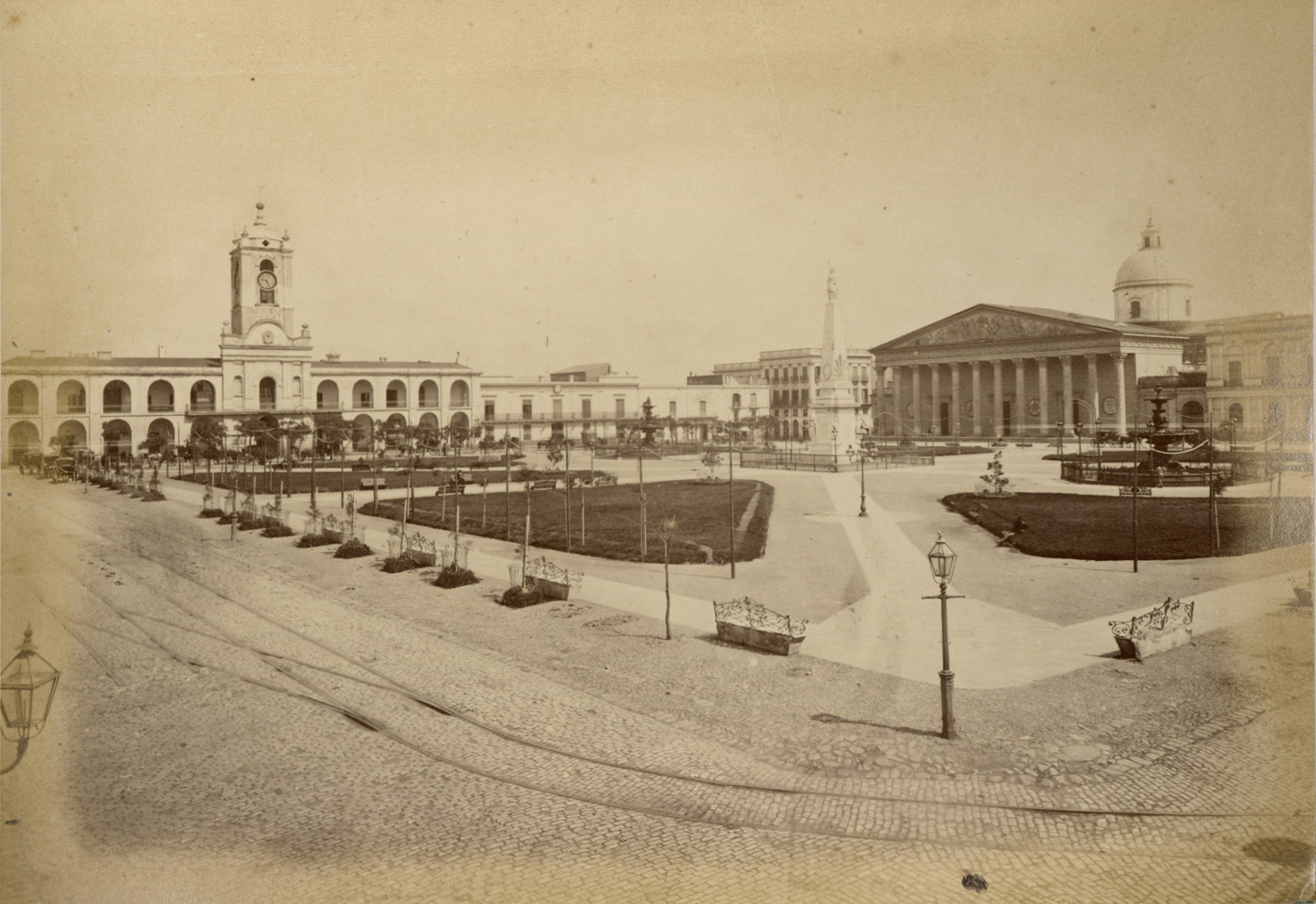
Plaza de Mayo

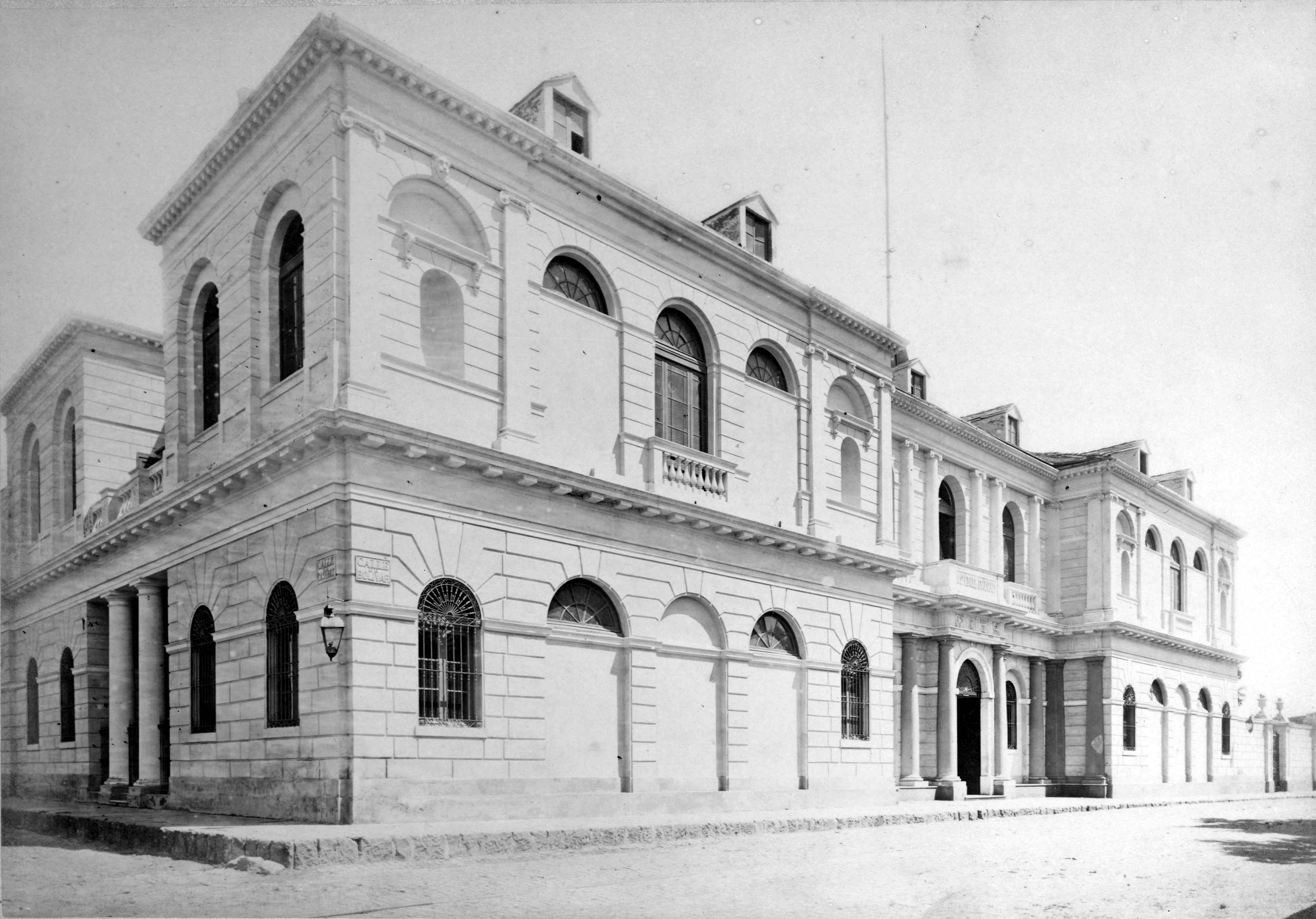
Hospital Italiano de Buenos Aires

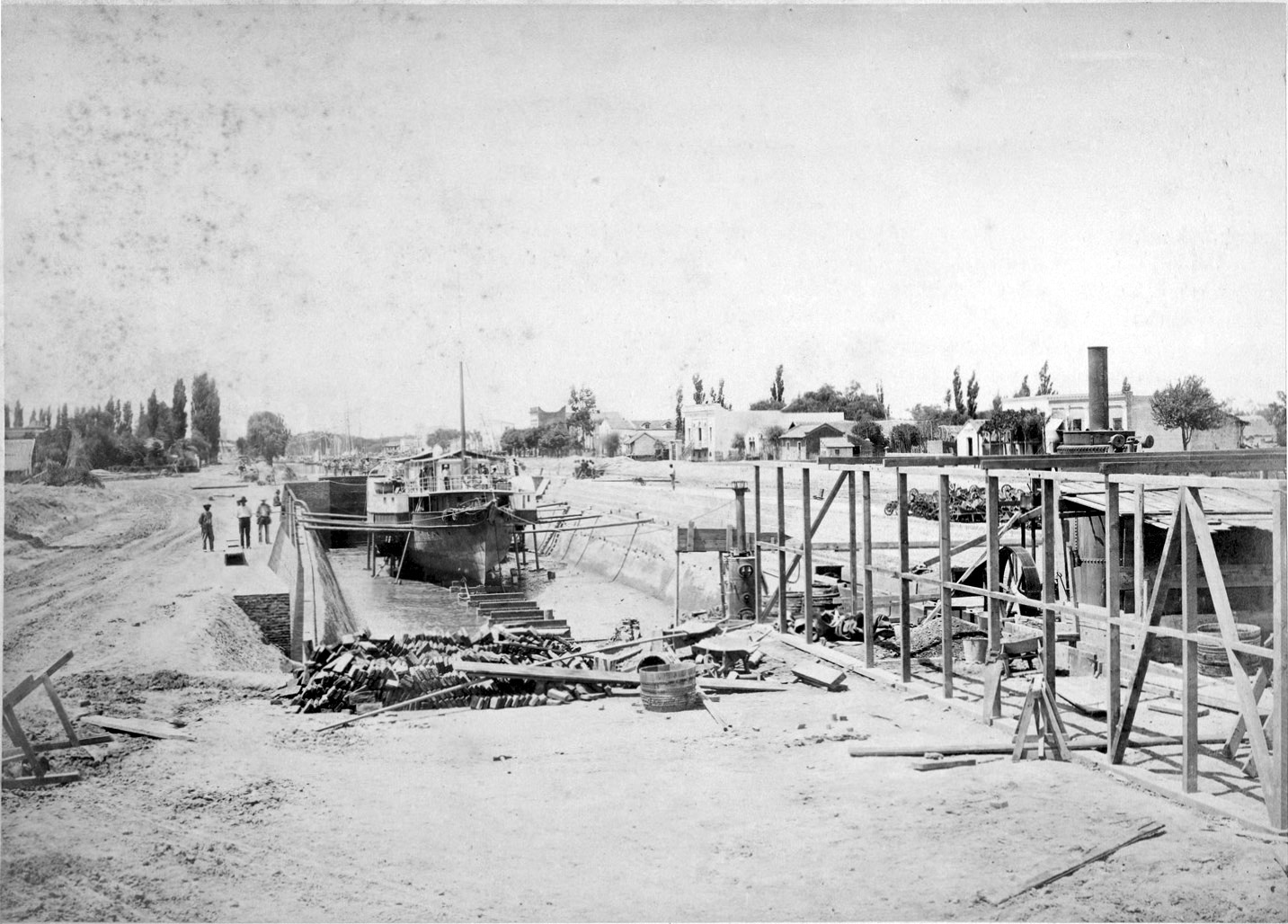
San Fernando levee

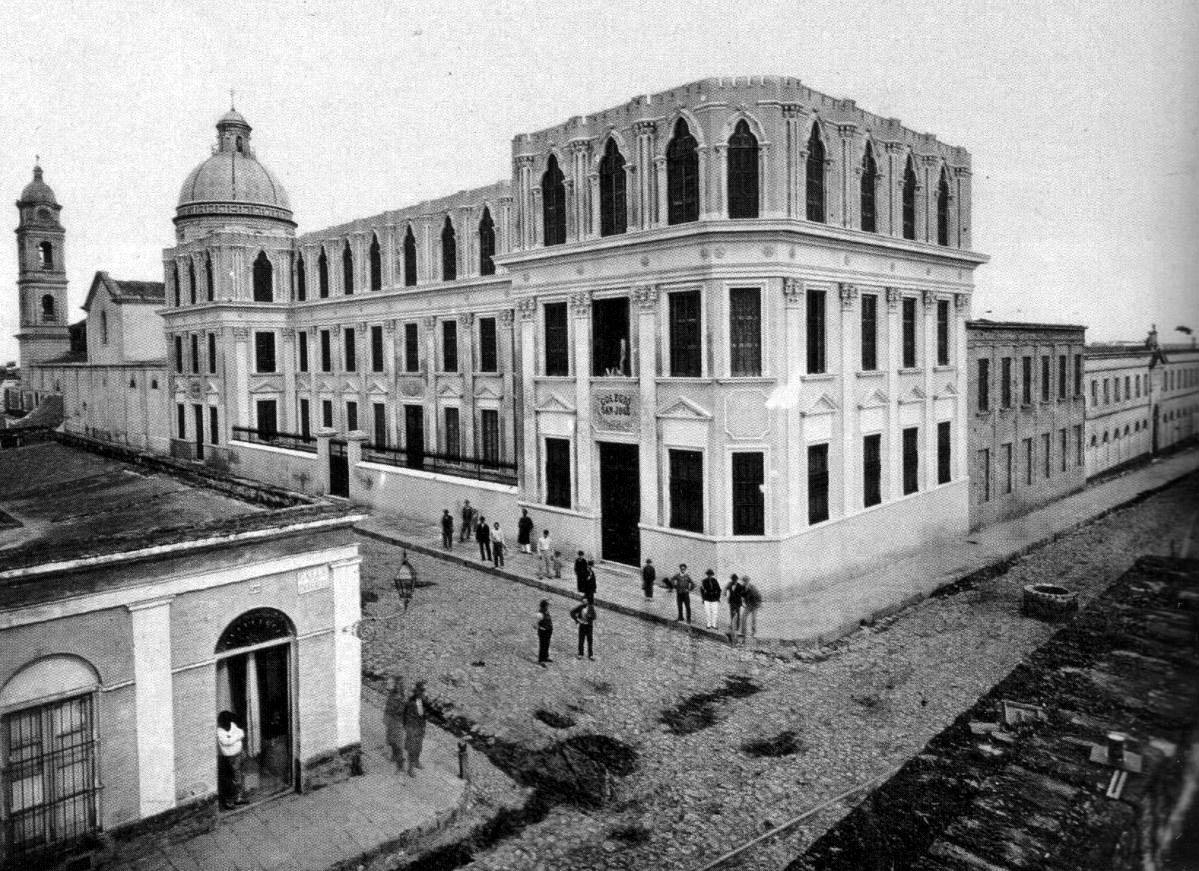
Streets of Buenos Aires

== See also ==
- General Archive of the Nation
- Alexander Witcomb
