= Mazzo (surname) =

Mazzo is a surname of Italian origin. Notable people with the surname include:

- Carolyne Mazzo (born 1997), Brazilian swimmer
- Kay Mazzo (born 1946), American former ballet dancer and educator
- Lucas Mazzo (born 1994), Brazilian racewalking athlete

== See also ==
- Mazzo (disambiguation)
- Mazza (surname)
- Mazzi
- Mazo (surname)
