= Mazo (surname) =

Mazo is a Spanish language surname, which may be an occupational surname for a person who used a mallet, or mazo in Spanish. Mazo may also be a locational surname for a person from one of the places called Mazo in Spain. The name may refer to:

- Alec Mazo (born 1978), American television producer
- Alejandro del Mazo (born 1980), Mexican politician
- Alfredo del Mazo González (1943–2019), Mexican politician
- Alfredo del Mazo Maza (born 1975), Mexican politician
- Alfredo del Mazo Vélez (1904–1975), Mexican politician
- Earl Mazo (1919–2007), American journalist
- Gerardo del Mazo Morales (born 1976), Mexican politician
- José Ricardo Mazó (1927–1987), Paraguayan poet
- Juan Bautista Martínez del Mazo (1612–1667), Spanish painter
- Margarita del Mazo (born 1960), Spanish writer
- Michael Mazo, Canadian filmmaker
- Nerea Mazo (born 1998), Spanish actress
- Santiago José García Mazo (1768–1849), Spanish writer

== See also ==
- Mazo (disambiguation)
- Mazzo (surname)
