= Mazza =

Mazza may refer to:

- Mazza (surname), Italian surname
- Mazza Gallerie, an upscale shopping mall in the Friendship Heights neighborhood of northwest Washington, D.C.
- Mazza Museum, an art museum located at The University of Findlay in Findlay, Ohio
- Mazza Point, snow-covered headland lying between Brahms Inlet and Mendelssohn Inlet, on Alexander Island, Antarctica
- Salvador Mazza, Salta, also known as "Pocitos", a town in northern Argentina
- Mazzatello (abbreviated mazza), a method of capital punishment
- Baron Carlo Mazza, a 1948 comedy film

== See also ==
- Mazzo (disambiguation)
- Mazzi
