= Alexander Witcomb =

Alexander Spiers Witcomb
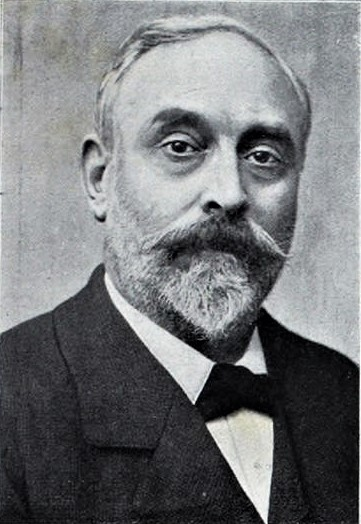
- Born: 1838; Winchester, England
- Died: 1905 (aged 66–67); Buenos Aires, Argentina
- Occupation: Photographer

Alexander Spiers Witcomb (also known as Alejandro S. Witcomb in Argentina; Winchester, 1838 – Buenos Aires, 1905) was a British photographer whose work is considered part of the historical heritage of Argentina, where he established the first photography studio.

The Witcomb collection contains about 500,000 negatives, although people from his era stated that the General Archive of the Nation could have received about 700,000 negatives at that time to become part of the Archive collection.

== Biography ==
Witcomb was born in Winchester, Hampshire, in 1838 and studied photography in France, then moved to Rio de Janeiro where he worked as a trader for some time. In 1872, he again moved to Montevideo, where he worked in a bank and then as a photographer in the city of Mercedes. Witcomb moved again to Rosario, Argentina, where he worked with Christiano Junior, from whom he later acquired his studio and negatives. The partnership lasted until Witcomb travelled to Buenos Aires.

Witcomb not only took pictures at his studio but in the streets, where he photographed the social life of Argentina. Because of his influences, Witcomb made several portraits of diverse presidents of Argentina, as well as the high class of Buenos Aires in his social meetings.

In 1880, Witcomb established his own studio, located on Florida street n° 364, which later became the most traditional photograph studio in Argentina. Starting as a photography studio, it then expanded its activities to an art gallery where new artists had the opportunity to show their work. Following Witcomb's death in 1905, his son took his place continued with the exhibitions and work until his dead in 1945. The company continued working, being managed by Witcomb's partners until 1970, when the material became part of the General Archive of the Nation as an evidence of the history of Argentina registered on photographs.

== Witcomb Collection ==
The collection is made up by photographic plates that belonged to Wicbomb gallery, but it is believed that some pictures could have been also taken by Christiano Junior when he and Witcomb were partners.

Witcomb witnessed and photographed the life of Buenos Aires in many aspects: streets, notable persons, transport, celebrations, social and historic facts.

Witcomb transformed all his photographic work, made up of about 300,000 plates, in real masterpieces because of both, his images' rich aesthetics and the invaluable value of the historic recording that they represent.

The beginning of Witcomb galleries were as photographic art. In 1897, Alexander Witcomb established in Florida street n° 364 of Buenos Aires city, with the purpose of exhibiting artwork. Since the galleries started activities until their closure in 1971, about 1,900 exhibitions were made there.

=== Photography gallery ===
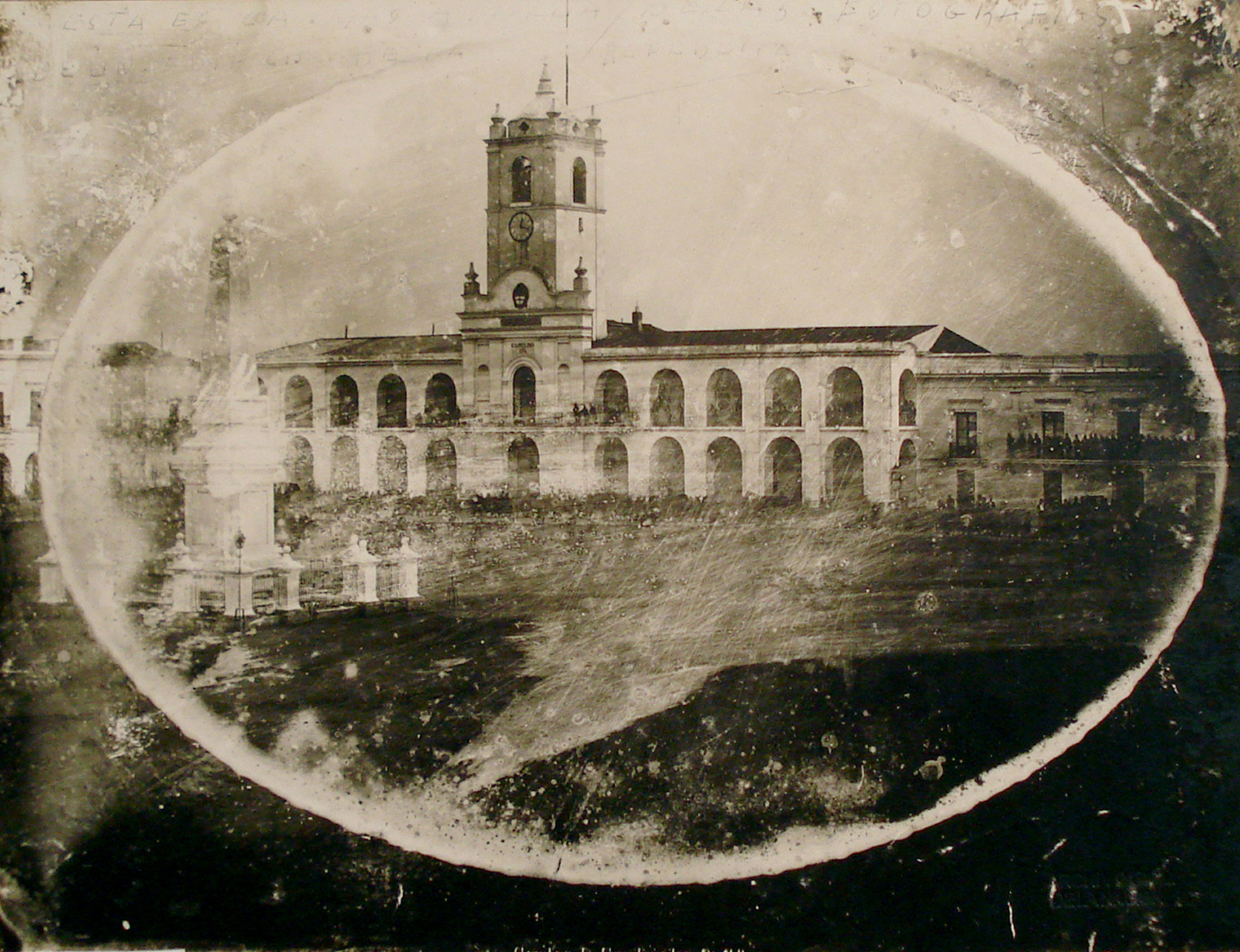
The first photo of the Cabildo ever taken, c. 1842 – 1850

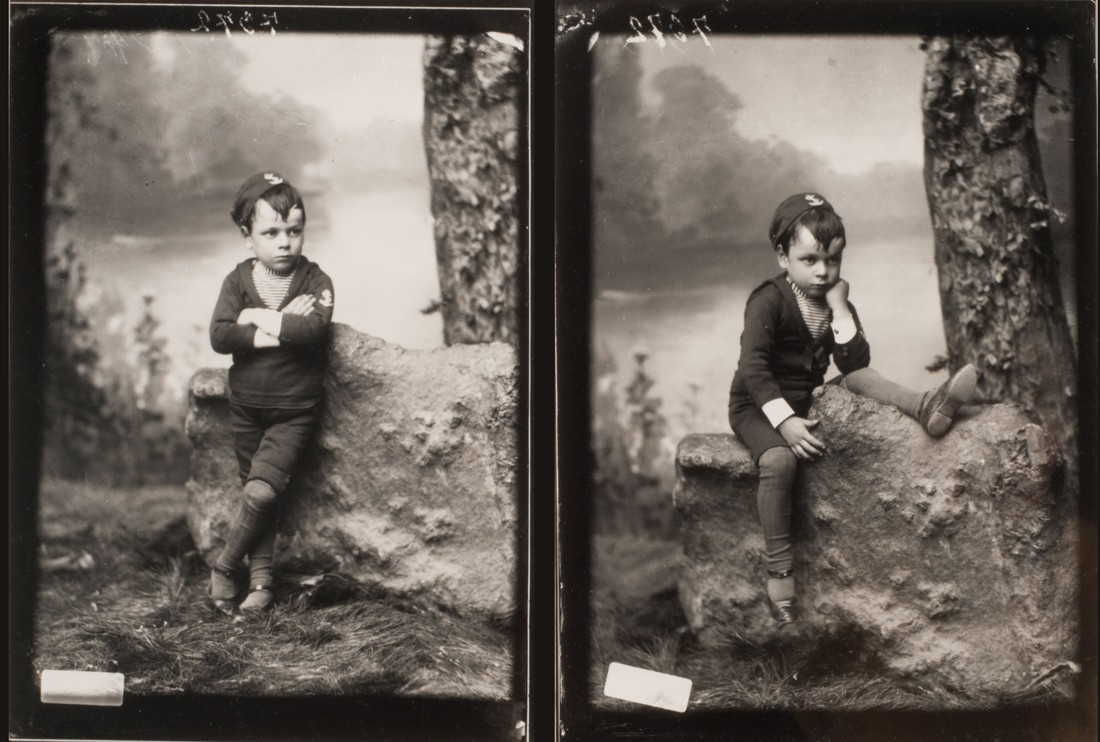
Child in pose

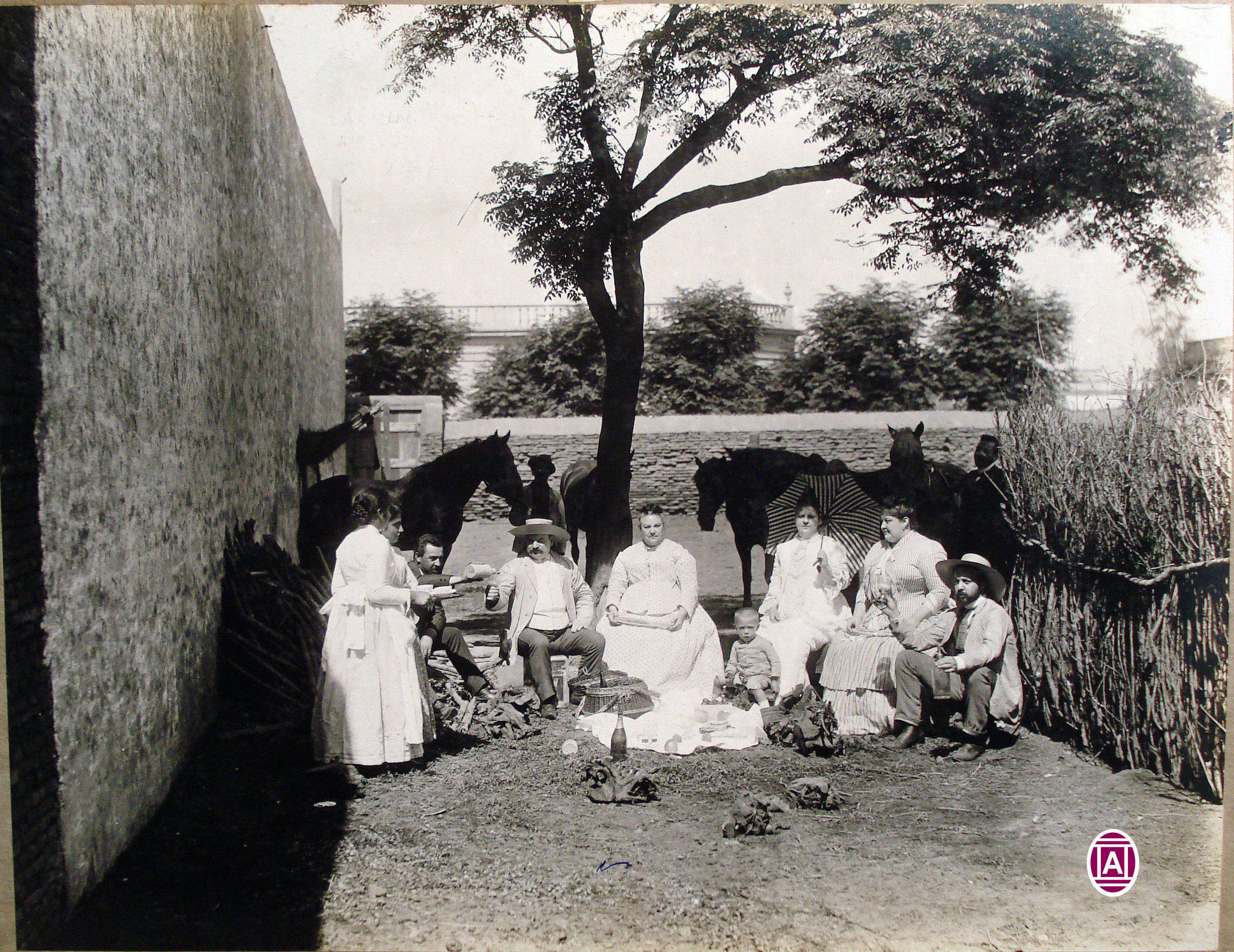
Outdoors lunch

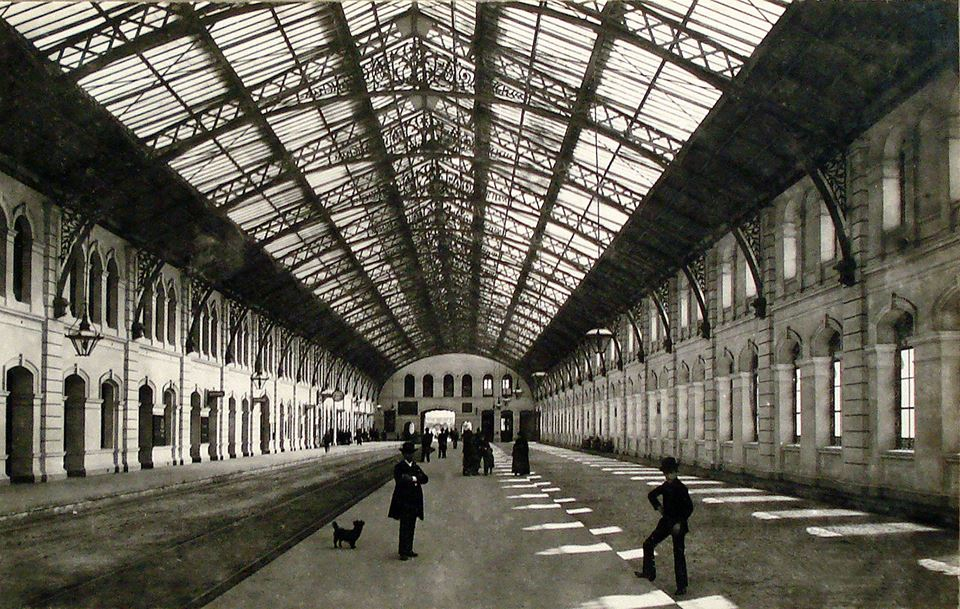
Constitución train station

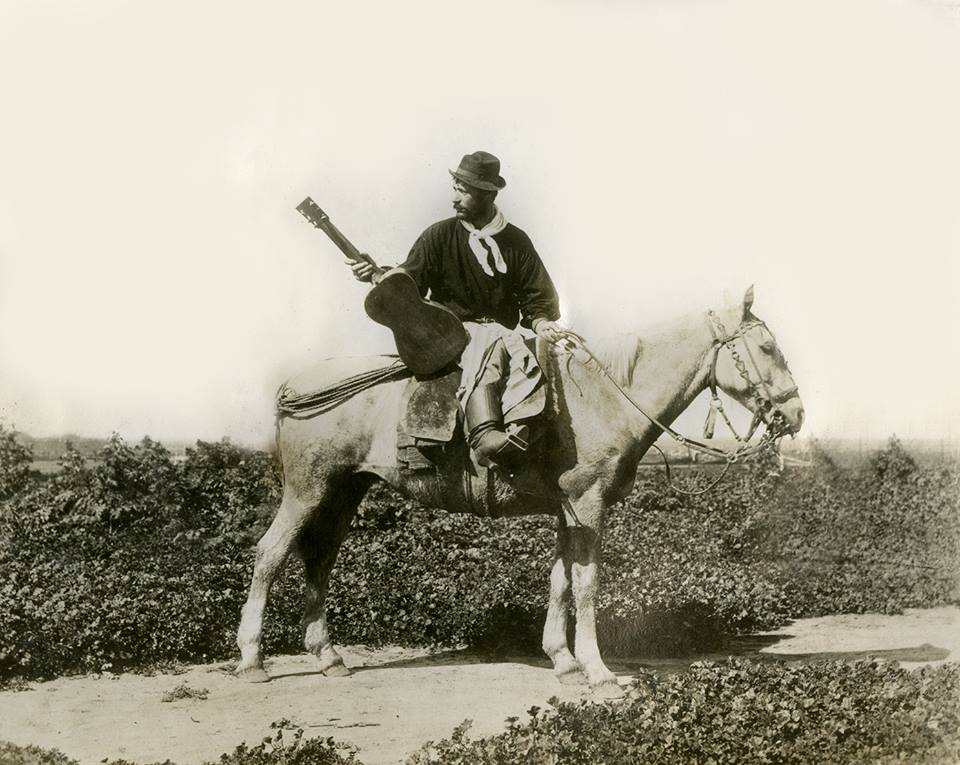
Payador

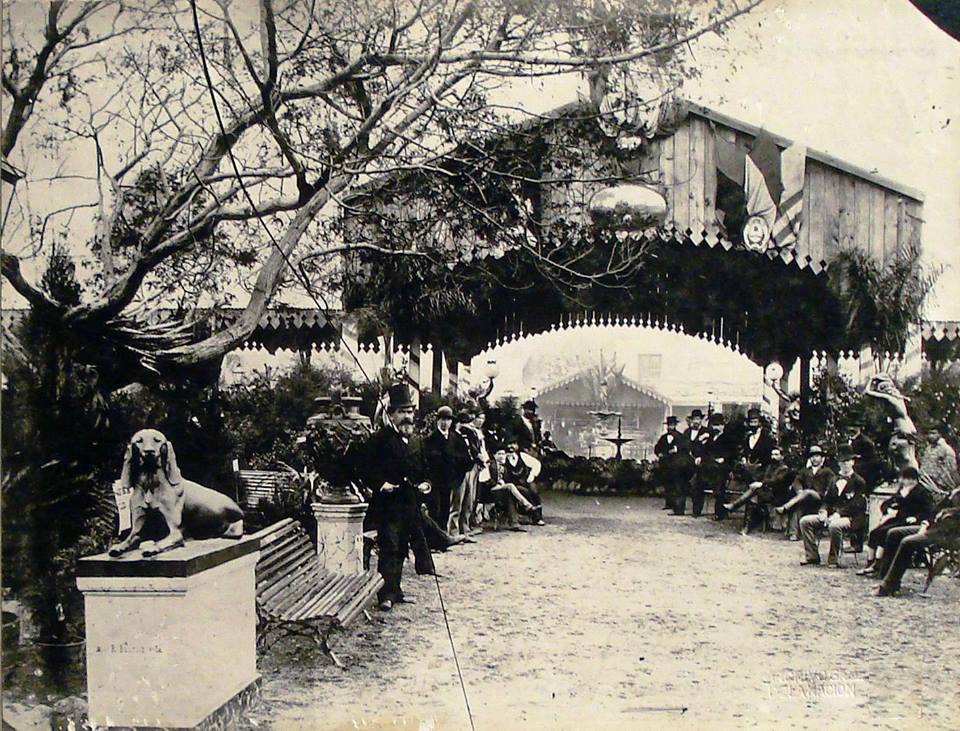
Rural exhibition (1875)

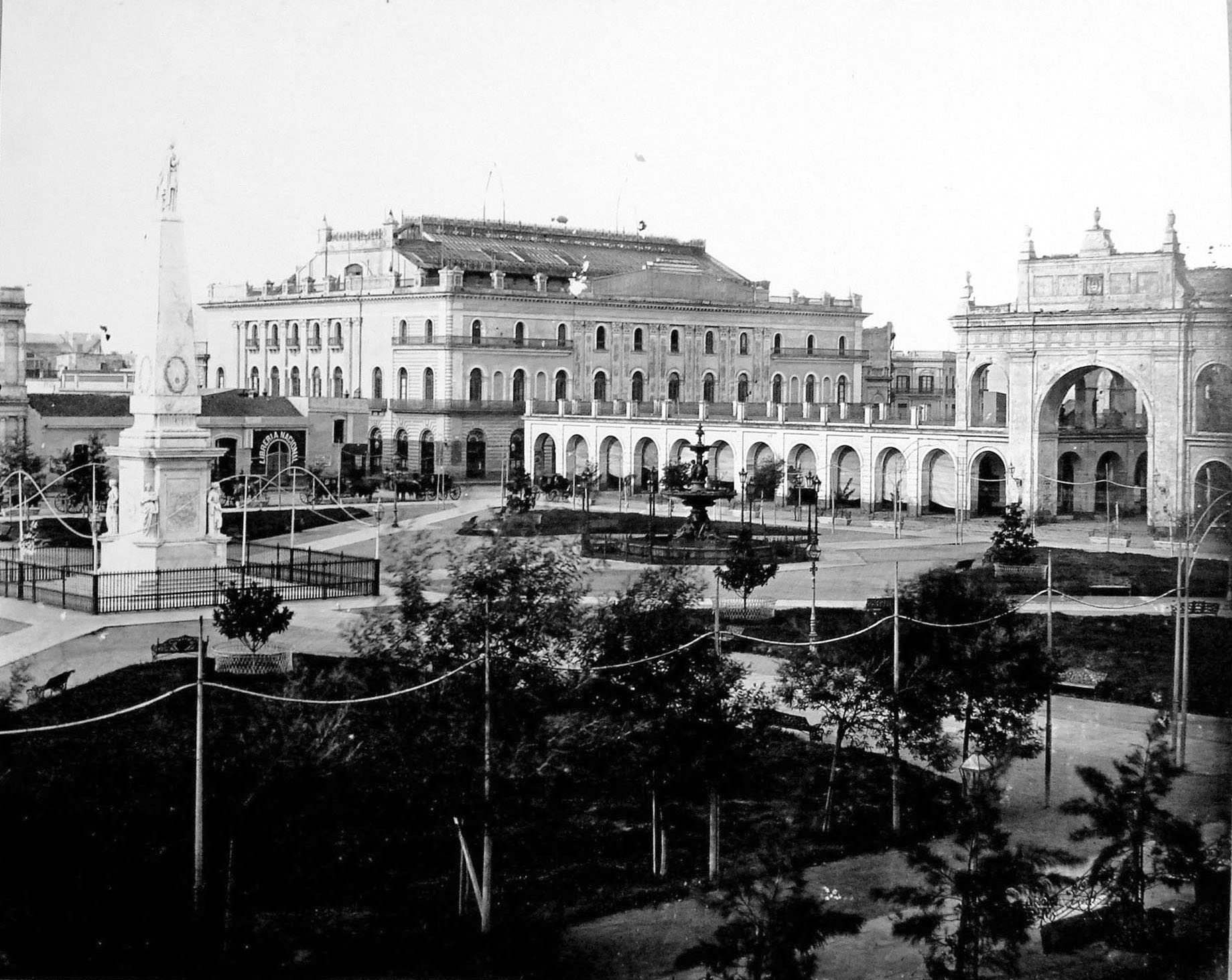
Teatro Colón

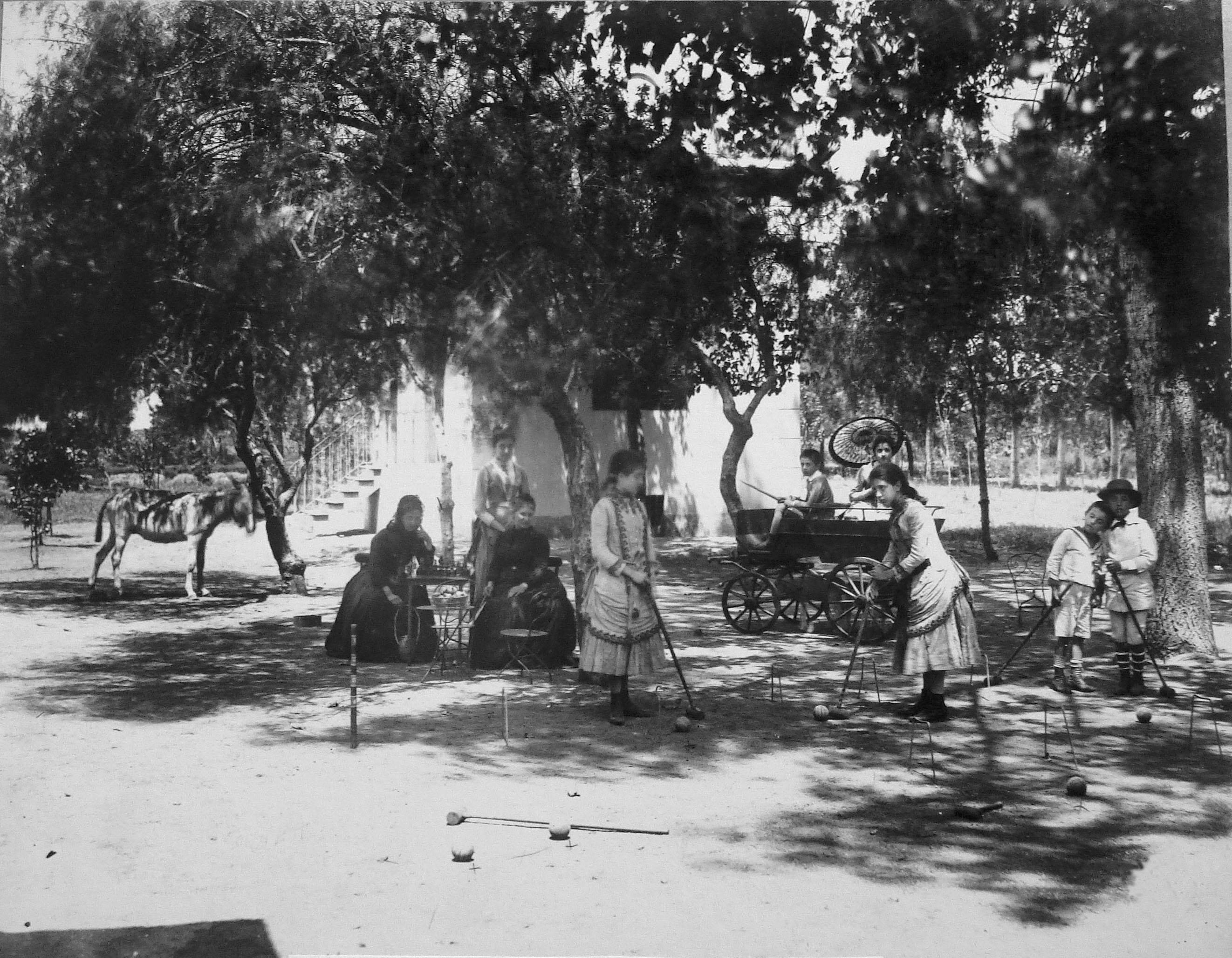
Family playing cricket

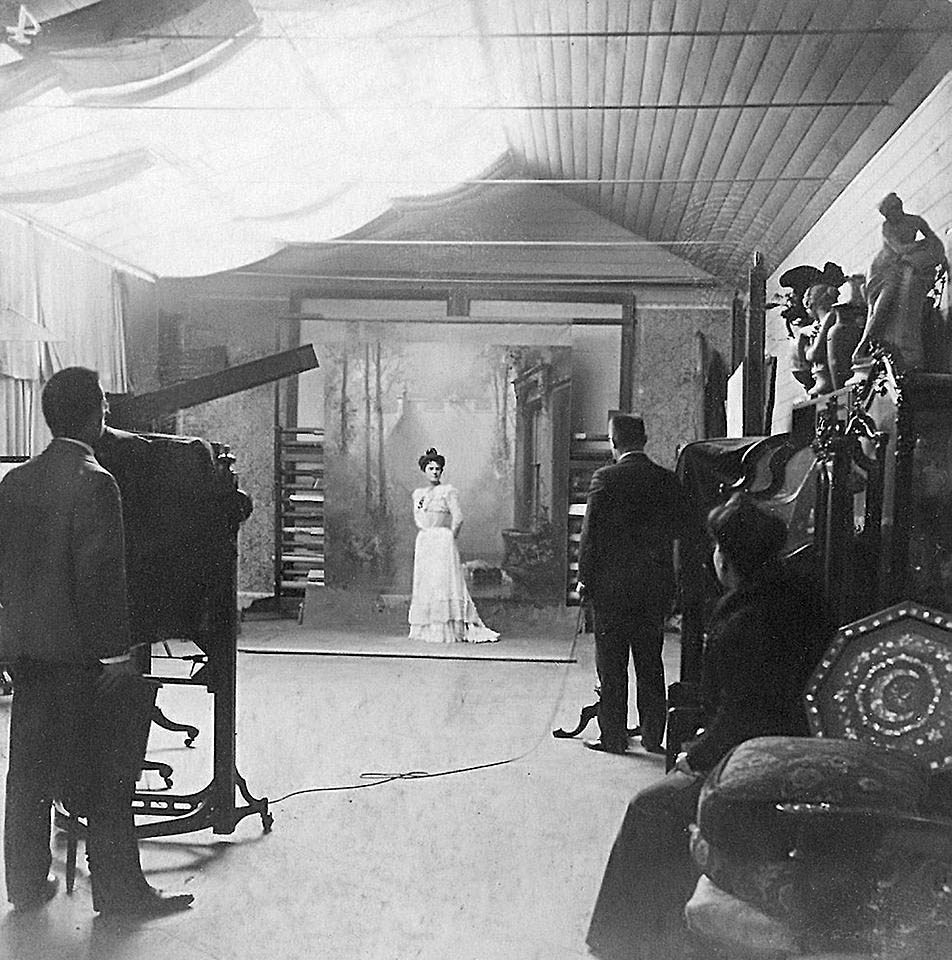
Alexander Witcomb at his studio, c. 1890s.

== Notable art exhibitions ==
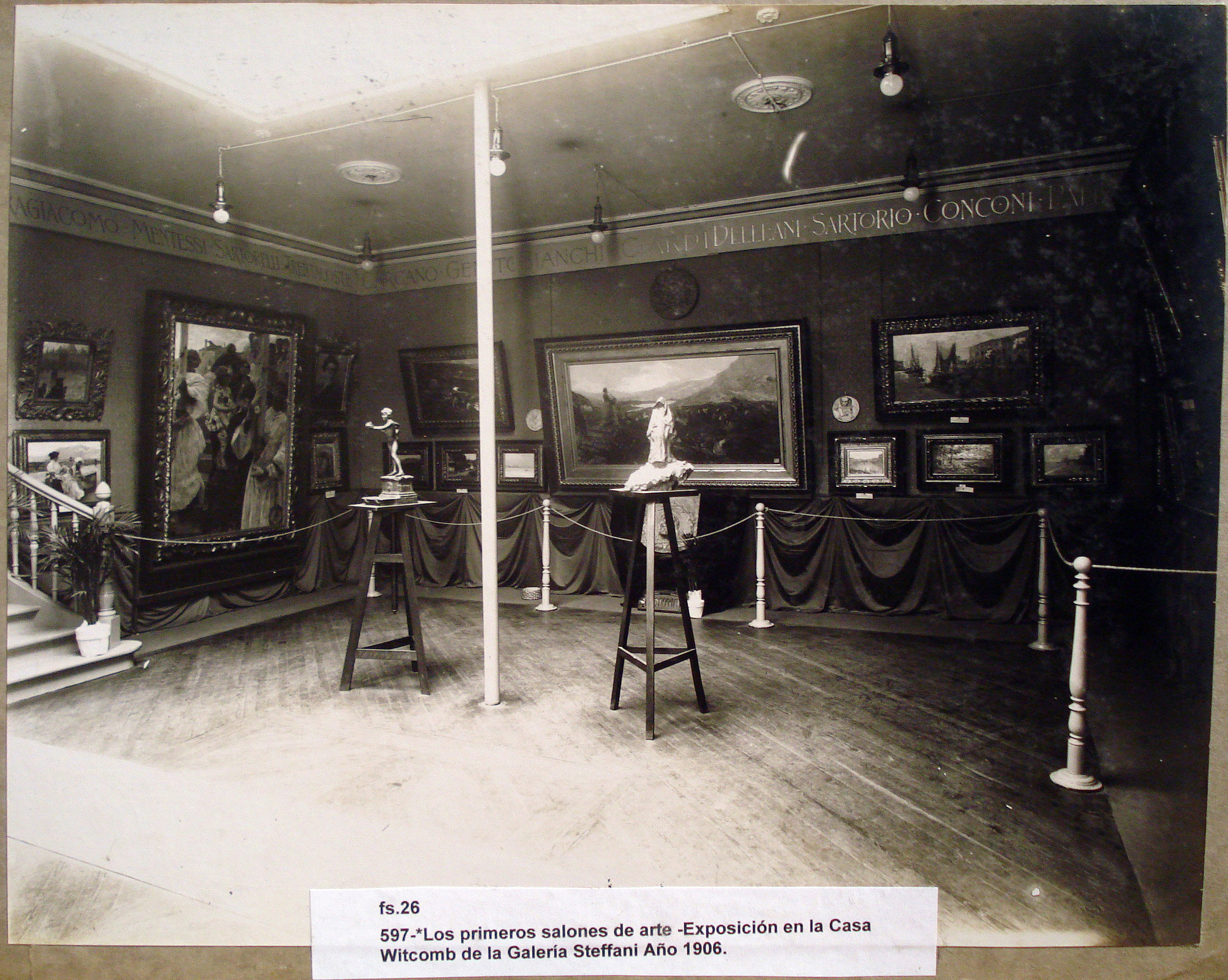
One of the first exhibitions held by the gallery, in 1906

Between 1897 and 1913 Spanish curator José Artal organised modern art expositions of notable artists from his country. Artal designed brochures detailing the pieces to be exhibited, sending them to the media, art collectors and intellectuals.

As during the first years of existence the gallery exhibited European art, in 1902 Martín Mahlharro opened the season with great success. Then president of Argentina Julio A. Roca acquired La Argentina and Joaquín V. González gave his approval to the purchase of En Plena Naturaleza, both by Martín Malharro, for the National Museum of Fine Arts. In 1908 the "Nexus" Group, which include painters such as Carlos P. Ripamonte, Justo Lynch, Pío Collivadino, Alberto Rossi, among others, exhibited 99 works of art with a huge repercussion. Painter Fernando Fader also made exhibitions of his work in 1906, 1907 and 1908.

In 1907 young artist Lia Gismondi was the first woman to make an individual exhibition, followed by other notable artists such as Julia Wernicke, Andree Moch and French painter Leonie Matthis. One year later Martín Malharro made his second individual exhibition, and then in 1911 and 1913.

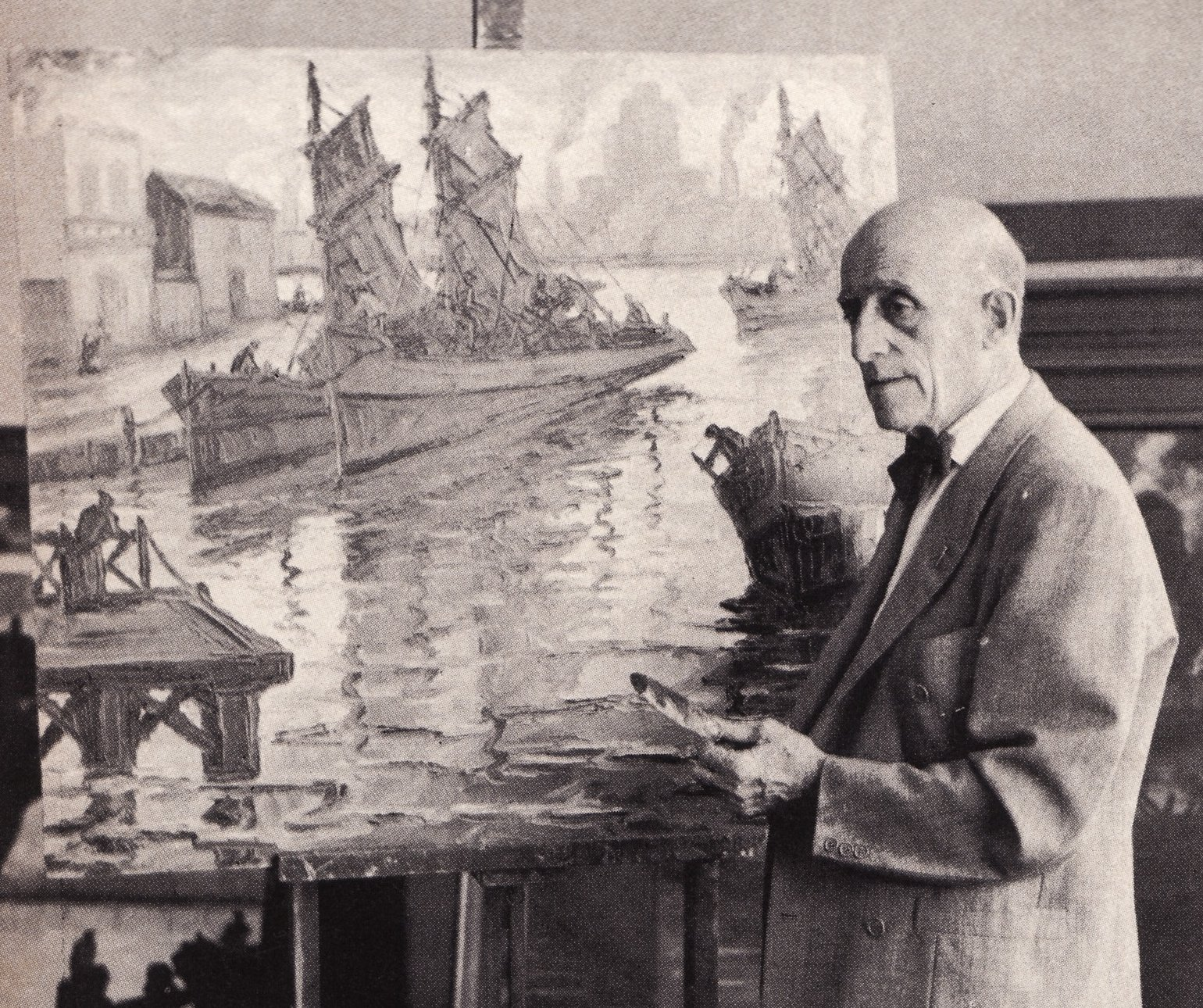
Benito Quinquela Martín was one of the artists that made their first exhibition at Witcomb gallery.

Taking advantage of the good economic situation in Rosario, Santa Fe, Witcomb opened an exhibition room in that city, more specifically in the "Souza" room. Meanwhile, several young Argentine artists had also an opportunity to show their art at the Witcomb gallery in Buenos Aires. Some of them were Victoria Aguirre, Francisco Recondo, Ramón Silva, Fray Guillermo Butler, Raúl Mazza, Faustino Brughetti, Eduardo Schiaffino (who would later be named as director of the National Museum of Fine Arts), amongst others.

In 1918, a young painter named Benito Quinquela Martín exhibited in the gallery for the first time, being acclaimed by both, media and public. The main subject of his paintings was his neighborhood, La Boca, the Isla Maciel and workers at the docks. In Rosario, a 16-year-old painter Antonio Berni exhibited his work in 1921, then repeating in 1922 and 1923. Due to the good results, one year later Berni featured his artwork at Buenos Aires.

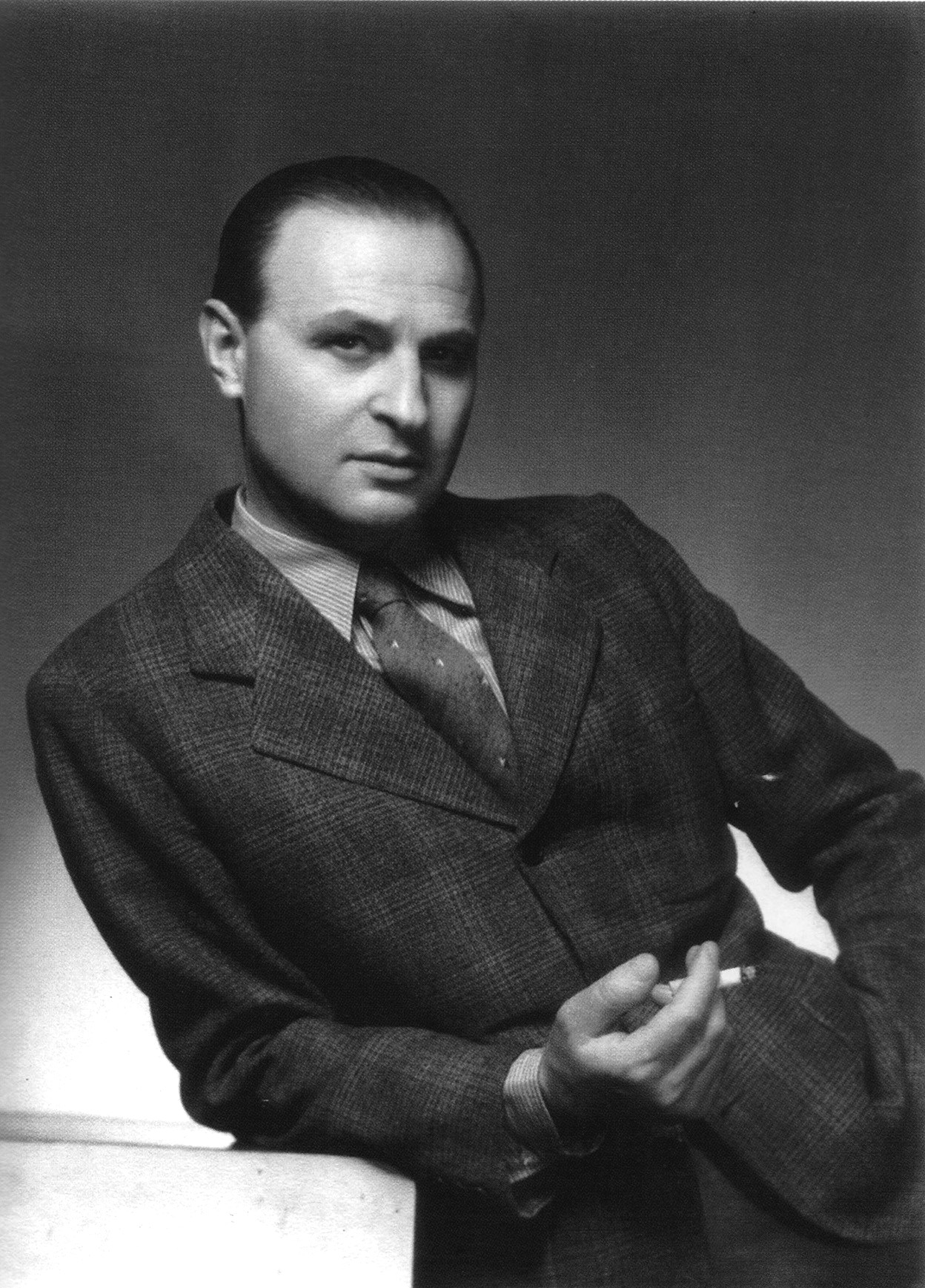
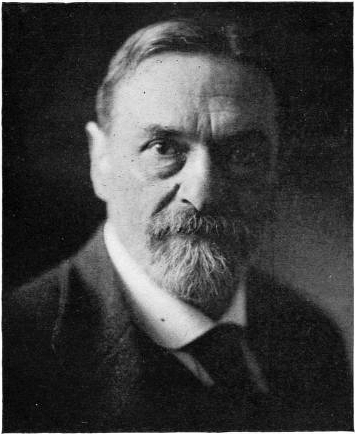
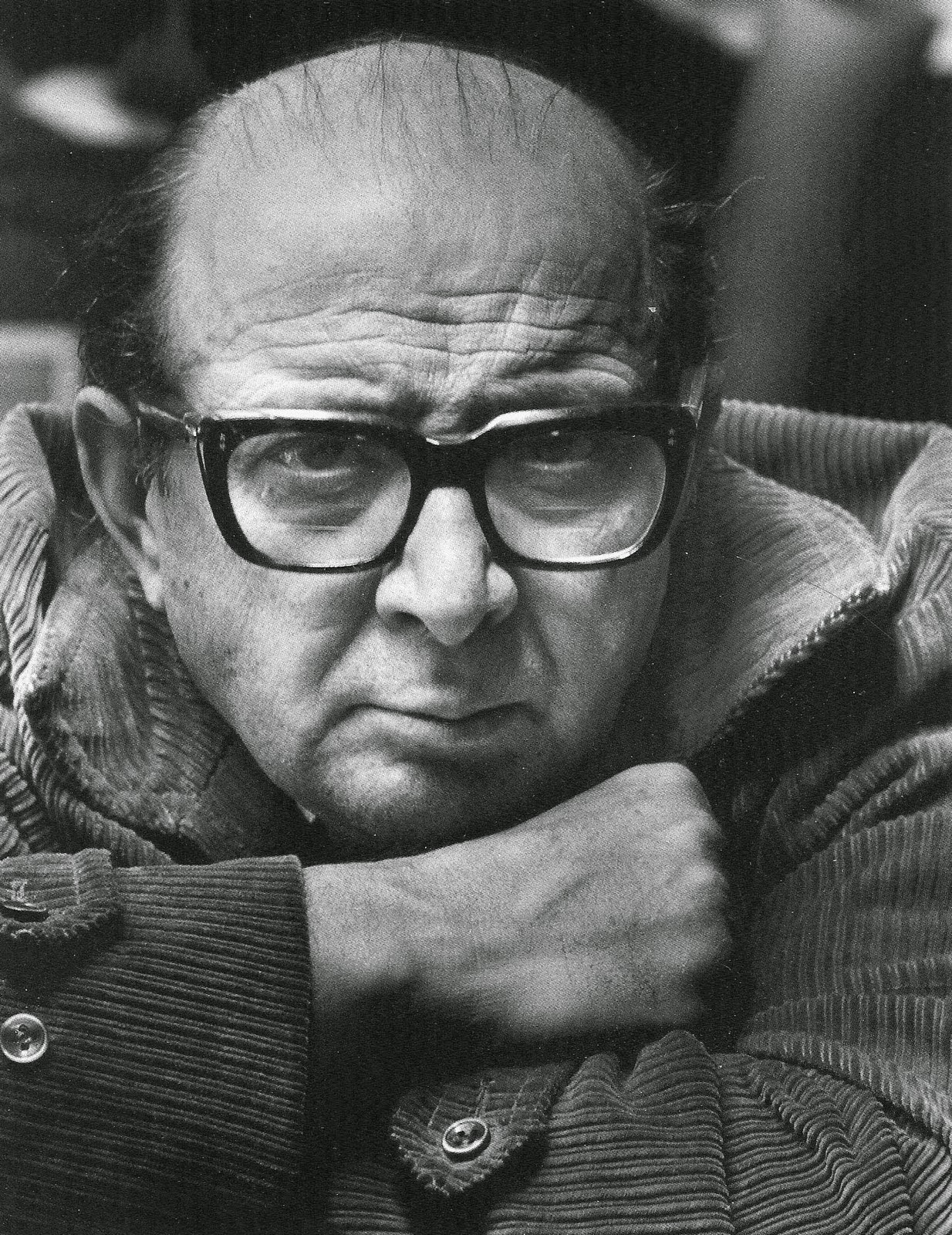
Fltr: Emilio Pettoruti, Pedro Figari, and Antonio Berni, some of the artists that made exhibitions at Witcomb Gallery

During the 1920s there were notable exhibitions such as Emilio Pettoruti, Uruguayan Pedro Figari, Xul Solar, Cesáreo Bernaldo de Quirós, Luis Macaya, Jorge Larco, Víctor Valdivia, Alberto María Rossi, Luis Tessandori and sculptor Rogelio Yrurtia. The 1930 featured the art of Atilio Malinverno, Juan Sol, Tito Gache, Adam Styka, Florencio Molina Campos, Rodolfo Franco, Mario Anganuzzi, Ángel della Valle, Alfredo Lazzari. At the end of the decade (1939) the gallery moved to Florida 760.

In 1947 Antonio Berni returned to the gallery after 20 years of absence. In the 1950s the gallery remained active with a considerable amount of exhibitions by recognised artists and new talents also. Some of the artists that featured their work were Raúl Soldi, Luis Macaya, Enrique Larrañaga, Marcos Tiglio, Florencio Molina Campos, Santiago Cogorno, Ramón Gómez Cornet, Raul Russo, Carlos Alonso, Leopoldo Presas, Jorge Larco, Antonio Berni, Pedro Figari, Ginez Parra, Rómulo Macció, Leopoldo Torres Agüero, and Quinquela Martín. In 1953 the gallery held an exhibition in tribute to Figari that was widely covered by the media.

When new art styles (neo figurative, pop art, happening) came up in the 1960s, Witcomb did not show more enthusiast about them. Nevertheless, the gallery held some exhibitions p.e. Berni's collages (with Juanito Laguna as his main character). Those collages were badly criticized by some critics, but on the other hand, they were well received by other audiences that approved the artist's evolution.

Some of the artists exhibiting during those years were Alberto Bruzzone, Quinquela Martín, Ricardo Sánchez, Batlle Planas, Pettoruti, Luis Centurión, Ramón Gómez Cornet, Cesáreo Quirós, Mario Mollari, César Bustillo. The new generation of artists also had a place to exhibit their art, being Luis Felipe Noe, Antonio Seguí, Juan Grela, Lino Palacio, Vito Campanella, Sakai, Clorindo Testa, Jorge de la Vega, Rogelio Polesello among them. In 1968 the gallery celebrated its 100th. anniversary with multiple activities.

In 1970 the gallery held 88 exhibitions (duplicating 1969) but it had to close in 1971 due to the excessive increase of the rent and the refurbishment of Florida streets that became it a pedestrian street.

=== Art gallery ===
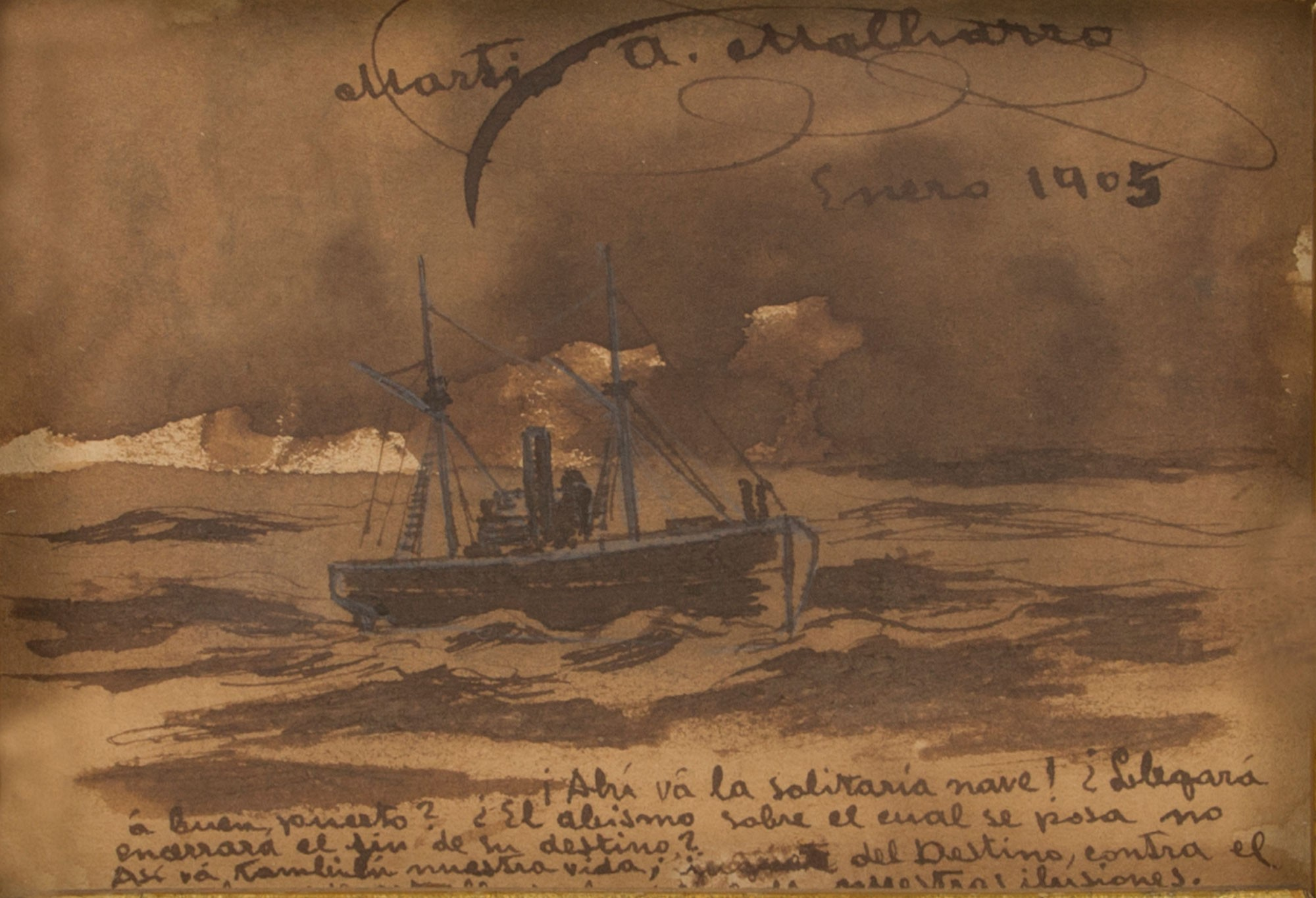
La Argentina (Martín Malharro)

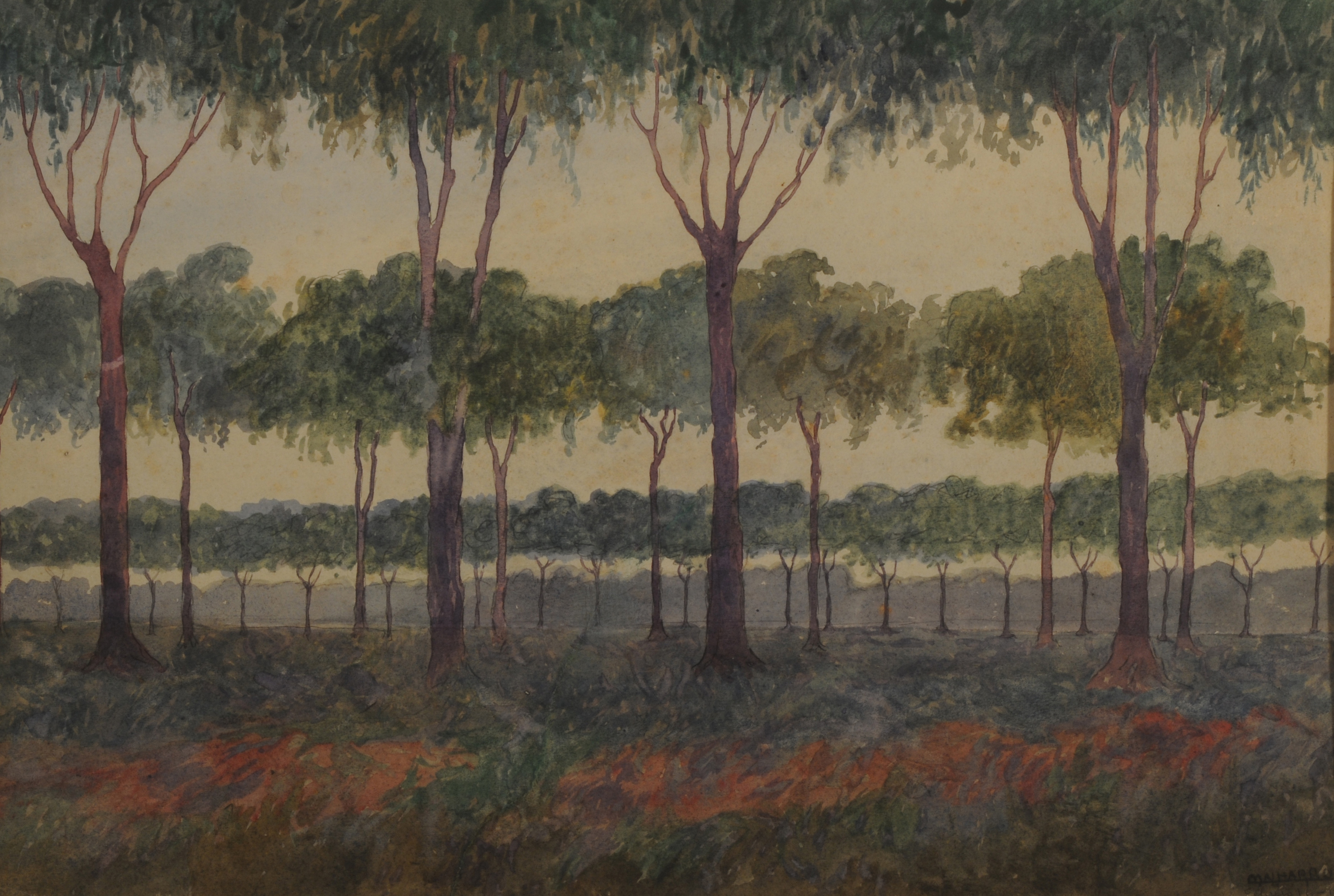
La Arboleda (Malharro)

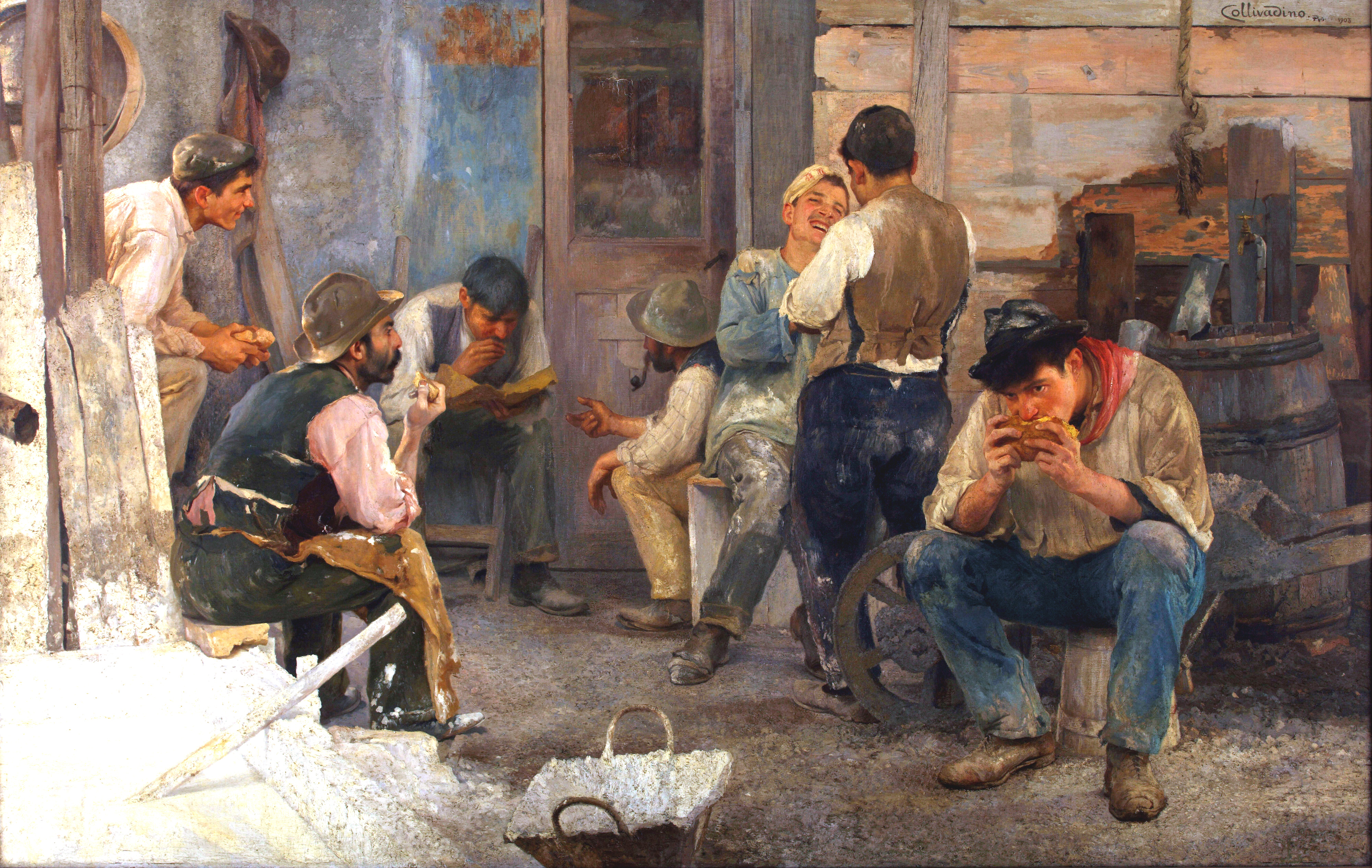
Lunchtime (Pio Collivadino)

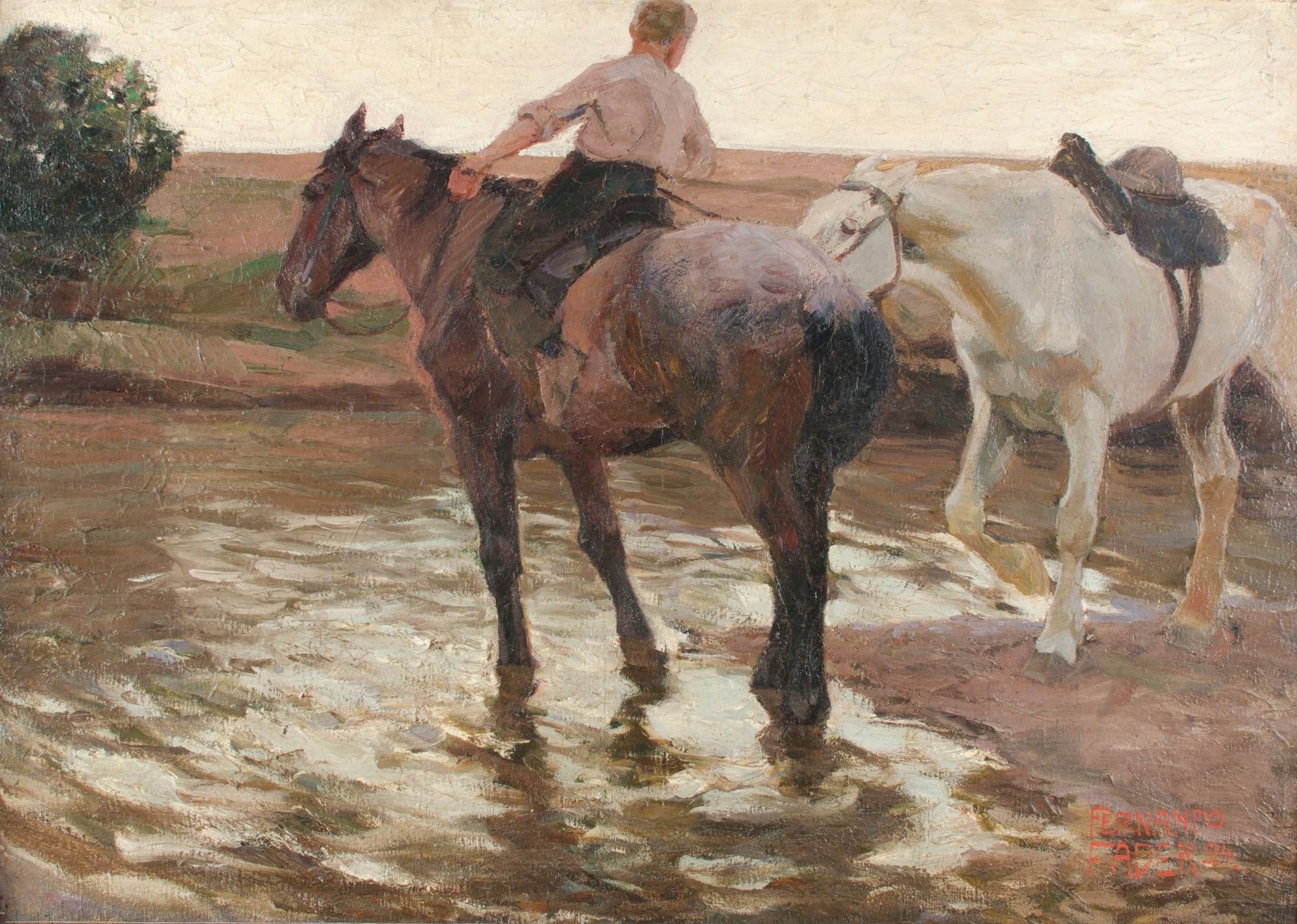
Horses (Fernando Fader)

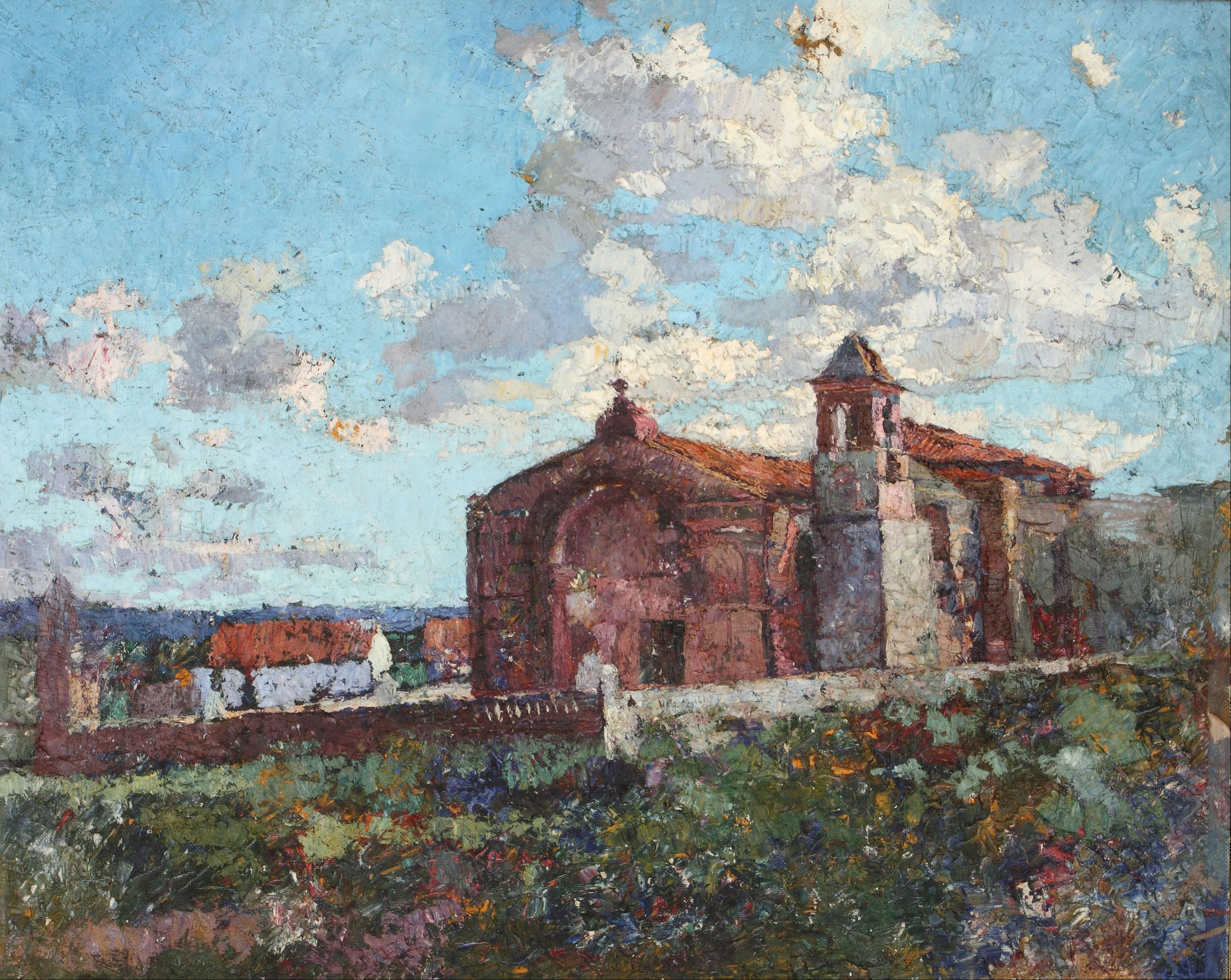
Capilla de Ischillín (Fader)

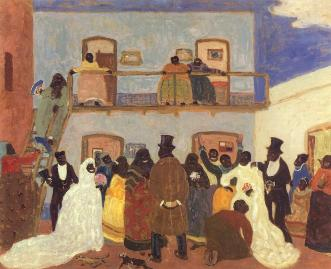
Double Wedding (Pedro Figari)

== See also ==
- General Archive of the Nation (Argentina)
- Christiano Junior
