= Mazo =

Mazo may refer to:

== Places ==
- Mazo Beach, Wisconsin, USA
  - Mazomanie, Wisconsin, referred to as Mazo & where the beach is located
- Robledo del Mazo, Castile-La Mancha, Spain
- Villa de Mazo, La Palma, Spain

== People ==
- Mazo (surname)
- Mazo de la Roche (1879–1961), Canadian writer

== See also ==
- Mazzo (disambiguation)
