= Mazzo =

Mazzo may refer to:

- Mazzo di Valtellina, Italian commune in Piedmont
- Mazzo (surname), Italian surname

== See also ==
- Mazza (disambiguation)
- Mazo (disambiguation)
