= General Archive of the Nation (Argentina) =

National archives of Argentina

Coordinates: 34°36′17″S 58°22′14″W

- Archivo General de la Nación
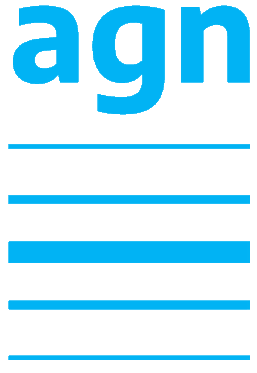

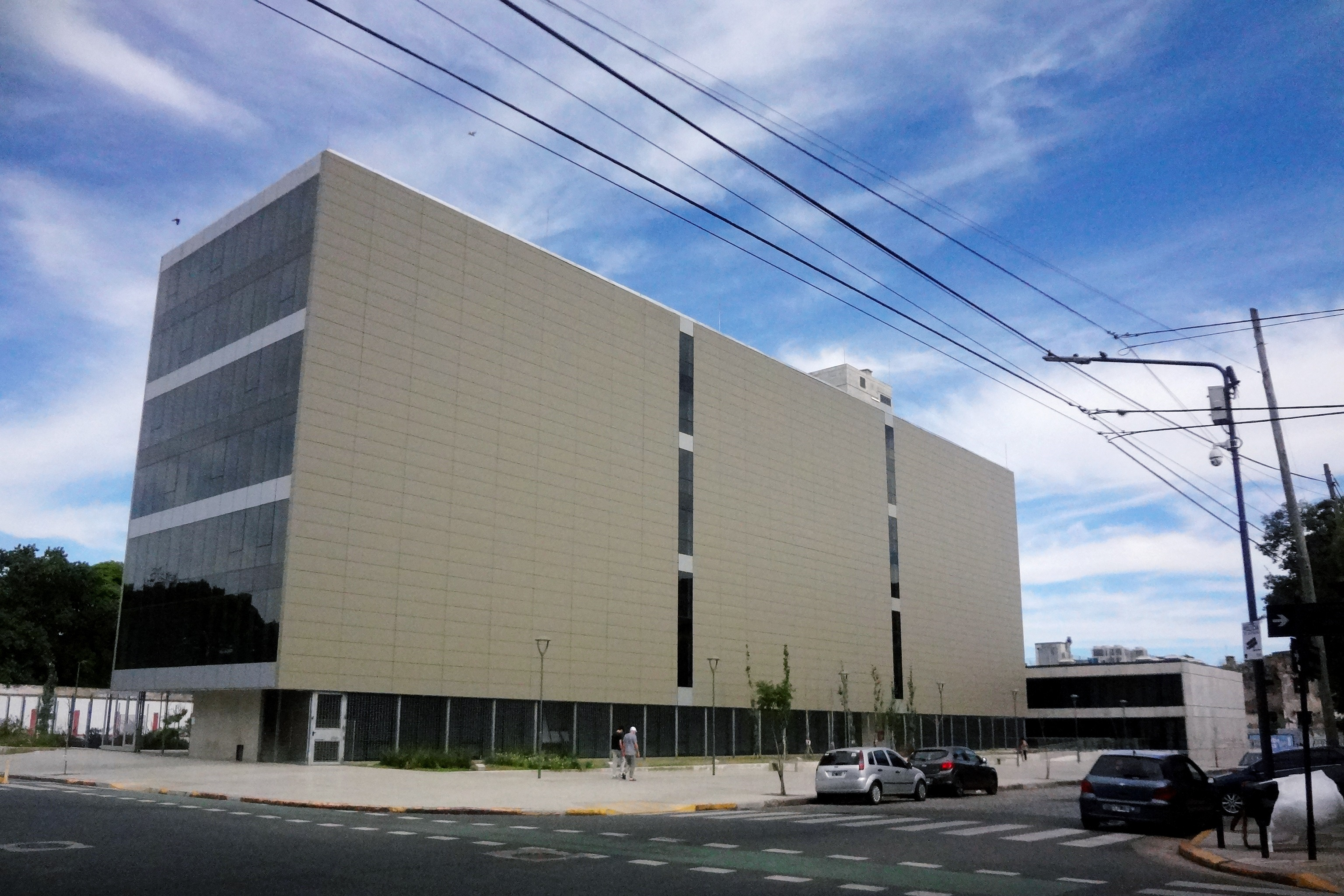
- Headquarters of the AGN in Buenos Aires

Agency overview
- Formed: August 21, 1821; 205 years ago as "Archivo de la Provincia de Buenos Aires"
- Preceding agency: Archivo Gráfico de la Nación
- Type: Archive
- Jurisdiction: Argentina
- Headquarters: Rondeau 2277 Buenos Aires
- Agency executive: Emilio Konstantinovsky, General Director
- Parent agency: Secretariat of the Interior
- Website: argentina.gob.ar/agn

The General Archive of the Nation (Spanish: Archivo General de la Nación, AGN) are the national archives of Argentina. It is a body under the Secretariat of the Interior, which aims to collect, order and keep the documentation that the law entrusts to it, to spread knowledge of the sources of Argentine history.

== Overview ==
The archives were established on August 28, 1821, by Governor Martín Rodríguez as the "Buenos Aires Province Archive". In 1884 the archive's jurisdiction expanded to the entire country, being renamed "Archivo General de la Nación".

The institution absorbed numerous historical archives, libraries, and other collections over the subsequent decades, and in 1957 acquired the National Print Archive, a bureau established in 1939. Its collections occupy around 14 km (9 mi) of shelf stacks, and the AGN is a member of the Memory of the World Programme, a UNESCO initiative.

Operated by the Ministry of Internal Affairs, the AGN is organized into five departments:

- Written Documents. This section curates parchments and manuscripts originating in the colonial Viceroyalty of Peru and Viceroyalty of Río de la Plata, as well as those dating from the May Revolution of 1810, and of the series of fledgling governments assembled during the Argentine War of Independence.
- Photographic Documents. Photographs dating from 1853 to 1983, totalling over 800,000, as well as the Witcomb Collection (images taken in the renowned former art gallery of its many exhibitions).
- Library and Dissemination. Oversees partnerships with archives and kindred institutions from around the world, serves as liaison to journalists and researchers, publishes all archive newsletters and periodicals, and maintains the sum of the institute's bibliography (over 100,000 books). This department, in turn, includes:
  - Bibliography Fund. 80,000 volumes, and a periodicals library of over 1,500 titles.
  - Ernesto Celesia Collection.13,000 volumes dating from the 19th century, and from several countries in South America.
  - José Juan Biedma Collection. 717 period publications regarding the Paraguayan War and boundary disputes with Chile.
  - José A. Pillado Collection. 1,044 tomes on Argentine and Western Hemisphere history.
  - Juan Domingo Perón Collection. 4,000 volumes donated by the populist leader from his personal library.
  - Periodicals Library. Magazine and newspaper issues from the 19th and 20th centuries.
- Cinema and Media. Over 3,000 films, newsreels, Ampex tapes, and more recent multimedia items.
- Intermediate Archive. Established in 1979, the library science arm of the AGN assists archives and libraries nationwide and elsewhere with the classification and curation of items. This office also maintains the bulk of documentation produced by the array of State enterprises, and was entrusted with these during President Carlos Menem's privatizations drive.

== Seats ==
Housed within the former Congress building in 1906, the AGN was relocated to its present address at 246 Leandro Alem Avenue (a former National Mortgage Bank office designed by Arturo Prins, and completed in 1920), upon the inaugural of the new Mortgage Bank building in 1950.

The headquarters cannot house the entirety of its vast collections, which include over 17 kilometres (11 mi) of shelves of documentation; the Intermediate Archive, for instance, was opened in another, nearby building. Plans were announced for the archives' transfer to the former ALEA Building, a Rationalist structure located behind the Alas Building that was ultimately sold to developer IRSA in 1998. Construction was approved in 2012 for a new main building for the AGN, designed by Fabio Estremera, Luciana Deschamps and Javier Gavernet, and to be located on the site of the former Caseros Prison in the Parque Patricios district.
