= Santiago José García Mazo =

Spanish rhetorician, pedagogue and writer

Santiago José García Mazo (1768–1849) was a Spanish priest, rhetorician, pedagogue and writer.

== Works ==
- Sermons preached... and rhetorical preamble notes, 1847.
- To read the Christian story from childhood to old age, that is, Compendium of the history of religion out of the holy books, 1843.
- The catechism of Christian doctrine explained ..., Valladolid, 1837.
- Daily piety brief or spiritual rules.
