= Raúl Mazza =

Argentine painter

Raúl Mazza (6 June 1888 in Buenos Aires – 24 February 1948 in Buenos Aires) was an Argentine painter.

== Works ==
- Still Life with Fruit (1927)
- The Harvest (1938).
