= Mazzi =

Mazzi is an Italian surname. Notable people with the surname include:

- Alessandro Mazzi (born 1987), Italian racing cyclist
- Gianmarco Mazzi (born 1960), Italian politician
- Giampiero Mazzi (born 1974), Italian rugby union player and coach
- Marco Mazzi (born 1980), Italian writer, filmmaker, art critic and photographer
- Sylvio Hoffmann Mazzi (1908–1991), Brazilian football player
- Tamara Mazzi (born 1992), German politician
