= Evita Fine Arts Museum =

Coordinates: 31°25′36″S 64°11′05″W

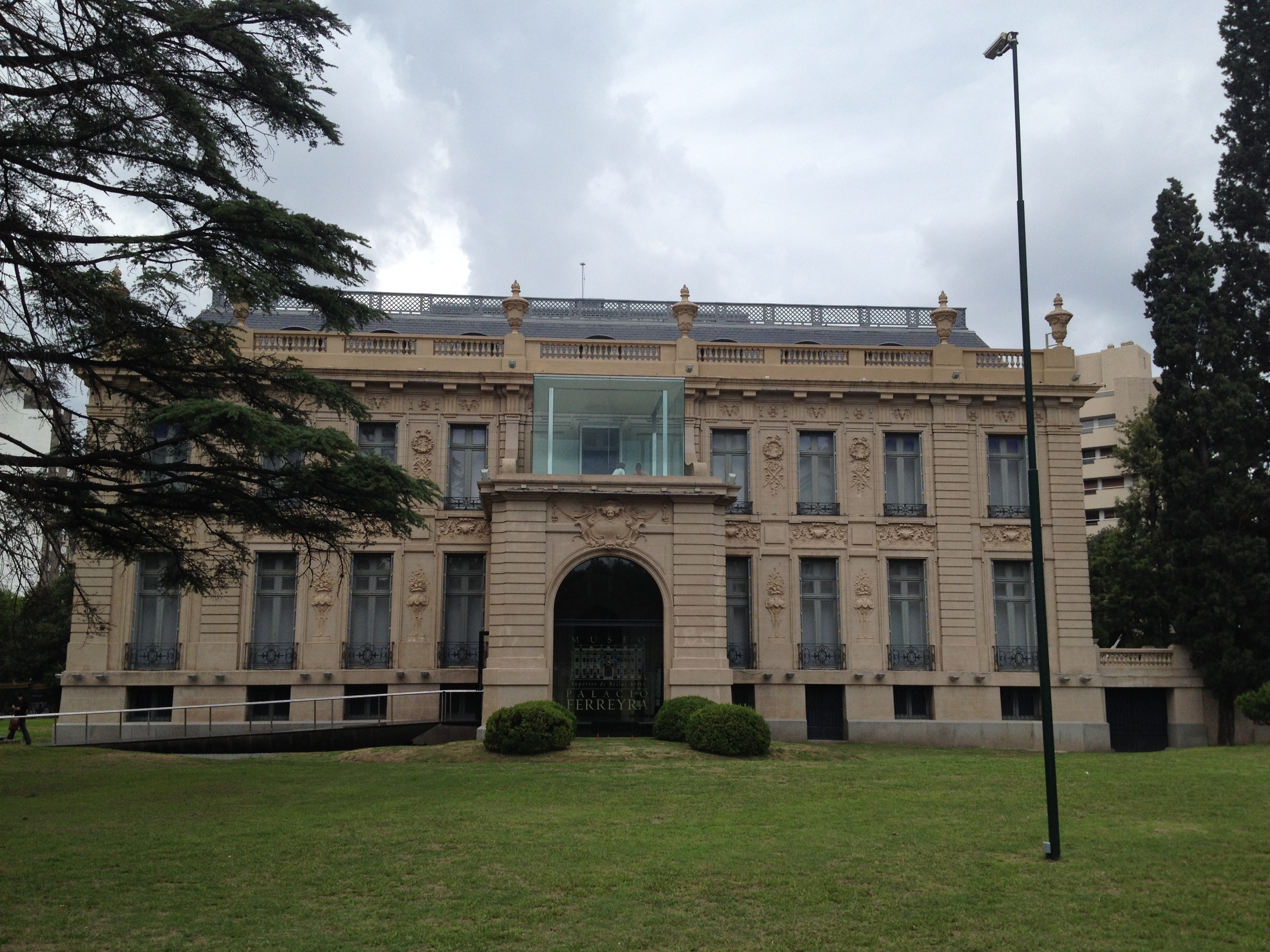
The Ferreyra Palace, site of the museum.

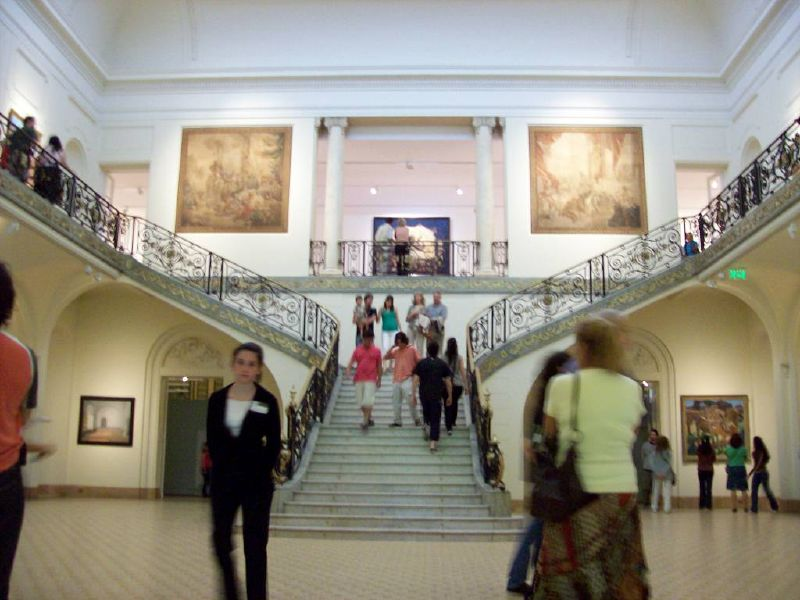
Central exhibit hall

The Evita Fine Arts Museum (Museo Superior de Bellas Artes Evita) is an art museum in Córdoba, Argentina.

== Overview ==
The museum is housed in the Ferreyra Palace, a Beaux-Arts mansion designed by French architect Ernest Sanson and built between 1912 and 1916 for Dr. Martín Ferreyra, a prominent local physician and surgeon, as well the owner of limestone quarries and the then-biggest lime factory in Argentina (located at Malagueño, 15 miles to the west of Córdoba).

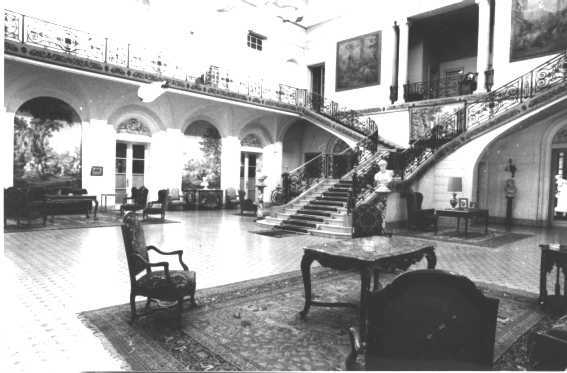
Central hall when the Palace was a family household

Ferreyra chose the location as a result of the development of the adjacent Sarmiento Park, a 17 hectare (43 acre) space created along what was then Córdoba's eastern edge (New Córdoba) and inaugurated in 1911. Subsequent generations added to the palace's interiors, notably the Imperial Bedroom (Dormitorio Imperio), so named because the furniture was copied by famed cabinetmaker Krieger of Paris, from those used by Napoleon Bonaparte.

The mansion was expropriated by the Córdoba Governor José Manuel de la Sota in 2005. Following a complicated refurbishment process, the "Ferreyra Palace Fine Arts Museum" opened its doors on October 17, 2007; political considerations led to the institution's redesignation that December as the Evita Fine Arts Museum, in homage to the influential former Argentine First Lady, Evita Perón.

The museum maintains 12 exhibit halls, library, and an auditorium for 120. Its collection of over 500 works includes those by Emilio Caraffa, Juan Carlos Castagnino, Gustave Courbet, Fernando Fader, Francisco Goya, Emilio Pettoruti, Pablo Picasso, Joaquín Sorolla, Lino Enea Spilimbergo and Ricardo Supisiche, among others. The museum hosts ongoing temporary exhibits, as well.
