= Caraffa Fine Arts Museum =

Coordinates: 31°25′42″S 64°11′02″W

The Caraffa Museum
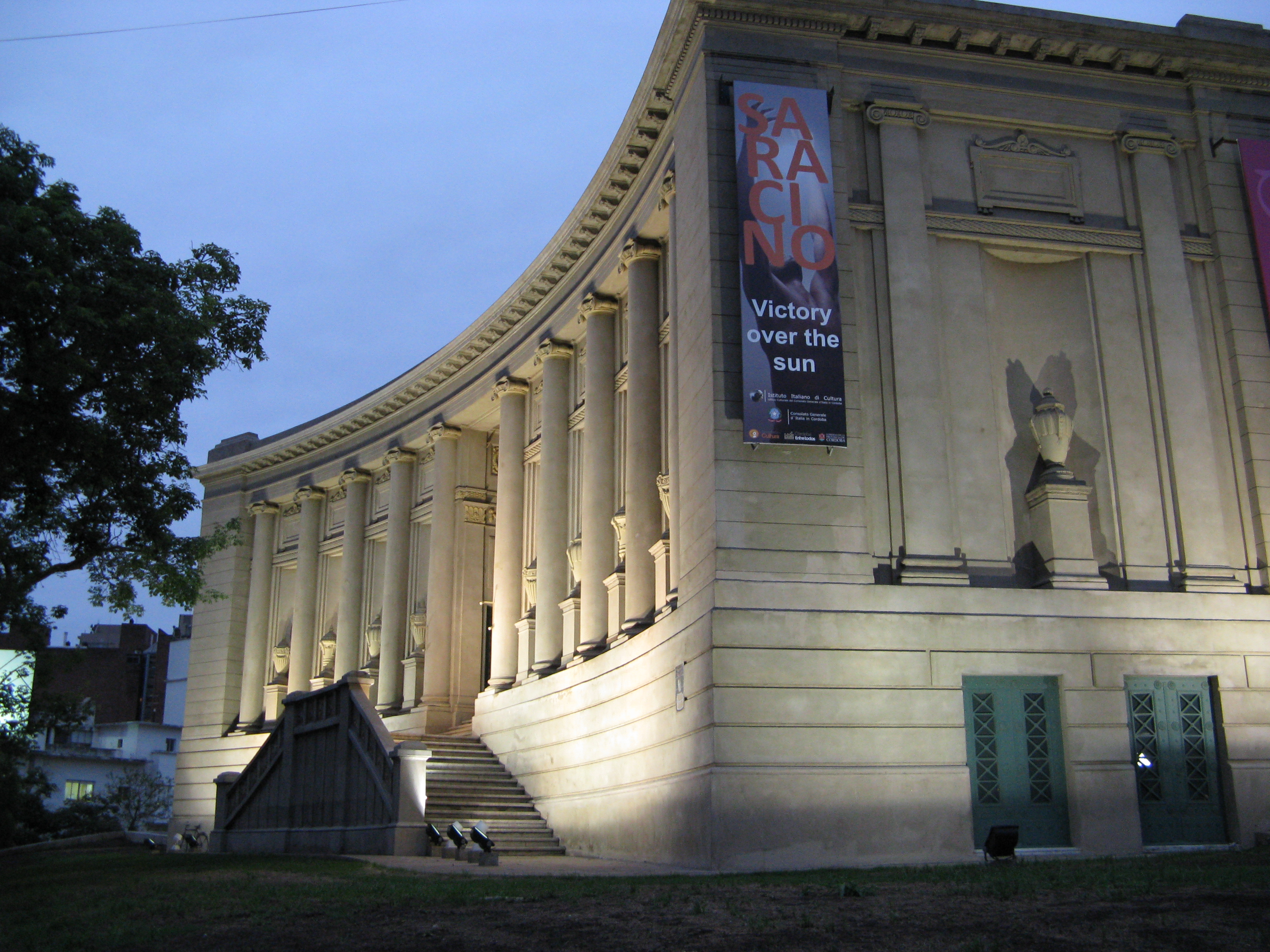
- Interactive map of the The Caraffa Museum area

General information
- Type: Museum
- Location: Cordoba, Argentina

Design and construction
- Architect: Juan Kronfuss James Corner

The Emilio Caraffa Provincial Fine Arts Museum is an art museum in Córdoba, Argentina.

== Overview ==
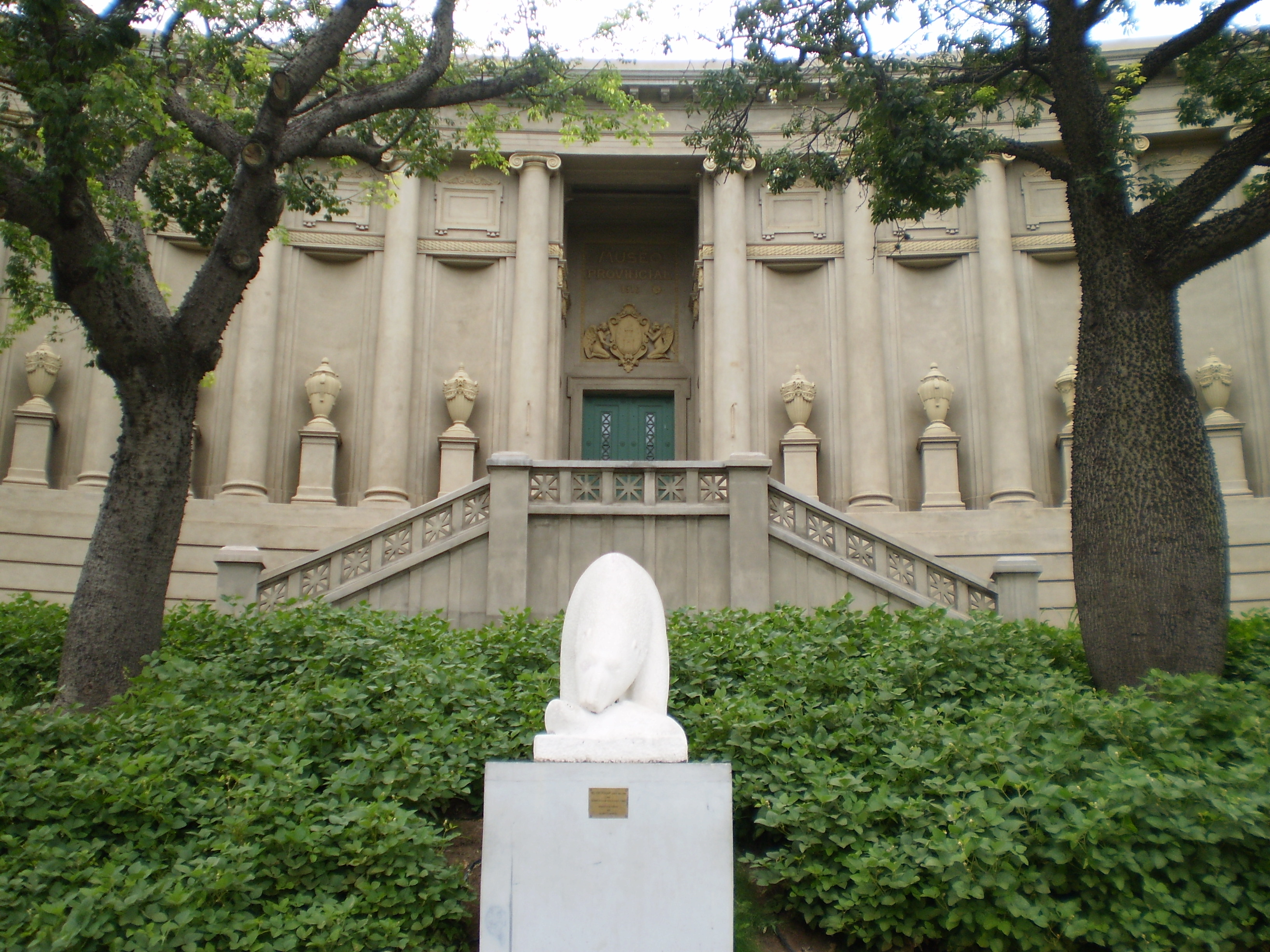
Museo Caraffa front view

The institution was established as the Provincial Fine Arts Museum by the Province of Córdoba. In 1915, the museum's design was commissioned to German Argentine architect Juan Kronfuss. Built on the western edge of the newly inaugurated Sarmiento Park, the work of Neoclassical architecture was completed in 1916, and originally included 255 m^{2} (2,700 ft²) and one exhibit hall, the Kronfuss Salon. The Provincial Museum was renamed in honor of local artist Emilio Caraffa, in 1950, and new wings completed in 1962 and 2007 brought the museum's display area to 1,500 m^{2} (17,000 ft²), distributed among nine exhibit halls.

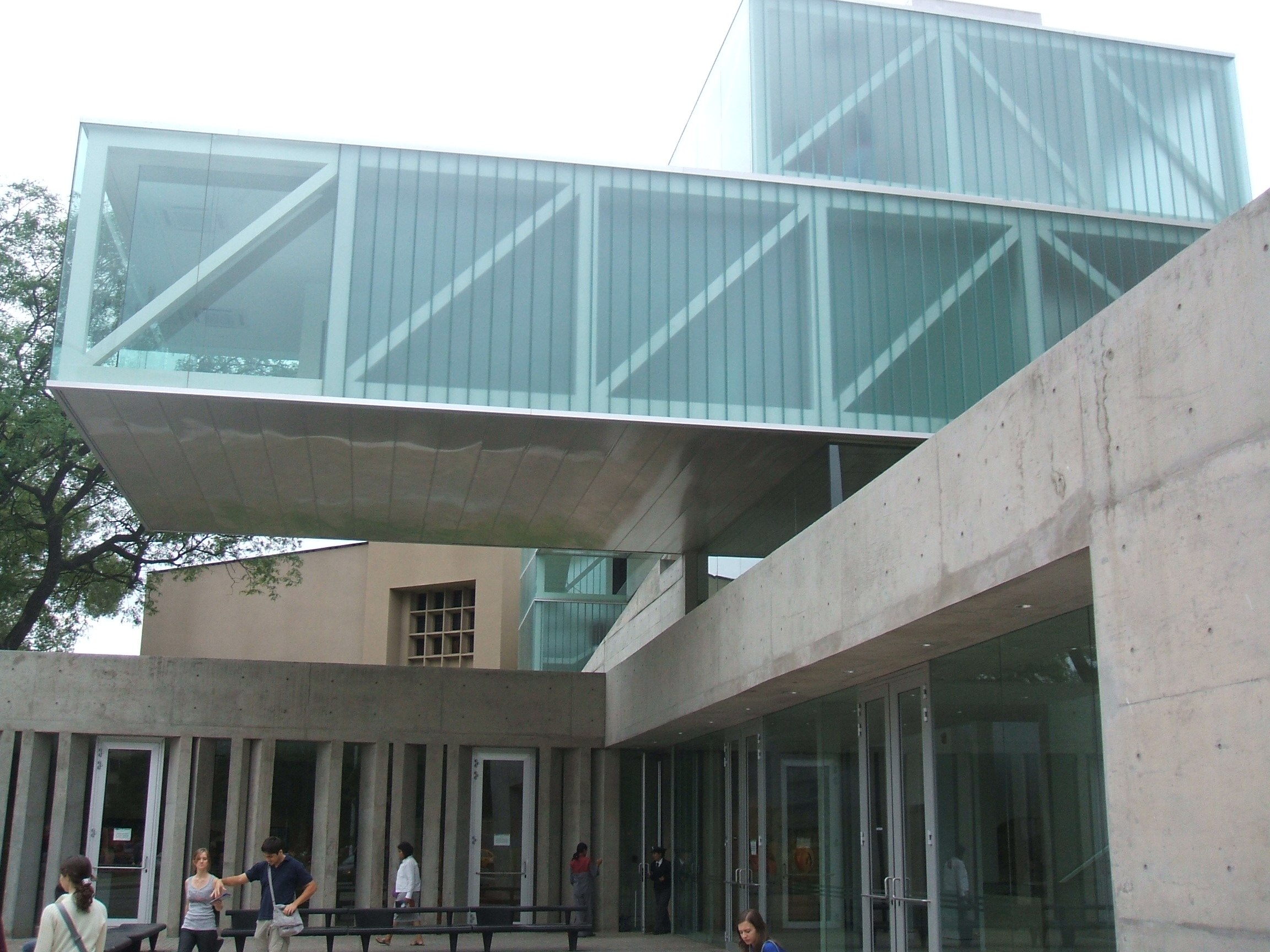
Entrance to new wing

Aside from its permanent collection, the museum maintains paintings and sculptures by other renowned local artists such as Juan Carlos Castagnino, Pablo Curatella Manes, Fernando Fader, Emilio Pettoruti, Lino Enea Spilimbergo, as well as lithographs by Pablo Picasso and paintings by Tsuguharu Foujita and Francisco Goya. The museum also hosts temporary exhibits and includes the provincial art archive and restoration workshop, as well as a library and educational facilities.

== History of the museum (period 1887-2010) ==
- 1887: Creation of the Museo Politécnico de la Provincia. Jerónimo Lavagna suggests to the government minister Ramón J. Cárcano to create a public museum. In 1887 the Museo Politécnico (also called Museo Provincial) is created by decree.
- 1910: Acquisition of a landscape painting by Santiago Rusiñol. The government resolution states: ‘Being of evident convenience to initiate the gradual formation of a gallery of pictorial art, with the aim of promoting the fine arts, it is resolved to acquire the work of the painter Santiago Rusiñol to be kept for the time being in the government's office'.
- 1911: Reorganization of the Museo Provincial and creation of a Fine Arts section. Jacobo Wolff promotes a project of reorganization of the museum, which is formalized by a decree of the governor Félix Garzón Maceda. The creation of a painting and sculpture gallery was entrusted to Wolff and to Emilio Caraffa, who at the time was the director of the Provincial Academy of Fine Arts.
- 1912: Development of the Fine Arts section: guidelines for acquiring pieces for the Fine Arts section are established: ‘to form an illustrative element of the universal development of the fine arts, its evolution and different schools, as well as to record the beginnings of its teachings in Cordoba and the progressive results of those teachings’.
- 1914: Inauguration of the Painting Rooms of the Museo Provincial. It takes place the 5th of December and there are more than 160 works on display, distributed in 6 rooms.
- 1916: Completion of the Museo Provincial building. The construction of the building of the Museo Provincial begins between 1915 and 1916 (Ramón J. Cárcano´s administration concludes).
- 1917: Project for the reorganisation of the museum. Roca creates a document in which he sets out guidelines for reorganising the institution. He proposes the creation of two new institutions: a Colonial Museum and a Natural History Museum. He then points out that the Museo Provincial will be a museum of modern art as time goes by. Pablo Cabrera (1919-1922): Monsignor Pablo Cabrera becomes the director of the museum.
- 1922: The Fine Arts section of the Museo Provincial is taken over by the Academy. The provincial government establishes by decree that the Fine Arts section will depend on the Academy and that Emiliano Gómez Clara will be its director.
- 1926: The painting Bailarines (Dancers) by Emilio Pettoruti is acquired. This work is incorporated in the exhibitions of the Fine Arts section in the Museo Provincial.
- 1931: Exhibition of Painting and Sculpture. An exhibition of 130 works of art is held at the museum.
- 1933: The first Fine Arts Salon is held in Cordoba, which takes place in the Museo Provincial.
- 1942: Change of name. A request is made to change the name of the Fine Arts Salon to Fine Arts Museum. They also insist on a refurbishment of the building.
- 1950: The name Emilio Caraffa is adopted. By decree of the governor and of the Minister of Education and Culture, the museum is given the name Emilio Caraffa Museum.
- 1960: Opening of the museum’s library. The library bears the name of Deodoro Roca. The collections are increased through donations and the purchase of various works.
- 1967: Carlos Matías Funes is the new director between 1967 and 1982). During his tenure, in addition to a dedicated program of exhibitions and parallel activities, significant advances are made in the museum's internal organization. These include: updating inventories, systematizing procedures, consolidating the documentary archive, restoration, etc.
- 1968: Acquisition of works by painter Fernando Fader: a set of Fader's works is reintroduced into the collection. These works had been acquired by the provincial government in 1961.
- 1973: Museum Bulletin. Starting this year, and continuing throughout the decade, the museum regularly publishes a bulletin that promotes its exhibitions and major activities.
- 1978: Museum Expansion. There is a lack of space, which limits the development of the museum’s activities. Three years later, a project for the expansion of the museum is proposed.
- 1984: ESSO Painting and Drawing Prize. The award, organized by the Esso Foundation is presented this year at the Caraffa Museum. Several prize-winning works are added to the museum's collection.
- 1991: Major retrospective exhibition "120 Years of Painting in Córdoba," brings together works by artists associated with the local scene from 1871 to 1991, both from the museum's collection and others. There is a text that includes a periodization of Córdoba painting written by critic Nelly Perazzo.
- 1995: Important works from the Emilio Caraffa Museum's collection are rescued. There begins a series of exhibitions that gather works from the museum's collection around specific themes (genres, periods, etc.).
- 2000: The museum's collection continues to grow. Donations and occasional purchases are the primary means of acquisition during this decade and the next.
- 2004: "100 Years of Art in Córdoba", an exhibition that takes the form of an anthology of Córdoba's art is developed to celebrate the centenary of La Voz del Interior. The work of extensive research, with contributions from external collaborators, results in a printed volume.
- 2006: Museum expansion and re-functionalization. At the end of 2006, a law is approved for the museum's architectural expansion, and the architectural work begins. Simultaneously, the Ferreyra Palace is transformed into a permanent exhibition space for the Emilio Caraffa Museum collection. During this period when the museum is closed, it maintains an outreach program that sends exhibitions to cities in the interior of the province. The museum reopens in 2007.
- 2010: The collection of the Centro de Arte Contemporáneo Foundation is loaned to the Province under a contract of restitution. The collection includes works from the Córdoba Biennials of 1962, 1964, and 1966, and also several sets donated by artist Antonio Seguí. The collection is deposited in the Caraffa Museum, while continuing to be exhibited at the Evita Fine Arts Museum - Ferreyra Palace and other venues.

== Architecture ==
Kronfuss

The project to build the museum was commissioned to the Hungarian architect Johannes Kronfuss, who finished the project in 1915. The building was built in a neoclassical style and was aimed to house the museum and later on, of the Escuela de Artes Aplicadas. In 1938, the building that belonged to the Instituto del Profesorado de Educación Física (I.P.E.F.) was built. In 1962, the museum was enlarged and a new construction (of an irregular prism with medium-level platforms) occupied the place that Kronfuss intended for the patio of the museum.

In 1915, the government of Cárcano (a commune in the southeast of Córdoba) handed over the design of the building of the Provincial Museum to the Hungarian architect Juan Kronfuss who had recently settled down in Córdoba and was appointed as the province´s general director of architecture. Previously, in 1912, Kronfuss´s proposal had been rejected by Governor Garzón for being an architectural design in the Neocolonial style that did not correspond to the new ideas of progress. In this second instance, Kronfuss proposed a Neoclassical building that was accepted, this one was initially intended to house the fine arts section. The chosen location, an area next to the Plaza Chacabuco (nowadays Plaza España), would guarantee the museum an impressive presence in an area of the city that fully expressed the modernizing impulse: the Nueva Córdoba neighborhood. In 1916 the construction began and, in fact, it was delimited to the development of a small portion of what was planned by the architect.

The scheduled date for the end of the construction coincided with two significant events for the province. On one hand, the holding of the first Córdoba Art Salon, which eventually took place in the Pabellón de las Industrias (Industries Pavilion); and, on the other hand, the end of Cárcano's term as governor. The deadlines for the contract were not met and the construction was completed only on August 31, 1916. By then, the newly elected governor, the radical Eufrazio Loza, had appointed Deodoro Roca as the new Director of the Provincial Museum. Roca took possession of the building in September of that year, immediately carrying out the arrangements for the move of the art collection.

This peculiar situation (the delay in the execution of the work and the alternation of government) is the reason why the event was not the subject of any official inauguration ceremony and, therefore, going unnoticed in the press of the time. Nevertheless, the significance of the building was not small, it was one of the first buildings in Argentina built specifically to hold a museum of this kind, a fine arts collection. Over time, the building designed by Kronfuss became a kind of architectural icon for the city and, even after successive transformations, not only of the construction itself but of the surroundings, continues to be observed with awareness and curiosity.

Act of Enlargement and Refunctionalization of the Museum

In 2006, the provincial government started a museum project at great scale. Such project involved Caraffa Museum and aimed at the creation of a new space: Museo Superior de Bellas Artes Palacio Ferreyra (later named Evita Fine Arts Museum). The project planned an articulation between both institutions, based on a complementarity principle: Palacio Ferreyra would hold the permanent collection of Caraffa Museum, while Caraffa Museum would be oriented to temporary exhibitions and to continue the work related to the collection: it would still be storage place, and it would be in charge of the management of the institution (conservation, documentation, research, acquirement, etc.). Since the architectonic interventions follow the logic of the principle of complementarity, the Caraffa Museum is provided with big spaces for technical activities that would be in charge of the development of exhibitions and the tasks related to collection, such as storage, conservation and restoration workshop and documentation archive. This process was guaranteed by two provincial laws. The first one, Act No. 9345, allowed the creation of Museo Superior de Bellas Artes Palacio Ferreyra. The second one, Act No. 9355, established the enlargement of Caraffa Museum. After these legislative actions, the architectural work focused on the renovation of the building started. Such a process also includes the annexation of the I.P.E.F building.

Enlargement and renovation

The renovation of the Caraffa Museum annexed the building that used to be the house of the I.P.E.F. This project is part of a bigger one that includes the new Palacio Ferreyra Museum. The new Caraffa Museum has a wide variety of exhibition rooms for non-permanent or temporary exhibitions, as well as the necessary spaces for technical work that support the museum, such as classification, research, restoration, storage, library, administration, programming, design of the exhibition, among others.

In 2006, the process of enlargement and renovation of the museum started. The project was commissioned to the group of architects GGMPU, and the project concerning the new building that connected the museum with the I.P.E.F was given to MZARCH architects.

The main concept that guided the design was the creation of a new art museum, capable of grouping and linking the diverse facets of modern art. The preexisting surfaces from the original buildings were preserved, in a way that the new constructions are in continuous dialogue with the old ones. The internal distribution of the buildings is made through horizontal and vertical connectors that link diverse rooms and spaces, where the visitor is free to explore, following their own schedules or fixed itineraries.

Regarding the museum renovation itself, designed by GGMPU and Lucio Morini, the preexisting building posed some accessibility problems, fragmentation of internal spaces, which hindered free circulation, inadequate height of exhibition rooms and the scattered display of the buildings in that parcel. The intervention consisted of designing a connector-building which could occupy and develop in the environment. The idea was to connect every preexisting piece, allowing them to keep their individuality and original character, while at the same time, expressing the overall unity of the building complex. The connector-building was made with a metallic structure covered by a glass surface with different levels of transparency and opacity.

The change in the scale of the museum, which went from 1200m² to 4400m², produced a change in its center of gravity. This change motivated the modification of the main entrance, which now is made through a square at street level, thus solving the accessibility problem of the original entrance. At the same level, there is a café and an art library, and both have access from the square.

At the second level, the storage rooms from the original building were transformed into a new exhibition room.

At the third level, the medium-level floor from the 1962 enlargement was removed and replaced with a new one that unifies the space, providing height and leveling it with the restored rooms from the 1916 building. Such rooms have continuity thanks to a foyer that goes over the entrance square. This new foyer also has another entrance for groups of students.

At the next level, there is a bridge-room which connects itself to the adjacent building (former I.P.E.F.), making a continuous circuit together with the group of exhibition rooms located there. Taking advantage of the existing conditions, the project has opened multiple rooms, whose shapes, sizes, heights and lighting allow the development of a wide diversity of artistic manifestations.

== References and external links ==
- Provincia de Córdoba: Museo Caraffa (in Spanish)
- “Ley: 9345 MUSEO SUPERIOR DE BELLAS ARTES PALACIO FERREYRA” (2006) Archived from the original on 2024-08-22. Retrieved 2024-06-05
- “Ley: 9355 MUSEO PROVINCIAL DE BELLAS ARTES EMILIO A. CARAFFA.” (2007) Archived from the original on 2024-08-22. Retrieved 2024-06-05
- “Ley para la ampliación y refuncionalización del museo” (2006) Archived from the original on 2024-08-22. Retrieved 2024-06-05
- “UN EDIFICIO CENTENARIO (1916-2016)” (January 1, 2016) Archived from the original on 2024-08-22. Retrieved 2024-06-05
- PASTORELLI, Giuliano. (February 15, 2010) “Museo Provincial de Bellas Artes Emilio Caraffa / Lucio Morini + GGMPU Architect” Archived from the original on 2024-08-22. Retrieved 2024-06-05
- AGÜERO, Ana Clarisa. (2009) “El espacio del arte. Una microhistoria del Museo Politécnico de Córdoba entre 1911 y 1916.”(PDF). Archived from the original on 2024-08-22. Retrieved 2024-06-05
