= Xul Solar =

Argentine painter, sculptor, writer and inventor of imaginary languages

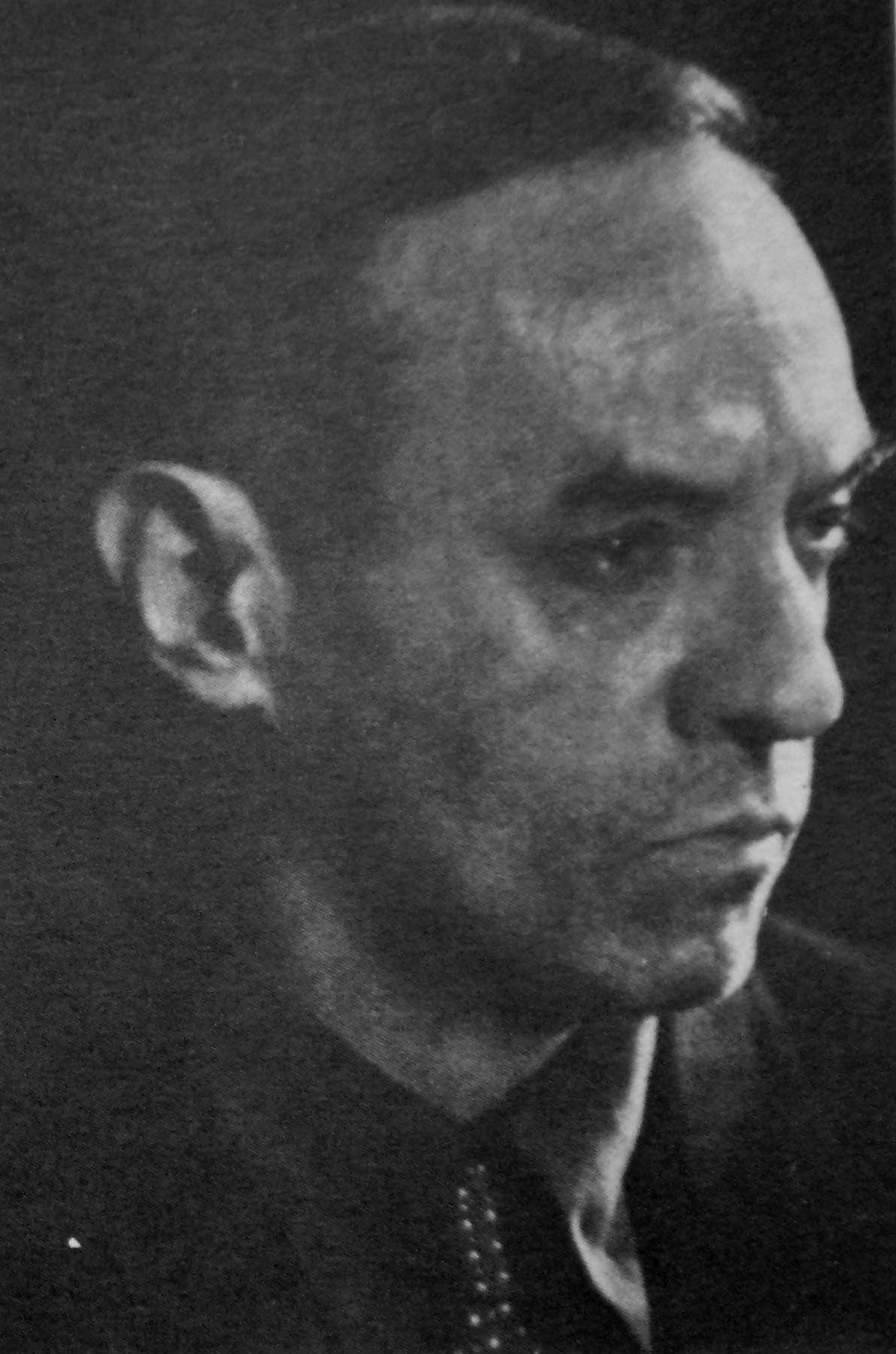
- Xul Solar
- Born: Oscar Agustín Alejandro Schulz Solari; 14 December 1887; San Fernando, Argentina
- Died: 9 April 1963 (aged 75); Tigre, Argentina
- Known for: Painter, sculptor, writer
- Movement: Expressionist, surrealist, symbolist, modernist

Xul Solar was the adopted name of Oscar Agustín Alejandro Schulz Solari (14 December 1887 – 9 April 1963), an Argentine painter, sculptor, writer, and inventor of imaginary languages.

== Biography ==
Oscar Agustín Alejandro Schulz Solari was born in San Fernando, Buenos Aires Province, to a cosmopolitan family. His father, Elmo Schulz Riga, of Baltic German origin, was born in the Latvian city of Riga, at that time part of Imperial Russia. His mother, originally from Italy, was named Agustina Solari. He was educated in Buenos Aires, first as a musician, then as an architect (although he never completed his architectural studies). After working as a schoolteacher and holding a series of minor jobs in the municipal bureaucracy, on 5 April 1912, he set out on the ship England Carrier, supposedly to work his passage to Hong Kong, but he disembarked in London and made his way to Turin. He returned to London to meet up with his mother and aunt, with whom he traveled to Paris, Turin (again), Genoa, and his mother's native Zoagli. Over the following few years, despite the onset of World War I, he would move among these cities, as well as Tours, Marseille, and Florence; towards the end of the war he served at the Argentine consulate in Milan.

During the years of the war, he struck up what was to be a lifelong friendship with Argentine artist Emilio Pettoruti, then a young man living in Italy and associated with the futurists. Also around that time, he began to pay more attention to painting, first with watercolor (which would always remain his main medium as a painter), although he gradually began working in tempera and – very occasionally — oils. He also adopted the pen name of Xul Solar. The first major exhibition of his art was in 1920 in Milan, together with sculptor Arturo Martini.

In 1916, Schulz Solari first signed his work "Xul Solar", ostensibly for the purposes to simplify the phonetics of his name, but an examination of the adopted name reveals that the first name is the reverse of "lux," which means "light" in Latin. Combined with "solar", the name reads as "the light of the sun", and demonstrates the artist's affinity for the universal source of light and energy. His father's name "Schulz" and "Xul" are pronounced the same in Spanish.

[H]e gave himself an extraterrestrial identity by modifying his parents' surnames and becoming Xul Solar. The first name reflected light, or lux, spelled backwards; the last, his maternal surname without the 'i,' was the sun itself.

— Caleb Bach

During the years that followed he continued his travels, extending his orbit to Munich and Hamburg. In 1924, his work was exhibited in Paris in a show of Latin American artists. He also struck up an acquaintance with British occultist Aleister Crowley and his mistress Leah Hirsig who held high hopes for his discipleship, but later that year he returned to Buenos Aires, where he promptly became associated with the avant garde "Florida group" (a.k.a. "Martín Fierro group"), a circle that also included Jorge Luis Borges, with whom he was to keep an association and close friendship. It was in this group that he also met poet and novelist Leopoldo Marechal who would immortalize him as the astrologer Schultze in his famous novel Adam Buenosayres. He began to exhibit frequently in the galleries of Buenos Aires, notably in a 1926 exhibition of modern painters that included Norah Borges (sister of Jorge Luis Borges) and Emilio Pettoruti. Throughout the rest of his life, he exhibited regularly in Buenos Aires and Montevideo, Uruguay, but he would not have another major European exhibition until his twilight years. In 1962, a year before his death, he had a major exposition at the Musée National d'Art Moderne in Paris. He died at his house in Tigre on 9 April 1963. Pettoruti published his biography five years later.

== Work and interests ==
Solar's paintings are mainly sculptures, often using striking contrasts and bright colours, typically in relatively small formats. His visual style seems equidistant between Wassily Kandinsky and Paul Klee on the one hand and Marc Chagall on the other. He also worked in some extremely unorthodox artistic media, such as modifying pianos, including a version with three rows of keys.

The poet Fernando Demaría in an essay "Xul Solar y Paul Klee" (published in the Argentine magazine Lyra, 1971), wrote, "It is not easy for the human spirit to elevate itself from astrology to astronomy, but we would be making a mistake if we forget that an authentic astrologer, like Xul Solar, is close to the source of the stars... The primitivism of Xul Solar is anterior to the appearance of the Gods. The Gods correspond to a more evolved form of energy."

Solar had a strong interest in astrology; at least as early as 1939 he began to draw astrological charts. He also had an interest in Buddhism and believed strongly in reincarnation. He also developed his own set of tarot cards. His paintings reflect his religious beliefs, featuring objects such as stairs, roads and the representation of God.

He invented two fully elaborated imaginary languages, symbols from which figure in his paintings, and was also an exponent of duodecimal mathematics. He said of himself "I am maestro of a writing no one reads yet." One of his invented languages was called "Neo Criollo", a poetic fusion of Portuguese and Spanish, which he reportedly would frequently use as a spoken language in talking to people. He also invented a "Pan Lingua", which aspired to be a world language linking mathematics, music, astrology and the visual arts, an idea reminiscent of Hermann Hesse's "glass bead game". Indeed, games were a particular interest of his, including his own invented version of chess, or more precisely "non-chess".

Outside of Argentina, Solar may best be known for his association with Borges. In 1940, he figured as a minor character in Borges's semi-fictional "Tlön, Uqbar, Orbis Tertius"; in 1944, he illustrated a limited edition (300 copies) of Un modelo para la muerte, written by Borges and Adolfo Bioy Casares, writing together under the pseudonym B. Suárez Lynch. He and Borges had common interests in German expressionistic poetry, the works of Emanuel Swedenborg, Algernon Charles Swinburne and William Blake, and Eastern philosophy, especially Buddhism and the I Ching.

== Discussion of Entierro and Fiordo ==
=== Entierro, 1914, watercolor on paper ===
Entierro. painting, 1915

After a brief experimentation with oils, Xul chose the watercolors and tempera that would become his preferred media. Instead of large-scale canvases, Xul painted on small sheets of paper, sometimes mounting his finished works on sheets of cardboard. One of his early works in what would become his signature format, Entierro (Burial) demonstrates the confluence of Xul's internal thoughts and external influences.

The image is of a funeral procession of beings, possibly celestial, led by an angel-figure floating above the ground. The profiles of the figures suggest Pre-Columbian art, and possibly an ancient Egyptian influence, as well. The angel-figure as well as the mourners have luminous peaks above their heads, in a re-imagining of halos. The shapes of the peaks are repeated by tongues of fire that point up from the bottom edge of the painting. The image strongly suggests an afterworld, but it is not clear from the image whether the environment correlates to tradition Christian understandings of heaven or hell. Xul Solar provides his viewer with a new image of an afterlife.

Two figures hold a shrouded corpse, which is also surrounded by flames. The hands of the corpse are folded, but above the corpse, a figure resembling a fetus emerges. That Xul uses a fetus instead of an image of a deceased person of typical age leads one to read the image as a depiction of reincarnation, representing a break from traditional Catholic ideas of life and death, and demonstrating the investigation into disparate spiritualities which would continue for the rest of Xul's life. As the figures recede in the painting, Xul reduces them to geometric shapes. The forms cease to be recognizable as beings, and then are transformed into what can be a tomb, or portal. That all the mourners are of the same color as the temple indicates that they, just like the deceased, will make the same transition someday.

Xul Solar's life during his twenties was marked by profound existential crisis. His writings at the time reveal a profound desire for creative expression, and a kind of angst caused by the profusion of ideas and thoughts he entertained,

"Dazzling light, colors never seen, harmonies of ecstasies and of hell, unheard-of sounds, a new beauty that is mine… If my damaging sorrows are due to labor in childbirth, I am pregnant with an immense, new world!"

Author Mario H. Gradowczyk describes Xul at this point in his life as "a visionary rabidly opposed to the canons reigning in the Buenos Aires of his time". Like other artistically inclined people of his generation, Xul sought to study in Europe, and settled for a time in Paris while it was an epicenter for avant-garde art. The city was home to the Cubists, while attracting Italian futurists, Russian artists, and participating in the dialogue about German Expressionism. There was also a fashion for sculpture and objects brought back to Europe by anthropologists and traders from African and Pacific Ocean colonies, as well as the Americas.

The artistic canons that Gradowczyk refers to were propagated by the official Argentine art institutions, which favored visual representations associated with national icons. Painters like Carlos P. Ripamonte, Cesáreo Bernaldo de Quirós, and Fernando Fader extolled images of pampas landscapes and rural gaucho culture. The arrival of Spanish intellectuals such as José Ortega y Gasset and Eugenio d'Ors created a new discourse around art that was disseminated among writers and artists working toward an aesthetic modernity. Entierros firmly places Xul Solar as a member of this modernist Argentine movement. Rather than painting subjects recognizable as Argentine, Xul's focus is internal, painting from his own imagination. His early artistic output seems to represent the profusion of ideas and themes that grew out of Xul's contemplations. The flat shapes and bold colors used in the painting demonstrate a Cubist influence. The faces of the figures, particularly the eyes and shapes of heads can be seen as owing to the fashion for art and artifacts from Africa and the Americas mentioned above.

=== Fiordo, 1943, tempera on paper mounted on board ===
The severe, bleak, landscape in Fiordo suggests ancient Chinese and Japanese prints. Narrow mountains with undulating edges stab up from placid water. Here, Xul communicates his affinity with Asian forms and, in turn, ideas. The ladders that criss-cross the mountains, are described by Gradowczyk as symbolizing spirituality, both of the ascendant nature as well as with the possibility of descent. The single figure in the bottom corner suggests a hermetic existence, a difficult spiritual path that is mirrored in the steep staircases. The figure holds a book in one hand and what appears to be a lantern in the other, representing study and guidance. Xul tells his viewer that while spiritual pursuit can be arduous, others have established a path, and they point the way. A structure appears atop one mountain, ostensibly a temple. None of the ladders lead directly to the mountain peak, however. The path twists and turns, and the doors cut into the mountainsides represent the stages, and possible moments of being waylaid, as one endeavors spiritually.

From 1943 and 1944, Xul's painting was influenced by his thoughts on the Second World War. The sudden, powerful emergence of inhumanity and the potential effects on the world at large wore very heavily on the artist. Gradowczyk posits that "Xul reached his highest point of artistic expressivity in these ascetic paintings whose theme corresponded to that anguishing reality".

== Legacy ==
In 1939, Xul initiated a project to establish a "universal club," which he called "Pan Klub" in Neocriollo. His purpose was to create a type of salon for intellectuals and those of mutual interests, and inaugurated the club at his home. Nearly fifty years later, his widow, Micaela (Lita) Cadenas established the Fundación Pan Klub, based on the original precepts set by Xul during his lifetime. This foundation established the Museo Xul Solar in 1993, in a building whose design was based on Xul's work. The museum exhibits works that Xul selected for the Pan Klub, as well as houses objects, sculptures, and the documents compiling his personal archive. The foundation also preserves Xul's home, where his extensive library is located.

From 1980 to 1996, an Argentine literary magazine named Xul was published. In the essay that accompanied the publication of its anthology, several reasons are given for why the magazine was named as such. The last paragraph of the essay begins, "What should have been first remains for the last: XUL, the name of the magazine, was an homage to Xul Solar, a singularly complex individual, writer among many other things, although he was known mainly as one of the principal plastic artists of Argentina."

== Quotes ==
"I am a world champion of a game that nobody yet knows called panchess (Panajedrez). I am master of a script that nobody yet reads. I am creator of a technique, of a musical grafía that allows the piano to be studied in a third of the usual time that it takes today. I am director of a theatre that as yet has not begun working. I am creator of a universal language called panlingua based on numbers and astrology that will help people know each other better. I am creator of twelve painting techniques, some of them surrealist, and others that transpose a sensory, emotional world on to canvas, and that will produce in those that listen a Chopin suite, a Wagnerian prelude, or a stanza sung by Beniamino Gigli. I am the creator, and this is what most interests me at the moment, apart from the exhibition of painting that I am preparing, of a language that is desperately needed by Latin America."

-From Xul Solar's own writings

"Although this is a time when art is more individual and arbitrary than ever, it would be a mistake to call it anarchic. In spite of so much confusion, there exists a well-defined tendency toward simplicity of means, toward clear and solid architecture, toward the pure plastic sense that protects and accents abstract meanings of line, mass, and color, all within a complete liberty of subject and composition…

Let us admit, in any case, that among us now – if mostly still hidden – are many or all of the seeds of our future art, and not in museums overseas, and not in the homes of famous foreign dealers. Let us honor the rare ones, our rebellious spirits who, like this artist, before denying others, find affirmation in themselves; that instead of destroying, seek to build. Let us honor those who struggle so that the soul of our country can be more beautiful.

Because the wars of independence for our America are not yet over…"

-Excerpted from an article written in anticipation of Emilio Pettoruti's first Buenos Aires exhibition for the magazine Martín Fierro, 9 October 1924

== Selected exhibitions ==
- 1920 – Xul Solar and the sculptor Arturo Martini, Galleria Arte, Milan, 27 November to 16 December
- 1924 – Exposition d’Art Américain-Latin, Musée Gallièra, Paris, 15 March to 15 April
- 1924 – Primer Salón Libre, Witcomb, Buenos Aires
- 1925 – Salón de los Independientes, Buenos Aires
- 1926 – Exposición de Pintores Modernos, Amigos del Arte, Buenos Aires
- 1929 – Xul Solar, Amigos del Arte, Buenos Aires, May
- 1930 – Salón de Pintores y Escultores Modernos, Amigos del Arte, Buenos Aires, October
- 1940 – Xul Solar, Amigos del Arte, Buenos Aires
- 1949 – Xul Solar, Galería Samos, Buenos Aires
- 1951 – Xul Solar, Galería Guión, Buenos Aires
- 1952 – Pintura y Escultura Argentina de Este Siglo, Museo Nacional de Bellas Artes, Buenos Aires
- 1953 – Xul Solar, Galería van Riel, Sala V, Buenos Aires
- 1963 – Homenaje a Xul Solar, Museo Nacional de Bellas Artes, Buenos Aires
- 1965 – Xul Solar: Exposición Retrospectiva, Galería Proar, Buenos Aires
- 1966 – III Bienal Americana de Arte: Homenaje a Xul Solar, Museo Provincial de Bellas Artes, Córdoba
- 1978 – Xul Solar, Galería Rubbers, Buenos Aires
- 1993 – Xul Solar: A Collector’s Vision, Rachel Adler Gallery, New York
- 1994 – Xul Solar: the Architectures, Courtauld Institute Galleries, London
- 2005 – Xul Solar: Visiones y Revelaciones, Colección Costantini, Buenos Aires, 17 June to 15 August
- 2013 – Xul Solar and Jorge Luis Borges: The Art of Friendship , Americas Society, New York, 18 April to 20 July; and Phoenix Art Museum, Phoenix, AZ, 21 September to 31 December.

== Selected works ==
- Nido de Fénices, Oil on board, c. 1914, private collection
- Paisaje con Monumento, Oil on board, c. 1914, Private collection, Buenos Aires
- Dos Anjos, 1915, Watercolor on paper, Museo Xul Solar, Buenos Aires
- Entierro, 1915, Watercolor on paper, Museo Xul Solar, Buenos Aires
- Ofrenda Cuori, 1915, Watercolor on paper mounted on card, Museo Xul Solar, Buenos Aires
- Reptil Que Sube, 1920, Watercolor on paper, Museo Xul Solar, Buenos Aires
- Casas en Alto, 1922, Watercolor on paper, Museo Xul Solar, Buenos Aires
- Grafía Antiga, 1939, Tempera on paper, Museo Xul Solar, Buenos Aires
- Fiordo, 1943, Tempera on paper, Museo Xul Solar, Buenos Aires
- Pan Game and Marionette I Ching at the Museum of Modern Art (c. 1945)
- Casi Plantas, 1946, Tempera on paper, Museo Xul Solar, Buenos Aires
- Muros Biombos, 1948, Watercolor on paper, Museo Xul Solar, Buenos Aires
- Pan Arbol, 1954, Watercolor on paper, Museo Xul Solar, Buenos Aires
- Proyecto fachada para Elsetta (Façade Project for Elsetta), 1954. Pérez Art Museum Miami, United States
- Cruz, 1954, Wood and watercolor, Museo Xul Solar, Buenos Aires
- Grafía, 1961, Tempera on paper, Museo Xul Solar, Buenos Aires
- Mi Pray Per To Min Guardianjo, 1962, Tempera on paper, Museo Xul Solar, Buenos Aires

== Bibliography ==
- Bastos Kern, Maria Lucia. "The Art Field in Buenos Aires: Debates and Artistic Practices." Xul Solar: Visiones Y Revelaciones. Buenos Aires: Malba – Coleccion Costantini, 2005. 222–228.
- Castro, Fernando (4 April 2012). "Xul Solar: Vanguardista esotérico". Literal: Latin American Voices. 4. (Spanish).
- Gradowczyk, Mario H. Alejandro Xul Solar. Buenos Aires: Ediciones ALBA, 1994.
- Marzio, Peter C. "The Dialectic of Xul Solar." Xul Solar: Visiones Y Revelaciones. Buenos Aires: Malba – Coleccion Costantini, 2005. 187.
- Nelson, Daniel E. "Xul Solar's San Signos: the Book of Changes." Xul Solar: Visiones Y Revelaciones. Buenos Aires: Malba – Coleccion Costantini, 2005. 209–215.
- Santiago Perednik, Jorge. "XUL: Variations on the Name of a Magazine." The XUL Reader: an Anthology of Argentine Poetry. Ed. Ernesto Livon Grossman. New York: Segue Foundation, 1996. xvii–xxiii.
- Schwartz, Jorge. "Let the Stars Compose Syllables: Xul and Neo-Creole." Xul Solar: Visiones Y Revelaciones. Buenos Aires: Malba – Coleccion Costantini, 2005. 200–208.
- Solar, xul. "Emilio Pettoruti." Readings in Latin American Modern Art. Ed. Patrick Frank. New Haven: Yale UP, 2004. 19–21.
- Tedin, Teresa. "Biographical and Artistic Chronology." Xul Solar: Visiones Y Revelaciones. Buenos Aires: Malba – Coleccion Costantini, 2005. 244–251.
- "History." Museo Xul Solar. Fundacion Pan Klub – Museo Xul Solar. 21 May 2008 <http://www.xulsolar.org.ar/xulintro-i.html >.
