= Ramón Silva (painter) =

Argentine painter

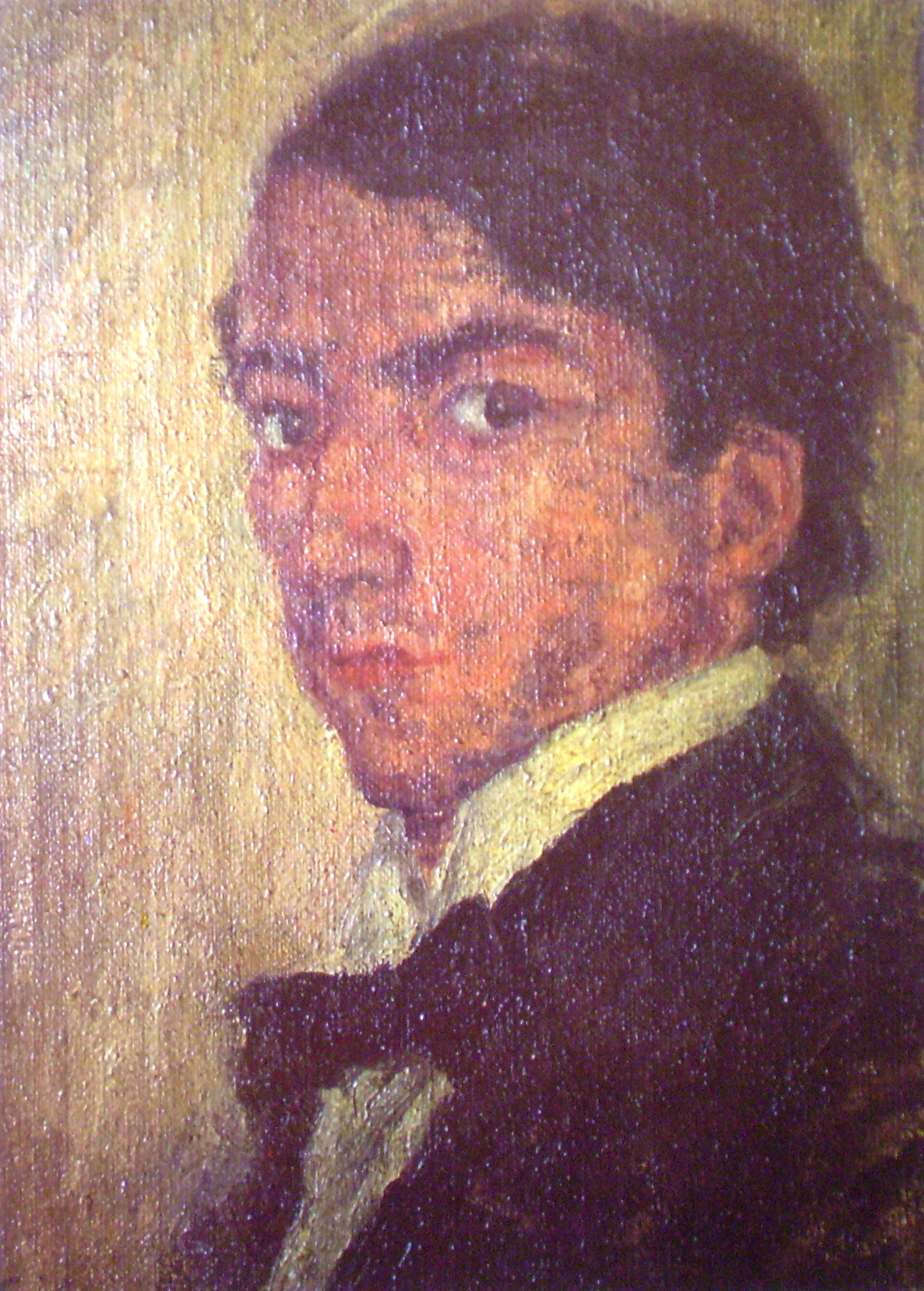
Ramón Silva (self portrait, 1915).

Ramón Silva (August 8, 1890 - June 17, 1919) was an Argentine painter of the Post-impressionist school.

== Life and work ==
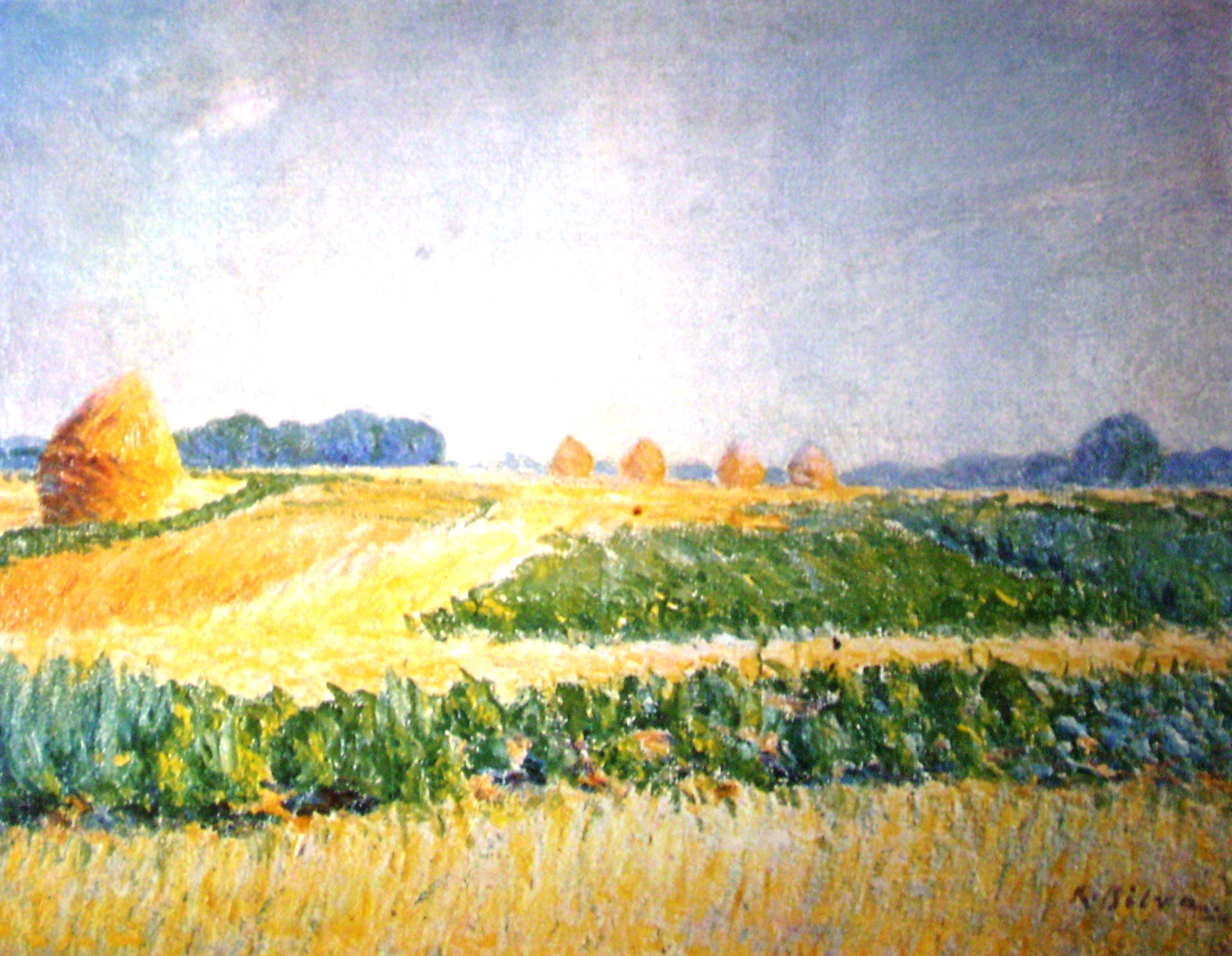
Wheat Field in the Sun, oil on canvas, 1914.

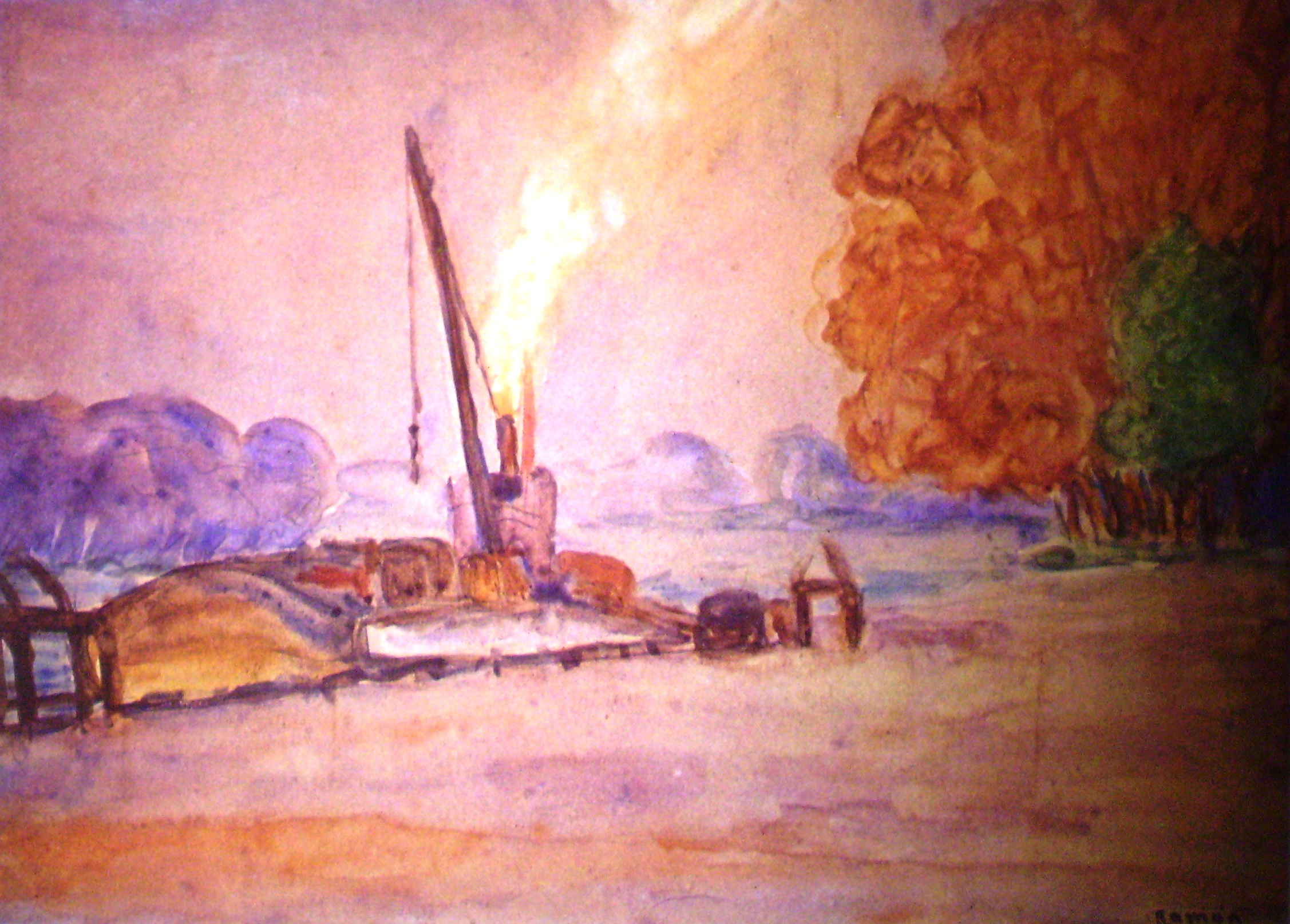
Landscape on the Seine, watercolor, 1918.

Ramón Silva was born in Buenos Aires, Argentina in 1890. A self-taught painter, he learned the art beginning 1908 at the atelier managed by Martín Malharro, whose display at a 1902 Buenos Aires art exposition introduced normally conservative Argentine audiences to the Impressionist movement. The promising student was sponsored by one of the nation's foremost physicians at the time, Dr. Luis Agote, for a 1911 scholarship that took him to Paris, where he received influences from the Post-impressionist artists then current in Europe, particularly Alfred Sisley.

Returning to Buenos Aires in 1915, his watercolors received little acceptance and were judged to be more akin to the Postimpressionist approach of artists such as Fernando Fader and Cesáreo Bernaldo de Quirós (the Nexos group), then still pariahs among most local critics. Preferring solitude, Silva worked mostly in and around the arboretum at Parque Tres de Febrero, an extensive park in the Buenos Aires district of Palermo.

Remaining in poverty, Ramón Silva contracted pneumonia, which cost him his life in 1919 at age 28.
