= Sarmiento Park =

Park in Córdoba, Argentina

Coordinates: 31°25′49″S 64°10′32″W

- Interactive map of Sarmiento Park

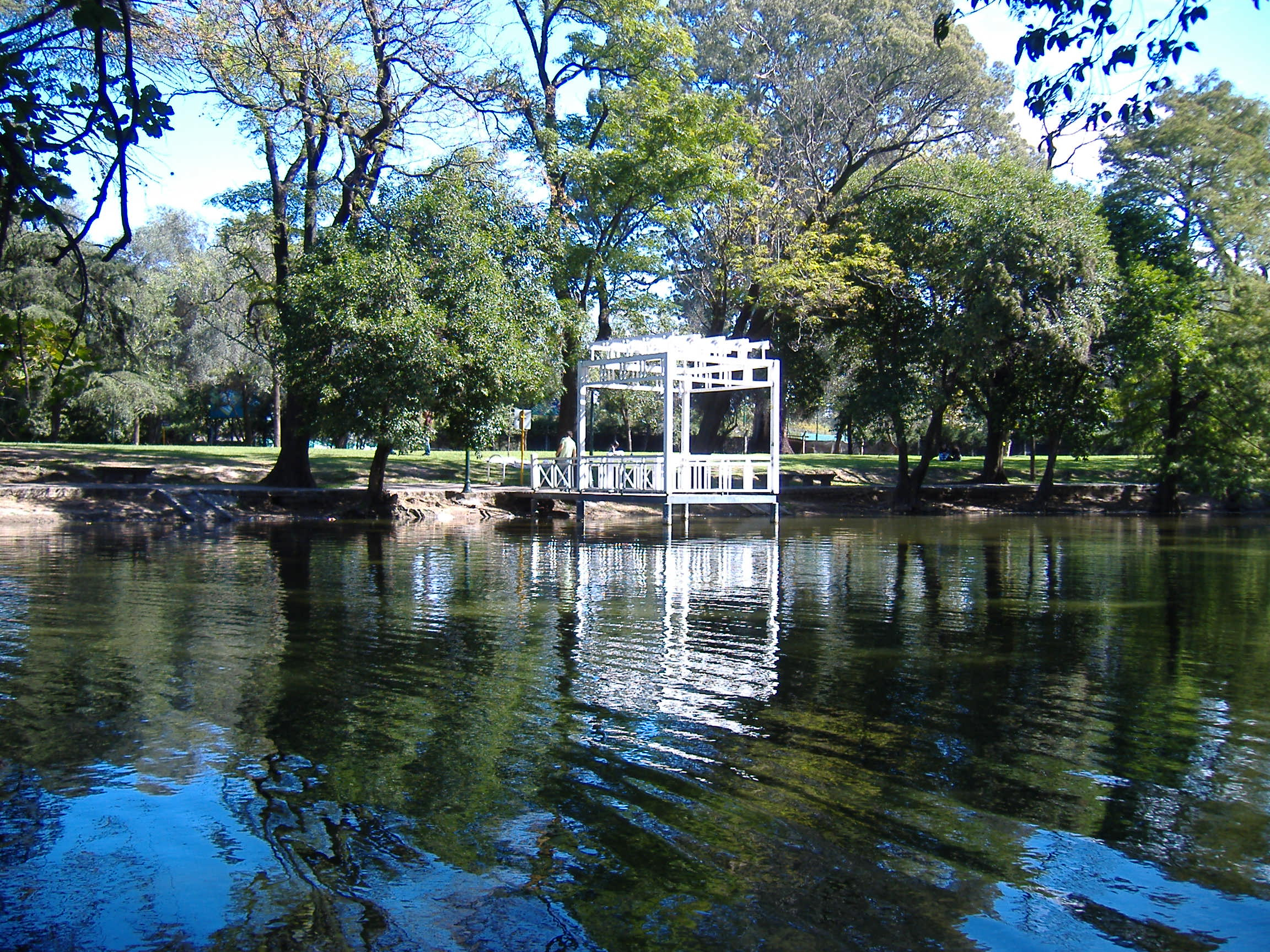
The duck lake

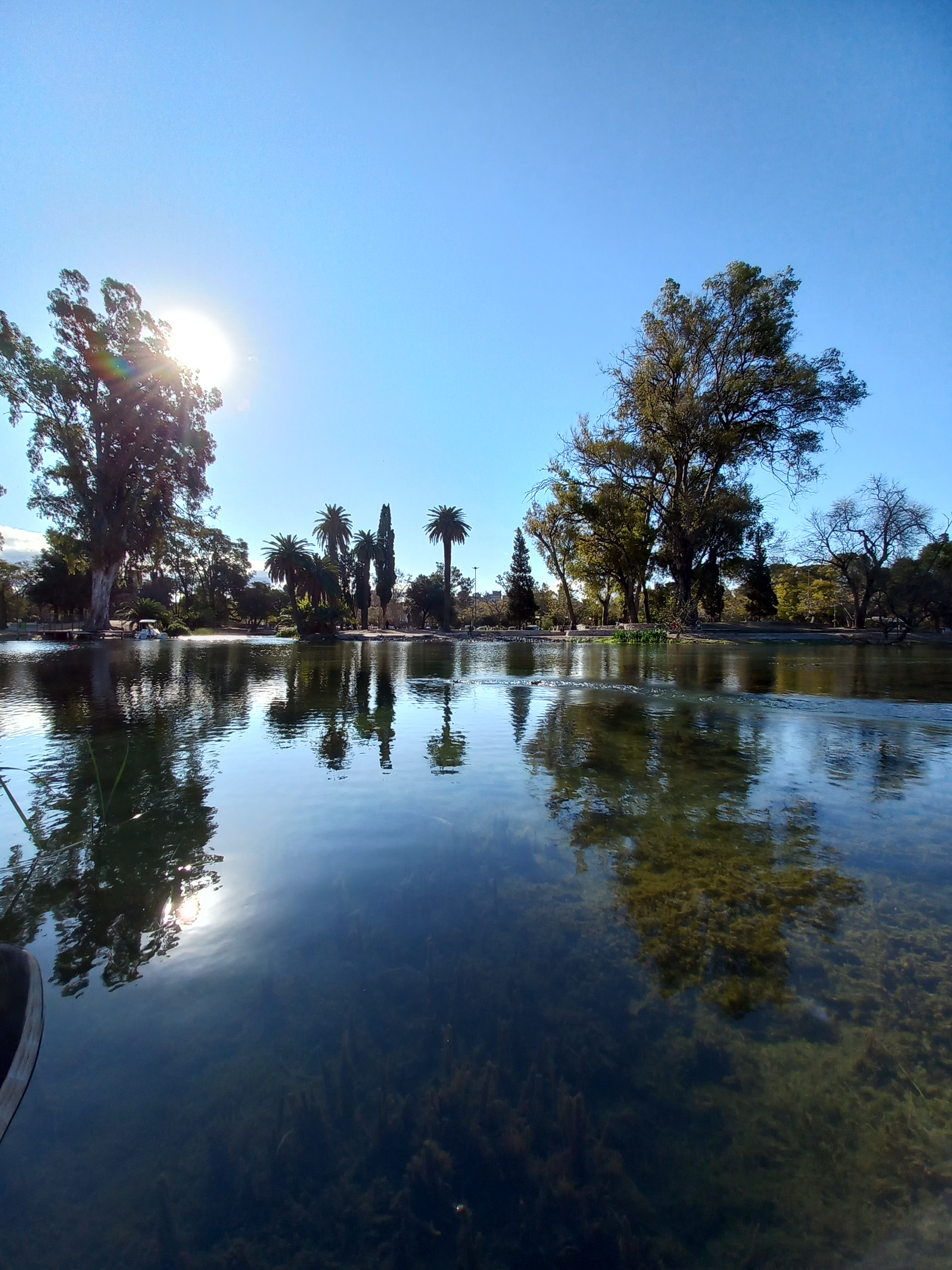
Duck lake 2024

Sarmiento Park is the largest public park in Córdoba, Argentina.

== Overview ==
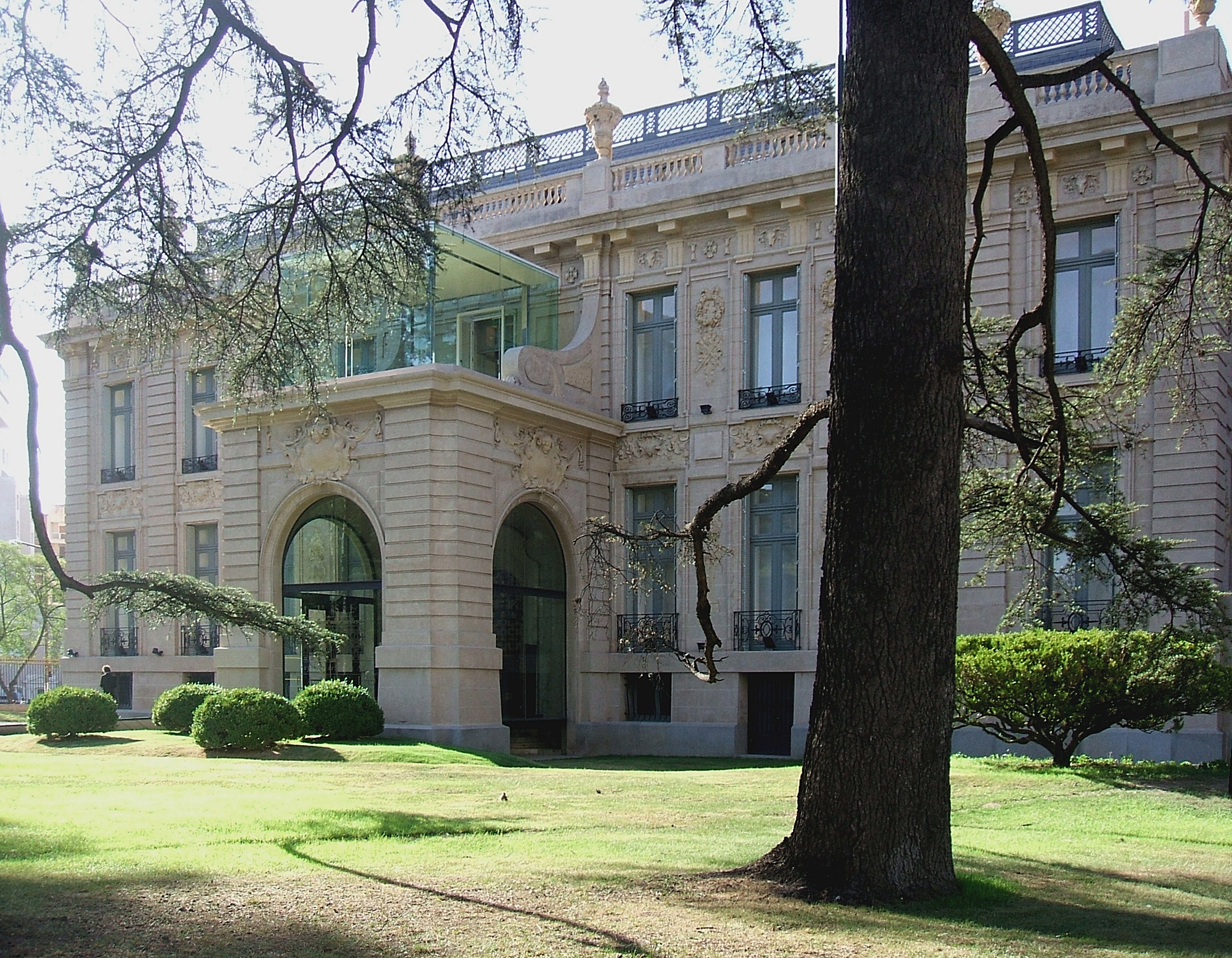
The Ferreyra palace, today the Evita Perón Museum of Art

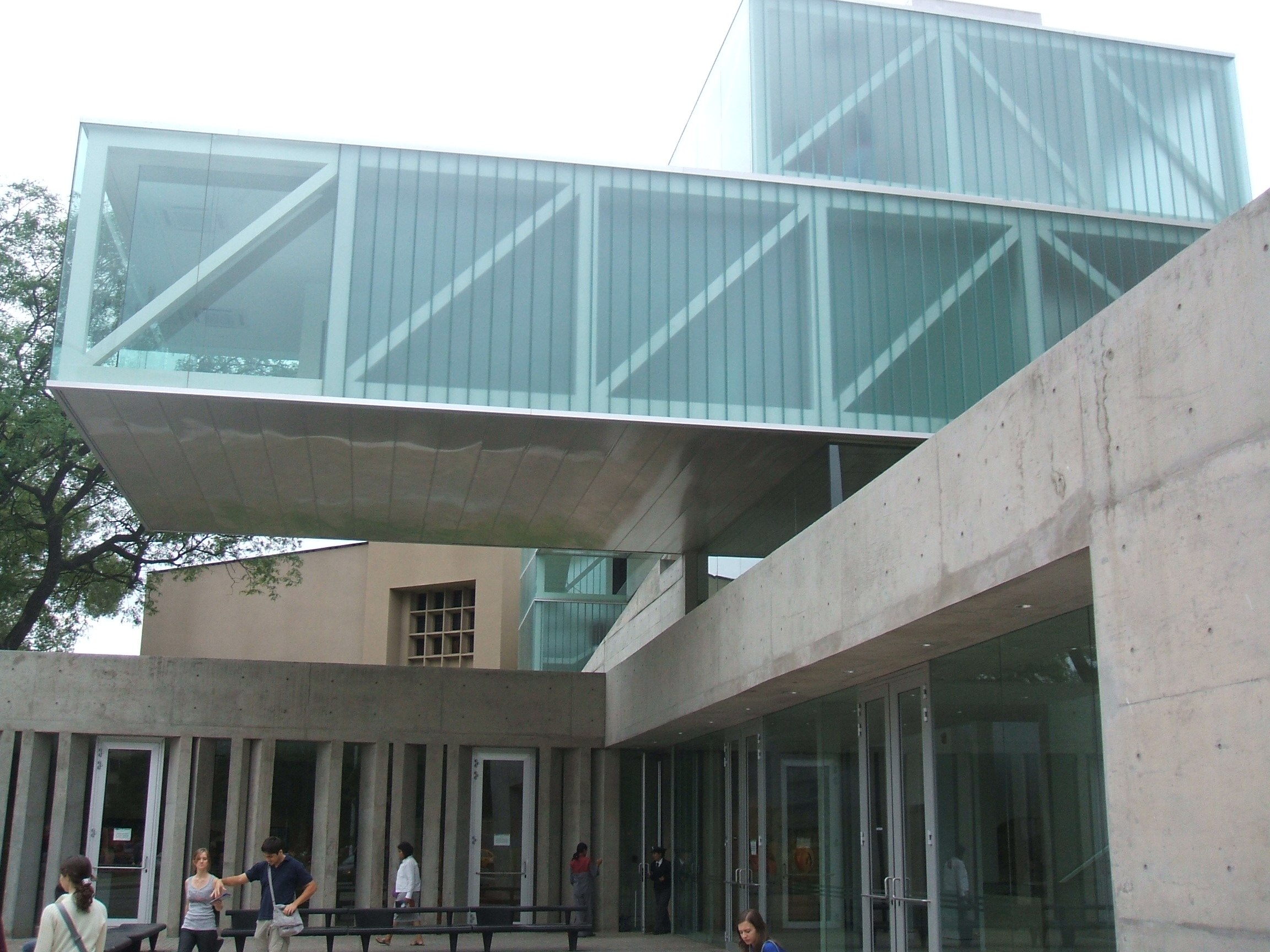
The Emilio Caraffa Museum of Fine Art.

The development of a suburb south of the rapidly growing Córdoba of the late nineteenth century created the need for an extensive new green space for the area. The new neighborhood's chief developer, Miguel Crisol, commissioned a French urbanist for the task in 1889, Carlos Thays. Newly arrived, Thays planned the new park on a plateau overlooking the Cañada Brook to the west and the National University of Córdoba's colonial campus to the south. This would be the first of over a dozen ambitious urban design projects Thays would undertake across Argentina until his death in 1934.

Work began in 1890 on the 17 hectare (43 acre) park and, upon its opening in 1911, it was named Parque Sarmiento in honor of former President Domingo Sarmiento, the noted promoter of the national educational system born one hundred years earlier. The park and its rose garden quickly became the preferred surroundings for many in Córdoba high society and, in 1912, Dr. Juan Ferreyra bought adjacent land for his Beaux Arts mansion, completed in 1916.

Civic projects soon joined upscale residential ones. An initiative by German Argentine immigrant José Scherer led to the creation of a city zoo at the park in 1915. The city's arts patrons had the Provincial Museum of Fine Arts (later renamed for painter Emilio Caraffa) built facing the park the same year and, in 1918, the city opened a natatorium and an amphitheatre.

The surrounding neighborhood grew to over 25,000 by the year 2000, by which time Sarmiento Park suffered from the twin problems of overuse and budgetary constraints. The recent nationwide economic recovery, however, translated into a dramatic reversal of this trend for the park. The zoo was reopened in 2006 following extensive refurbishment, the Ferreyra palace was adapted for the creation of the Evita Fine Arts Museum in 2007 and the existing Caraffa Fine Arts Museum was given a new wing. The city also welcomed the new Museum of Natural Sciences at the park in 2007. In tune with the city's new humor, Mayor Daniel Giacomino reinaugurated the restored park natatorium with a belly flop in 2008.

Located within the park is the Bicentennial Lighthouse.

In 2023, during Mayor Llarllora's ruling, the zoo was turned into a "Biodiversity Park". It is a 17-hectares park in the middle of the city. Entrance is free and visitors can either do a self-guided tour or they can also book a guided tour of about 150 minutes.
