= Héctor Dante Cincotta =

Argentine writer (1943–2025)

insert a caption here

Héctor Dante Cincotta (4 April 1943 – 15 July 2025) was an Argentine poet, scholar and literary critic, who received the Argentine National Prize for Literature in 1993, as well as other prizes. Among his more than seventy books, his poetry collections include “The Antiquity of the Clouds” (La antigüedad de las nubes, 1972, translated into English as in 1999) and “The Testimony of Days” (El testimonio de los días, 1975). Among his essayistic books are “Time and Nature in the Works of Ricardo E. Molinari” (El tiempo y la naturaleza en la obra de Ricardo E. Molinari, 1992), “Studies in Argentine Poetry” (Estudios de poesía argentina, 1994) and “Argentine Letters” (Letras Argentinas, 2012). His works have been translated into Italian, French, English, German, Chinese, Turkish, etc.

== Life and career ==
Cincotta was born in La Plata on 4 April 1943. Often giving lectures abroad, he traveled extensively throughout Europe, South America and the USA. His poetry is classicist in its subject and its expression and he regarded art as a collaborative effort, therefore working with such renowned illustrators as: Libero Badii, Carlos Páez Vilaró, Raúl Soldi, Norah Borges, Aída Carballo, Leopoldo Presas, Carlos Alonso, Guillermo Roux and Ricardo Supisiche, among others. He defended poetry as a philosophical and emotional expression that rarely reflects daily life in a direct way. When he wrote, he spoke with a clear, musical voice, very much like Ricardo Molinari's, that does not aim to correct the surrounding social reality.

His critical works discuss themes that have dominated literary debate in Latin America since the 1960s, including not only aesthetic issues but also the role of Argentine literature in Latin America, emphasizing both the unity of the region and its intrinsic diversity. A main source of inspiration are some of the authors that he explores, including Percy B. Shelley, John Keats, Robert Graves, Nicolás Guillén, Jorge Luis Borges, Alfonso Reyes, Juan Ramón Jiménez, Miguel Hernández, etc.

Cincotta died on 15 July 2025, at the age of 82.

== Selected works ==
=== Poetry ===
- Oda italiana (1967)
- La antigüedad de las nubes (1972)
- Sobre los ríos, el amor y el aire (1973)
- El árbol (1973)
- El recuerdo (seis sonetos a la casa) (1974)
- Una rosa transparente para Rilke (epístola) (1975)
- El testimonio de los días (1975)
- Pájaros para la muerte de Saint-John Perse (1976)
- Poesía portuguesa (1977)
- Memorial del cielo y de los pájaros (1979)
- El contemplado (1982)
- El pesaroso (1987)
- I giorni di nebia (1996)
- Esta esplendente nada del poniente (1996)
- Tres poemas par una ausencia uruguaya (2001)
- Este largo deseo (2002)
- El dichoso recuerdo (2005)
- El sendero (2009)

=== Essay ===
- Jorge Luis Borges (1973)
- El tiempo y la naturaleza en la obra de Ricardo E. Molinari (1992)
- Estudios de poesía argentina (1994)
- El tiempo y las letras (1996)
- Poesía argentina (1997)
- Carlyle y Chatterton (2008)
- Mariano Melgar (2009)
- Letras argentinas (2012)
- Guillen y Neruda (2012)
- Perspectiva de Robert Graves (2013)
- Virginia Woolf y Christopher Marlowe (2014)
