= Bicentennial Lighthouse =

Bicentennial Lighthouse (Faro del Bicentenario)
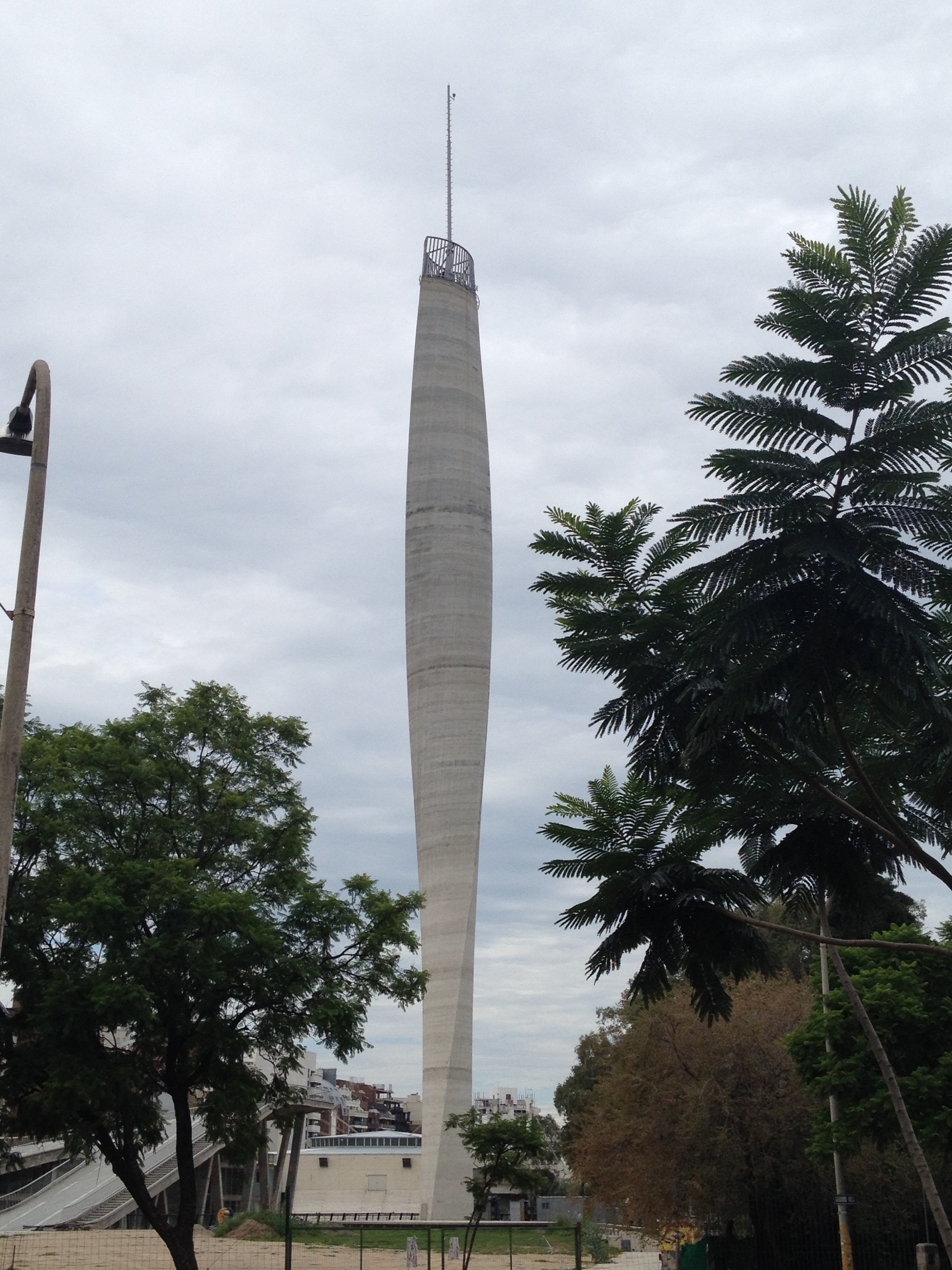
- Interactive map of Bicentennial Lighthouse (Faro del Bicentenario)
- Location: Córdoba, Argentina
- Coordinates: 31°25′42″S 64°10′56″W
- Height: 102 m (335 ft)
- Beginning date: 2010
- Opening date: June 2, 2011

The Bicentennial Lighthouse or Faro del Bicentenario is a lighthouse-like monument located in Sarmiento Park, Córdoba, Argentina. It stands 335 feet (102 m). The opening was attended by Cordoba Governor Juan Schiaretti who said that it was intended to serve as a city icon.

== Description ==
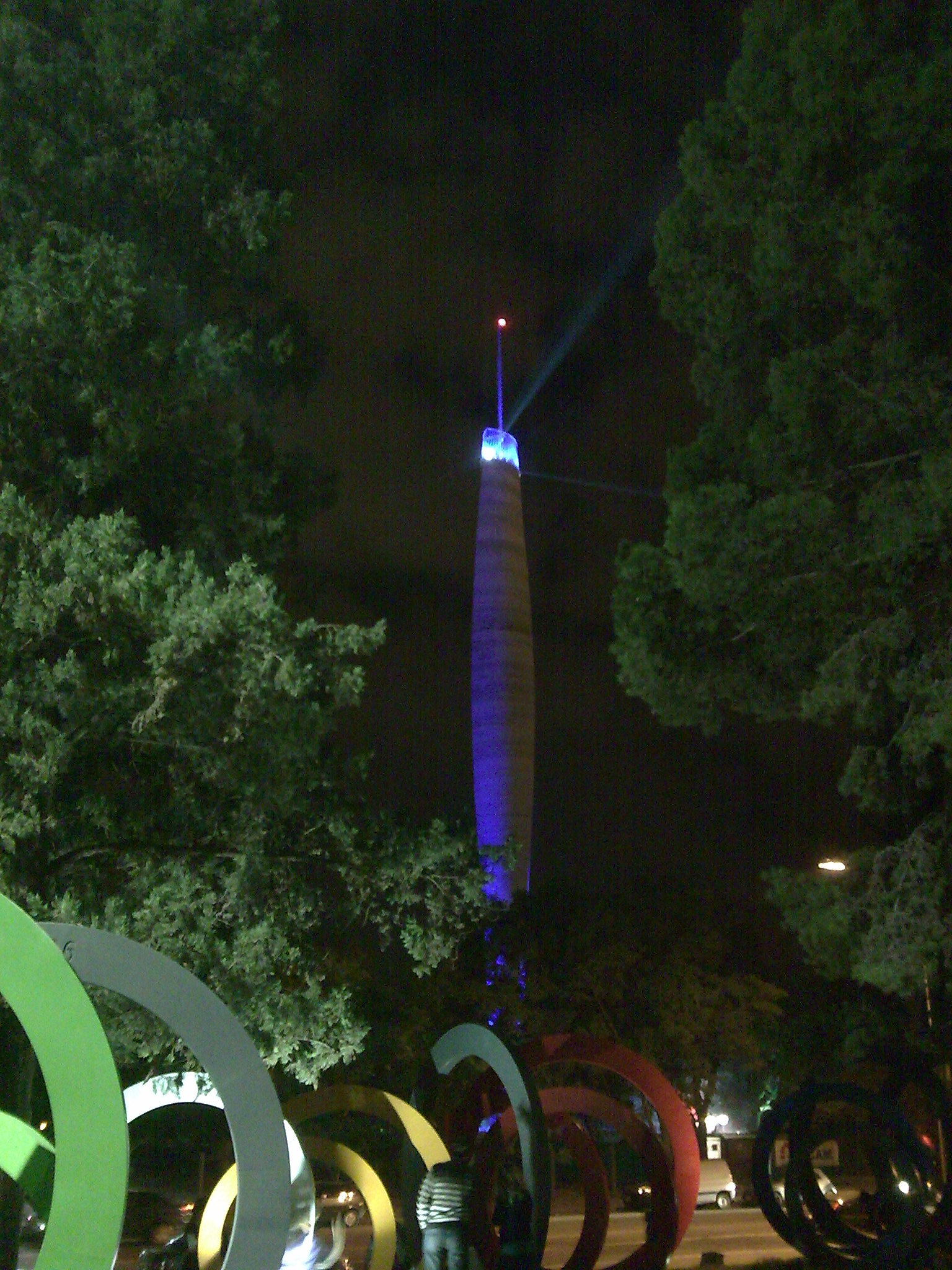
Bicentennial Lighthouse illuminated with light-emitting diodes

Designed by Alejandro Cohen and built in the style of structural expressionism, this monument was created as a tribute to the Argentina Bicentennial. The structure is an 80-metre-tall partial helix with a ninety degree twist. Atop this reinforced concrete tower is an antenna that brings the total height of this monument to 102 metres. At night, the tower is illuminated using light-emitting diodes. There are internal stairs to enable access to the top, however, they are not open to the public.

At the foot of the structure is an area of 1,500 square meters used for exhibition rooms and an auditorium.

After eight months of construction and a cost of nine million pesos, it opened on June 2, 2011, while still lacking the glass panel required to make it complete.
