= Emilio Caraffa =

Argentine painter

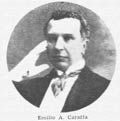
- Emilio Caraffa
- Born: 1862; Catamarca, Argentina
- Died: 1939 (aged 76–77); La Cumbre, Argentina
- Known for: Painter
- Movement: Post-Impressionism

Emilio Caraffa (1862–1939) was an Argentine painter of the Post-Impressionist school.

== Life and work ==
Emilio Caraffa was born in Catamarca, Argentina, in 1862. His family relocated to Rosario, where he attended the local National College (a system of public college preparatory schools), and learned to draw and sketch. He received lessons in painting in Buenos Aires from 1883 to 1884, an experience which earned him a scholarship from the Minister of Justice and Culture, Eduardo Wilde. Caraffa attended art academies in Naples and Rome, as well as in Madrid's Royal Fine Arts Academy of San Fernando, where he studied under Francisco Pradilla and was inducted into the Order of Charles III, in 1887. Returning to Argentina in 1890, Caraffa relocated to Córdoba, where in 1896, he received authorization from the progressive Governor of Córdoba Province, José Figueroa Alcorta, to establish the Provincial Fine Arts Academy. Caraffa was appointed a professor at the Córdoba National University in 1900.

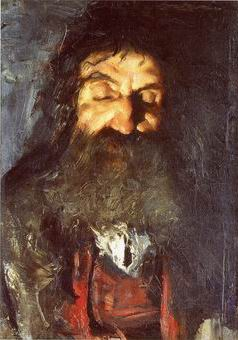
Head of a Jewish Man, oil on canvas.

His earlier works were largely landscape art, a popular genre locally, at the time; after 1900, however, his art tended towards post-impressionism - a largely overlooked genre among Argentine art patrons which Caraffa, who enjoyed strong official support, arguably helped popularize in Argentina. Among his best-known early works from this period in his career was Head of a Jewish Man, which he exhibited at the 1904 Louisiana Purchase Exposition in St. Louis, earning a silver medal. Remaining active in the Córdoba cultural sphere, he obtained funding for the province's first official art museum in 1911, and the institution opened in 1916.

Untitled, oil on canvas.

Caraffa was commissioned to lead the decoration of the ceilings of the Córdoba Cathedral, a work completed in 1914. Over time, he developed a painting style of a markedly romanticist bent, and created numerous landscapes, portraits and works of historic and religious art for government bureaus and churches. The prolific painter died suddenly in his atelier in the scenic town of La Cumbre, in 1939.

Eleven years after his death, the provincial museum he helped establish was renamed the Emilio Caraffa Provincial Fine Arts Museum. His works, besides those gracing private homes, churches and government offices, can be found in numerous Argentine museums, among them the Juan B. Castagnino Fine Arts Museum (Rosario) and the National Fine Arts Museum (Buenos Aires).
