= Emilio Pettoruti =

Argentine painter

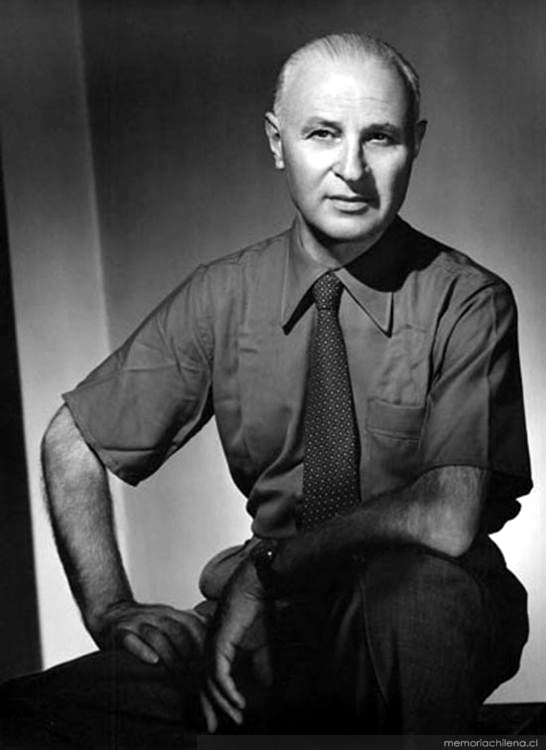
- Born: October 1, 1892; La Plata, Argentina
- Died: October 16, 1971 (aged 79); Paris, France
- Website: pettoruti.com

Emilio Pettoruti (1892–1971) was an Argentine painter, who caused a scandal with his avant-garde cubist exhibition in 1924 in Buenos Aires. At the beginning of the twentieth century, Buenos Aires was a city full of artistic development. Pettoruti's career was thriving during the 1920s when "Argentina witnessed a decade of dynamic artistic activity; it was an era of euphoria, a time when the definition of modernity was developed." While Pettoruti was influenced by Cubism, Futurism, Constructivism, and Abstraction, he did not claim to paint in any of those styles in particular. Exhibiting all over Europe and Argentina, Emilio Pettoruti is remembered as one of the most influential artists in Argentina in the 20th century for his unique style and vision.

== Biography ==
Vallombrosa (1916), oil on canvas, part of the MALBA collection.

Emilio Pettoruti was born in La Plata, on October 1, 1892, to a prosperous middle-class Italian family. Pettoruti's art would be influenced by the modern, geometric layout of the city, with the "silver color of changing tonalities." When Pettoruti was only fourteen years old, he enrolled in the local Academy of Fine Arts, only to drop out shortly after because he felt he could learn more on his own. He then studied with Emilio Coutaret, an architect, and teacher at the Drawing School in the Museum of Natural History, where he developed a style in favor of caricature portraits. It was one of these caricatures, specifically of Rodolfo Sarrat, that provided him with the means to study abroad. In 1913, he was awarded a travel scholarship to Italy, where he studied Renaissance painters in Florence, including Fra Angelico, Masaccio, and Giotto. He was strongly influenced by fourteenth-century art in Florence: "the inevitable influence of Greco-Roman art and architecture, his interest in the geometric proportion of the anonymous medieval mosaic artists, and the equilibrium of the Early Renaissance paintings he copied inevitably found their way into his own work."

While in Europe, he interacted with several European avant-garde artists and discovered the growing style of futurism. He also developed a strong friendship with the Peruvian writer Jose Carlos Mariategui which extended into a long-standing relationship. He began reading Lacerba, a Florentine futurist magazine including literature and artwork inspired by the movement. He met Futurist artists, and also exhibited at Herwarth Walden's Der Sturm Gallery in Berlin. In Paris, he met Juan Gris, who influenced him to paint in a cubist style. Of all the interests Pettoruti could have chosen to pursue, he selected art after his maternal grandfather, Josè Casaburi, discovered his potential artistic talent. In 1913, after a commission from Congressman Rodolfo Sarrat, Pettoruti traveled to Europe to study art. The theme of vertical city streets recurs in his art in 1917, in Mi Ventana en Florencia.

In Italy, Pettoruti developed a growing sense of European Modernism and studied Italian Renaissance art of the fourteenth century. In 1924, Pettoruti returned to Argentina, hoping to popularize the genre in his own country. Exhibiting both in his native country and abroad, Pettoruti was a huge success. In 1930, he was named the director of Museo Provincial de Bellas Artes in La Plata. His fame spread even to North America, and in 1942, Pettoruti visited San Francisco for his first major United States show. This show expanded Pettoruti's name, causing more museums to demand his exhibitions. Pettoruti married Maria Rosa González, who later became a subject in many of his paintings.

Pettoruti decided to step down as director of the museum, which was limited to a more conservative direction during the administration of President Juan Perón. Amid ongoing harassment and dismissals of university staff, Pettoruti returned to Europe in 1952 and continued to paint. He wrote his autobiography, Un Pintor Ante el Espejo (A Painter Before the Mirror) in Paris in 1968, and Pettoruti remained there until his death on October 16, 1971.

== Influence in Argentina ==
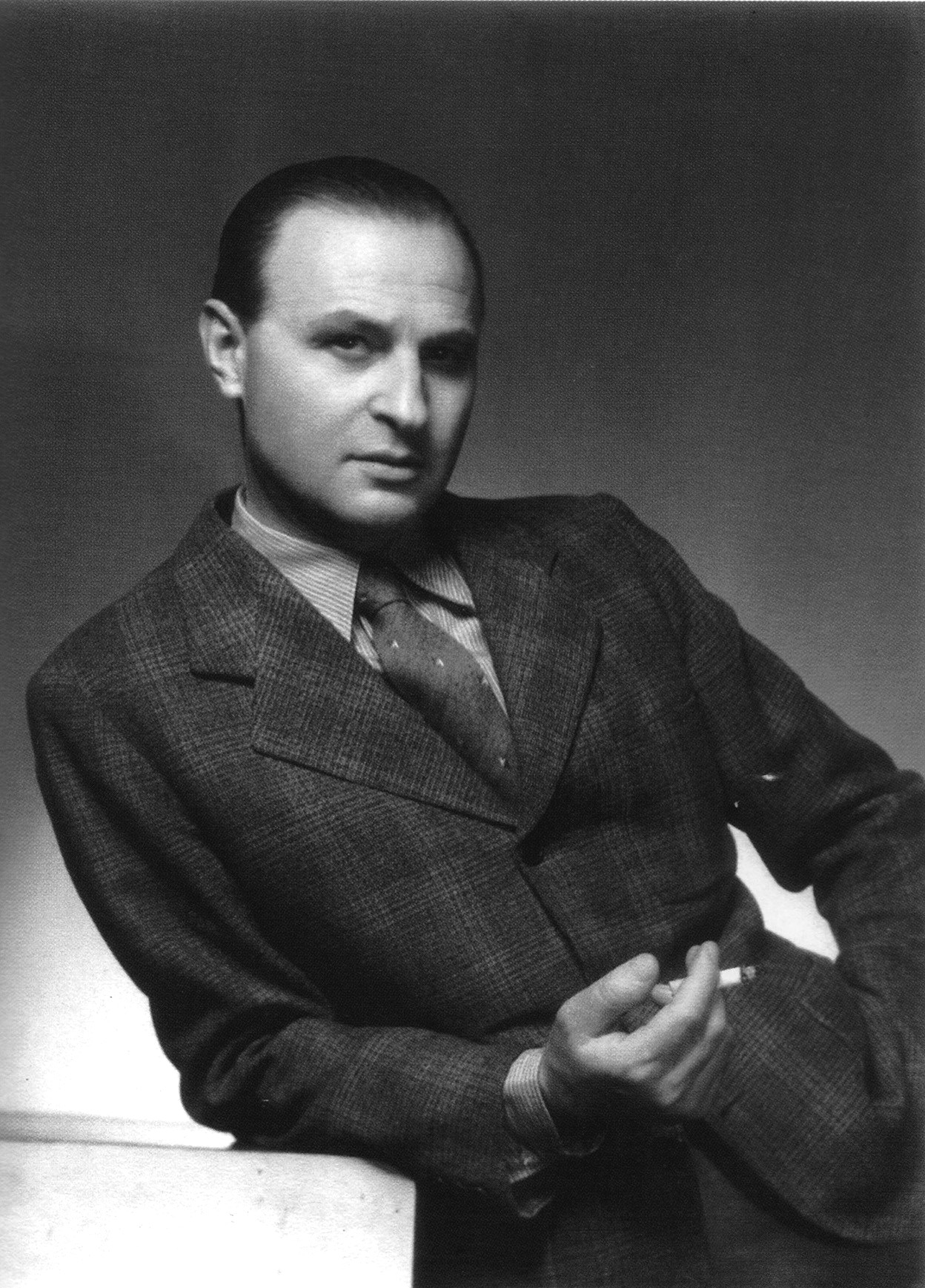
Pettoruti in the 1930s

In 1924, when Pettoruti returned to Buenos Aires, European Modernism had not yet been accepted by art critics there. His first exhibition was not widely received by conservatives, however, in regards to Pettoruti's work, his good friend Xul Solar wrote that "the Buenos Aires public can either admire or disdain him. But all will recognize his art as a great stimulating force and a point of departure for our own future artistic evolution." His work was considered shocking since "themes of gauchos, landscapes, cattle, sheep, and horses were in those days the delight of big landowners who imposed their taste in painting."

Modernism and futurism were not widely accepted. When Pettoruti arrived back in his native country, he was not unheard of, since many articles had been written specifically for local Argentine publications. The compositions created by Pettoruti "insist upon references to local, specifically Latin American, themes within a thoroughly modern, European-inspired stylistic context." Although his style developed out of his native culture, Buenos Aires adapted much more to his modern style. "He was, for Buenos Aires in the 1920s, a beacon of artistic inventiveness who opened many doors for others, both artists and the public, to enter new, uncharted territories." Pettoruti's limitless, modernist approach to the arts had an everlasting effect on the art world in Argentina.

== Style ==
Emilio Pettoruti's work was "a prototype of the modern concept of harmony, of order, and of geometric precision, near-scientific in its severity, but oscillating between the lyrical and the purely spiritual." Preoccupied with technique, light, color, and movement, Pettoruti managed to include harmony in his artworks throughout his changing phases. After witnessing Pettoruti's advance in style, Xul Solar wrote that "each stage of his development, even each technical advance, corresponds to a new stage of his soul."

The Beginning

In Pettoruti's youth, while he was discovering his potential artistic talent, he worked on drawings and caricatures of people. He created several caricatures, enough to show forty-six at the exhibition hall of the local newspaper in Buenos Aires.

Early European Period

While in Italy, Pettoruti was influenced by the growing Futurist movement, as well as the fourteenth-century Italian Renaissance. While his art reflected at different times futurist, cubist, and abstract qualities, Pettoruti "rejected any categorization of his art." He did not want himself or his artwork to be associated with any one specific movement, since he was constantly altering his style. He worked on space and shape in his compositions, considering color secondary in his paintings. Pettoruti also played around with several mediums. He spread his artistic talent to theater costumes, set designs, and stained glass windows. He became interested in mosaics, exploring the potential mosaics could have on the expansion of his ideas. Not being limited to one medium, Pettoruti incorporated various materials found in garbage dumps into his mosaic to add texture and catch the light in diverse ways. In his early years as an artist, he experimented with "deconstructing ordinary, everyday objects, reconstructing them according to his own rules, and then projecting them into his own artistic universe." This approach to art applied to all of his mediums, including mosaics and painting alike.

Later Years in Italy: Politics and Art

In 1922, Pettoruti went to Milan, where his artwork was influenced by some friends who were members of the Novecento Italiano. This group desired to represent "a 'purification' of Italian art, a re-affirmation of traditional principles in painting, sculpture, and architecture." However, Sironi and Sarfatti, two members of the Novecento Italiano, were also influential to the Fascist principles of Mussolini. Pettoruti's discomfort with the rise of Fascism perhaps influenced his decision to leave Italy and return to Argentina.

Musicians and Harlequins

Pettoruti's choice of musicians as a recurring motif in his artwork began in Europe, but he continued to represent them through the 1920s back in Buenos Aires. The musicians are either shown alone or in groups, and their eyes are always hidden. The musicians Pettoruti depicted have a cultural link, since they were "directly associated with the tango, the inimitable cultural expression of the Argentine capital." One example of this motif in his painting is Quinteto (1927), depicting five street musicians in the abstracted cubist style. In 1927, he switched from representing musicians to representing harlequins, who similarly always had their eyes covered while looking through masks. For Pettoruti, harlequins were a "useful device for representing the human figure, but as an anonymous, remote, generalized form, not as an individual." Of the many paintings Pettoruti worked on, one of his first is titled Arlequin (1928), showing one harlequin wearing a mask over his eyes and playing a musical instrument resembling an accordion.

Still Lifes

In his early still lifes, Pettoruti included several similar motifs, including bottles, glasses, and often musical instruments. He then moved to his Copa series that was "near abstraction." These compositions were "composed of bright, non-nuanced areas of color which tend to flatten out the form. The cup is observed from every possible angle, top, bottom, and sides represented simultaneously." In his later still lifes, Pettoruti focused on light, incorporating it as a "concrete element of the picture," not simply including it for illumination of the scene. His use of light is evident in many of his still lifes, like Sol Argentino (1941), where the sunlight acts as "an essential life-giving element" and is obviously a solid effect to the painting.

Abstraction

In the later years of his life, Pettoruti's style advanced towards absolute abstraction. After returning to Europe in 1952, his interest "in the effects of pattern and design" became apparent from his "dedication to geometry, with its patterns constructed from hard-edged shapes." Many of his paintings consisted of completely geometric compositions, as he "espoused a form of non-objective painting that concentrated on the communicative power of color and controlled organization of shapes." Pettoruti named these abstract works with highly romanticized names, like Winter in Paris (1955) and Summer Night (1953).

== Significant works ==
Retrato de Cleto Ciochini (1913), Ink on thin cardboard, Private Collection

El Sifón (1915), Collage, Museo Nacional de Bellas Artes, Buenos Aires

La Grotta Azzurra di Capri (1918), Oil on canvas, Private Collection, Buenos Aires

Pensierosa (1920), Oil on canvas, Córdova Iturburu, Buenos Aires

El Flautista Ciego (1920), oil on board, Private Collection, New York

La Canción del Pueblo (1927), Oil on wood, Malba Museo de Arte Latinoamericano de Buenos Aires

Quinteto (1927), Oil on plywood, Private Collection, Buenos Aires

Arlequín (1928), Oil on canvas, Museo Nacional de Bellas Artes, Buenos Aires

El Improvisador (1937), Oil on canvas, Museo Nacional de Bellas Artes, Buenos Aires

La Ultima Serenata (The Last Serenade) (1937), Oil on canvas, International Business Machines, New York

Sol Argentino (1941), Oil on canvas, Museo Nacional de Bellas Artes, Buenos Aires

Invierno en París (1955), Oil on canvas, Museo Nacional de Bellas Artes, Buenos Aires

Farfalla (1961), Oil on canvas, Museo Nacional de Bellas Artes, Buenos Aires

== Exhibitions ==
In 1915, Pettoruti did his first one-artist show at the Gonelli Gallery in Florence. He showed thirty-five works, including among others, nine drawings, fifteen paintings, and eight sketches for mosaics.

In 1923, he showed thirty-five works at the Der Sturm Gallery in Berlin, which "elicited positive criticism from several writers."

In 1924, he did his first one-artist show in Buenos Aires, at the Galeria Witcomb on Florida street. The show, considered scandalous, included eighty-six works. It was not widely accepted because modernism had not yet spread in Argentina like it had in Europe. Pettoruti considered the exposition to be a "rallying cry for those of different vision," encouraging Argentines to embrace the new artistic period.

In 1938, Pettoruti showed at the Museo Municipal de Bellas Artes in Buenos Aires at an exhibition titled "Tres Expresiones de la Pintura Contemporanea". The show included works from Pettoruti, Badii, and Spilimbergo.

In 1942, Pettoruti traveled to San Francisco for his first North American show at the San Francisco Museum of Art. The museum bought his Coparmonica (1937) and Quinteto (1927). It was an influential show for his career, since it began his spread in North America, where other museums and private collectors inquired about his work.

== Bibliography ==
- Barnitz, Jacqueline. Twentieth Century Art of Latin America. Austin: University of Texas Press, 2001.
- Estarico, Leonardo. Pettoruti. Washington D.C.: Pan American Union, 1947.
- G.L.M.M. Emilio Pettoruti of Argentina. Latin American Series, No. 2. San Francisco: San Francisco Museum of Art.
- Hodin, J.P.; Sartoris, Alberto. Paintings 1914–1959 Emilio Pettoruti: [Exhibition] April 27 to May 15. London: Molton Gallery, 1960.
- Lucie-Smith, Edward. Latin American Art of the 20th Century. 2nd ed. London: Thames and Hudson Ltd, 2004.
- Nelson, Daniel Ernest. Five Central Figures in Argentine Avant-Garde Art and Literature: Emilio Pettoruti, Xul Solar, Oliverio Girondo, * * * Jorge Luis Borges, Norah Borges. Diss. The University of Texas at Austin, 1989.
- Pacheco, Marcelo. Argentina. In Latin American Art in the Twentieth Century. Edited by Edward J. Sullivan. London: Phaidon Press Limited, 1996.
- Pettoruti, Emilio (2006). A Painter Before the Mirror. Translated by Christina Soares Gache. Buenos Aires: Stockcero. ISBN 9789871136537. OCLC 313754599.
- Pettoruti, Emilio (2004) [1968]. Un Pintor Ante el Espejo (in Spanish). Buenos Aires: Libreria Histórica. ISBN 9789872104443. OCLC 56393255.
- Sullivan, Edward J., Perazzo, Nelly. Pettoruti. Buenos Aires: Fundacion Pettoruti, 2004.
- Solar, Xul. In Readings in Latin American Modern Art. Edited by Patrick Frank. New Haven: Yale University Press, 2004.
- Tanner, Peter J. The Masked Expression: The Harlequin Figure in the Works of Emilio Pettoruti. Diss. The University of Texas at Austin, 2005.
- Patricia Artundo, with comments of Marcelo Pacheco. Emilio Pettoruti y Enrique E. Garcia. DERIVAS DE UNA AMISTAD. Edited by Fundacion Pettoruti.
- Michele GREET, "Transatlantic Encounters" Latin American artists in Paris between the wars. Page 30 Amongst the cubists. Edited by Yale University Press, New Haven and LONDON
