= Cesáreo Bernaldo de Quirós =

Argentine painter

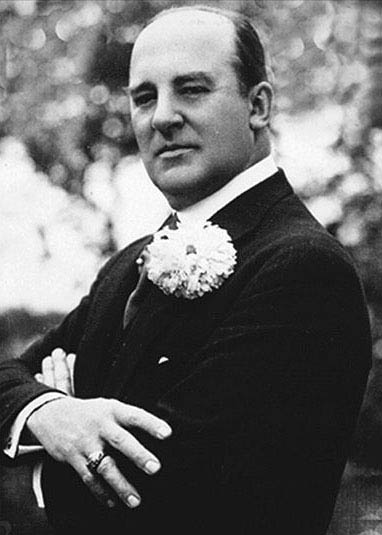
Portrait of Quirós

Cesáreo Bernaldo de Quirós (May 27, 1879 – May 29, 1968) was an Argentine painter of the Post-Impressionist school.

== Life and work ==
De Quirós was born in Gualeguay, Entre Ríos Province, in 1879. He began to paint at age eight, and shortly afterwards, created a facial composite sketch that resulted in a fugitive criminal's apprehension. De Quirós was a restless student, and often skipped classes to spend time among the area's gauchos; During one such opportunity, he witnessed a duel and, inspired by the event, created his first known painting.

His father, a Spanish Argentine immigrant from the Asturias region, became alarmed at the boy's poor attendance record at school and, following his wife's 1895 death, enrolled his son in a Buenos Aires boarding school. There, he became acquainted with visiting Spanish painter Vicente Cotanda, who gave the young artist his first formal training, and later, de Quirós was accepted into the Fine Arts Academy, where he was mentored by realist painters Ángel Della Valle and Ernesto de la Cárcova. A full scholarship from the Entre Ríos provincial government to receive further arts education in Rome was presented to the artist in 1898, though his father's own objection to the award resulted in its cancellation (Juan de Quirós, who had been recently elected city councilman in Gualeguay, objected on the belief that his son had not yet merited such an honor).

The setback proved to be temporary, however, and Cesáreo earned the Rome Prize from the Spanish Royal San Fernando Fine Arts Academy in 1899, entitling him to a three-year apprenticeship in the academy's Roman affiliate. He then relocated to Mallorca, the largest of the scenic Balearic Islands of Spain, and lived there until 1910, making brief visits to Rome for the 1905 World's Fair, to the Venice Biennale, and to Buenos Aires, where he exhibited on Florida Street alongside Pío Collivadino and Fernando Fader. The 1906 event established the Nexus Group, which popularized Post-Impressionism among Argentina's conservative clientele. María Antonelli, an unhappily married 18-year-old resident of Florence, met de Quirós during this interim, running away with him and eventually bearing him two children.

He again returned briefly to Argentina in 1910 to attend the Centennial Exposition. Exhibiting 26 works, he earned a Gold Medal for his Horse Race for the Ring on Independence Day, which drew on his childhood memories of gauchos and their ring lancing contests, and was purchased by the new Provincial Fine Arts Museum in Paraná. Increasingly well known, he purchased a villa in Settignano, Tuscany, and later, an apartment in Paris, where he regularly hosted a number of other Argentine émigrés.

The 1914 death of his estranged father, as well as the outbreak of World War I, prompted de Quirós to relocate to the family home in Gualeguay. A patron of the arts, President Victorino de la Plaza had 72 of his works added to his National Fine Arts Commission's collection in 1915, and continued success locally, in Chile and in Uruguay allowed de Quirós to purchase a large atelier facing the Palermo Rose Garden in Buenos Aires.

His marriage suffered, however, and their 1923 separation led de Quirós to purchase a secluded estancia in Entre Ríos Province. The historic property, which had belonged to the daughter of 1850s-era President Justo José de Urquiza, provided the setting for his series "the gauchos", naturalist paintings which became his best-known works, and which he exhibited and sold world-wide; his professional success was marred, however, by the loss of his daughter Carlota in the late 1920s. Purchasing a 260-hectare (650-acre) estancia near Paraná in 1938, he changed his focus towards landscape art, and in 1939, the National Fine Arts Museum exhibited and acquired a number of his works. Leopoldo Lugones, perhaps the most prominent Argentine poet of his day, considered de Quirós "our national painter".

The artist relocated in 1947 to an equestrian estate in upscale Buenos Aires suburb of Vicente López, where one of his neighbors was a close friend, Florencio Molina Campos (arguably Argentina's leading figure in naïve art). He earned a Grand Prize at the Madrid Biennale in 1951, and in 1960 married Yole Lanzelotti, a soprano. Thirty works from his series "the gauchos" were acquired by National Fine Arts Museum in 1965, and his native province awarded him with their Legion of Merit in 1967.

Two days after his 89th birthday, Cesáreo Bernaldo de Quirós died in his Vicente López home; though the planned pavilion bearing his name at the National Fine Arts Museum was never built, the Pedro E. Martínez Provincial Fine Arts Museum in Paraná created the Salón Quirós, housing the largest single collection of his works; another significant collection was established near Vicente López at the Tigre Art Museum.
