= Ricardo Supisiche =

Argentine painter and engraver

Ricardo Argentino Supisiche
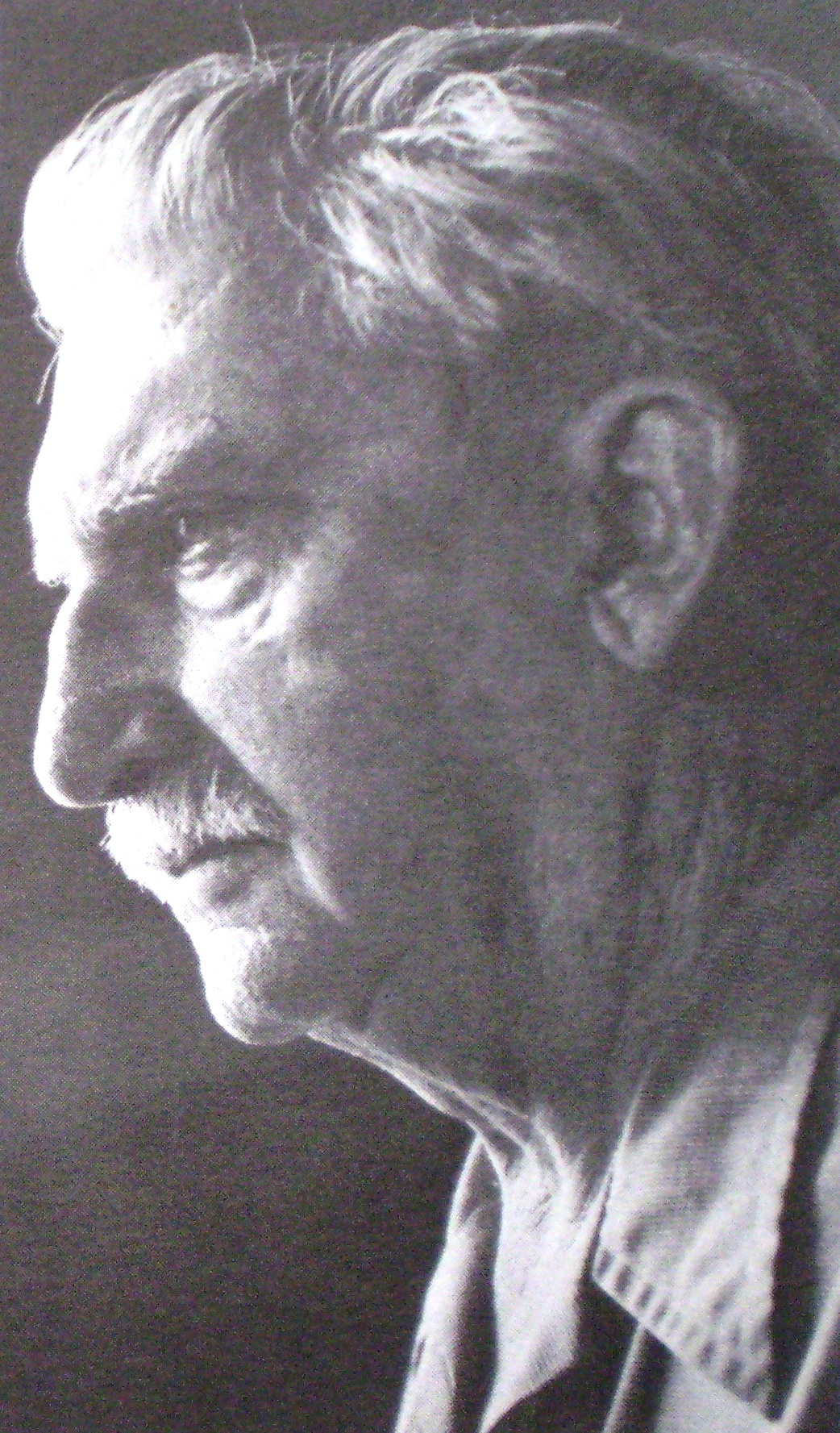
- Ricardo Supisiche
- Born: 6 November 1912; Santa Fe, Santa Fe Province, Argentina
- Died: 6 November 1992 (aged 80); Santa Fe, Argentina
- Known for: Painting, engraving
- Notable work: "Figuras en un paisaje amarillo" (1959); “Pescador”
- Movement: Litoral school; Group Setúbal (founding member)
- Awards: Multiple: Salón Nacional (Prizes Paraná, Tucumán), Salón IKA Córdoba Grand Prix, Fondo Nacional de las Artes (1962)

Ricardo Argentino Supisiche (November 6, 1912 – November 6, 1992) was an Argentine painter and engraver.

== Early life and education ==
Supisiche was born in Santa Fe, the capital of Santa Fe Province, in 1912. He began studying drawing at the age of 12 at the José María Reynares Academy in his hometown for six years, and later with master Sergio Sergi (painter and engraver) at the Liceo Municipal.

He took a course in advertising drawing at the "Leandro N. Alem" Evening Vocational School, where he discovered the importance of design. Starting in 1939, the Provincial School of Fine Arts was created, with the involvement of Gustavo Cochet, José Planas Casas, among others. Ricardo Supisiche joined immediately, drawn by José Planas Casas. He continued his studies during a trip to Europe in 1951, spending several months in Italy.

== Career ==
He was a drawing teacher at the Liceo Municipal de Bellas Artes (Municipal Lyceum of Fine Arts) and an advertising drawing instructor at the Leandro N. Alem Evening Vocational School, a position he was recommended for by Sergio Sergi. He also taught painting at the Provincial School of Fine Arts. He traveled along the entire Argentine coast for study purposes and visited Uruguay, Paraguay, Brazil, and several European countries.

He was a founding member, on May 11, 1959, along with Matías Molinas, Ernesto Fertonani, Jorge Planas Casas, and others, of the "Grupo Setúbal", based on a shared vision. They envisioned a group open to all pictorial concerns, with the aim of reaching the public's understanding and emotions.

His works are held in museums in Santa Fe, Rosario, Concordia, Paraná, Córdoba, Tucumán, La Plata, the Sívori Museum in Buenos Aires, the Municipality of Esperanza (Santa Fe), and the Pan American Union, O.A.S., in Washington, D.C., USA. He was invited to the Hispano-American Biennial in Cuba, the Palanza Prize, and by national and provincial cultural commissions and departments from Santa Fe and Tucumán. He always resided in Santa Fe. He held numerous exhibitions in various cities in Argentina and abroad: Mexico, Guatemala City, Honduras, Nicaragua, and Washington, D.C.

In addition to his own work, he taught drawing and painting techniques at several institutions.

=== Awards ===
- 1940. First prize in Composition. Sociedad de Artistas Plásticos Santafesina
- 1943. Award by Gobierno de Santa Fe. Salón Anual de Santa Fe
- 1943. Municipal Award of Santa Fe. Salón Anual del Litoral
- 1944. Honor Award, Sociedad de Artistas Plásticos Santafesina
- 1944. Award in Engraving, Gobierno de Santa Fe. Salón Anual de Santa Fe
- 1949. First prize in Drawing. Salón "Motivos de la ciudad"- Santa Fe
- 1950. Drawing Award by Dirección de Bellas Artes. Salón Anual de Santa Fe
- 1951. Award by the Ministerio de Educación y Justicia. Salón Anual de Santa Fe
- 1957. Fiat Award. Salón Anual de Córdoba
- 1958. First prize. Salón del litoral, Paraná
- 1958. Great Award. Salón Anual de Rosario
- 1959. Second prize. Salón Anual de Tucumán
- 1961. Second prize. Salón IKA, Córdoba
- 1962. Premio Fondo Nacional de las Artes. Salón Anual de Santa Fe
- 1963. First prize. Salón IKA, Córdoba
- 1963. First prize. Salón Anual de Tucumán
