= Fernando Fader =

French-born Argentine painter

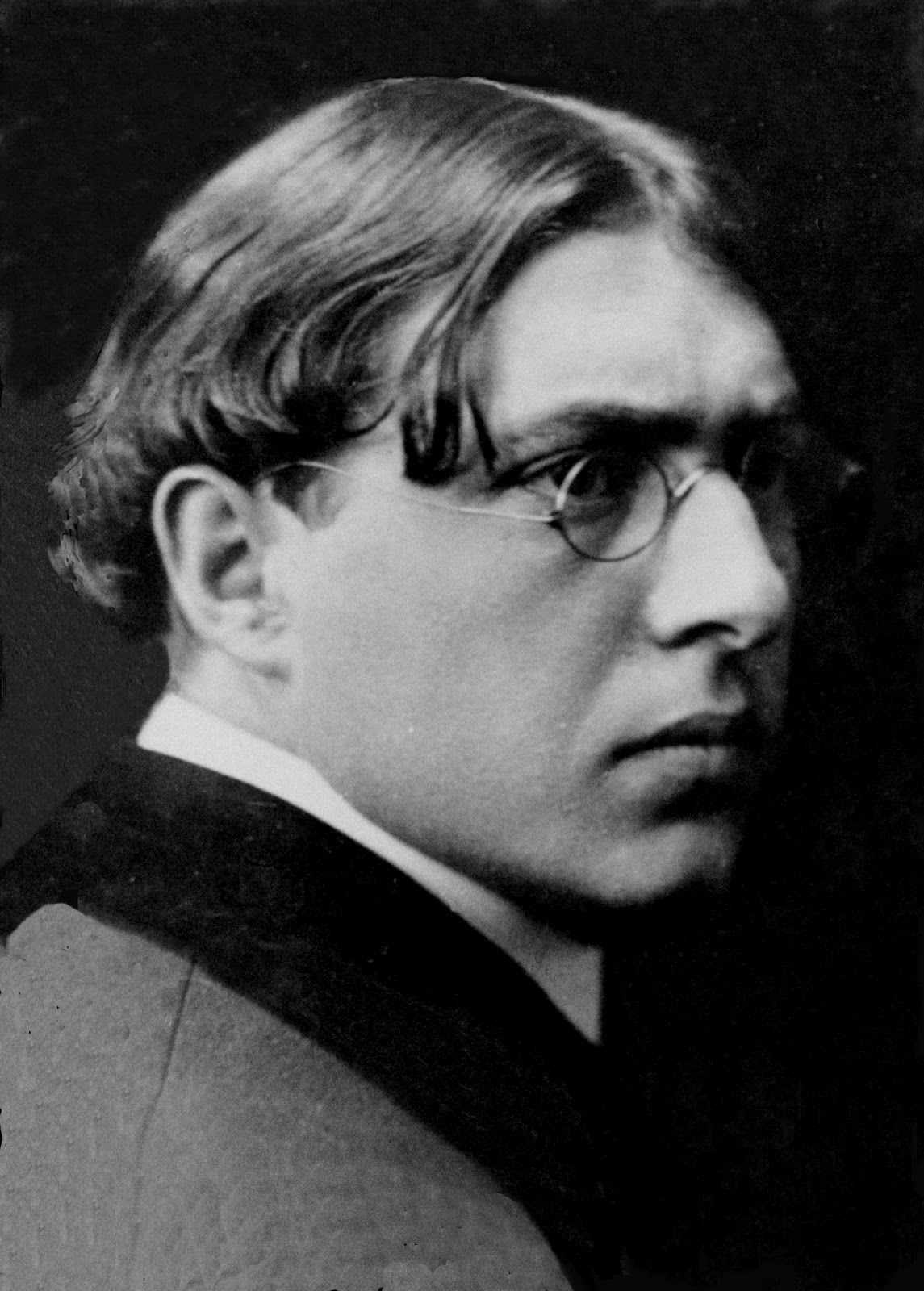
Fernando Fader in the 1910s

Fernando Fader (11 April 1882 – 25 February 1935) was a French-born Argentine painter of the Post-Impressionist school.

== Life and work ==
Fernando Fader was born in Bordeaux, France in 1882. His father, of Prussian descent, relocated the family to Argentina in 1884, settling in the western city of Mendoza before returning to France a few years later. Graduating from secondary school, Fader returned to Mendoza in 1898, where he first practiced his skill as an artist painting urban landscapes. Fader relocated to Munich in 1900, where he enrolled at a local vocational school. This training allowed him enrollment at the prestigious Munich Academy of Fine Arts, where he was mentored by Heinrich von Zügel, prominent in Europe's Naturalist Barbizon School.

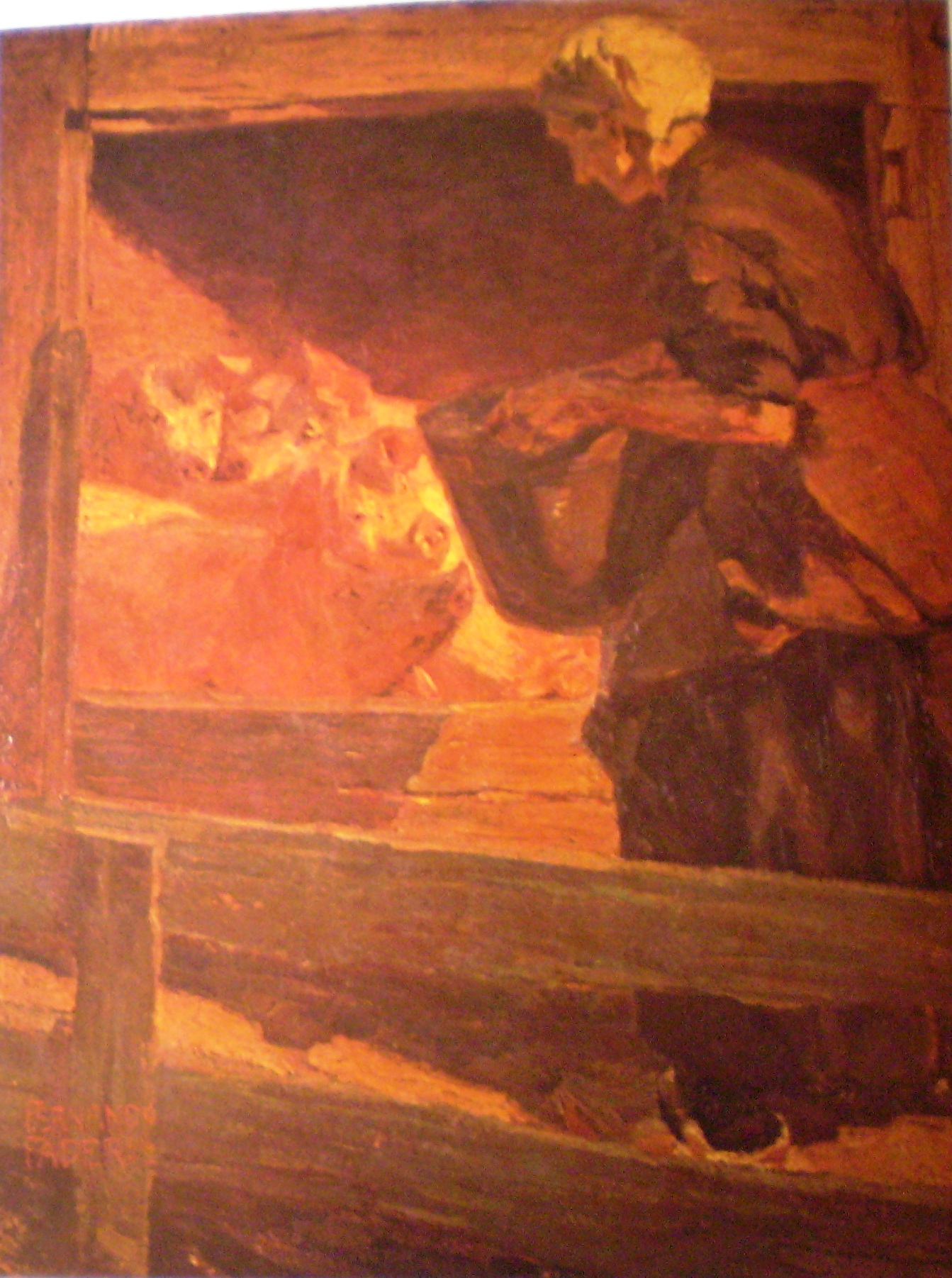
Pig Trough, oil on canvas, 1904

He returned briefly to Buenos Aires, where his work was first exhibited at the Costa Salon in 1906. His landscapes quickly established him as a Post-impressionist painter at a time when local critics were still partial to Impressionism, however, and this motivated Fader to join other artists similarly out of favor with conservative Argentine audiences, such as Cesáreo Bernaldo de Quirós, the sculptor Rogelio Yrurtia and Martín Malharro (whose earlier, impressionist work had established the genre locally in 1902).

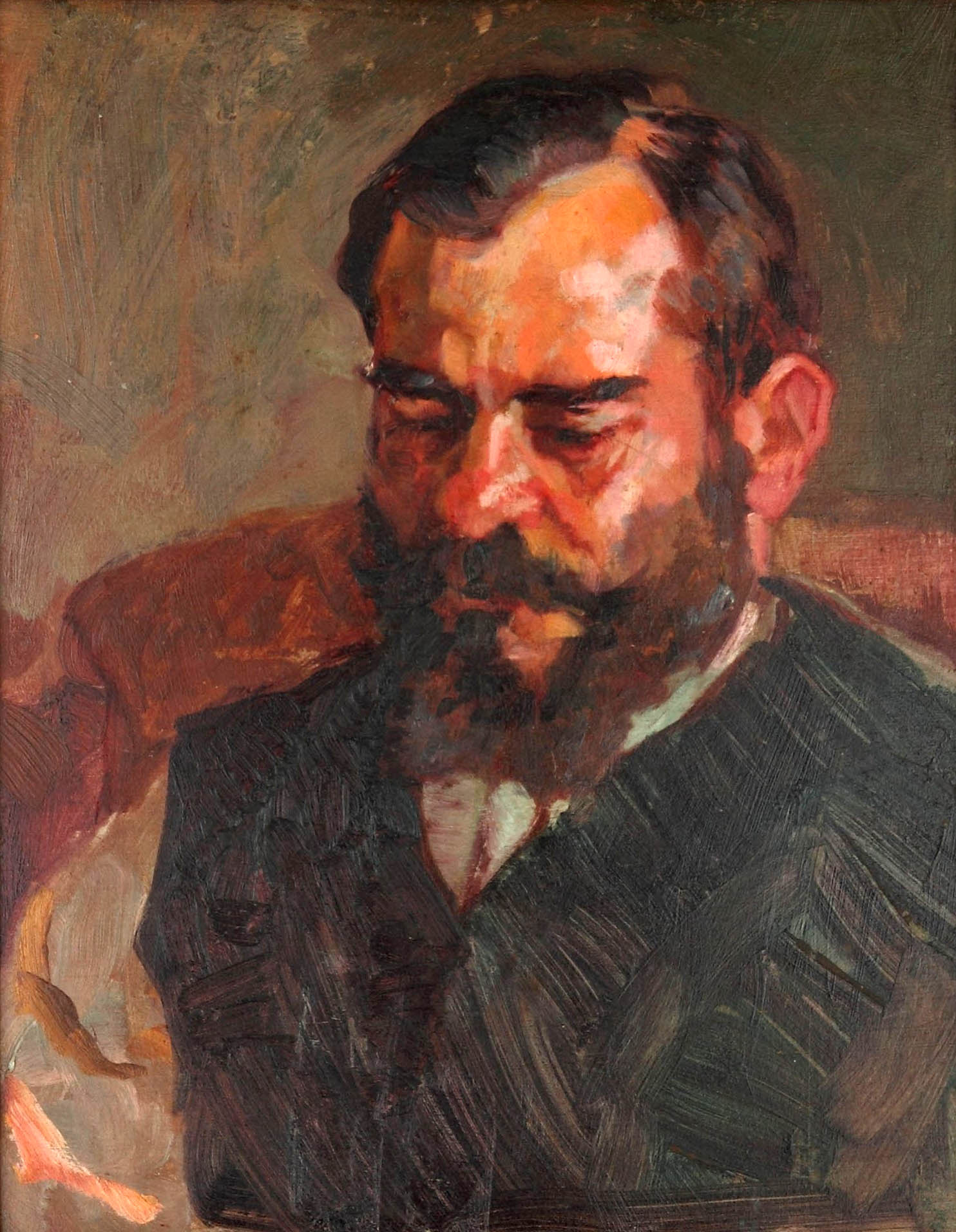
Victor Torini, oil on canvas, 1913

Their Nexus group struggled until around 1910, when Malharro's atelier became the most influential in Argentina shortly before his sudden passing. Fader settled in Buenos Aires in 1914, where he obtained a first prize at the Fourth National Art Bienale. He toured art galleries in Spain and Germany and earned a gold medal at the Pacific International Exposition in San Francisco, in 1915. An onset of tuberculosis, however, forced him to relocate to the drier climates of the Argentine Andes foothills.

His stay in Córdoba refocused his work along more Impressionistic lines, employing a greater use of sunlight contrasts. His new surroundings also gave him ample bucolic inspiration, and he created many of his most well-known works during this period, many of which romantically portrayed farm life. This productive period was cut short by a sudden worsening of Fader's breathing difficulties around 1921, which by then had become chronic asthma and precluded outdoor work. This led Fader to turn to still life, nudes and self-portraits, resulting in a third, distinct period in the artist's prolific body of work.

Though forced into reclusion by ill health, Fader never lost the following he had acquired during his heyday around 1915, and the National Academy of Fine Arts organized a retrospective of his work in 1924. The Buenos Aires community of art galleries organized a 1932 retrospective of 119 works in honor of Fader's 50 ^{th} birthday, by which time he was too ill to attend.

Fernando Fader died in Ischilín Department, Córdoba at age 52, in 1935. His former home in the rural hamlet of Loza Corral is maintained as a museum.
