= Julia Wernicke =

Argentine painter (1860–1932)

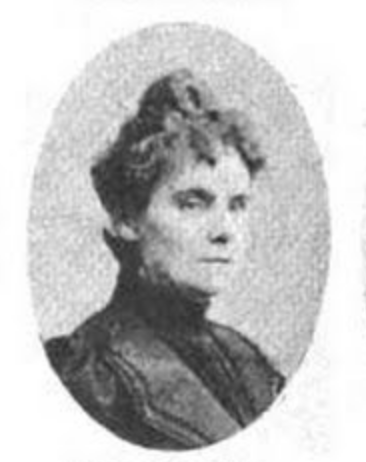
- Born: October 26, 1860; Buenos Aires, Argentina
- Died: October 25, 1932 (aged 71)
- Occupations: Painter, engraver

Julia Wernicke (August 26, 1860 – October 25, 1932) was an Argentine painter and engraver. She is known as the first animalist painter from Argentina and incorporated exotic animals into her paintings. She paved the way for female artists in Argentina through many firsts, especially within the discipline of engraving. Wernicke was one of the first women to have an individual exhibition of works in Buenos Aires, in 1897; and the first person to have an individual exhibition of engraved etchings in Argentina, in 1909.

== Family ==
Julia Wernicke was born in Buenos Aires, the daughter of respected educator Robert Heinrich (Roberto Enqrique) Wernicke (1826–1881) and his wife Ida Augusta Beltz von Hagen. Both were German immigrants. Roberto arrived in Argentina in 1848. They married in 1851 and had several children.

- Roberto Enrique Martín Wernicke (1852–1922), doctor and bacteriologist
- Ana Carlota Wernicke Beltz von Hagen (1858–1932)
- Julia Federica Herminia Wernicke Beltz von Hagen (1860–1932), artist
- María Wernicke Beltz von Hagen (1866–?), teacher
- Edmundo Wernicke Beltz von Hagen (1867–?), writer
- Otto Wernicke Beltz von Hagen (1868–?), doctor

Following Augusta's death, Robert married again, with his dead wife's sister, Federica Guillermina Beltz von Hagen. She became the step-mother of Julia and the other surviving children. Robert and Federica had a son, German Wernicke Beltz von Hagen (1873–1941), Julia's half brother.

Julia also had a half-sister, Berta Wernicke (1871–1962), a feminist writer and teacher who co-founded the Geographical Society of Argentina with Elina González Acha de Correa Morales and others.

== Career ==
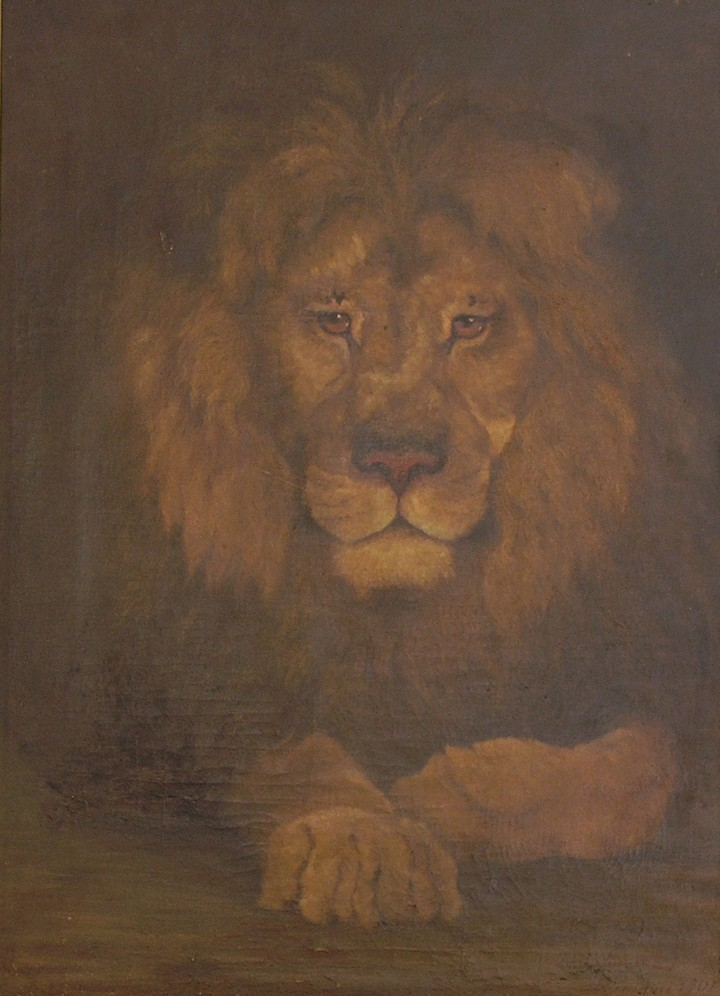
The Lion, 1901

Around 1885, at age 25, Julia Wernicke made her first visit to Europe, and spent four years studying in Munich, Germany with the animal painter Heinrich (Enrique) von Zügel (1850–1941). Zügel was a member of the Barbizon school and taught in the Academy of Fine Arts, Munich. He also taught the Argentinian artist Fernando Fader (1882–1935), German artist August Kaufhold, and U.S. artist Walt Kuhn (1877–1949). Zügel's teaching had a significant impact on Wernicke: throughout her career, she chose to paint exclusively animal paintings, which were considered a strange choice for a woman at that time.

Wernicke became known as the first animalist painter from Argentina. She painted animals from the Buenos Aires Zoological Garden, and from her travels to the countryside. Thanks to her friendship with Eduardo Holmberg - the Director of the Zoological Garden - Wernicke could gain access to the gardens and take her easel and paint brushes to paint the "exotic" animals kept there. Wernicke's representations of lions, tigers, gorillas, and other exotic animals, was unusual. While studies of domestic animals and even their natural deaths were not uncommon for artists in Argentina at the time, the representation of wild animals was exclusively explored by Wernicke. This was also a difference between her and her teacher, who specialized in paintings of the farm animals and the German countryside. Wernicke incorporated her own interests. She has been favorably compared with Rosa Bonheur.

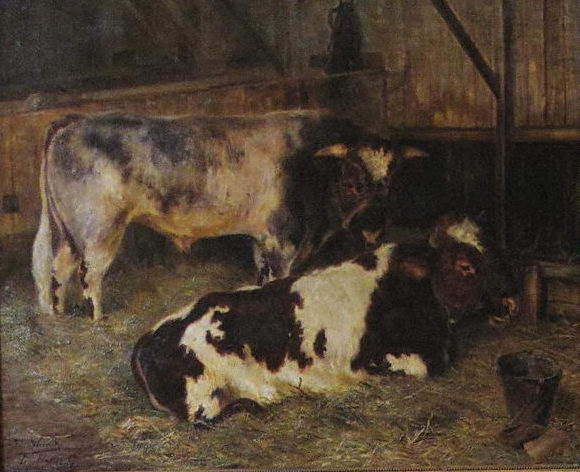
Toros or Los Toritos, 1897

Her most recognized work of art of the era was Toros, also known as Los Toritos (Oil Painting on canvas, 55.5 cm by 71 cm, 1897). It forms part of the archives at the Museo Nacional de Bellas Artes (Buenos Aires), and was exhibited both nationally and internationally.

Wernicke traveled between Argentina and Germany, eventually returning to Europe where she undertook a different course: engraved etching. She lived in Leipzig, Berlin, and Dresden and studied with Gützen, or Gӧtzen. Wernicke and the artist Catalina Mórtola de Bianchi together explored more varied technical methods: etching, woodcut, aquatint, drypoint, and lithography.

== Exhibitions ==
Beginning in the 1880s there was "an unparalleled influx of paintings and sculptures" into Buenos Aires. Although European art tended to be preferred over local artworks, artists and intellectuals organized four collective exhibitions focusing on local artists at the Buenos Aires Salón del Ateneo, or Atheneum, during the 1880s-90s. Women were well-represented in the exhibitions of the Ateneo: in 1894, 27 of 67 exhibitors were female, while in 1896 women artists were in the majority. On October 20, 1895, at 35 years of age, Julia Wernicke participated in the third exhibition of the Ateneo, which included 180 works from 71 artists (18 of whom were women).

On May 21, 1897 La Nación reported that Wernicke planned to hold workshops to give young ladies lessons in painting, drawing and portraiture. She also published her name and address in the 1988 exhibition catalogue, indicating a workshop or professional studio presence.

In 1897, Wernicke held a solo exhibition at a space owned by photographer Samuel Boote. It was exceptional for any artist in Buenos Aires to hold a solo exhibition during the first decade of the twentieth century. Wernicke's 1897 exhibition may be the first individual exhibition of works by a woman artist in Buenos Aires.

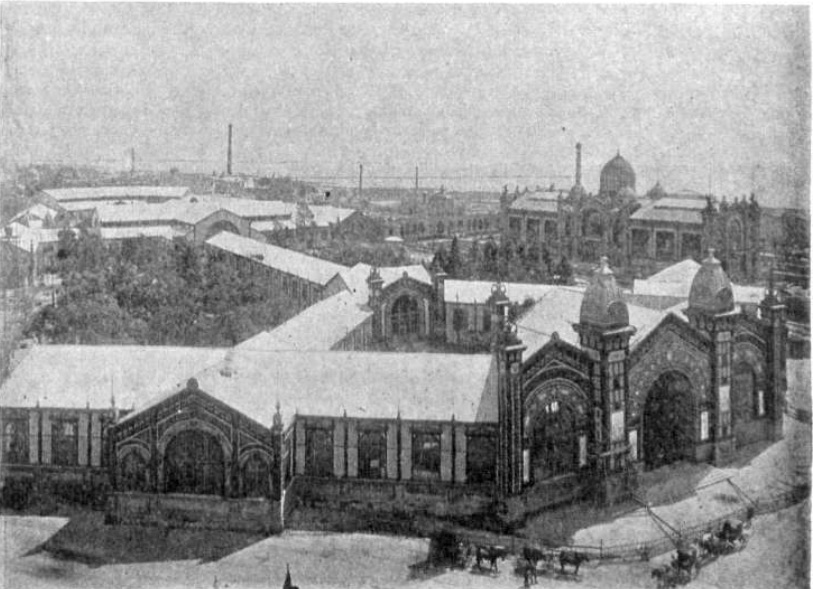
View of the buildings of the Exposición Nacional, 1898

Wernicke's work was shown at the Exposición Nacional de 1898, in the Plaza San Martín, Buenos Aires. The exposition opened on October 16, 1898, and closed on November 20. Taking as a model the Woman's Building at the World's Columbian Exposition in Chicago, 1893, Argentine women created a Sección Feminista (Feminist Section) for the productions of women. With the leadership of Teodelina Alvear de Lezica, fifteen hundred objects were presented to public view in the Feminist Exhibition, including embroidery, lace-making, weaving, furniture, and painting on a variety of media. Including both the fine and applied arts, the event was presented as educational and empowering for Argentine women. Julia Wernicke presented work both in the feminist section and in the professional exhibit of the Ateneo. She received a silver medal, 1898–99.

Wernicke was one of only two women artists, of those who participated in exhibits at the Ateneo, whose works were included in the collection of the Museo Nacional de Bellas Artes (MNBA). The other woman to be included was her friend Elina Gonzalez Acha. Wernicke's Toros was purchased in 1899 by Eduardo Schiaffino, the MNBA's founder and first director. From its acquisition until the painting was retired to be guarded in the museum's depository (around 1950), Toros occupied a preeminent place with the other works of art now considered to be of national significance. During the latter 20th century Toros was not displayed in the museum and it was not included in the catalogue raisonné.

In December 1899, Julia Wernicke and Arturo Méndez were considered equally qualified in age and artistic merit when considered for a scholarship for landscape painting. Eduardo Schiaffino argued against awarding the scholarship to Julia Wernicke on the grounds that being female made Wernicke necessarily inferior: "su diferencia de sexo establece una inferioridad de parte del concurrente femenino." The scholarship went to Méndez. A third contender, Marcelino Barneche, was awarded a similar scholarship later on.

Nonetheless, Wernicke's work was chosen by Schiaffino as one of those to represent Argentina at the international Saint Louis Exposition of 1904, on loan from the National Museum of Fine Arts. Wernicke was awarded a bronze medal by the Exposition. Other medal-winners in the show included the painter Eduardo Sívori (1847–1918) and the sculptor Lucio Correa Morales (1852–1923).

Baedeker's review of Bulls is generally complimentary but also exposes highly gendered views of women artists, who were expected to be introspective, delicate and subtle.

Julia Wernicke (1860), Argentine, Bulls. Nobody would think that this beautiful study, solid and energetic, is the work of a woman; the appearance of the hair of the animals is very exact, but it is not the same with the back ground of the picture, which is negligent and conventional, the tones are worthy of a master.-Baedeker of the Argentine Republic, 1914

Again in 1909, Wernicke held a solo exhibition, this time at the Galería Witcomb. Wernicke created the first individual exhibit of engraved etchings to be presented in Argentina, in Buenos Aires. However this innovation was not understood by the porteño media. The artist left Argentina and lived for much of the rest of her life in Germany.

In 1926, Lía Correa Morales, daughter of Lucio Correa Morales and Elina González Acha de Correa Morales, went to Germany, where she studied art with Julia Wernicke. Mira Schor notes that their association has been largely ignored and Wernicke has been dropped from accounts of the younger artist's "linaje paterno". Correa Morales married sculptor Rogelio Yrurtia in 1936, and the Yrurtia Museum in the Belgrano neighborhood became the home of their joint collections. Correa Morales influenced the museum for many years as a painter, donor, and director, and included the works of herself, Julia Wernicke and other women artists in exhibits and in catalogs.

Julia Wernicke was the only woman artist to be included in the exhibition A Century of Art in Argentina, at the National Directorate of Fine Arts in 1936.

Wernicke's works were also acquired by the Museo Castagnino of Rosario when it opened in 1937 under director Hilarión Hernández Larguía. Works were donated to the new museum by many private and public figures, collectors and artists. Several of Wernicke's works were donated posthumously to the collection by members of her family.

== Critical responses ==
Like other women artists, Wernicke's career has not been deeply studied. She was recognized as an artist in her own time. Museum director Eduardo Schiaffino considered her work good enough to be shown in the National Museum and to be chosen to represent Argentina in international competitions. However, he did not include her or other women in the published first volume of his influential general history of Argentine art, published in 1933. Wernicke and other women were relegated to the draft of his second volume, which was never published. It is also clear that this reflected a bias on his part against women artists, who he considered inferior.

Carlos P. Ripamonte, writing of Argentinian artists in 1930, recognized Wernicke as a pioneer, both as a professional artist and as an art teacher.

Wernicke was discussed by José León Pagano in El arte de los argentinos (1937). Pagano ranked her as an artist, not an amateur. But even when allowed the possibility of genius, both she and her works were expected to fit a set of highly gendered expectations.

In the 1950s and 1960s, Bernardo González Arrili praised Wernicke both for the quality of her work, and for doing work that did not fit the expectations of the time for women artists. He laments that she had to battle against disinterest and incomprehension. Wernicke is mentioned in passing in other accounts, and is being critically reassessed by 21st-century academics, who are interested in both her work and the ways in which she and other artists were marginalized by critics, academics and institutions.

Georgina Gluzman discusses changing attitudes to women artists in the fin-de-siècle period in Argentina and the ways in which female participation in the arts was connected to ideas of modernity and progress. She also examines the effect that systemic processes of obliteration have had on Wernicke and other Argentine women artists such as Eugenia Belin Sarmiento. Gluzman is curating a 2019 exhibition focusing on works by women artists in the Fine Arts museum's reserve collections, including Wernicke's Toros.
