= Francisco Cafferata =

Argentine sculptor

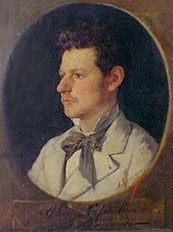
Francisco Cafferata; portrait by Augusto Ballerini (c.1882)

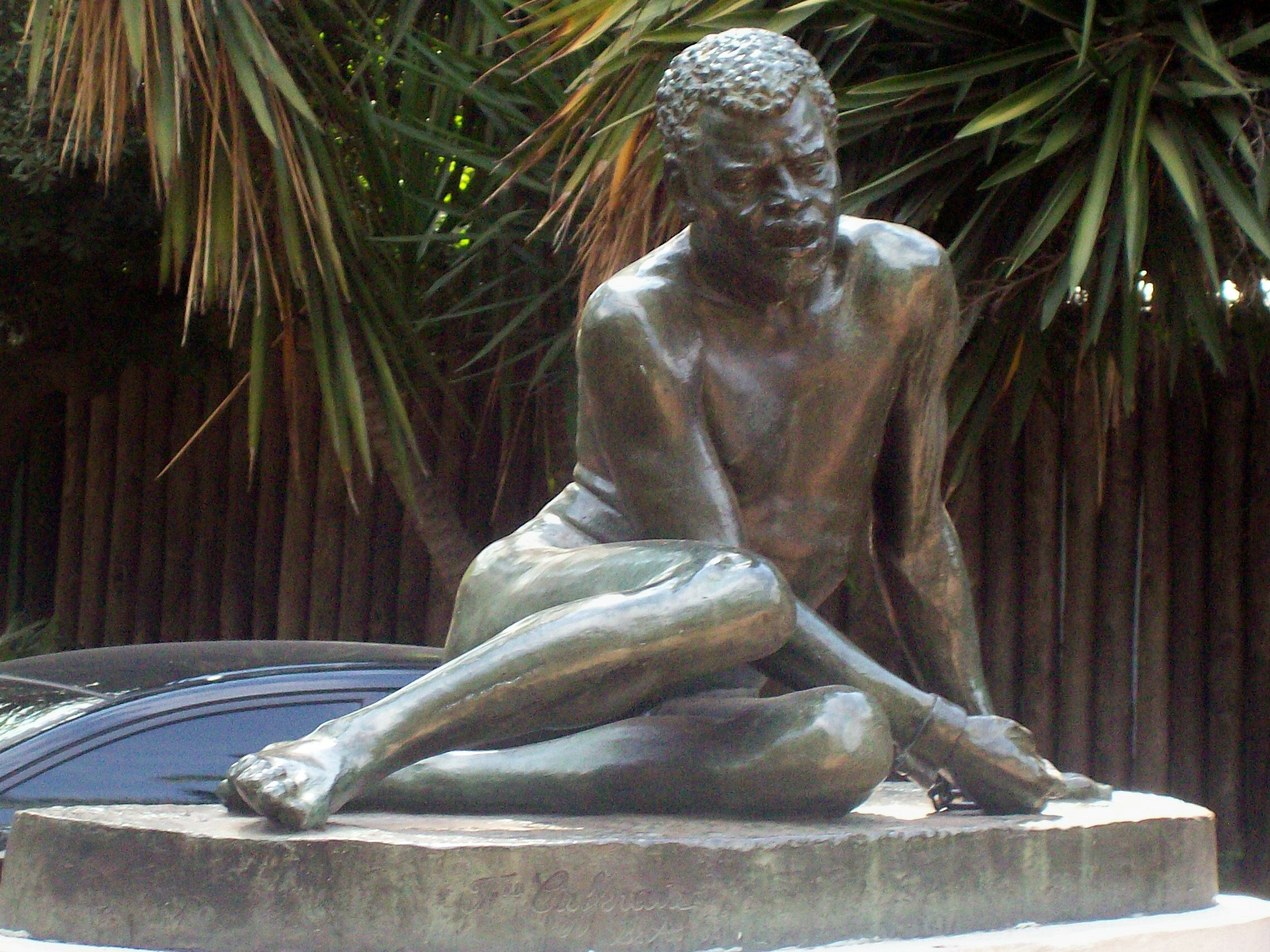
Slavery

Francisco Cafferata (28 February 1861, Buenos Aires - 28 November 1890, Buenos Aires) was one of the first significant Argentine sculptors.

== Biography ==
He was born to an Italian immigrant family. In 1877, after taking lessons from a local art teacher, he went to Florence, Italy, where he lived for eight years. While there, he studied with the sculptors Augusto Passaglia and Urbano Lucchesi.

His first showing was in 1882 at the salon of Adriano Rossi, where he displayed a statue of General Manuel Belgrano. It was later presented to President Julio Argentino Roca as a gift. He also executed his first major sculpture, "La Esclavitud" (Slavery), which was awarded a gold medal at the South American Continental Exhibition in Buenos Aires. It is now on display in the Parque Tres de Febrero.

Upon returning home in 1885, he created a monument to Admiral Guillermo Brown, which was inaugurated in 1886, in the suburb of Adrogué. It was the first major monument produced by a native-born Argentinian. He also created several commemorative portrait busts, including those of the statesmen Bartolomé Mitre, Mariano Moreno and Bernardino Rivadavia, as well as the poet, José de Espronceda, and the painter, José Bouchet. He contributed three works to an exposition organized by the Sociedad Damas De La Misericordia at the Buenos Aires Stock Exchange in 1887.

In November 1890, he committed suicide. His motivation for doing so is apparently unknown. His monument to the revolutionary soldier, Falucho, a commission he had won in a competition, was left unfinished. It was completed, with various modifications, by the sculptor, Lucio Correa Morales, and is now generally credited to him.

Some of his smaller works may be seen at the Museo Nacional de Bellas Artes, the Juan B. Castagnino Fine Arts Museum in Rosario, the National Historical Museum, and the Museo Benito Quinquela Martín.

== Sources ==
- Biography, Centro Virtual de Arte Argentino @ Centro Cultural Recoleta
- Vicente Osvaldo Cutolo, Buenos Aires: Historia de las calles y sus nombres, Elche, 1988 ISBN 978-950-9921-20-7
