= Chiachio & Giannone =

Argentinian art collective

Leo Chiachio
- Born: 1969 (age 56–57); Banfield, Buenos Aires, Argentina
- Website: https://www.chiachiogiannone.com/

Daniel Giannone
- Born: 1964 (age 61–62); Cordoba, Argentina
- Website: https://www.chiachiogiannone.com/

Leo Chiachio and Daniel Giannone, better known as Chiachio & Giannone (born in 1969 and 1964 respectively), are a gay art collective from Argentina.

== Biography ==
Chiachio was born in Buenos Aires, Argentina, in 1969, while Daniel Giannone was born in Cordoba, Argentina in 1964. They met at a friend's house in 2003 and have collaborated on art ever since. Their artwork is primarily fabric-based textiles and embroidery, with the occasional gouache painting. Their aim is to replicate the principals of painting, but by using thread.

As a gay art collective, Chiachio & Giannone have held several LGBT projects to advocate for the community. Most involve community members contributing a piece of cloth with an encouraging message, which is then sewn into a larger project or mosaic. These mosaics have been displayed in several cities, most notably the Celebrating Diversity flag, which traveled from Argentina to Long Beach, California.

== Education ==
Leo Chiachio studied studio art at the National School of Fine Arts "Prilidiano Pueyrredon" and at the Superior School of Fine Arts “Ernesto de La Cárcova”.

== Community projects ==
Chiachio and Giannone have hosted a number of participatory art projects and community events intended to celebrate and promote the LGBT community.

=== LATINX Flag Project ===
Workshops were held at the Museum of Contemporary Art in San Diego, California; at The Front Arte & Cultura in San Ysidro, California; and at The Studio Door in San Diego, California in 2020. In these workshops, participants were given a piece of reused cloth that came in the color of the trans flag or the pride flag, which they then decorated with encouraging messages, notably LGBT and Latino acceptance messages. The pieces were then sewn together by Chiachio & Giannone into a large mosaic, with the text LATINX written over it.

=== Celebrating Diversity Project ===
This project that took place at Chiachio & Giannone's Museum of Latin American Art residency from March to May 2019. The artwork is a 120-foot long flag made of textile, and consists of messages from over 3,500 people in the LGBT community. The aim was to have the participants decorate a piece of cloth with symbols, words, or phrases that reflect the meaning of diversity and acceptance. The banner was later exhibited at the Long Beach Pride Parade and at the Pride at the Port event in San Pedro, California.

== Collections ==
Chiachio & Giannone's art is in the permanent collections of several museums, including in the Buenos Aires Museum of Modern Art, the Museum of Contemporary Art of Rosario, the Caraffa Fine Arts Museum, and at the Juan B. Castagnino Fine Arts Museum.

== Exhibitions ==
Group Shows
Exhibition Name	Organizer	Country	Dates	Ref
Queer Threads: Crafting Identity and Community	Maryland Institute College of Art	United States	January 17, 2014 - March 16, 2014	
New Territories: Laboratories for Design, Craft and Art in Latin America	Museum of Arts and Design	United States	November 4, 2014 - April 5, 2015	
Queer Threads: Crafting Community and Identity	Maryland Institute College of Art	United States	December 11, 2015 - March 13, 2016	
El Ardid del Tiempo: On the Textile Contemporary Paradigm	Museum of Fine Arts of Salta	Argentina	July 22, 2016 - October 8, 2016	
Threads of Connection	Bernice Steinbaum Gallery	United States	January 9, 2017 - March 31, 2017	
Chiachio & Giannone: Celebrating Diversity	Museum of Latin American Art	United States	March 17, 2019 - August 4, 2019	
Threaded Memory	De Buck Gallery	United States	June 18, 2020 - August 28, 2020	
DRIVEN: A Latinx Artist Celebration	Museum of Latin American Art/Hyundai	United States	October 1, 2020 - October 4, 2020	

Solo Shows
Exhibition Name	Organizer	Country	Dates	Ref
Entre la Luna y el Sol	Provincial Museum of Fine Art Dr. Juan R. Vidal Corrientes	Argentina	July 22, 2015	
Chiachio & Giannone: Guardianes de lo sagrado	Museum of Contemporary Art of UNL	Argentina	June 2016	
Inventar el Mundo	Municipal Art Museum Dr. Urbano Poggi	Argentina	September 2017	
Arqueología Suave	Ruth Benzacar Art Gallery	Argentina	September 27, 2017 - November 4, 2017	
Familia a Seis Colores	Cultural Center Kirchner	Argentina	June 2018	
Camp de Entrecasa	Carrafa Fine Arts Museum	Argentina	March 22, 2018 - May 24, 2018	
Comrades in Shanghai	Swatch Art Piece Hotel	China	July 24, 2018 - September 29, 2018	
Artist-in-Residence: Chiachio & Giannone	Lux Art Institute	United States	January 25, 2020 - March 21, 2020	
