= Ángel Della Valle =

Argentine painter (1852–1903)

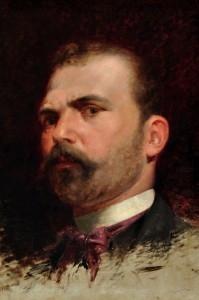
Self-portrait (unfinished, 1903?)

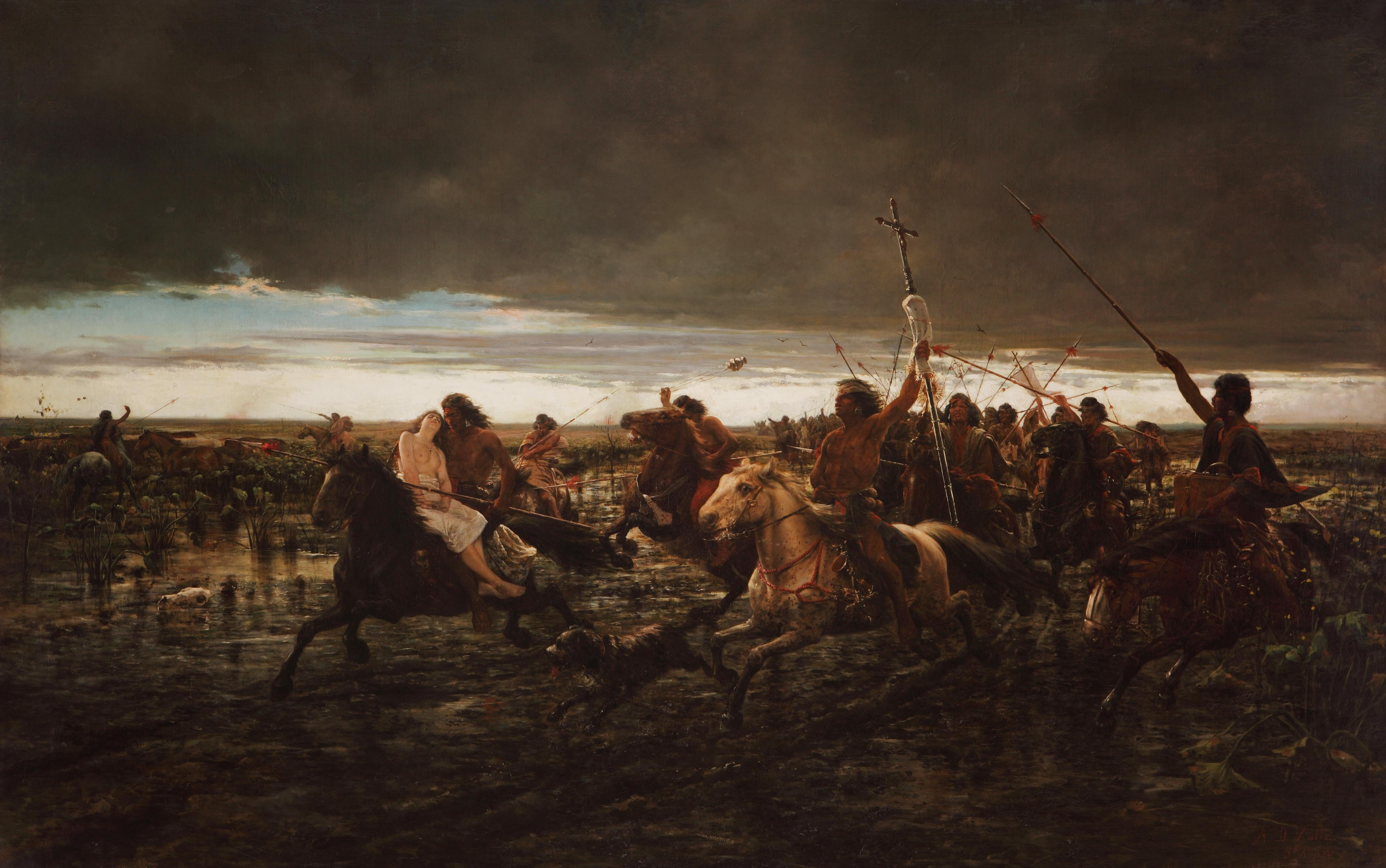
The Return of the Malón (1892)

Ángel Della Valle (10 October 1852, Buenos Aires – 16 July 1903, Buenos Aires) was an Argentine painter in the Realistic style who belonged to the "Generation of '80".

== Biography ==
He was born to an Italian immigrant family. His father was a construction manager, who worked on several major projects and was able to enroll Ángel at the Colegio San José, a prestigious private school. He displayed an early aptitude for art and, although his father died in 1871, the following year, with the consent of his mother, he was able to go to Italy, where he studied with Antonio Ciseri in Florence.

He returned to Argentina in 1883, set up a workshop in the family home and soon became identified with a group of artists who would later become the founders of "El Ateneo", an artistic salon that also involved writers and musicians. These artists included the painters Augusto Ballerini, Eduardo Sívori, Ernesto de la Cárcova and Reinaldo Giudici, as well as the sculptors Lucio Correa Morales and Francisco Cafferata. In 1893, this group began Argentina's first regular art exhibitions.

At first, he concentrated on portraits. Among the best-known are those of his childhood friend, Dr.Pedro Lagleyze (1855-1916), a prominent ophthalmologist, and one of his patients, President Julio Argentino Roca.

Overall, however, his best works are considered to be those depicting the countryside, the gaucho, and scenes of daily life among the common people. In 1892, he produced what is probably his most famous painting "The Return of the Malón". The following year it was exhibited in the Argentine pavilion at the World's Columbian Exposition in Chicago.

He also taught at the "Sociedad de Estímulo de Bellas Artes" (SEBA), founded in 1876 to be the nation's primary source for art instruction, remaining there as a drawing teacher for eighteen years. The school occupied the upper floors of a department store, now known as the Galerías Pacífico.

Eventually, he devoted more of his time to developing young artists than he did to painting. He died suddenly, while teaching in his classroom. One of his students, Thibon de Libian, made a drawing of Valle's last moments.
