= Museo Casa de Rogelio Yrurtia =

Art museum in Buenos Aires, Argentina

Coordinates: 34.5572°S 58.4554°W

- House of Rogelio Yrurtia Museum
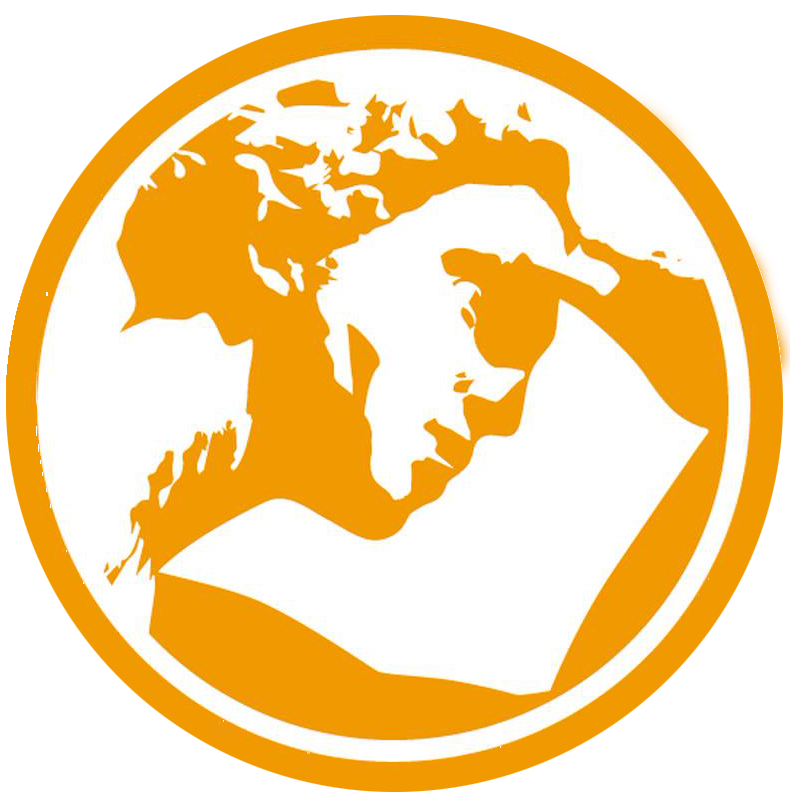

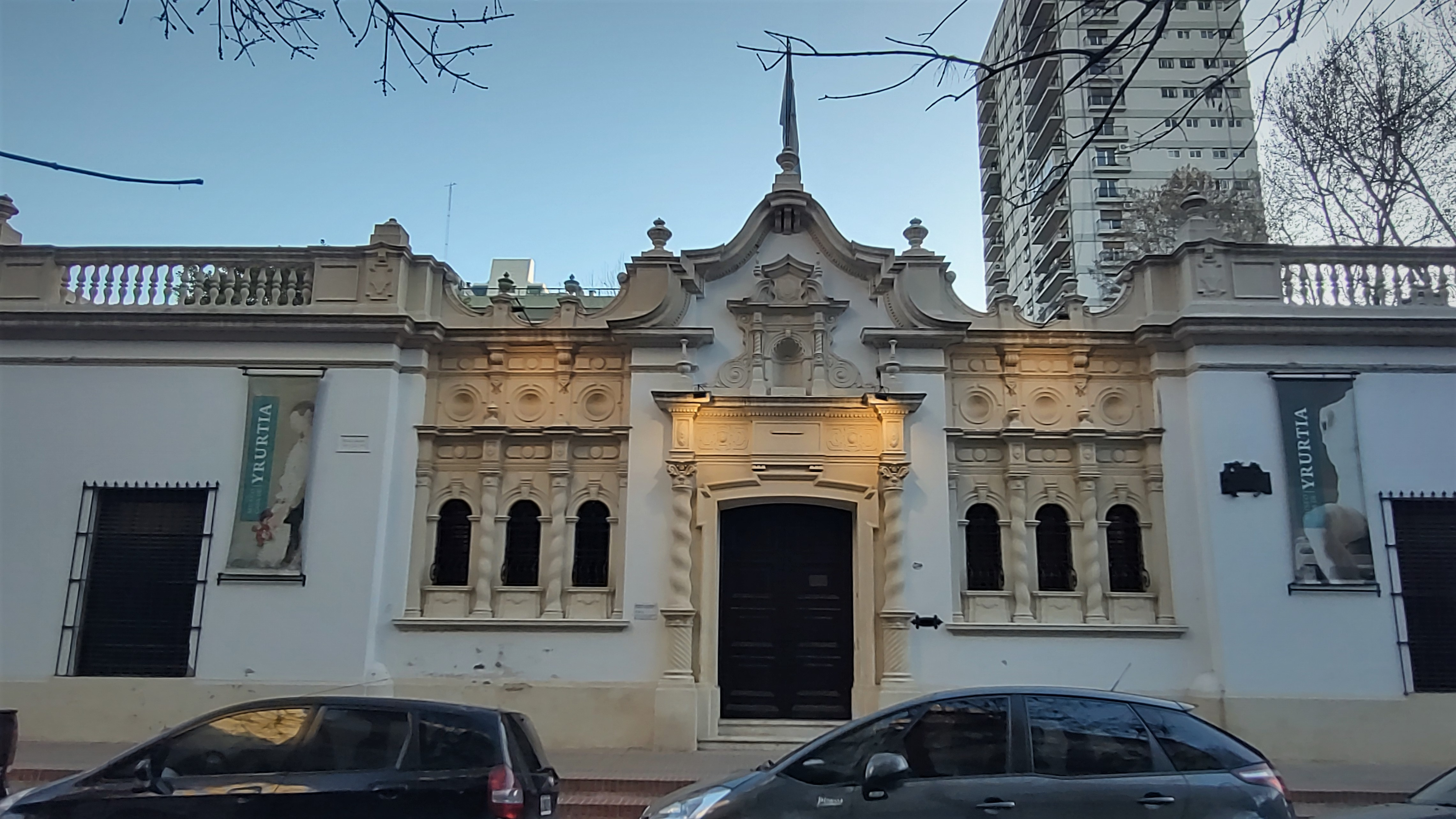
- Main facade of the museum as seen in 2022
- Established: 1949; 77 years ago
- Location: Belgrano, Buenos Aires
- Type: Art museum
- Website: museoyrurtia.cultura.gob.ar

The House of Rogelio Yrurtia Museum (Spanish: Museo Casa de Rogelio Yrurtia) was the home of the sculptor Rogelio Yrurtia and is located in the Belgrano district of Buenos Aires.

== History ==
In 1942, by law 12.824, sculptor Rogelio Yrurtia and his wife, the painter Lia Correa Morales (1893-1975), transferred his home and its assets to the government. It opened to the public as a museum in 1949.

In 1923, the house was awarded a municipal architecture prize. The style chosen by Yrurtia was, according to the neo-colonial appreciation of the Hispanic tradition, popular among the intellectuals of the time.

The works of art collected by Yrurtia along his travels resulted in a varied and diverse collection, all of them displayed in different rooms of the house, together with the works of the master and his wife: sculptures, bronze portraits, sketches and studies for his major works. Among the paintings are works by Martín Malharro, Eduardo Sívori, Ángel Della Valle and Benito Quinquela Martín, highlighting an early work of Pablo Picasso that Yrurtia acquired in Paris.

The collection also includes rugs, carpets, ceramics as well as household items (cups, plates, kettles, soup, candles, etc.) from Europe and Asia.

The furnishings are of different styles and origins: British Empire, French and Flemish Renaissance, which predominates.

== Gallery ==
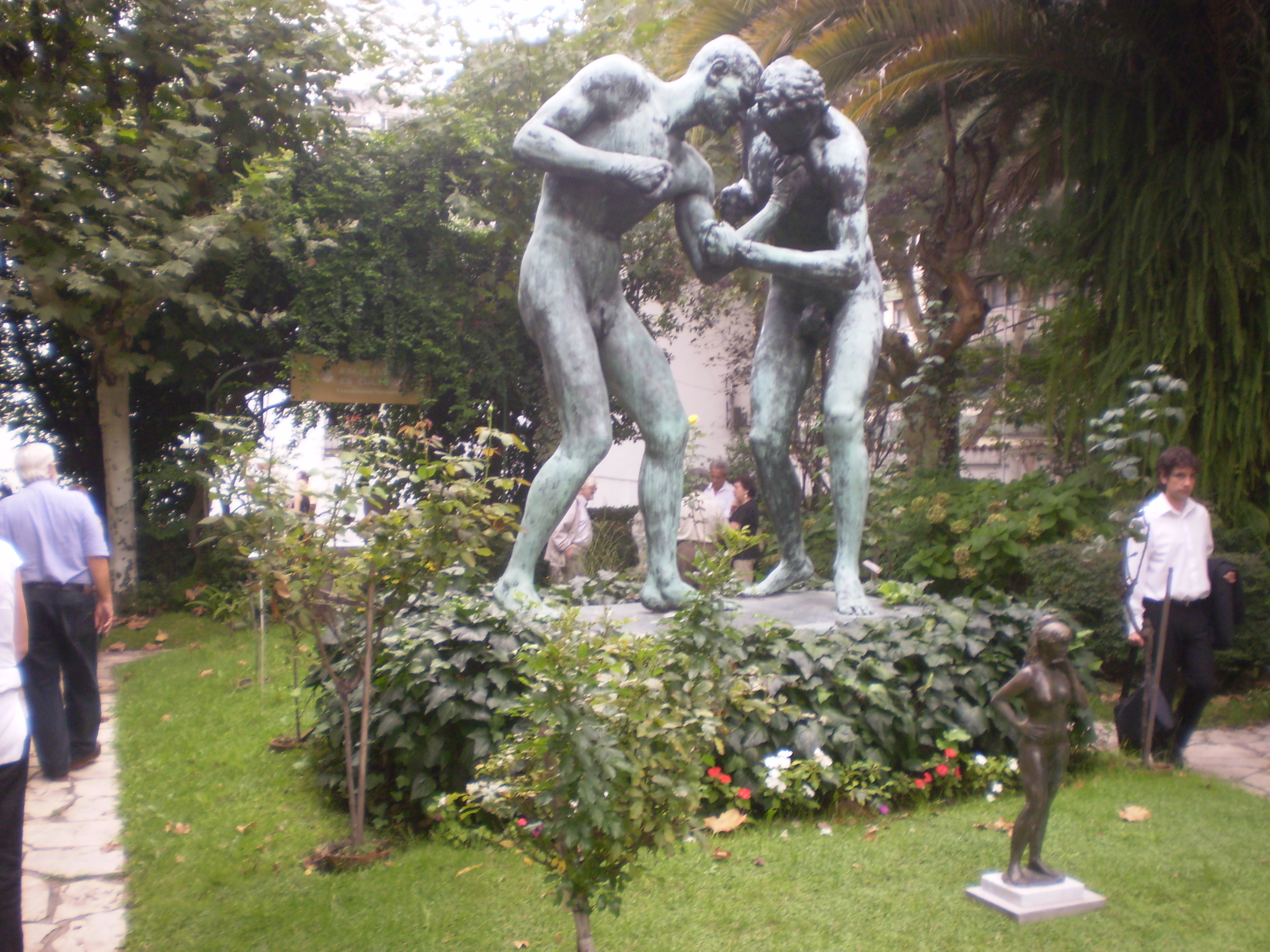
Interior garden

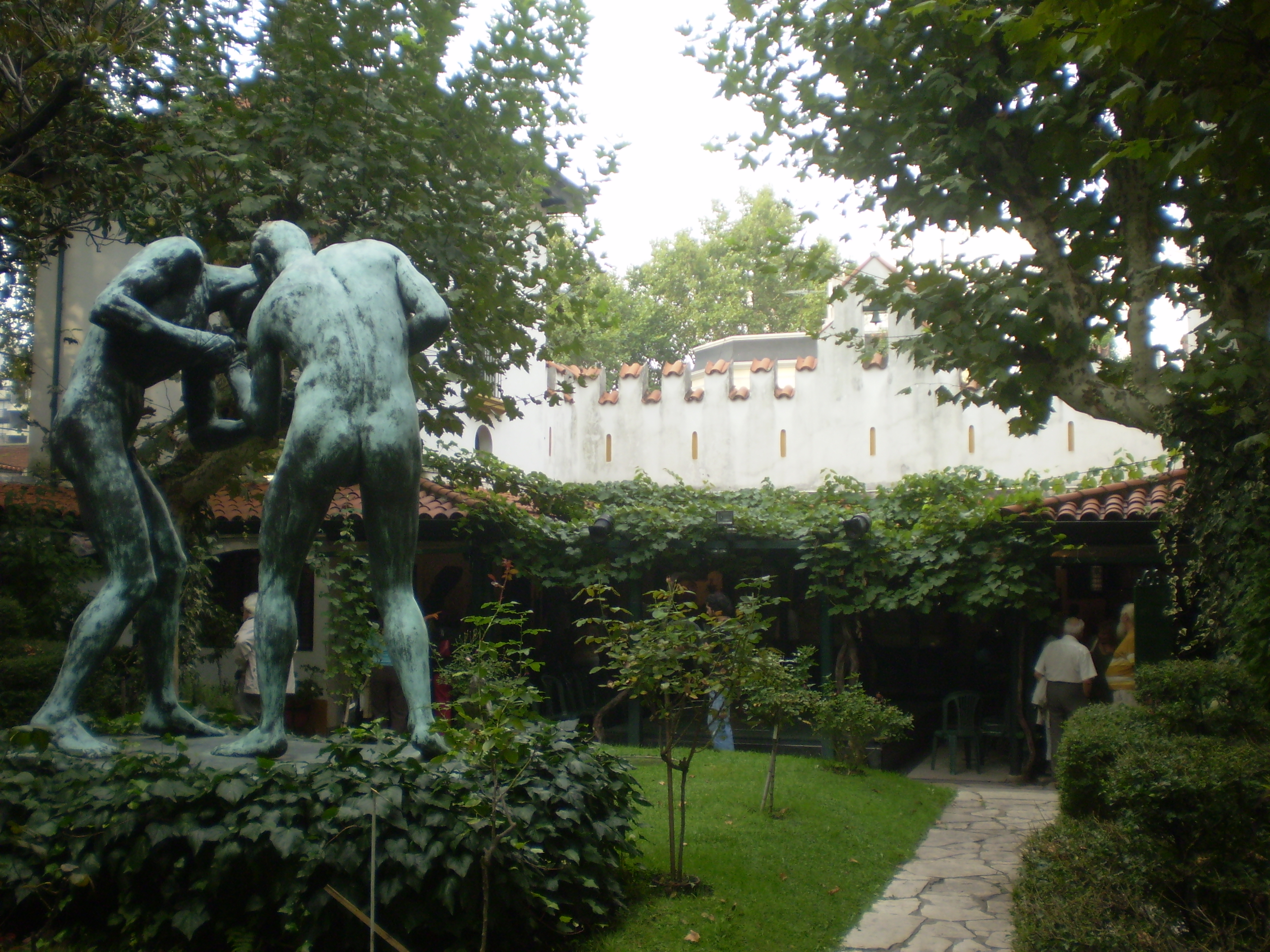
Interior garden
(from other side)

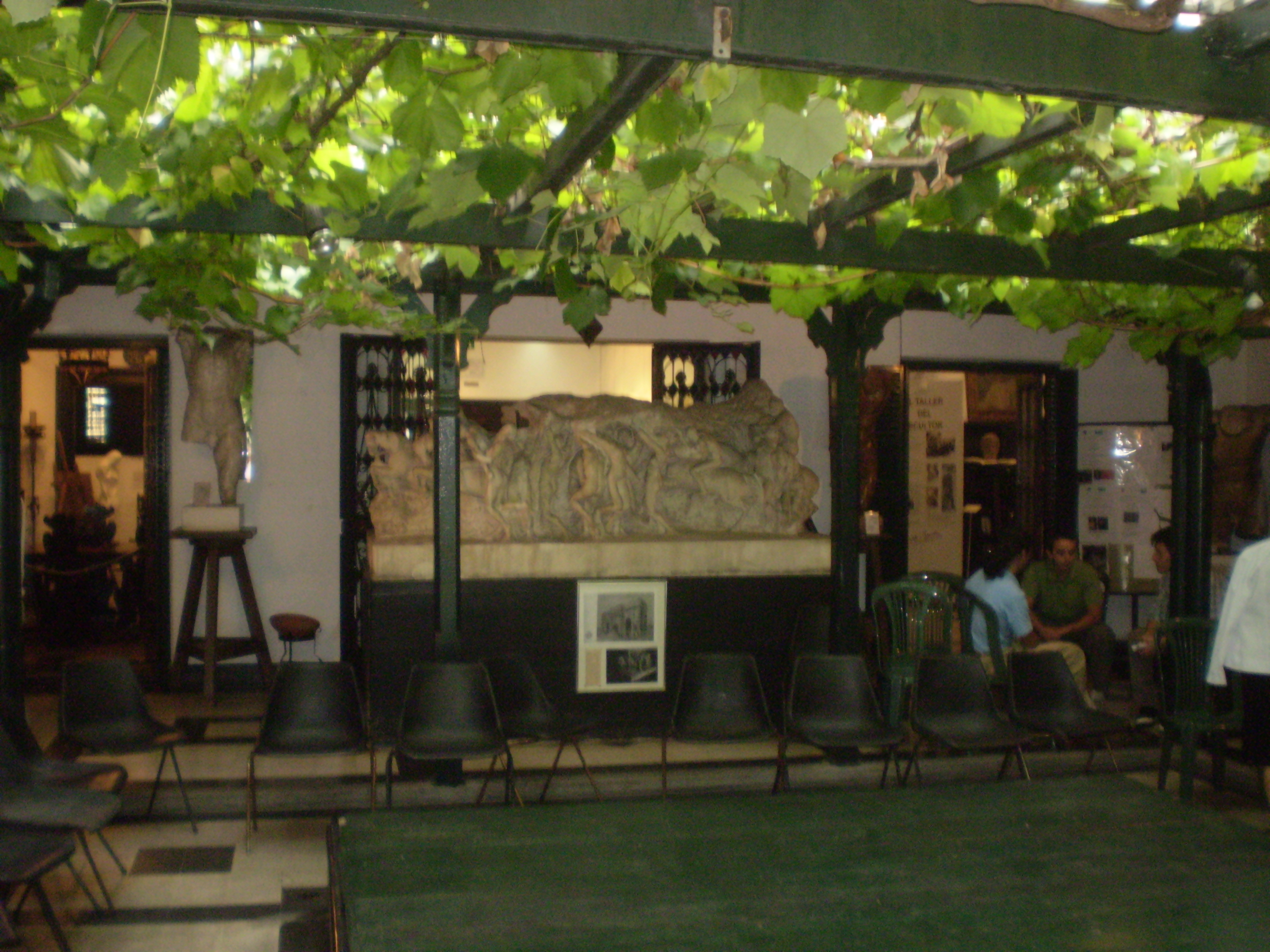
Interior patio
