= Augusto Ballerini =

Argentine painter

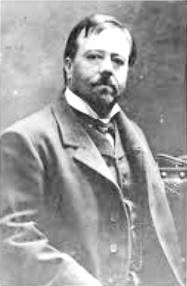
- Born: August 20, 1857; Buenos Aires, Argentina
- Died: April 28, 1902 (age 44); Buenos Aires, Argentina
- Known for: Painting

Augusto Ballerini (20 August 1857, Buenos Aires – 28 February 1902, Buenos Aires) was an Argentine painter of portraits, historical scenes and landscapes.

== Life and work ==
He began his studies with the Italian-born portrait painter, Francisco Romero (1840-1906). His oldest preserved works are drawings of ports, bays, and lighthouses done in the region of Maldonado, Uruguay between 1873 and 1874, when Ballerini was only 16 years old. After a trip to Rome at the age of 18, where he met Pope Leo XIII, upon Romero's recommendation he went to Italy to continue his studies, first with the support of private donors and later on a government scholarship. In 1875, he spent some time in Rome, taking private lessons from Cesare Maccari. He was in Florence in 1878, where he became part of a small group of Argentine artists who were studying there. Upon returning to Buenos Aires. he established himself painting portraits of notable people, and became an avid enthusiast for creating landscapes "en plein air".

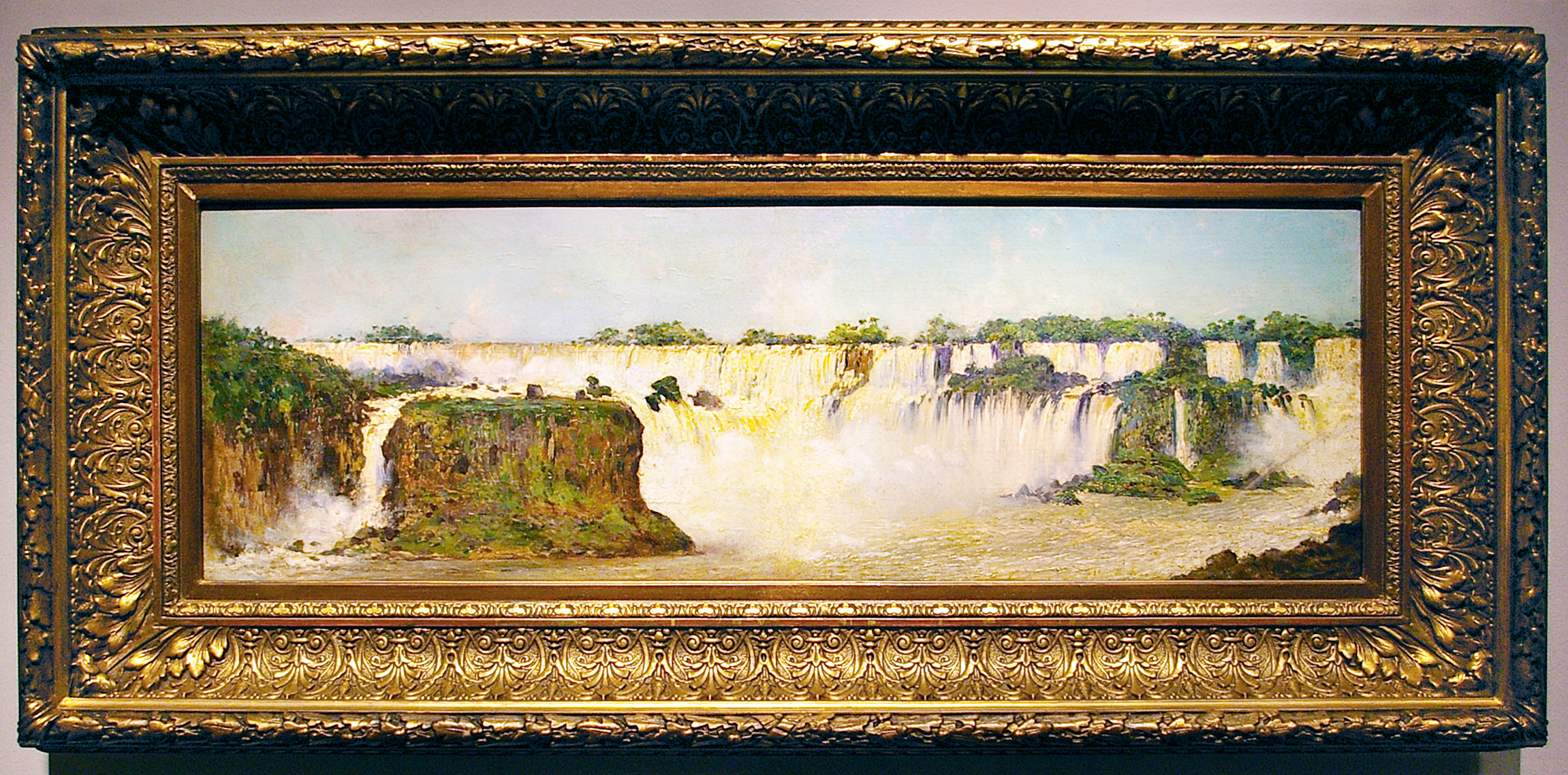
La Cascada del Iguazú (1892)

In 1892, Ballerini was part of the scientific expedition organized by the National Geographic Institute of Argentina and led by Gustavo Niederlein to the Argentine provinces of Chaco, Formosa, Entre Ríos, Corrientes, and Misiones and the neighboring countries of Paraguay and Brazil. He compiled a notebook of sketches, some of which he developed into oil paintings. The trip included a visit to Iguazú Falls, where he was hauled up on ropes to the treetops and painted numerous sketches and watercolors as well as at least one oil. That painting was sent to the World's Columbian Exposition the following year in Chicago where it won a gold medal, and it is now on permanent display as part of the collection of the collection of the National Museum of Fine Arts in Buenos Aires.

In 1895, his painting "A Moonlit Night in Venice", was one of the first works by an Argentine artist to be purchased for the National Museum of Fine Arts. Two years later, he designed sets for the opera Pampa by Arturo Berutti.

Although successful, he found it necessary to supplement his income by giving private art lessons. He also provided numerous drawings for the conservative daily, La Nación, and La Ilustración Argentina. Together with the artists Ángel Della Valle, whom he had met in Florence, and Ernesto de la Cárcova, he created "La Colmena" (The Hive), an institution devoted to promoting and exhibiting local art. Later, he was named an honorary member of a similar organization known as the Sociedad Estímulo de Bellas Artes (Fine Arts Stimulus Society), an institution which played a leading role during the late 19th and early 20th centuries in promoting the fine arts and training painters in Argentina.

Ballerini inaugurated his last exhibition, at the Salón Freitas y Castillo, in April 1902, to the applause of the public and the praise of critics. Eight days later he died suddenly, while it was still in progress. His remains are interred in Recoleta Cemetery. The following year, a major retrospective was held, featuring over 130 of his works.

Among Ballerini's most famous paintings are Miraculous Origin of Our Lady of Luján in the Year 1630 (in the National Museum of Fine Arts) and The Crossing of the Andes. The latter painting, which is in the National Historical Museum, has been used as the basis for the reverse of two Argentine banknotes: 50 pesos moneda nacional (introduced 1968) and 1,000 pesos argentinos (introduced 1987).

== Selected paintings ==
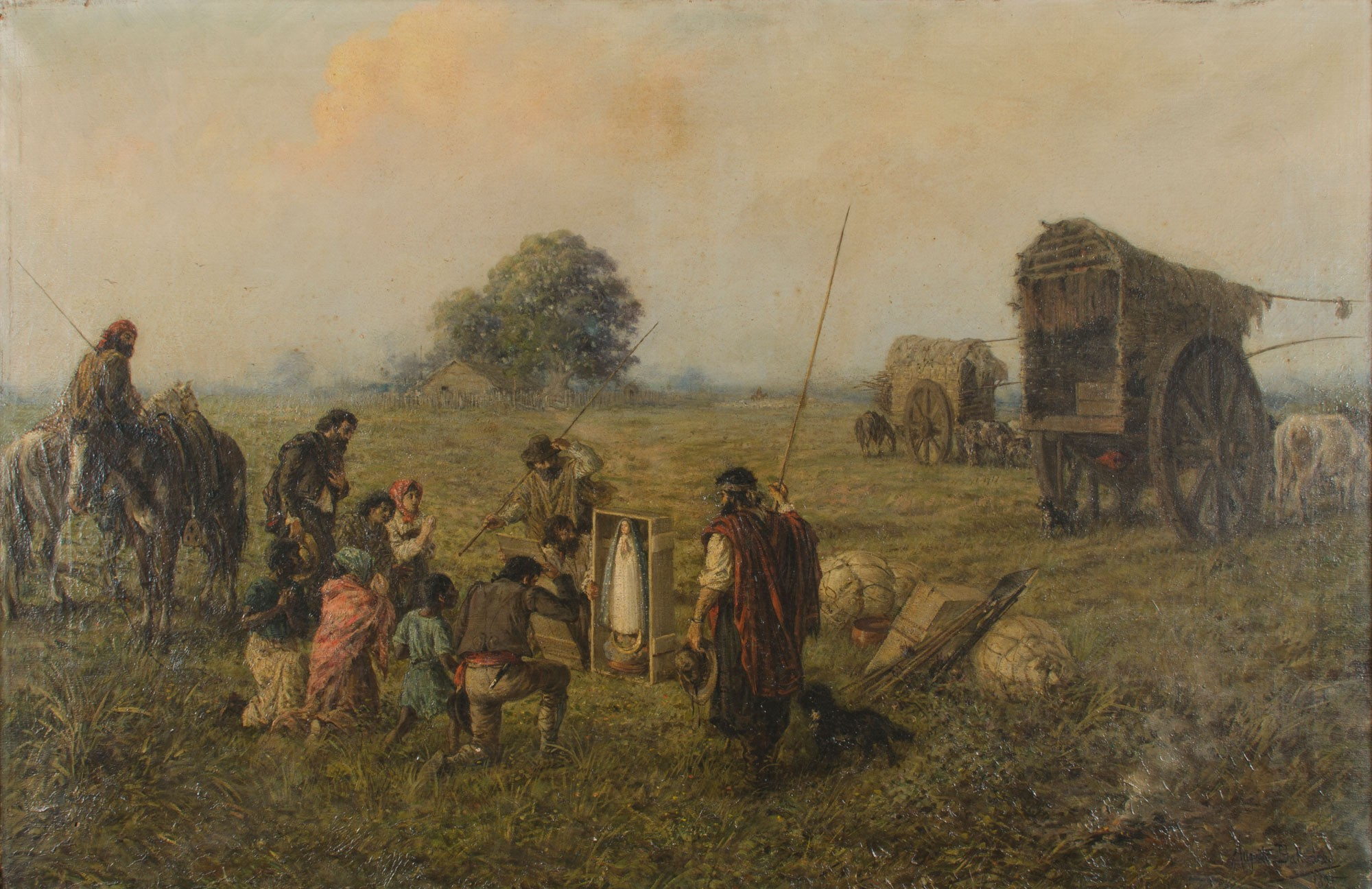
The Miraculous Origin of
Our Lady of Luján

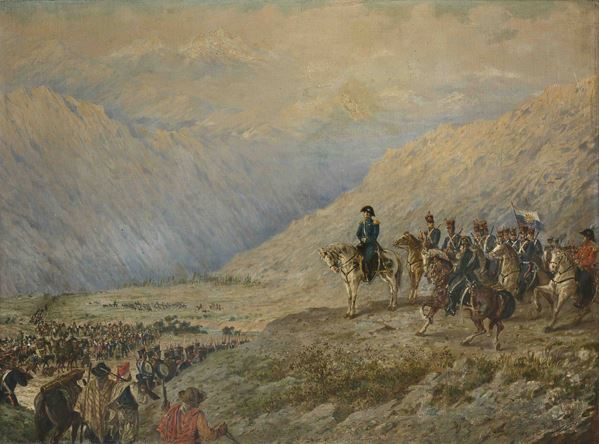
Crossing of the Andes

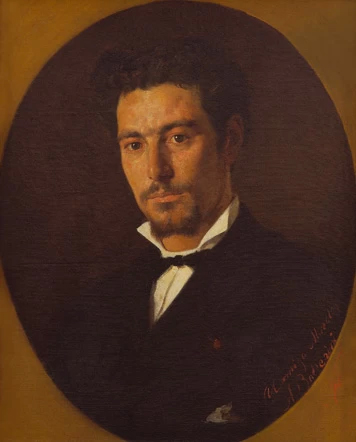
Portrait of Lucio Correa Morales

== Sources ==
- Brief biography and notes @ the Juan B. Castagnino Fine Arts Museum
- Brief biography @ Arte y Colección
- Brief biography @ Todos los Artistas, Fundación Tres Pinos
