= Museum of Contemporary Art of Rosario =

Coordinates: 32°55′49″S 60°39′03″W

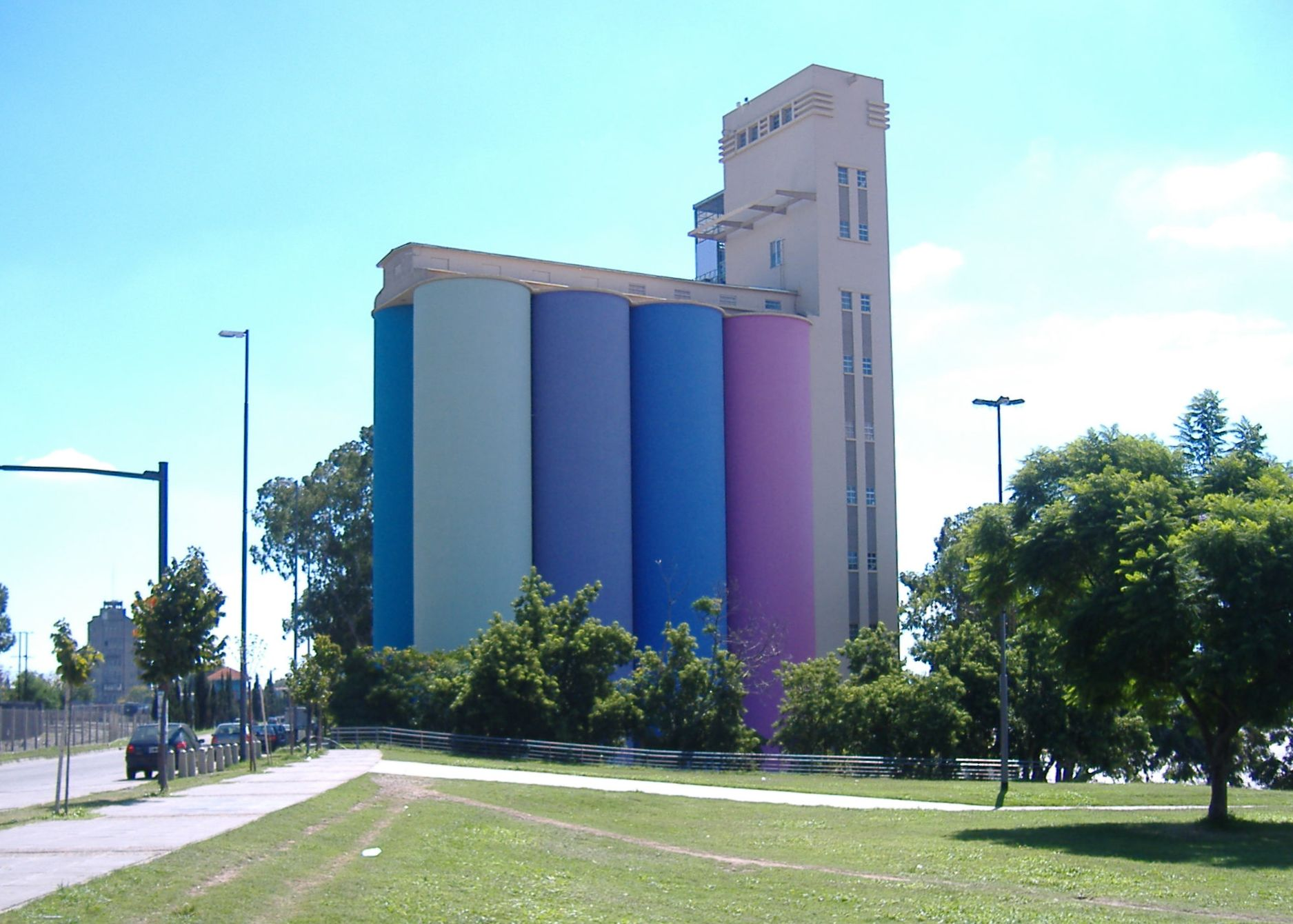
The MACRo (viewed from the south)

The Museum of Contemporary Art of Rosario (Spanish, Museo de Arte Contemporáneo de Rosario, often abbreviated MACRo) is an annex to the Juan B. Castagnino Fine Arts Museum that is devoted to contemporary art. It's located in the city of Rosario, province of Santa Fe, Argentina.

The MACRo lies beside the Paraná River, at the northern end of Oroño Boulevard, on the Estanislao López Riverfront Avenue. It was opened to the public on November 19, 2004.

The works took advantage of the Davis Silos (an abandoned grain silo complex, formerly part of Rosario's port facilities, now moved south). The bulk of the building consists of eight large concrete silos, painted in different colors, with a diameter of 7.5 metres. The idea, according to the official site of the museum, was "to integrally preserve the building, exalting the unique features of concrete, stressing austerity as a value." There is a glass elevator outside the building, for a view of the river scenery and the nearby islands.

The actual museum exhibition is located on an attached building that formerly housed the administrative offices. It has ten floors, for a total area of 970 m² (10,400 ft²), and as of November 2005 maintained a collection of 300 art works by 220 different artists, including Lucio Fontana and Antonio Berni.
