= Elina González Acha de Correa Morales =

Argentine educator, scientist and women's rights activist

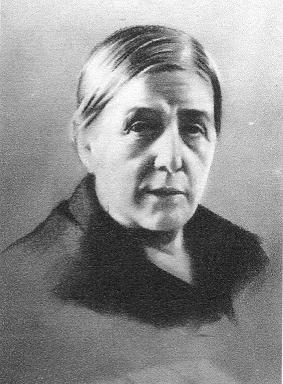
- Born: Elina González Acha; 20 January 1861; Chivilcoy, Buenos Aires Province, Argentina
- Died: 13 August 1942 (aged 81); Buenos Aires, Argentina
- Other names: Elina Correa Morales
- Occupations: Educator, scientist, suffragist, artist and indigenous rights activist
- Years active: 1876–1942
- Known for: Founding the Geographical Society of Argentina
- Spouse: Lucio Correa Morales

Elina González Acha de Correa Morales (20 January 1861 – 13 August 1942) was an Argentine educator, scientist and women's rights activist. In her early days, she was among the first graduates of the Argentine Normal School and was a painter, winning international recognition for both her textbooks and paintings. She was the driving force behind the founding of the Geographical Society of Argentina and served as its president from its establishment until her death. She and her husband, Argentina's first renowned sculptor, Lucio Correa Morales were defenders of the land claims of the indigenous Selkʼnam people.

== Early life ==
Elina González Acha was born on 20 January 1861 in Chivilcoy, Buenos Aires Province, Argentina. She attended the School of the Irish Sisters (Spanish: Escuela de Hermanas Irlandesas) in Chivilcoy and studied French and drawing at home. Her mother, Cristina Acha, who was Basque, enrolled her in the President Roque Sáenz Peña National Normal School of Professors Nº 1 (Spanish: École Nacional Normal de Profesores Nº 1 "Presidente Roque Sáenz Peña") in 1875. González graduated in 1879, becoming one of the first alumni of the Argentine normal school system, and began teaching. She continued her own studies in English, French, German, Latin and drawing. In 1887, she took a position to work at the Public Museum (Spanish: Museo Publico) of Buenos Aires and applied to enter the Argentine Geographic Institute in 1888. In 1890, she began teaching at the Escuela Normal de Belgrano, but resigned for a post as the chair of geography at the Escuela Mariano Acosta. After Ernestina A. López founded the Liceo Nacional de Señoritas later that same year, González became the school's Professor of Geography and Natural Sciences.

González also was married that year to Lucio Correa Morales, who would become the first renowned Argentine sculptor and they had seven children in quick succession. The couple ran an intellectual household and had many visitors from among the elite intelligentsia, as well as receiving delegations of indigenous peoples seeking their help with securing their ancestral rights. They were among those who advocated for promoting women's education and worked on strategies to defend the land claims of the indigenous Selkʼnam people. In 1900, González joined the National Council of Women (Spanish: Consejo Nacional de Mujeres) and completed two oil paintings on canvas, Cabeza and Amalita.

Continuing her own education while teaching, González studied with Eduardo Ladislao Holmberg, collecting insects, learning to embalm birds and began to publish books. Her first publication, Geografía elemental: Libro 1 (Elementary Geography: First Book) was published in 1903 and was a textbook for teaching primary students. This was quickly followed by Ensayo de Geografía Argentina: Parte Física (Essay of Argentine Geography: Physical part) published in 1904 and two reading primers, Isondú and Isopós. She also became one of the members of the executive committee of the Women's Library Association (Spanish: Asociación de Bibliotecas de Mujeres), which was organized by women to improve reading. Her textbook Isondú received a silver medal at the Louisiana Purchase Exposition in St. Louis, Missouri in 1904. Over the next several years, González continued teaching and participated in numerous international conferences, presenting papers on geographic topics. She also participated along with her friends Elisa Bachofen, Argentina's first woman civil engineer; Julianne Dilenius, first PhD of Anthropology in the country; Cecilia Grierson, first Argentine female physician; and Berta Wernicke, first woman professor of physical education and promoter of women's participation in the Olympic Games, in pressing for the enfranchisement of women and their political equality. She retired from teaching in 1910.

== Later career ==
That same year, González presented a paper at the XVII International Congress of the Americas which was shared between Buenos Aires and Mexico. The subject of her presentation was indigenous hunting which she argued had evolved in the manner it had due to the environment. A few months later, she participated in the First International Scientific Conference of the Americas held in conjunction with Argentina's centennial celebrations. As part of a special supplement to the newspaper La Nación, González published the Historia de los Conocimientos Geográficos (History of Geographic Knowledge), which gave a record of the country's topography and boundaries. Of the 300 papers presented in the supplement, only two were authored by women, González and Ernestina A. López. In 1913, her artistic career was boosted when the Museo Nacional de Bellas Artes purchased one of her oil paintings, Cabeza. Two years later, the painting received a silver medal (one of her husband's sculptures won the bronze) at the Panama–Pacific International Exposition in San Francisco, California.

In 1922, González became the driving force in the creation of the Geographical Society of Argentina (Spanish: Sociedad Argentina de Estudios Geográficos) (GÆA), for which she served as president until her death. She became the first female correspondent member of the Geographical Society of Berlin in 1924 and that same year was appointed by the Government to represent Argentina at the International Congress of Geography and Ethnology to be held the following year in Cairo, Egypt. Two years later joined the Mexican National Academy of History and Geography. In 1927, she became a partner in the Parisian Society of the Americas (French: La Société des Américanistes de Paris) and in 1932 was invited to join the Society of Woman Geographers.

In 1935, González published, with her daughter, Cristina, Amalita: libro de lectura para cuarto grado, a 4th grade primer. The book described the country's landscapes, folk history, and talked about natural phenomena like wind and eclipses. González met with Rosario Vera Peñaloza and the board of directors of GÆA in 1937 to design and construct relief maps of the country showing all of the provinces. In 1939, her textbooks were honored by the United States. González strove throughout her career to highlight the importance of preserving the geographic history, nomenclature and customs of Argentina and she advocated for standardization and cataloging. In 1941, she presented a proposal for a bill to be submitted through the legislature to protect the national toponymy.

González died on 13 August 1942 in Buenos Aires. Two years later when GÆA established their new headquarters, a portrait of González, painted by her daughter Lía Correa Morales de Yrurtia was installed in her memory. In 1962, on the 40th anniversary of GÆA's founding, a memorial was held at the Recoleta Cemetery in her honor. In 1972, a prize bearing her name, to honor the best graduate in geography was established by the Ministry of Culture and in 1991 a chair bearing her name was established by the National Academy of Geography. She and Ana Palese de Torres are the only two Argentinian women so honored, in the academy's forty chairs.

== Selected works ==
- de Correa Morales, Elina G. A.; Carbone, M E (1903). Geografía elemental: Libro 1 (in Spanish). Buenos Aires, Argentina: Cabaut Ed. OCLC 835357570.
- de Correa Morales, Elina G. A. (1904). Ensayo de Geografía Argentina: Parte Física (in Spanish). Buenos Aires, Argentina.
- Correa Morales, Elina González Acha (1906). Isondú: lecturas variadas para las escuelas comunes (in Spanish). Buenos Aires, Argentina: Cabaut.
- Correa Morales, Elina González Acha (1911). Isipós (in Spanish). Buenos Aires, Argentina: Cabaut.
- de Correa Morales, Elina G.A. (1910). Ensayo de geografía argentina, parte física (in Spanish). Buenos Aires, Argentina: Cabaut y cía. OCLC 21614558.
- de Correa Morales, Elina González Acha (1911). Isipós tradiciones y cuentos para niños (in Spanish). Buenos Aires, Argentina: Cabaut y cía. OCLC 610579771.
- de Correa Morales, Elina González Acha (1912). Facultades que han contribuído á desarrollar el ejercicio de la caza entre los primitivos (in Spanish). Buenos Aires, Argentina: Impr. de Coni Hermanos. OCLC 252817206.
- Correa Morales, Elina González Acha (1935). Amalita: libro de lectura para cuarto grado (in Spanish). Buenos Aires, Argentina: Talleres J. Peuser.
