= Rogelio Yrurtia =

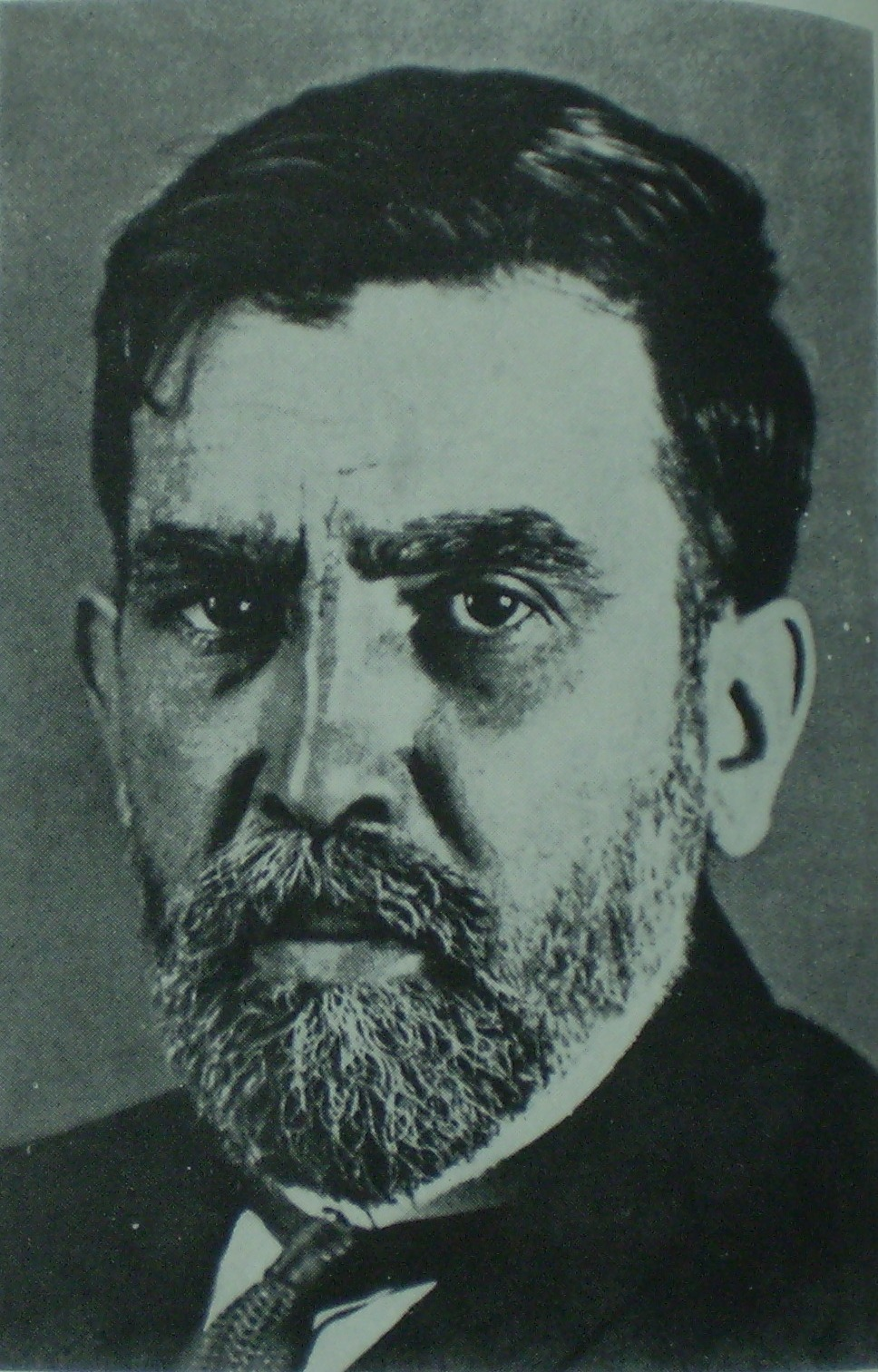
Sculptor Rogelio Yrurtia

Rogelio Yrurtia (December 6, 1879 – March 4, 1950) was a renowned Argentine sculptor of the Realist school.

== Life and work ==
Born in Buenos Aires, Argentina to Basque immigrants in 1879, Rogelio Yrurtia enrolled in the local Society for the Promotion of Fine Arts in 1899. A talented student, he quickly earned a scholarship on which he traveled to Paris. There, he attended the prestigious Académie Julian, where he was apprenticed under Jules-Felix Coutan. Securing his first exhibition at the National Society of French Artists in 1903, he obtained a Grand Prize at the 1904 Louisiana Purchase Exposition in St. Louis, Missouri.

Yrurtia returned to Buenos Aires in 1905, where he presented a number of exhibitions and, in 1907, was commissioned to create a monument to 1820s-era Argentine statesman Manuel Dorrego. Relocating to Barcelona, Spain, his work earned him a Grand Prize at the 1911 International Arts Exposition there. Upon his return to Buenos Aires in 1916, Yrurtia was commissioned to sculpt a likeness of Bernardino Rivadavia, the first Constitutional President of Argentina, for a mausoleum planned in his honor for Plaza Miserere (it's worth noting that Rivadavia, who died in exile in 1845, had requested that his remains not return to Argentina).

Continuing to exhibit successfully in Argentina and abroad, the city of Buenos Aires commissioned him for the creation of a monument to grace a median plaza along Paseo Colón, a major thoroughfare south of downtown. The monument, Ode to Labour, was inaugurated in 1927 and stands as Yrurtia's most ambitious work, remaining arguably his best-known. Industrialist and philanthropist Carlos Delcasse commissioned Yrurtia for his crypt in the Buenos Aires suburb of Vicente López, which the noted sculptor completed in 1936. The work's highlight, Justice, was created at Delcasse's request; though not a jurist, Delcasse considered himself a "friend of the court." The sculpture was reproduced in bronze for the Argentine Supreme Court.

Creating a Moses for the 1937 grand opening of the Juan B. Castagnino Fine Arts Museum in Rosario, Yrurtia became one of the founding members of the National Academy of Fine Arts in 1938 and he continued to exhibit periodically, working from his Baroque home in the Belgrano section of Buenos Aires. Yrurtia died there in 1950, bequeathing his home as a museum. The Boxers, one of his last works, stands in the central courtyard.

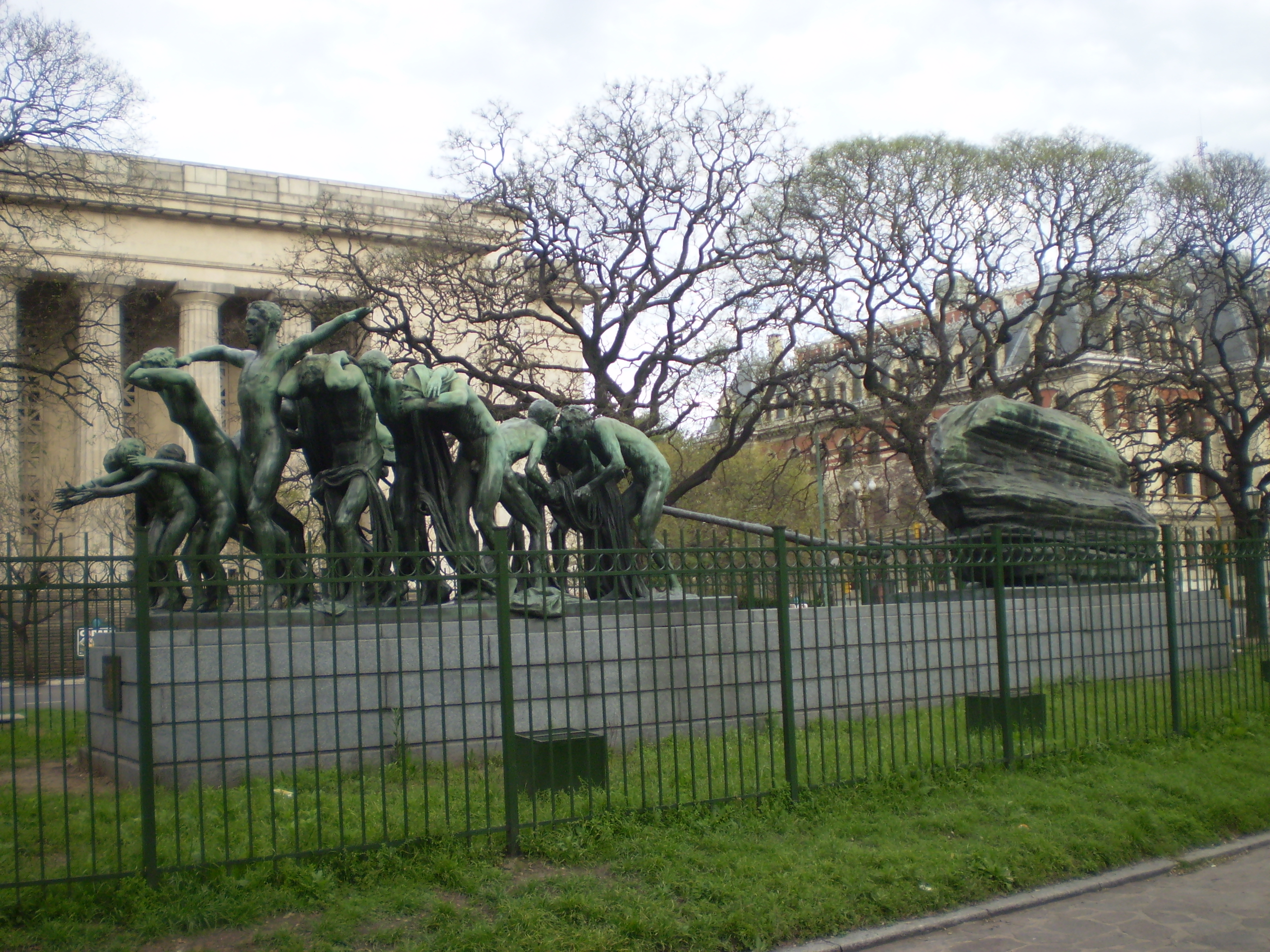
Ode to Labour

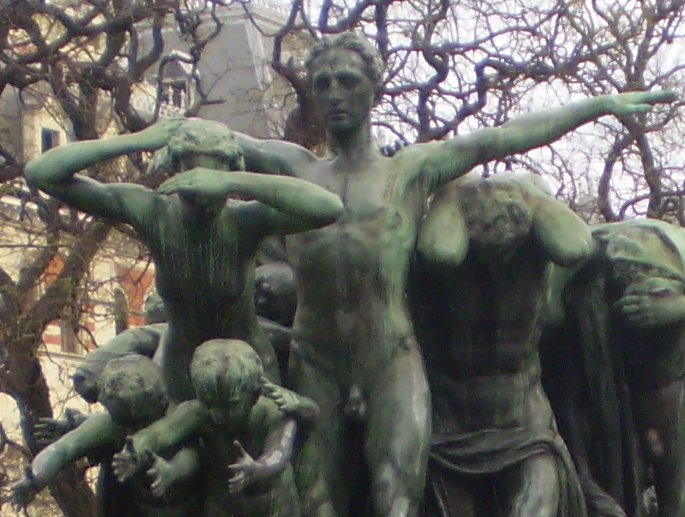
Ode to Labour – detail

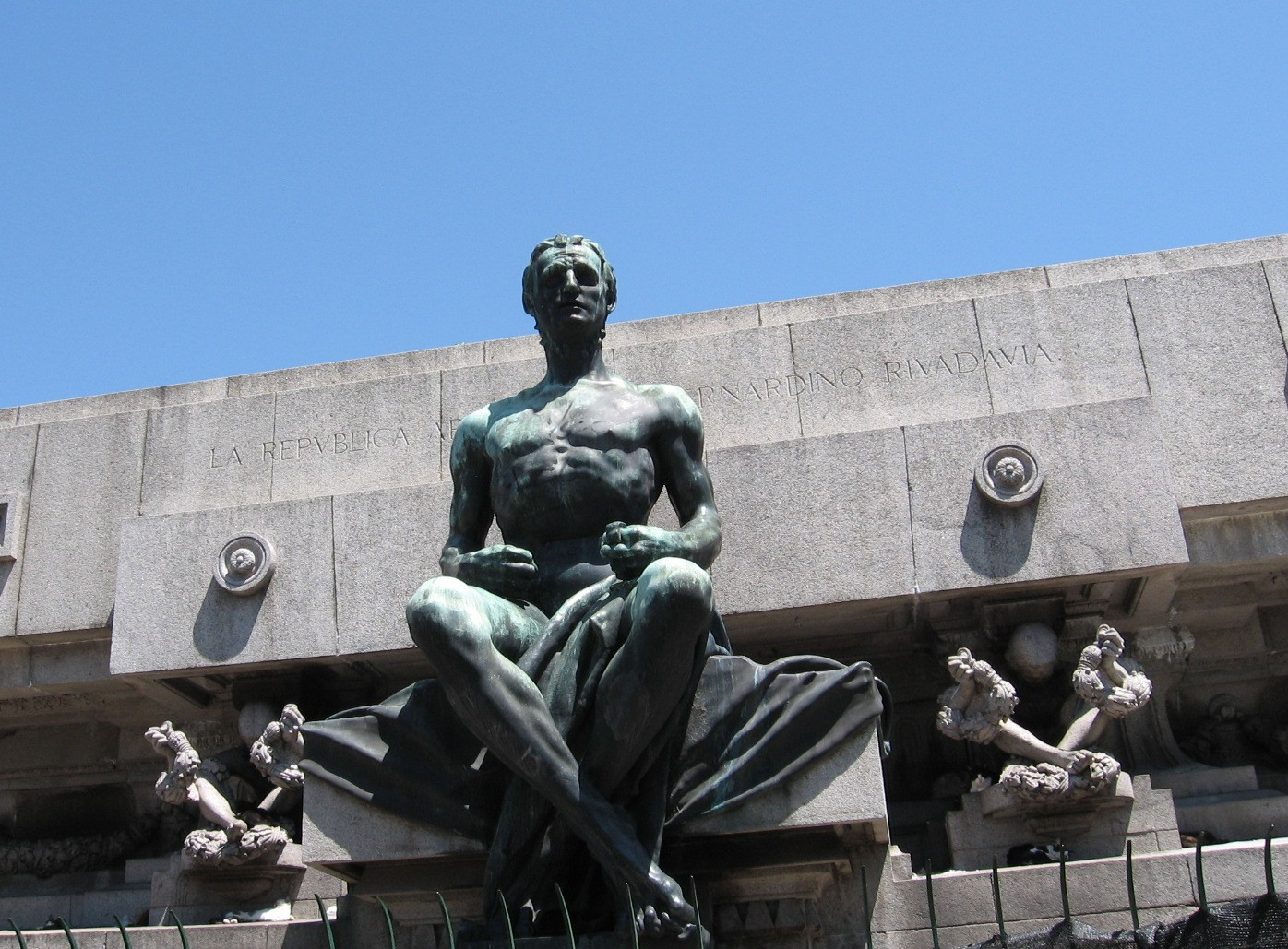
Monument to Bernardino Rivadavia

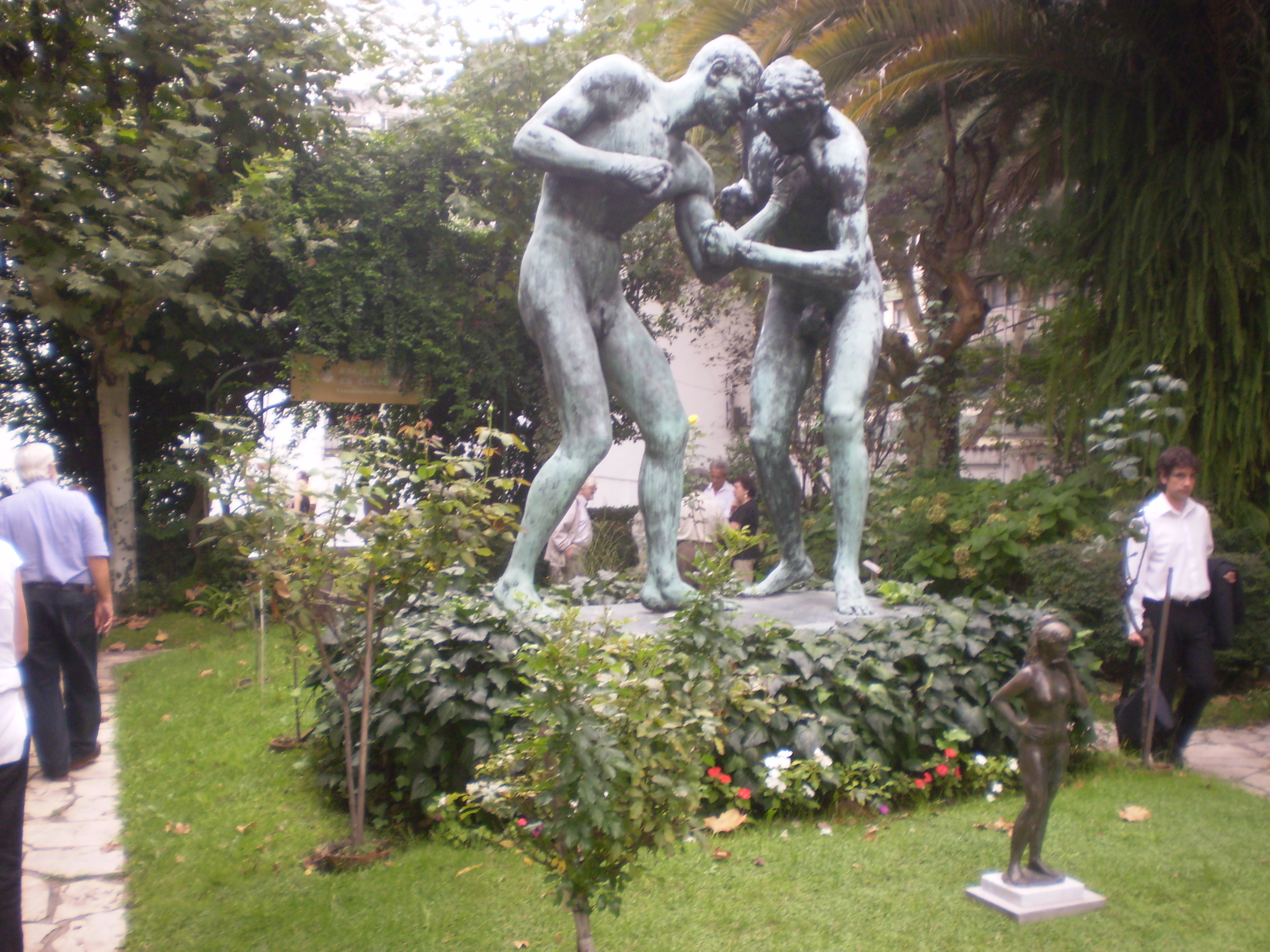
The Boxers, Yrurtia Museum

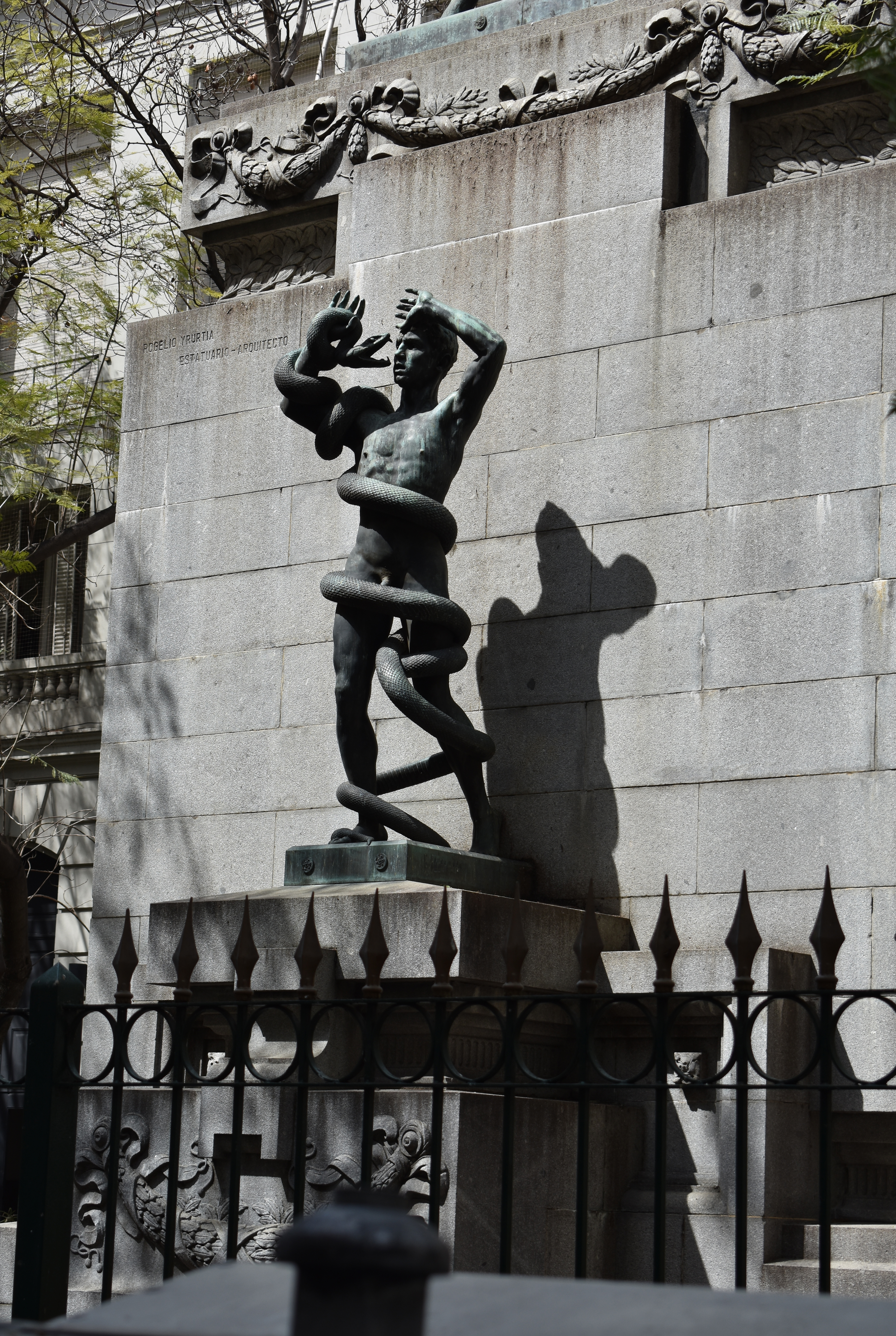
Alegoría de la Fatalidad (1926), part of Monument to Manuel Dorrego, Buenos Aires
