= Antonio Ruiz (soldier) =

Argentine national hero (died 1824)

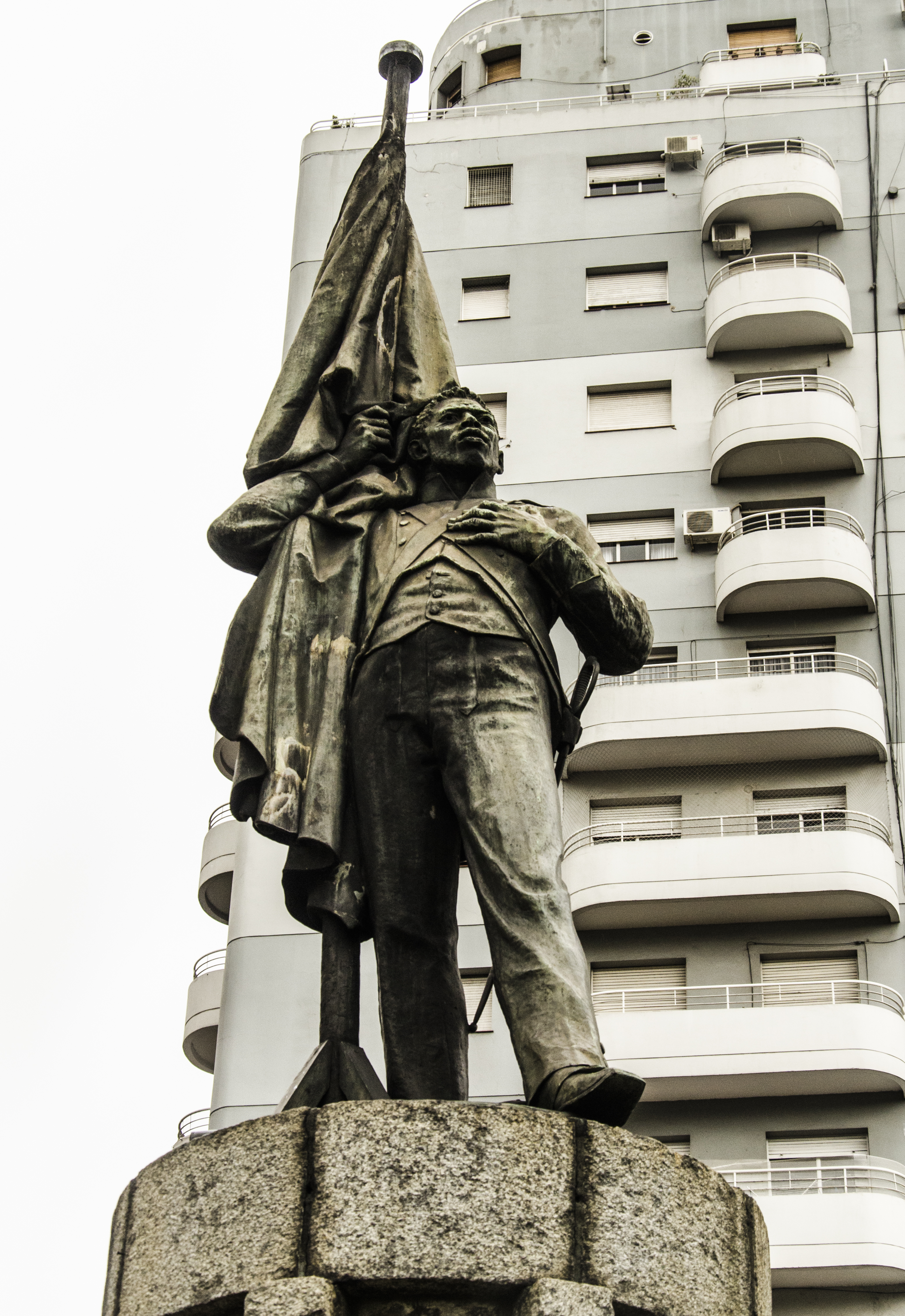
- Statue of Falucho in Buenos Aires, by Lucio Correa Morales.
- Born: Buenos Aires, Argentina or possibly Africa
- Died: 6 February 1824 Callao, Peru
- Rank: Second Corporal

Antonio Ruiz (died 6 February 1824) was an Argentine soldier and national hero of Argentina. Ruiz, nicknamed Falucho, was an Afro-Argentine soldier of the war of independence. Ruiz fought in José de San Martín’s army. According to the most common story, Corporal Ruiz, born a slave (perhaps in Africa), served in the Regiment of the River Plate and died while defending the colors (white and light blue) of the revolutionary flag (later the Argentine flag) against traitors during a revolt at the fort of El Callao, Peru) on February 6, 1824. Rather than hoist the Spanish flag, Falucho chose to be shot by the traitors, crying out with his last breath "¡Viva Buenos Aires!" (Long live Buenos Aires!).

== Biography ==
Not much is known about Ruiz's life. According to some sources, he was born in Buenos Aires, while others claim he was born in Africa.

On the night of 4 to 5 February 1824, the garrison of El Callao, which was composed by the remains of Army of the Andes and an artillery company from Chile, started a mutiny, which was joined by two squadrons of the Mounted Grenadiers Regiment.

These soldiers revolted because they were owed five months' pay, to what was said the day before had been paid the salaries of the officers, the desire to return home, either Buenos Aires or Chile, and the disgust of having to sail north to swell the army of Bolivar. Seeing the prevailing indiscipline, the mulatto Moyano, Olive accepts the suggestion of consulting Royalist Colonel Jose María Casariego, who was taken captive and lodged there. Casariego saw the advantage he could derive from the situation and advised to replace the patriot leaders by Spanish.

Casariego convinced them to join the royal ranks where they would be rewarded, while the Patriots would receive punishment. In the midst of this disorder took place the remarkable story of Falucho. His story was first published on 14 May 1857 by Historian and politician Bartolomé Mitre at Los Debates journal.

The night of 6 February the black Falucho was a sentry in the tower of King Philip, which belonged to the Regiment of the River Plate. He was well known for their bravery and their patriotism. For many involved in the uprising, this had no further dimension than a mutiny in the barracks. Mitre tells that "While the dark-veiled sentinel was in the high castle tower, where rose the flagstick, which made few hours in the Argentine flag flew, Casariego the rebels decided to fly the Spanish flag in the dark the night before that they should repent of his resolution. "At that point come before the black Falucho, soldiers with the Spanish standard against which they fought for 14 years. Falucho could not believe it, and feeling totally humiliated sinks to the ground and weeps bitterly. The soldiers with orders to raise the Spanish flag, ordered Falucho to salute the flag of the King who was going to fly. Falucho answered sadly getting the gun he had dropped "I can not do honor to the flag against which I will fight forever," then the mutineers shout at him: "Revolution!" Revolutionary! ".

According to Mitre, Falucho responded with: "Being a revolutionary is evil, but being a traitor is worse!" And taking his rifle by the barrel, smashed against the flagstick, giving back to more grief. The executors of the betrayal seized Falucho immediately and shot four rounds at point blank on his chest and head. Before falling mortally wounded on the ground, Falucho cried "¡Viva Buenos Aires!".

Mitre wrote that Falucho was born in Buenos Aires and his real name was Antonio Ruiz. The story was republished by Mitre in La Nación newspaper on 6, 7, 8 and 9 April 1875. He later published the book "History of San Martin and American emancipation". Regarding Falucho, Mitre writes: "The Spanish flag was hoisted on the tower Independence, with an overall saving of castles (February 7). A black soldier from the regiment of the Rio de la Plata, born in Buenos Aires named Antonio Ruiz (whose surname Falucho), who struggled to do justice, was shot at the foot of the Spanish flag. He died shouting Viva Buenos Aires! ".

Bartolomé Mitre take as the basis the oral testimony of General Enrique Martinez, director of the Division of the Andes, the testimony of Colonel Pedro Jose Díaz and Pedro Luna, and the written testimony of Colonel Juan Espinosa. Mitre say then that there were two black soldiers dubbed Falucho, apparently it was a generic nickname given to the black people in the army. Since the first publication of Mitre, his account rose critics and detractors. In 1899, Manuel J. Mantilla wrote in his book Los Negros Argentinos stating that there were two Faluchos, Ruiz, whose fate was recalled by Martinez and Diaz-Espinosa, and another who lived in Lima in 1830, according to Miller's letter to San Martin del 20 August that year. Miller named him saying "the morenito Falucho, which served in the 8 Company of Sharpshooters and took a flag in Maipú".

According to historian Mantilla in 1819, there was a second Antonio Ruiz among the members of the Company of Captain Manuel Díaz, while in that of Pedro José Díaz there wasn't a soldier of that name. Many authors claim that the heroic death of Falucho was an invention of Mitre. In light of all existing evidence. The only thing we know for sure is that a black soldier died heroically in El Callao while refusing to honor the Spanish royal flag. But certainly, this soldier was not Falucho. Falucho was a black soldier in the 8th Battalion of the Army of the Andes that was possibly the 'second' Antonio Ruiz. This soldier was well known to San Martin and Guido and lived in Lima in 1830.
