= Lucio Correa Morales =

Argentine sculptor

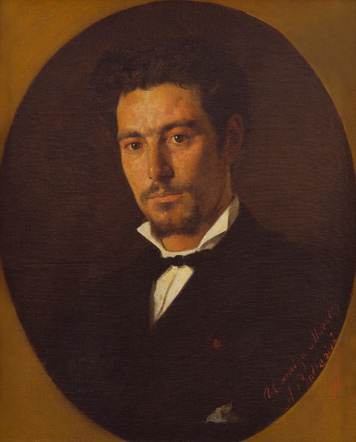
Lucio Correa Morales; portrait by Augusto Ballerini (1878)

Lucio Correa Morales (3 July 1852, Navarro - 30 June 1923, Buenos Aires) was one of the first major Argentine sculptors.

== Life and work ==
Thanks to a stipend, granted by President Domingo Sarmiento in 1874, he was able to study in Florence, Italy, at the Accademia di Belle Arti. He returned in 1882, and created his first significant works. One, depicting a Native-American from the Pampas, received critical acclaim.

Over the next forty years, he created numerous works based on Argentine culture, such as "El Gaucho" and "La Ondina del Plata" (Undine of the Río de la Plata); as well as statues of notable figures in Argentine history, including Falucho, Juan Bautista Alberdi, Francisco Laprida and Bartolomé Mitre. He travelled extensively throughout Argentina, observing the native peoples and criollos, to ensure that he was representing them accurately.

One of his most familiar works, "La Cautiva" (The Captive) derives from a personal childhood experience. Indigenous people were often forcibly detained as servants. One such "captive" came to his home, hugged one of his playmates and cried, saying that her own children had been taken from her. This made a lasting impression that was expressed in the statue. It is currently in front of the University of Buenos Aires Law School.

He was a teacher at several institutions and organizations, including the University of Buenos Aires, the Escuela Normal de Profesores, and the Sociedad Estímulo de Bellas Artes. Many distinguished sculptors number among his students, notably Rogelio Yrurtia and Pedro Zonza Briano.

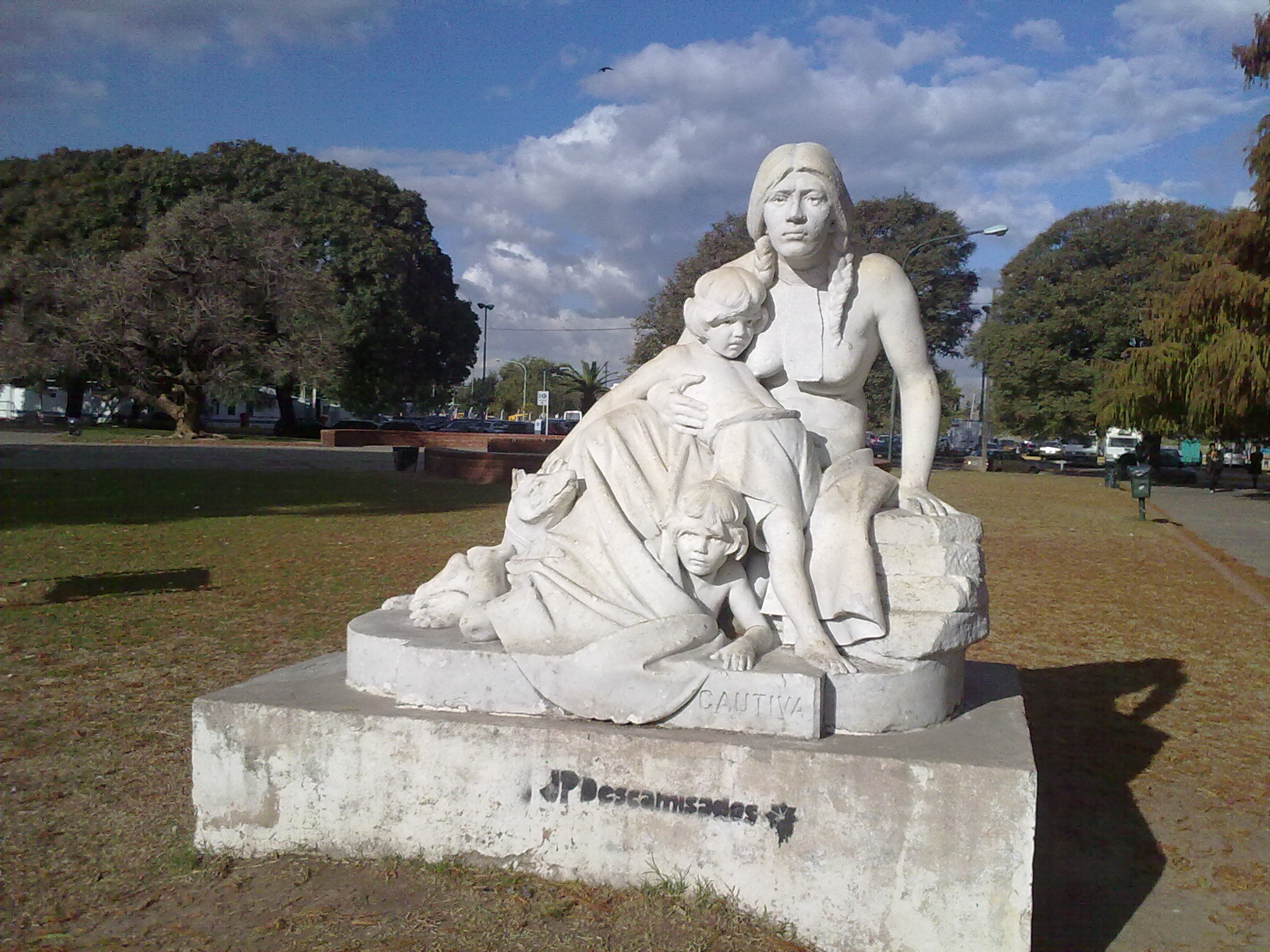
The Captive

In 1890, he married the educator and women's rights activist, Elina González Acha. They had seven children; one of whom was the artist, Lía Correa Morales.
