= Juan B. Castagnino Fine Arts Museum =

Museum in Argentina

Coordinates: 32.9539°S 60.6566°W

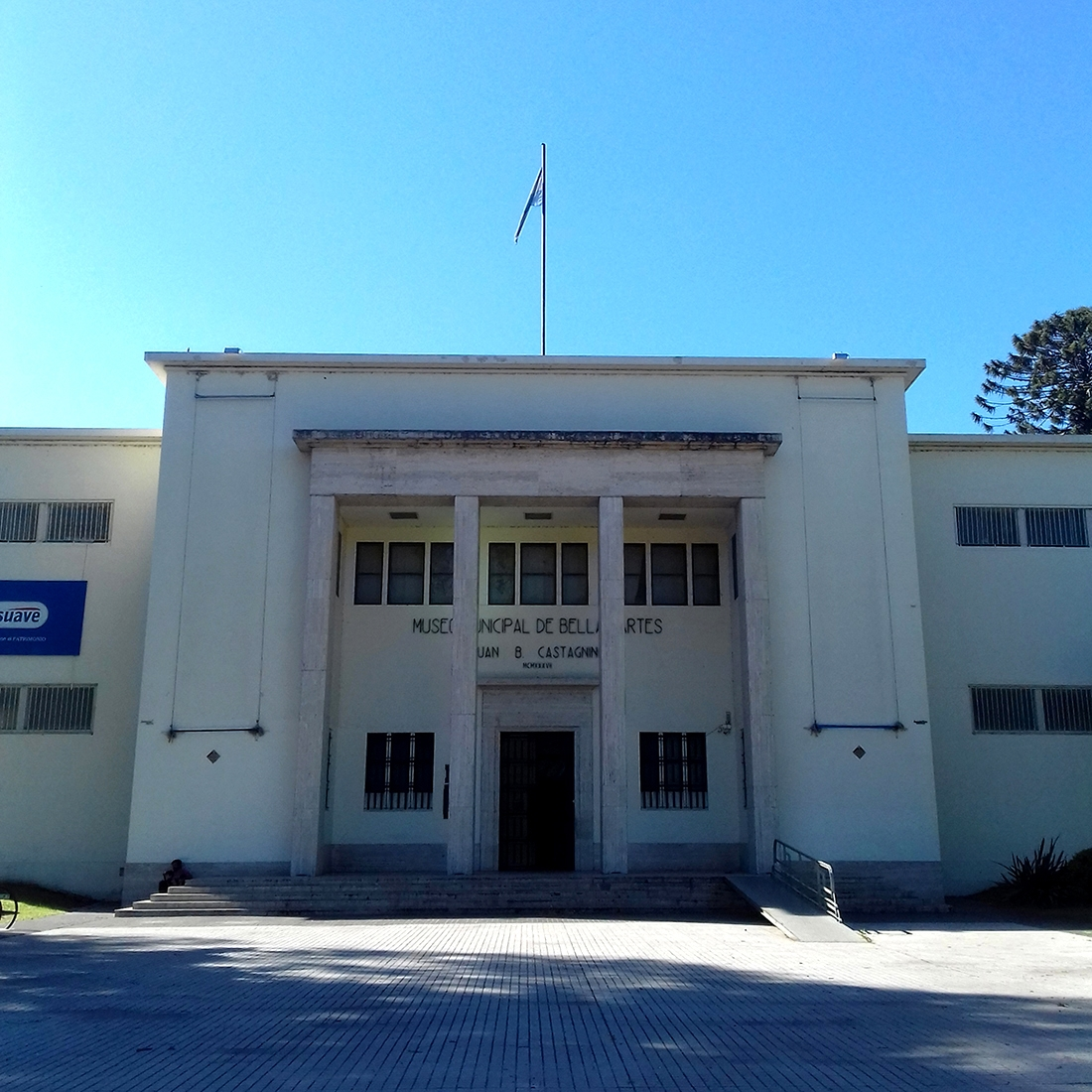
Juan B. Castagnino Fine Arts Museum

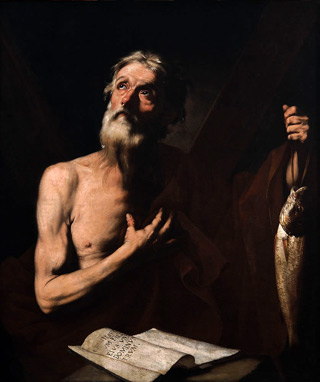
Santo André, padroeiro dos pescadores (1634), by José de Ribera. One of the highlights of the museums' collection.

The Juan B. Castagnino Fine Arts Museum (Spanish: Museo de Bellas Artes Juan B. Castagnino) is an art museum in the city of Rosario, province of Santa Fe, Argentina, considered the most important of the interior of the country and the second in national terms. It is administered by the municipal government. The museum lies within the Parque de la Independencia (the largest of Rosario's urban parks) immediately outside the city center, at the intersection of Oroño Boulevard and Pellegrini Avenue.

The building was a project by architects Hilarión Hernández Larguía and Juan Manuel Newton and opened in 1936. It was donated to the Municipality by Mrs. Rosa Tiscornia de Castagnino in memory of her late son Juan Bautista Castagnino, an important art critic and collector at the time, and officially inaugurated as a museum on 7 December 1937.

The museum has two floors, totalling 35 rooms with 700 linear meters available for exhibitions. The initial artistic patrimony of the museum was gathered from donations by private collectors, plus the patrimony of the former Municipal Fine Arts Museum, and then augmented by purchases by the municipality and the museum Foundation. It now consists of more than 3,000 works, comprising European art, Argentine art of the 19th and 20th century, and works by Rosario artists until the 1930s. The contemporary art collection (about 300 works acquired in more recent times) was moved to a new museum, the Museum of Contemporary Art of Rosario (MACRo), opened in 2004.

== Gallery ==
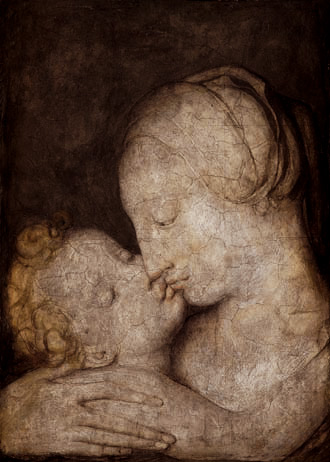
Anonymous Italian painter. Virgin and Child, 16th century.

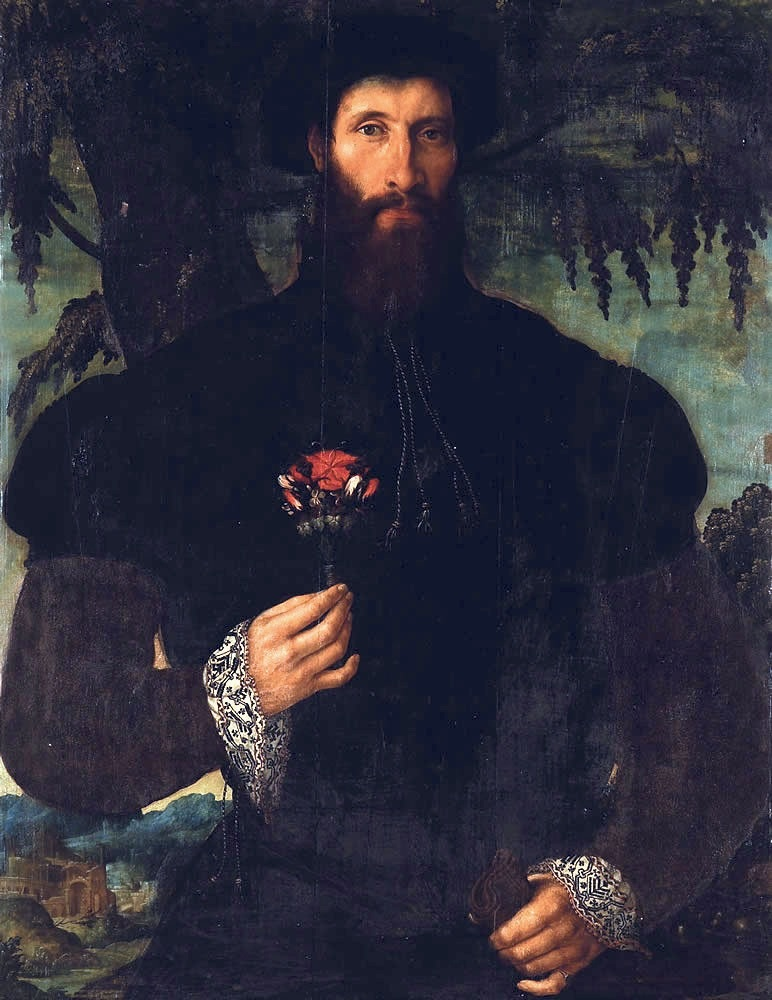
Maarten van Heemskerck. Self Portrait, 16th century.

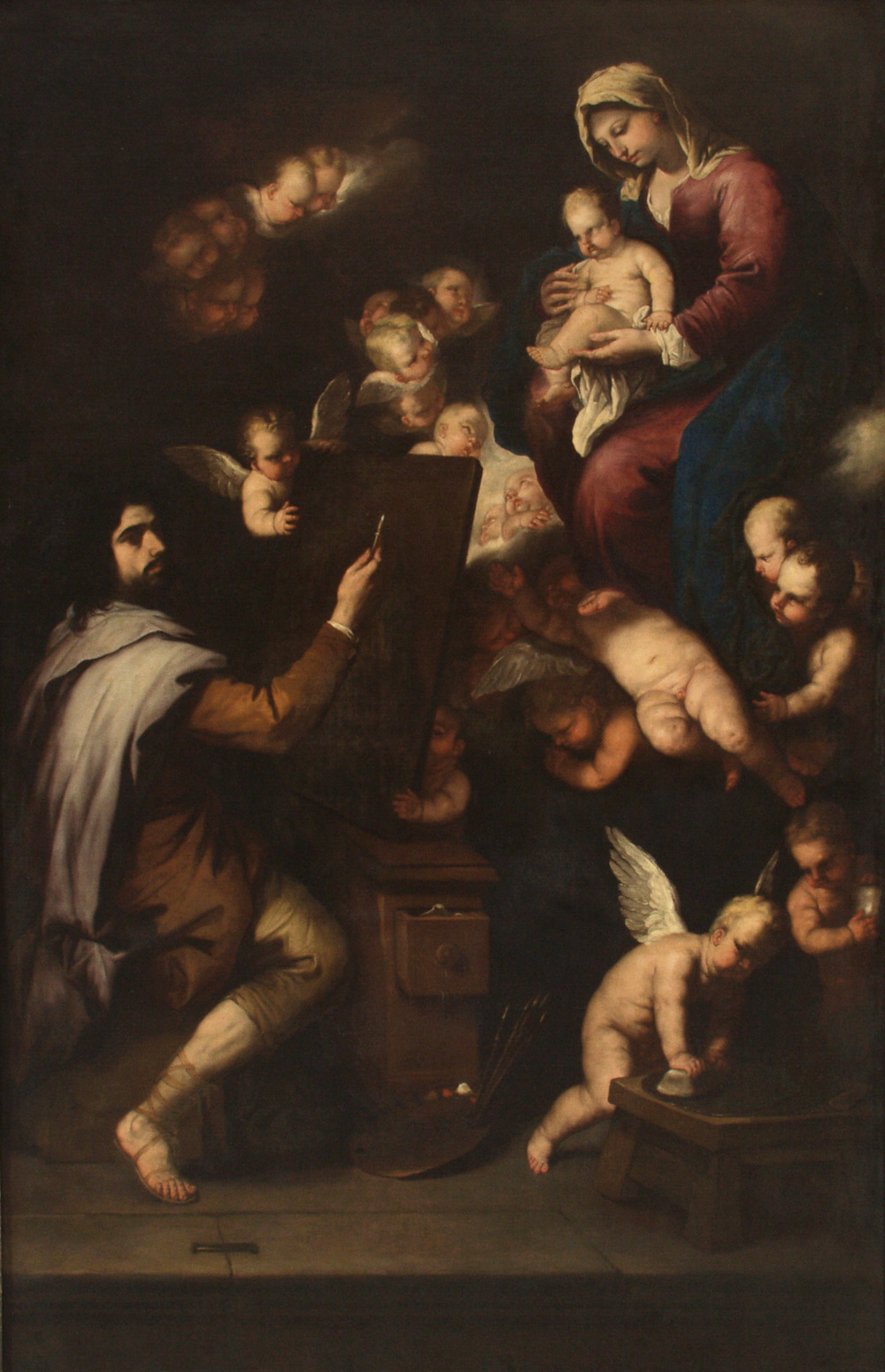
Luca Giordano. Saint Luke painting the Virgin, circa. 1660–1665.

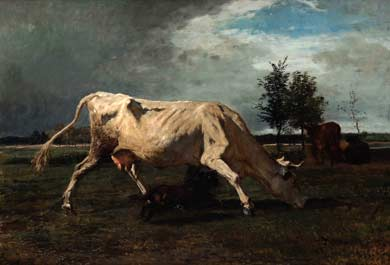
Constant Troyon. Cow chased by a dog, date unknown.

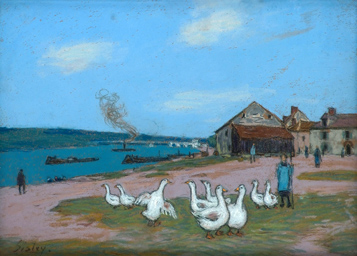
Alfred Sisley. Village of Saint Mammès, circa. 1898.

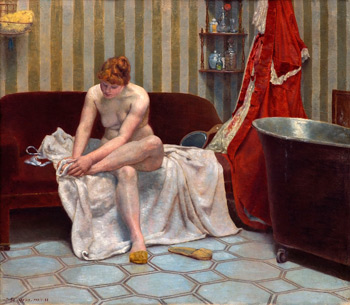
Eduardo Schiaffino. Naked, 1888.

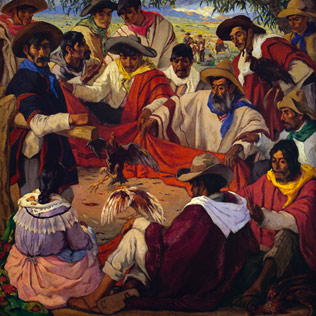
Jorge Bermudez. Rooster, 1917.

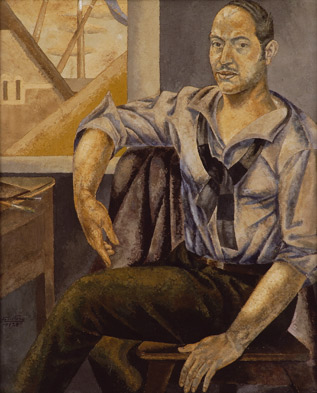
Alfredo Guttero. Portrait of a Victorian Painter, 1929.
