= Mignini =

Mignini is a surname. Notable people with the surname include:

- Carolyn Mignini (fl. 2019), American actor
- Franco Mignini (1921–1987), Venezuelan sports shooter
- Giuliano Mignini (born 1950), Italian public prosecutor
- Mariano Mignini (born 1975), Argentine footballer

== See also ==
- Magnini
