= Juan Carlos Castagnino Municipal Museum of Art =

Coordinates: 38°00′37″S 57°32′08″W

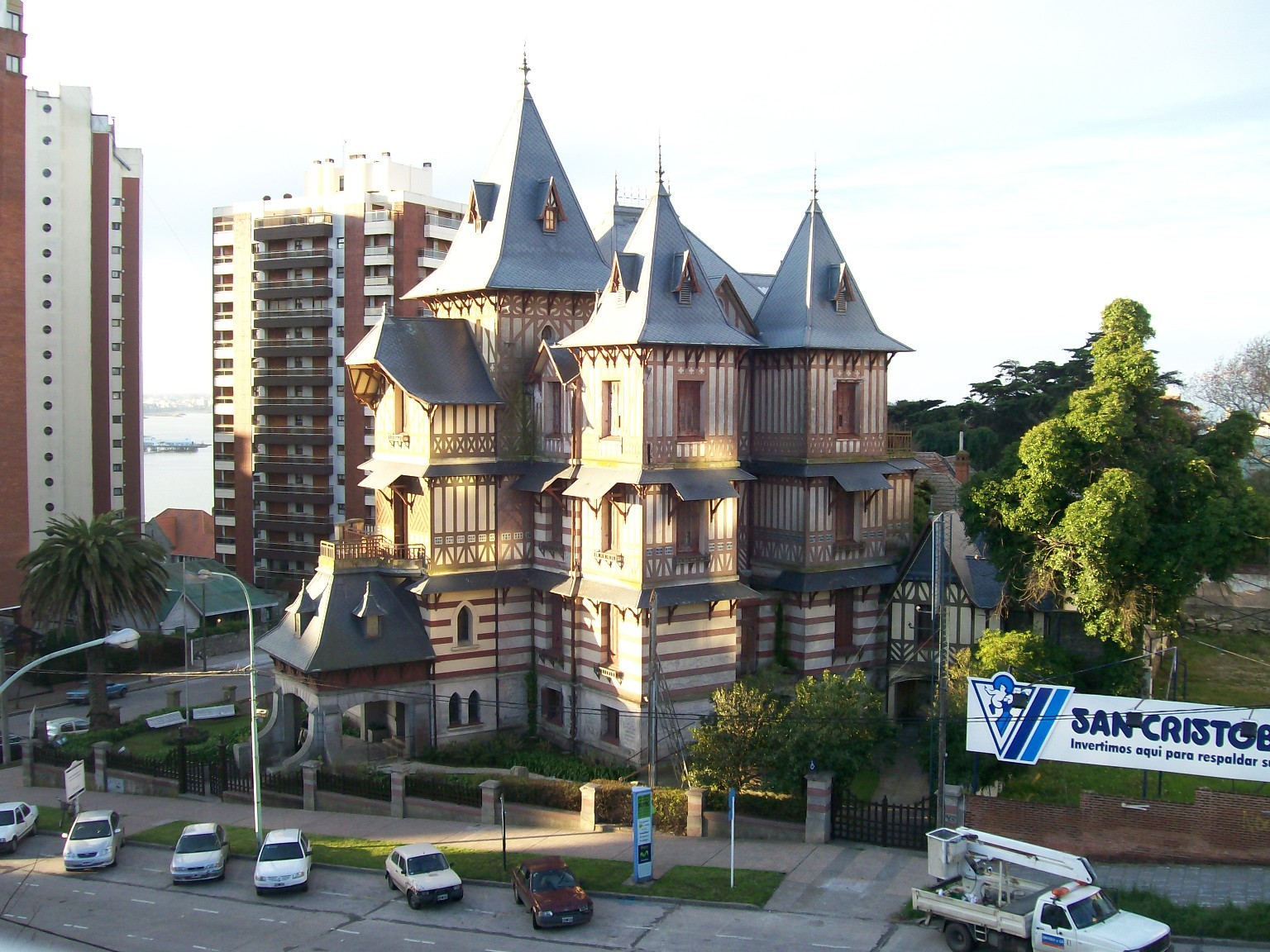
The Castagnino Museum

The Juan Carlos Castagnino Municipal Museum of Art is a museum of fine arts in Mar del Plata, Argentina. Its building, the Ortiz Basualdo Villa, is a National Monument of Argentina.

== Overview ==
Commissioned by the Ortíz Basualdo family of Buenos Aires, the villa on Mar del Plata's Stella Maris Hill was built in 1909 as a summer residence. Designed by Luis Dubois and Pablo Pater, the eclecticist, the Art Nouveau villa followed a picturesque movement in French architecture common to new, upscale residences in both France and Argentina, at the time (the exterior's half-timber motif, accordingly, was painted on). The structure, predominantly in stone, was capped by zinc mansard roofing.

The oceanfront city was given its first municipal museum of fine art in 1938, when the facility was inaugurated in the Mar del Plata City Hall. The museum gathered a collection of mainly modern art in subsequent decades, and in particular works by local realist painter and muralist Juan Carlos Castagnino.

The donation of the villa by the Ortíz Basualdo family resulted in the museum's relocation, and the institution was re-inaugurated therein on July 9, 1980. The family's donation included a large selection of furniture acquired between 1909 and the villa's remodel in 1918. The collection, designed by Belgian architect and cabinetmaker Gustave Serrurier-Bovy, is widely considered among the world's finest of its type, and was incorporated into the museum's exhibits.

The museum's collections feature nearly 600 paintings, sculptures, lithographs, photographs and other works, including those by Argentine artists Antonio Berni, Alberto Bruzzone, Prilidiano Pueyrredón, Luis Seoane, Raúl Soldi, and Juan Carlos Castagnino, for whom the museum was renamed in 1982, and of whom the museum houses 138 works.

Across the street from the Mar del Plata Museum of the Sea, the villa, an exhibit in itself, was declared Cultural Heritage of the City of Mar del Plata in 1995.

In December 2020, the Ortiz Basualdo Villa was declared National Monument of Argentina.
