= Mar del Plata =

City in Buenos Aires Province, Argentina

- City
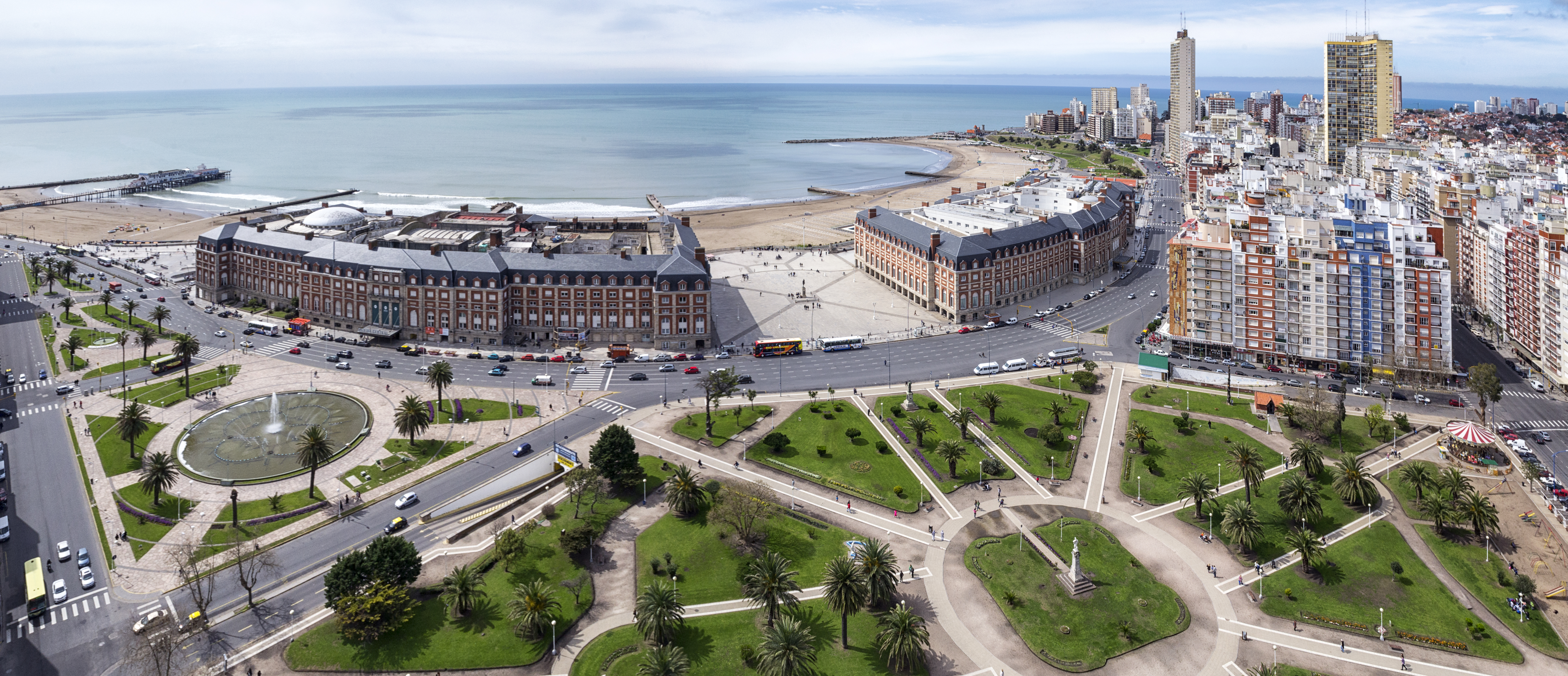
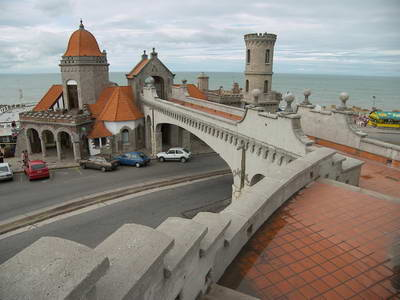
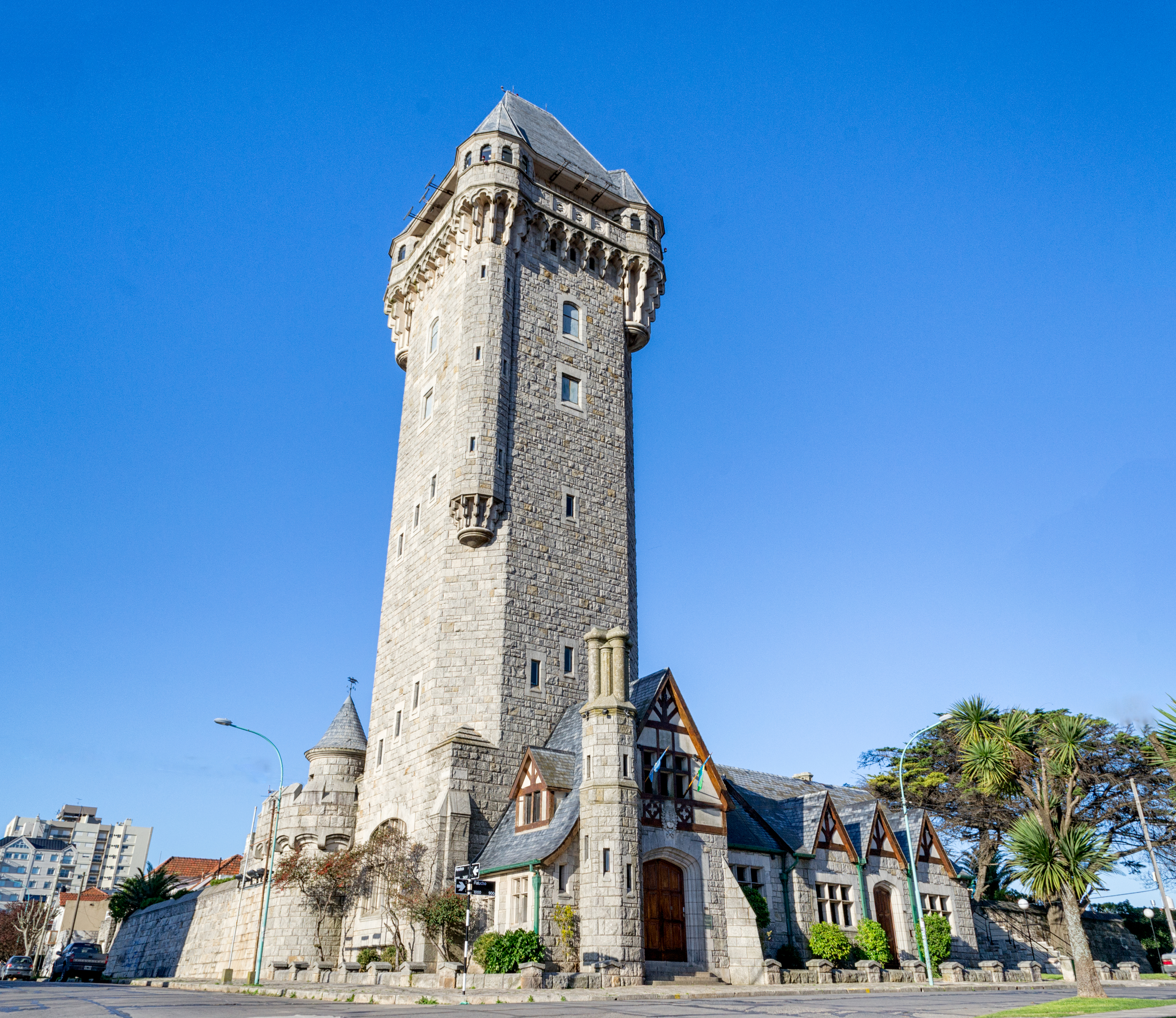
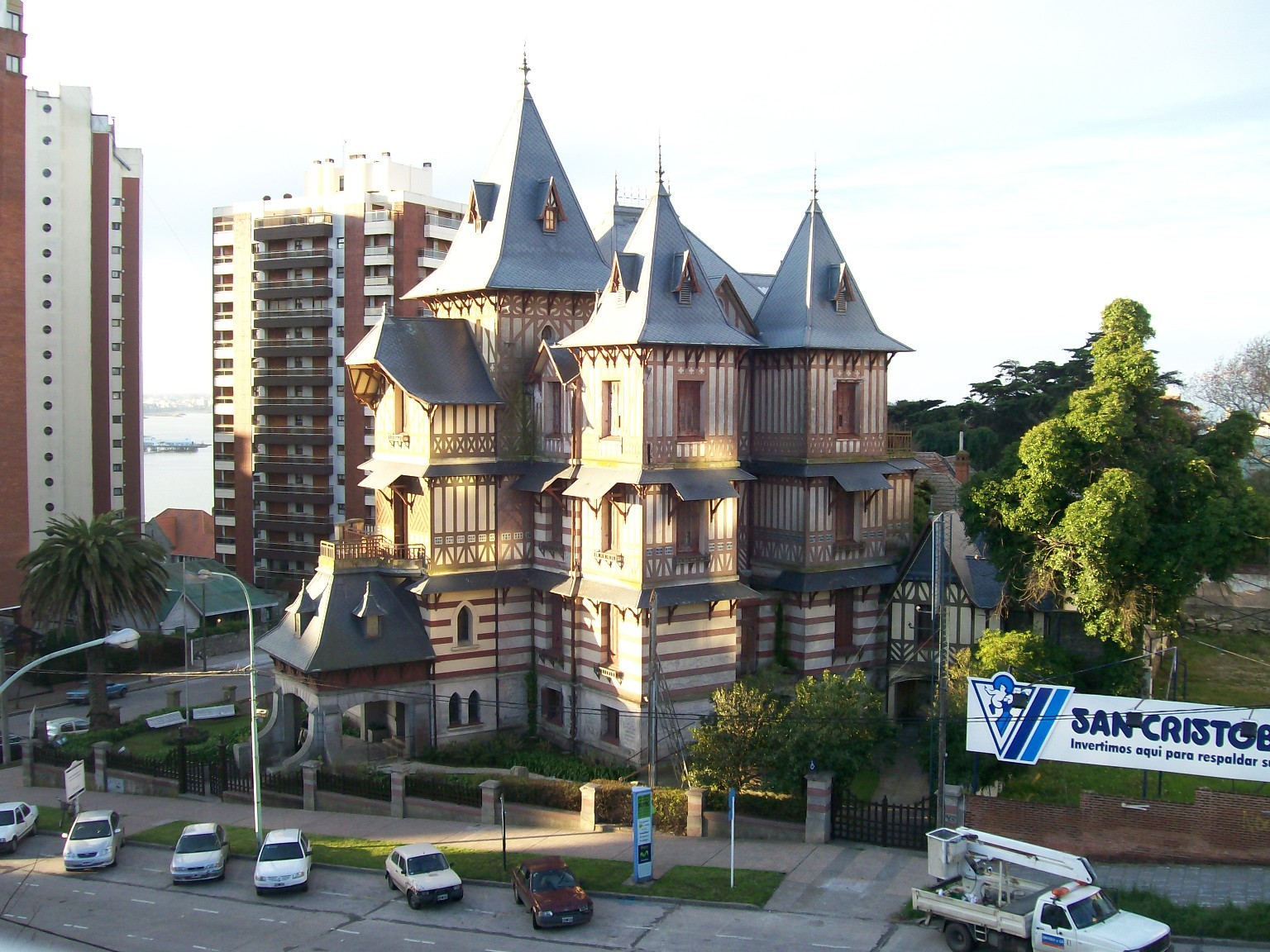
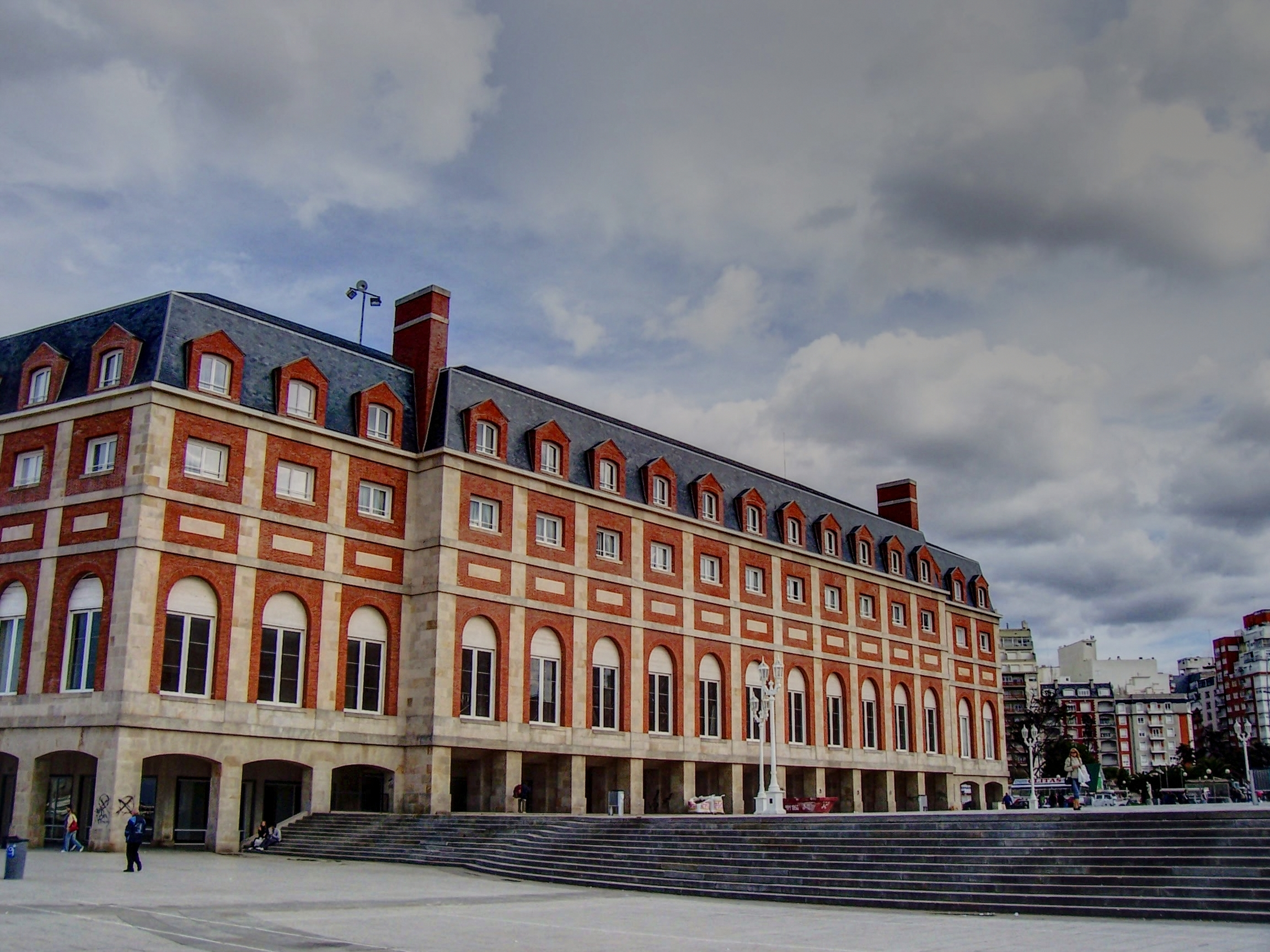
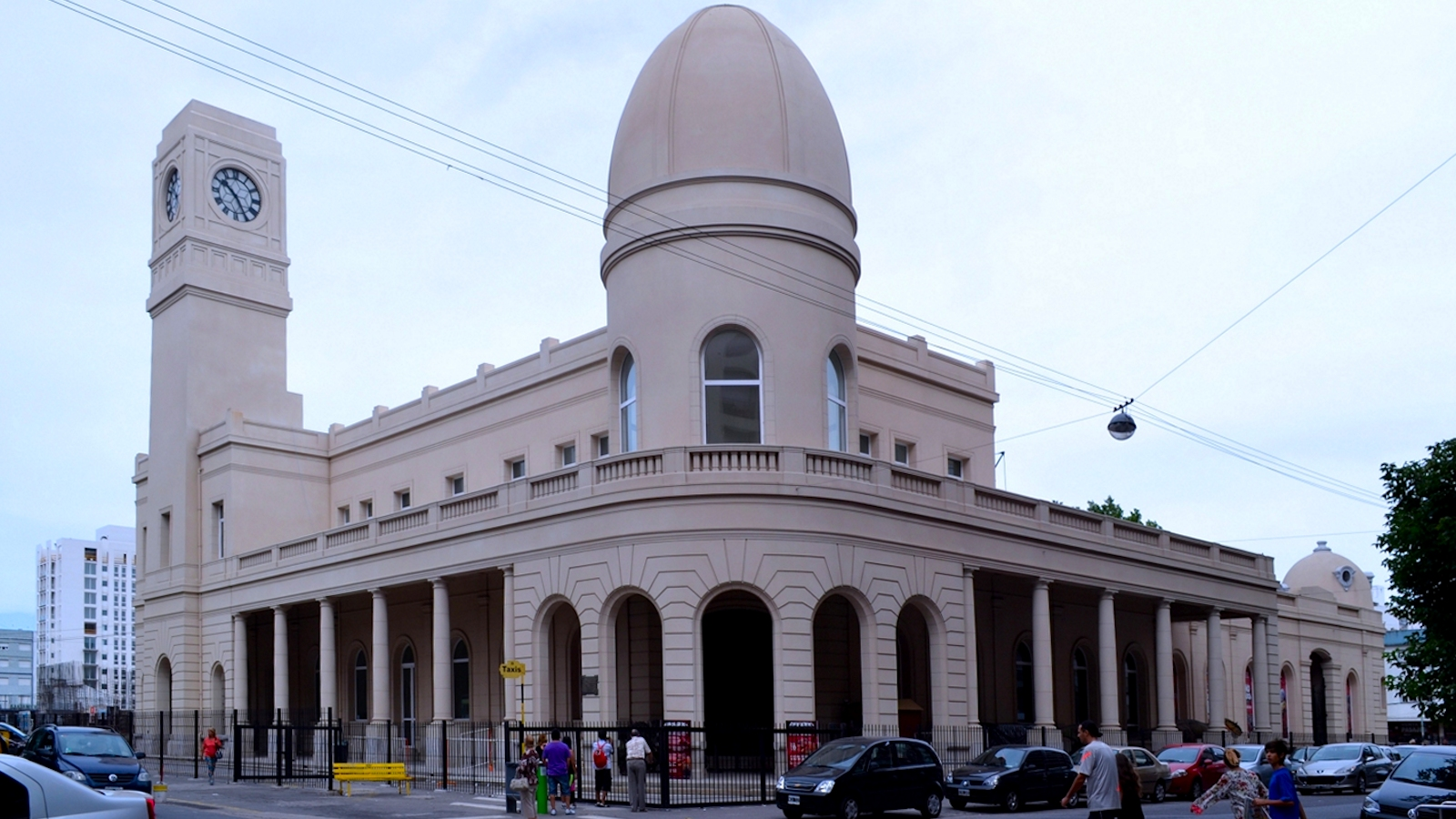
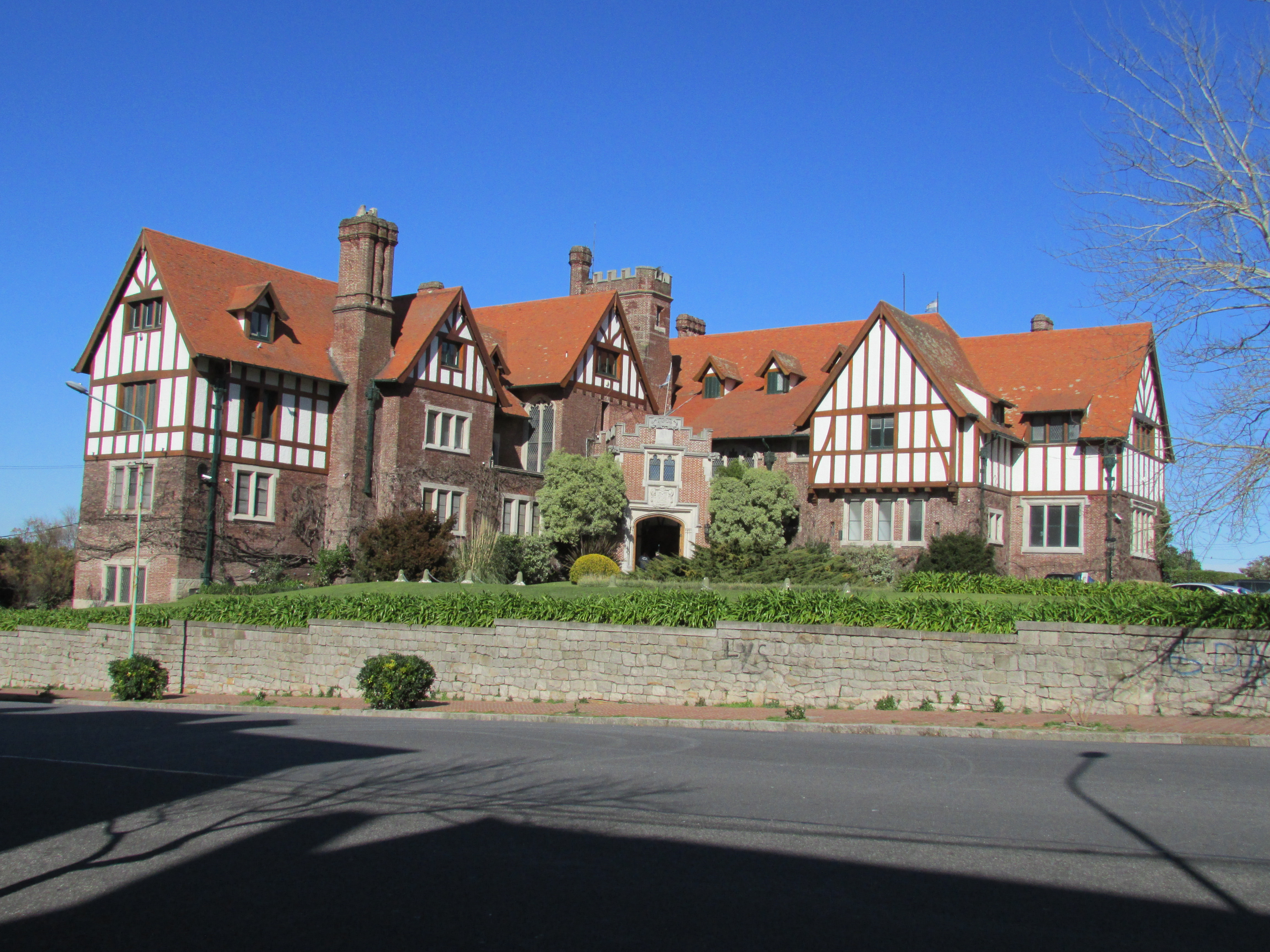
- Skyline of Mar del Plata Torreón del Monje Torre Tanque Castagnino Museum Casino Central Mar del Plata Sud railway station Golf Club Chalet
- Nicknames: La Feliz (The Happy [One]), Mardel, La Perla del Atlántico (The Pearl of the Atlantic)
- Location in Argentina Mar del Plata (Buenos Aires Province)
- Coordinates: 38°0′0″S 57°33′0″W
- Country: Argentina
- Province: Buenos Aires
- Partido: General Pueyrredón
- Founded: February 10, 1874

Government
  - Intendant: Guillermo Montenegro

Area
  - Total: 79.48 km^{2} (30.69 sq mi)
- Elevation: 38 m (125 ft)

Population (2022 census)
  - Total: 682,605
  - Rank: 5th in Argentina
  - Density: 8,588/km^{2} (22,240/sq mi)
  - Demonym: Marplatense
- Time zone: UTC−3 (ART)
- Postal code: 7600
- Phone code: +54 223
- Climate: Cfb
- Website: mardelplata.gob.ar

Mar del Plata is a city of the Atlantic Coast, in Buenos Aires Province, Argentina. It is the seat of General Pueyrredón district. Mar del Plata is the second largest city in Buenos Aires Province. The name "Mar del Plata" is short for "Mar del Río de la Plata," and means "sea of the Río de la Plata basin" or "adjoining sea to the (River) Plate region." Mar del Plata is one of the major fishing ports and the biggest seaside beach resort in Argentina. With a population of 682,605 as per the 2022 census [INDEC], it is the 5th largest city in Argentina.

== History ==
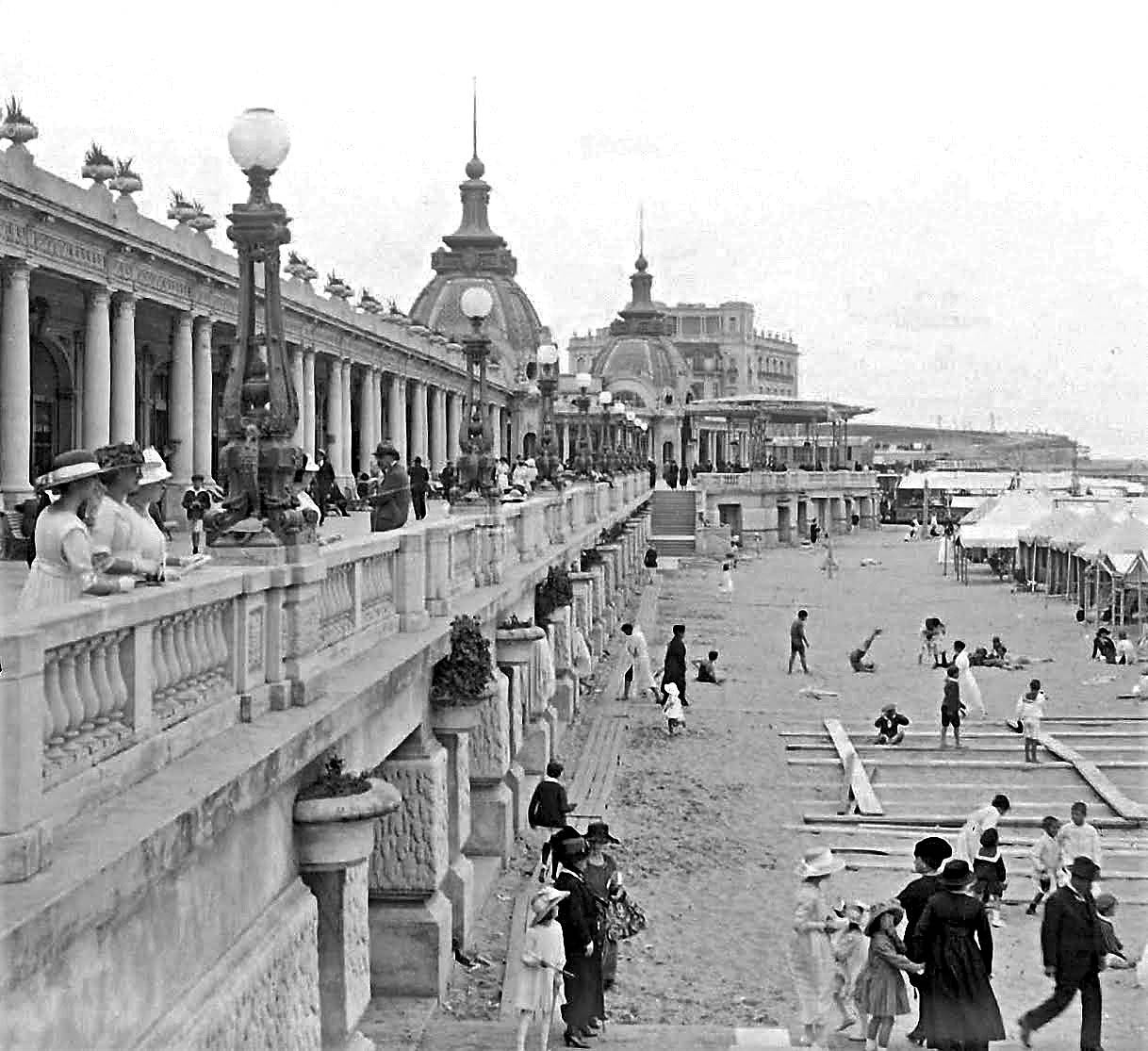
People on the second rambla of Playa Bristol (c.1920).

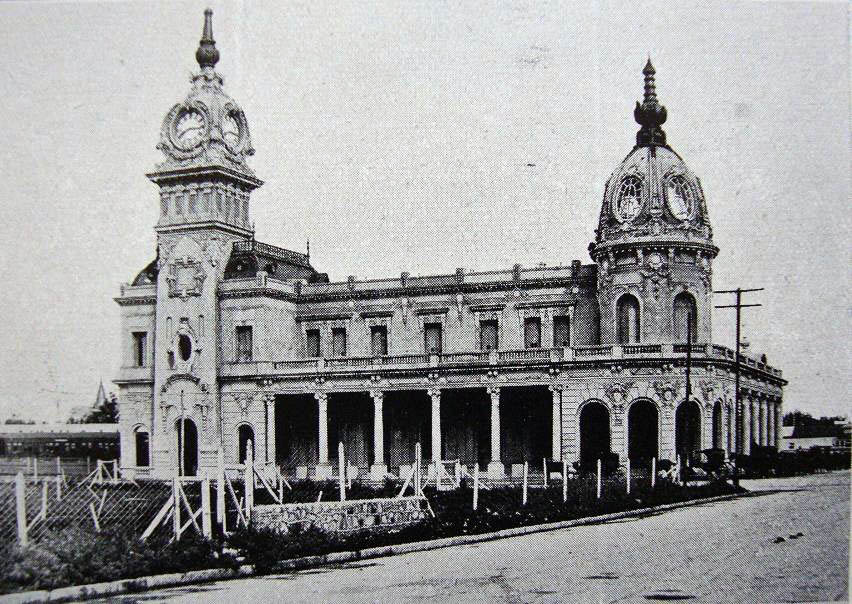
The Mar del Plata Sud railway station (c.1910) closed in 1949 and was later damaged by fire. It underwent a major restoration in the 2010s, but the upper part, which lost its decoration after the fire, remains unadorned.

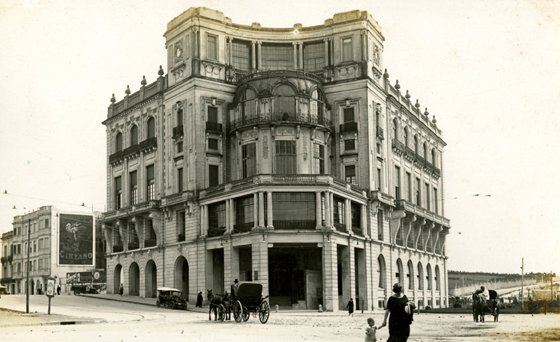
The Club Mar del Plata burned down in 1961, and was never rebuilt.

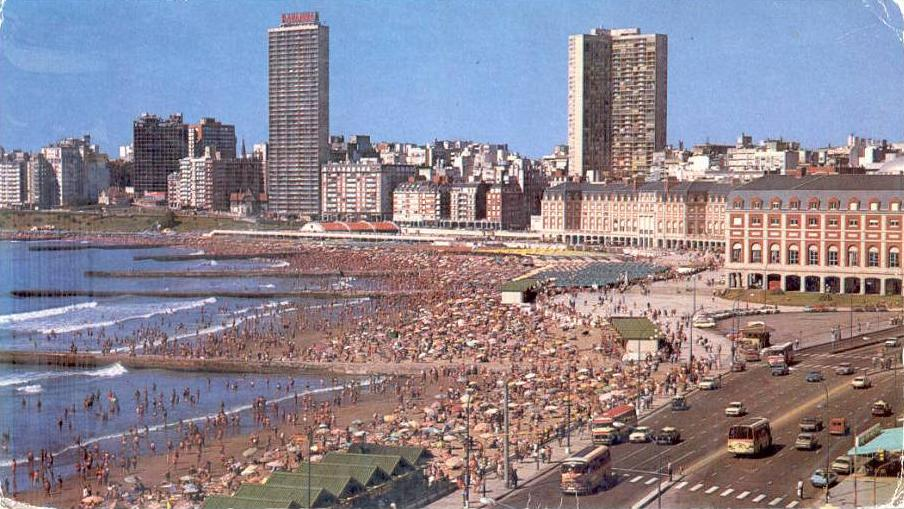
From the 1950s to the 1970s, there was a construction boom in the city.

Pre-Spanish era: The region was inhabited by Günuna Kena nomads (also known as northern Tehuelche). After the 11th century they were strongly influenced by the Mapuche culture.

1519–1857: First European explorers. The Portuguese explorer Ferdinand Magellan, in the service of the Spanish Crown, was the first European to come into contact with Punta Mogotes, in the southern part of Mar del Plata's coast, during his voyage toward the strait that bears his name. Sir Francis Drake made a reconnaissance of Cabo Corrientes and its sea lion colonies in 1577; Don Juan de Garay explored the area by land a few years later, in 1581. The Tehuelche were largely untouched by Spanish colonization because they were distant from major areas of settlement.

In 1742, during the War of Jenkins' Ear, eight survivors of HMS Wager, part of Admiral Anson expedition and led by midshipman Isaac Morris, lived through a ten-month ordeal before being captured by the Tehuelche. The indigenous people eventually passed the captives on to the Spaniards. After holding the Englishmen as prisoners, the Spanish returned Morris and his surviving companions to London in 1746. The first colonization attempt in 1751 by the Jesuit Order near Laguna de los Padres ended in disaster.

1857–1874: The Portuguese entrepreneur José Coelho de Meirelles, taking advantage of the country's abundance of wild cattle, built a pier and a factory to produce and export salted meat near Cabo Corrientes, but the business lasted only a few years.

1874–1886: Patricio Peralta Ramos acquired the now abandoned factory along with the surrounding terrain, and founded the town on February 10, 1874. Basque rancher Pedro Luro bought a part of Peralta Ramos land for agricultural production. First docks also erected around this time.

1886–1911: The railway line from Buenos Aires, built by the Buenos Aires Great Southern reached Mar del Plata in 1886; the first hotels were founded around the station stop. Upper-class people from Buenos Aires traveled by train to become the first tourists of the developing seaside village. They also established a local government that reflected their conservative ideals. Gradually a French style resort was built.

On 19 July 1907, the provincial legislature approved a bill that declared Mar del Plata as a city.

1911–1930: The residents, mostly newly arrived emigrants from Europe, demanded and obtained control of the Municipality administration. In this period socialists were the mainstream political force; they carried out social reforms and public investment. The main port was built and inaugurated in 1916.

1930–1946: A military coup reinstated the Conservative hegemony in national politics through electoral fraud and corruption. At the local levels officials were quite progressive; their policies viewed as a continuity of the socialist trend. In 1932, the construction of National Route 2 was completed, which connected Mar del Plata to Buenos Aires. Before this, a dirt road connected Mar del Plata to Buenos Aires via a different route, which required almost two days to travel by car. The seaside Casino complex opened in 1939, designed by architect Alejandro Bustillo, dates from this period.

1946–1955: Birth of the Peronist movement.

A coalition between socialists and radicals defeated this new party by a narrow margin in Mar del Plata, but by 1948 Peronism came to dominate the local administration. Massive tourism, triggered by the welfare politics of Perón and the surge of the middle class, contributed to marked growth in the city's economy.

1955–1970: After the fall of Perón, during which the city was the subject of a naval bombardment, the socialists regained the upper hand in local politics. The city reached a peak in activities like the construction business and building industry. The jobs attracted numerous emigrants from other regions of Argentina.

1970–1989: A slight decline in tourism was counterbalanced by the increase of other industries such as fishing and machinery. There was general infrastructure renewal under the military rule. The centrist Radical Civic Union became the main political force after the return of Democracy in 1983.

1989–2010: Though Peronism replaced the radicals in central government amid a national financial crisis, the latter party continued to rule in Mar del Plata. Some resurgence of mass tourism in the early '90s was followed by a deep social crisis in town, with an increase of poverty, jobless rates and emigration. By contrast, the first decade of the 21st century showed quick recovery in all sectors of the ailing economy.

In November 2005 the city hosted the 4th Summit of the Americas.

== Economy ==
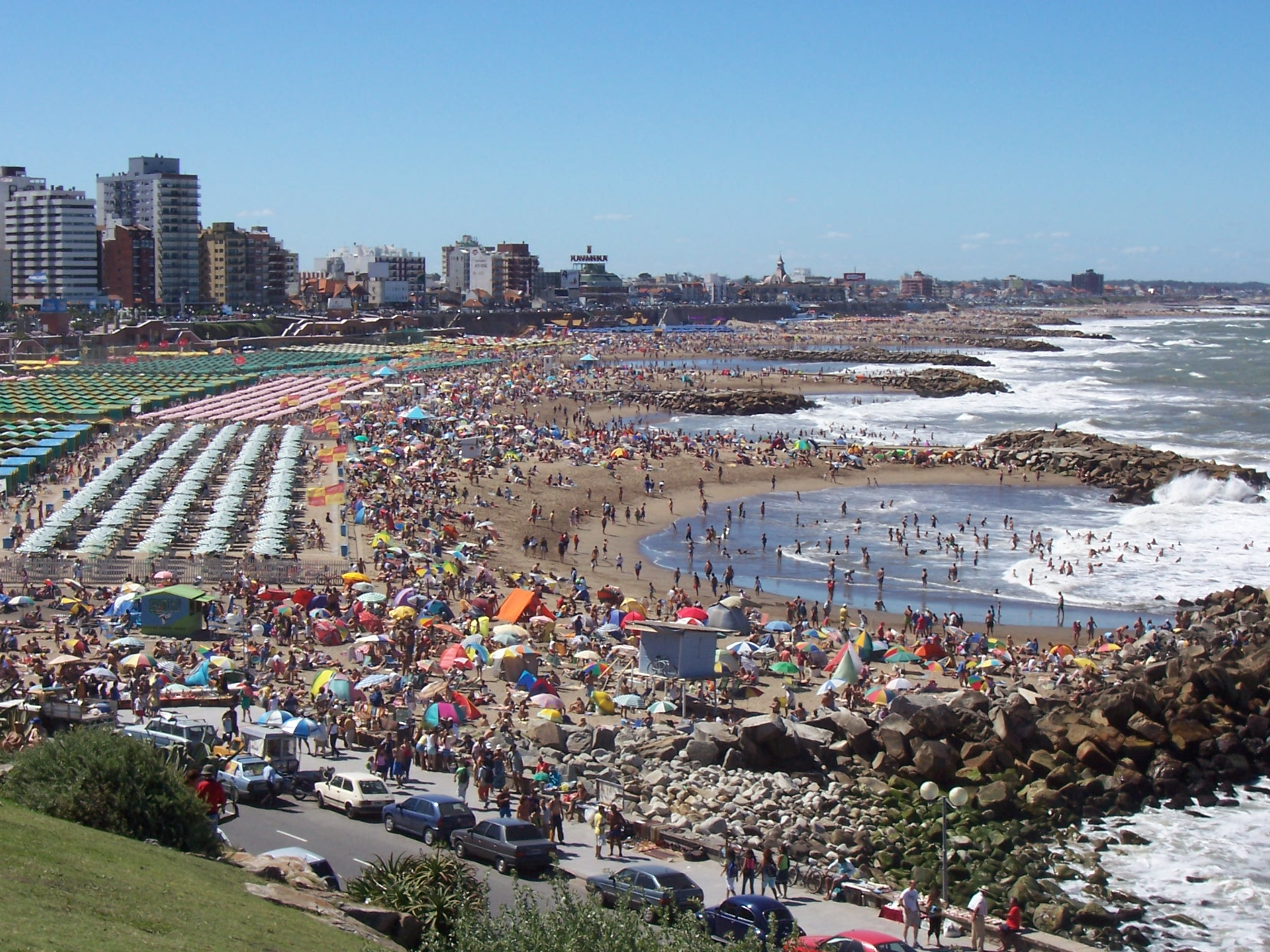
One of the beaches of Mar del Plata during summer tourism season

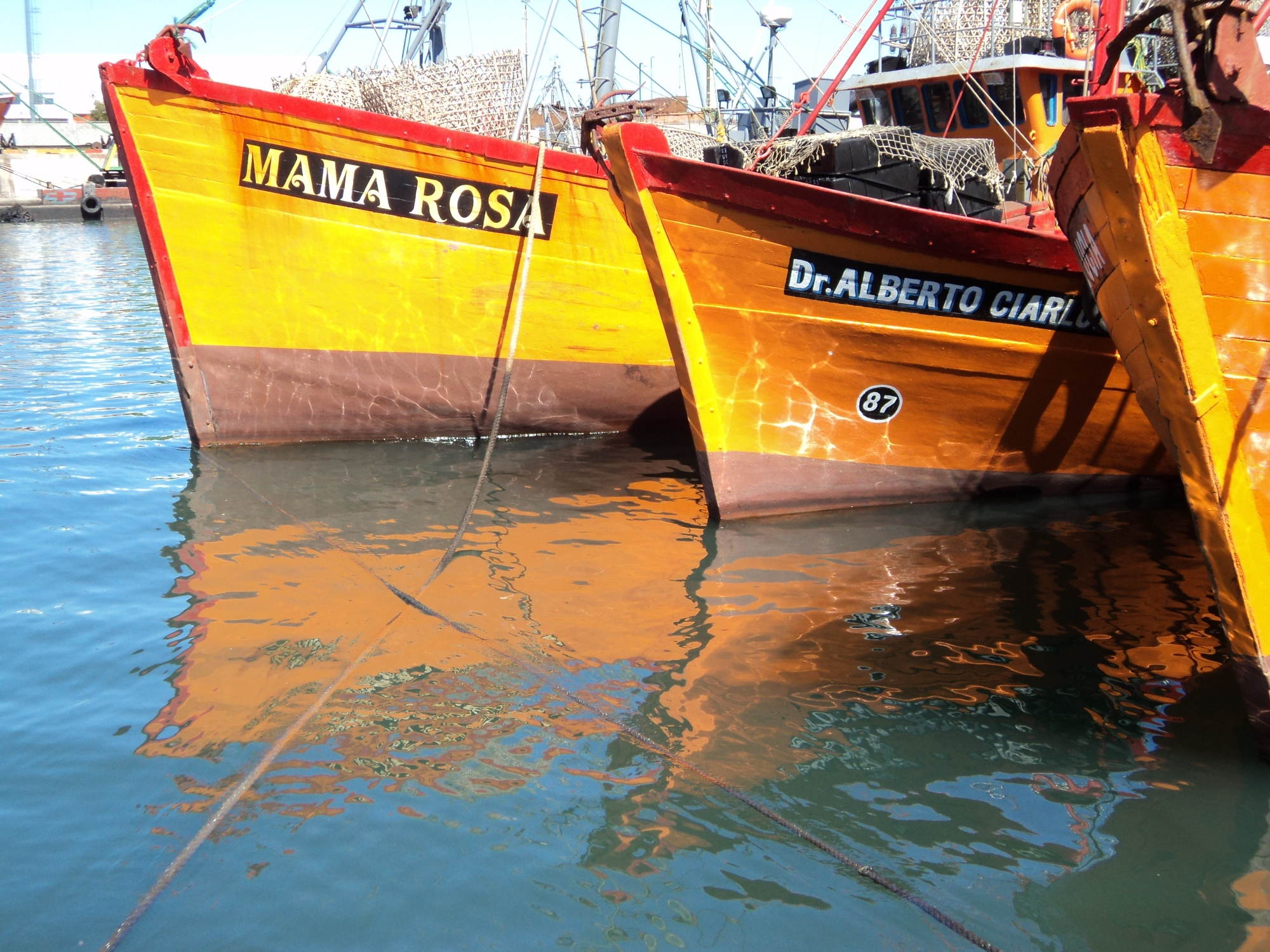
Typical wooden fishing boats at the port of Mar del Plata, known as Lanchas Amarillas

As part of the Argentine recreational coast, tourism is Mar del Plata's main economic activity, with over eight million tourists visiting the city in annually. Mar del Plata has a sophisticated tourist infrastructure with numerous hotels, restaurants, casinos, theatres and other tourist attractions. Mar del Plata is also an important sports centre with a multi-purpose Olympic style stadium (first used for the 1978 World Cup and later upgraded for the 1995 Pan American Games), five golf courses and many other facilities.

As an important fishing port, industry concentrates on fish processing and at least two large shipyards.

The area is also host to other light industry, such as textile, food manufacturing and polymers. There is a well-developed packaging machines industry, its quality being recognized in international markets. One of these companies was one of the pioneers in the automatic packaging of tea bags, exporting its original machine-designs abroad. Another company also exports its products and has sold royalties to other countries.

During the mid-1980s, Mar del Plata saw the birth of electronics factories, focused mostly on the telecommunications field, with two of them, Nexuscom and DelSat, succeeding in the international market. By the 2010s, a local technology company, PCBOX, was manufacturing and developing personal computers, tablet computers, smartphones and action-cams.

Also during the decade of 2010, the development of the software industry resulted in the formation of 92 companies and 440 microbusinesses. One of these companies, Making Sense, opened offices at San Antonio, Austin and Boston, in the United States. Along with the American COPsync, Inc, the company developed in 2013 the software for VidTac, an in-car video system for law enforcement, and the internet landing page application Lander, bought by the Silicon Valley company QuestionPro in 2016.

Since the 2000s, a local company builds and develops oil industry equipment, with customers in the United States, Russia, Oman and Egypt.

Located southwest of the city are quartzite quarries. The stone is traditionally used in construction. The large acreage of farms in the rural areas surrounding the city specialize mostly in the cultivation of vegetables.

In 2012, Mar del Plata became a wine-producing area, when a wine company from Mendoza province produced 20,000 barrels <--?--> from a vineyard at Chapadmalal beach. It processed such f grape varieties as Sauvignon blanc, Chardonnay, Riesling and Gewürztraminer. Since then, the local winery has turned into a tourist attraction. Microbeweries also flourished during the 2010s, amounting by 2016 to one-third of the national production.

Although the area had suffered from a high rate of unemployment from 1995 to 2003, Mar del Plata had 46,000 new jobs created from the third quarter of 2003 to the third quarter of 2008, representing an increase of 22%.

The 2008 Davis Cup Final was held in Mar del Plata. After being shut for a decade, the Gran Hotel Provincial (one of the largest hotels in Argentina) was renovated and reopened in 2009 by the Madrid-based NH Hotels.

Mar del Plata continues to lead Argentina's room availability: of 440,000 registered hotel rooms nationwide. In early 2009, the city was home to nearly 56,000 (5,000 more rooms than in Buenos Aires city).

== Transportation ==
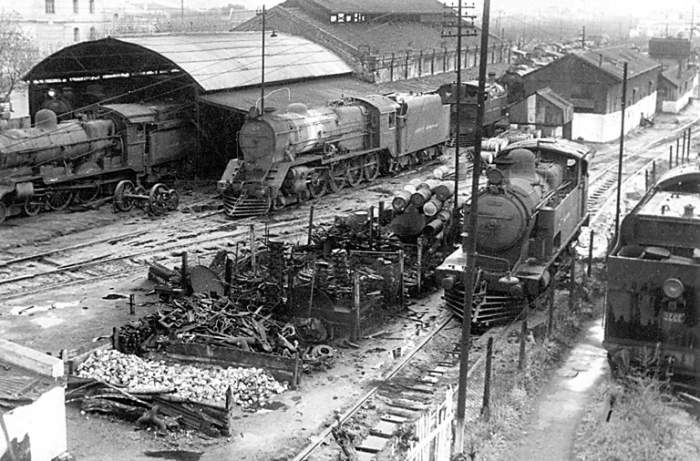
The old Mar del Plata railway station in 1910

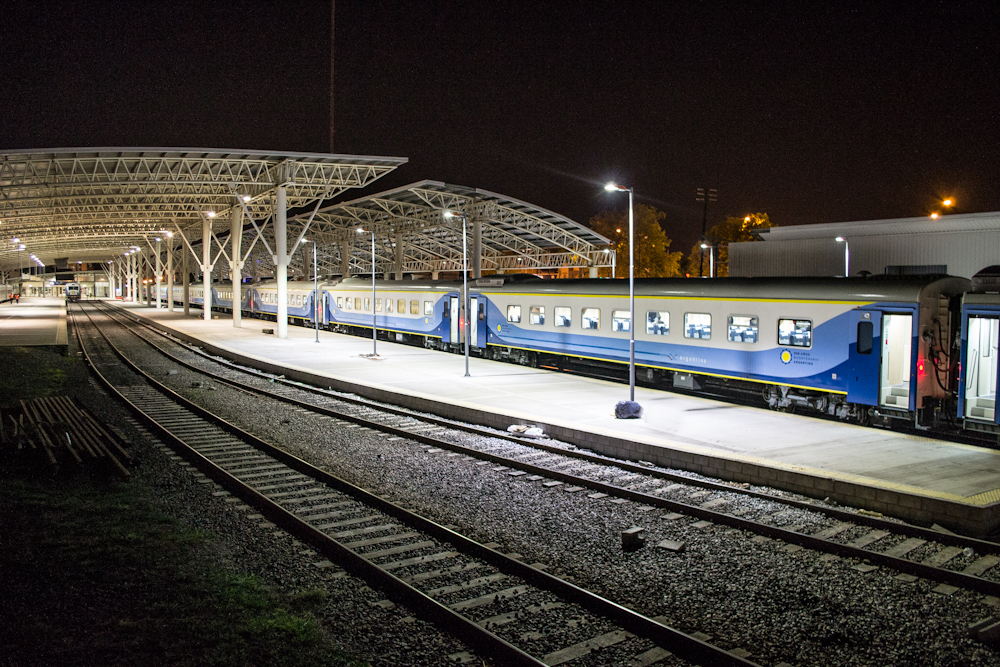
Trains at Mar del Plata railway and bus station, opened in 2011

Mar del Plata is served by Astor Piazzolla International Airport (MDQ/SAZM) with daily flights to Buenos Aires served by Aerolíneas Argentinas and weekly flights to Patagonia served by LADE.

Due to the COVID-19 pandemic, flights were reduced just to two daily flights to Buenos Aires served by Aerolineas Argentinas.

Highway 2 connects Mar del Plata with Buenos Aires and Route 11 connects it through the coastline, ending at Miramar, 40 km (25 mi) south of Mar del Plata. Route 88 connects to Necochea and Route 226 to Balcarce, Tandil and Olavarría.

The city has a bus and train station serving most cities in Argentina. There are two daily trains to Buenos Aires' Constitución station using new trains operated by Trenes Argentinos. These services are part of the General Roca Railway, owned by the government company Nuevos Ferrocarriles Argentinos.

Railway stations in Mar del Plata
Station	Builder	Operating	Status	Operator/s
Mar del Plata Norte	BA Great Southern	1886-2011	Closed ^{(1)}	BA Great Southern (1896-1948); Ferrocarriles Argentinos (1948-1993); Ferrobaires (1993-2011)
Mar del Plata Sur	BA Great Southern	1910-1949	Closed ^{(2)}	BA Great Southern (1910-1948); Ferrocarriles Argentinos (1948-1949)
Railway & Bus	Trenes Argentinos	2011–present	Active	Trenes Argentinos (2011–present)

Notes

- ^{(1)} Its tracks were extended to connect with the bus terminal opened in 2009, also building new train platforms.
- ^{(2)} Operated as the bus terminal of the city until 2009.

== Culture ==
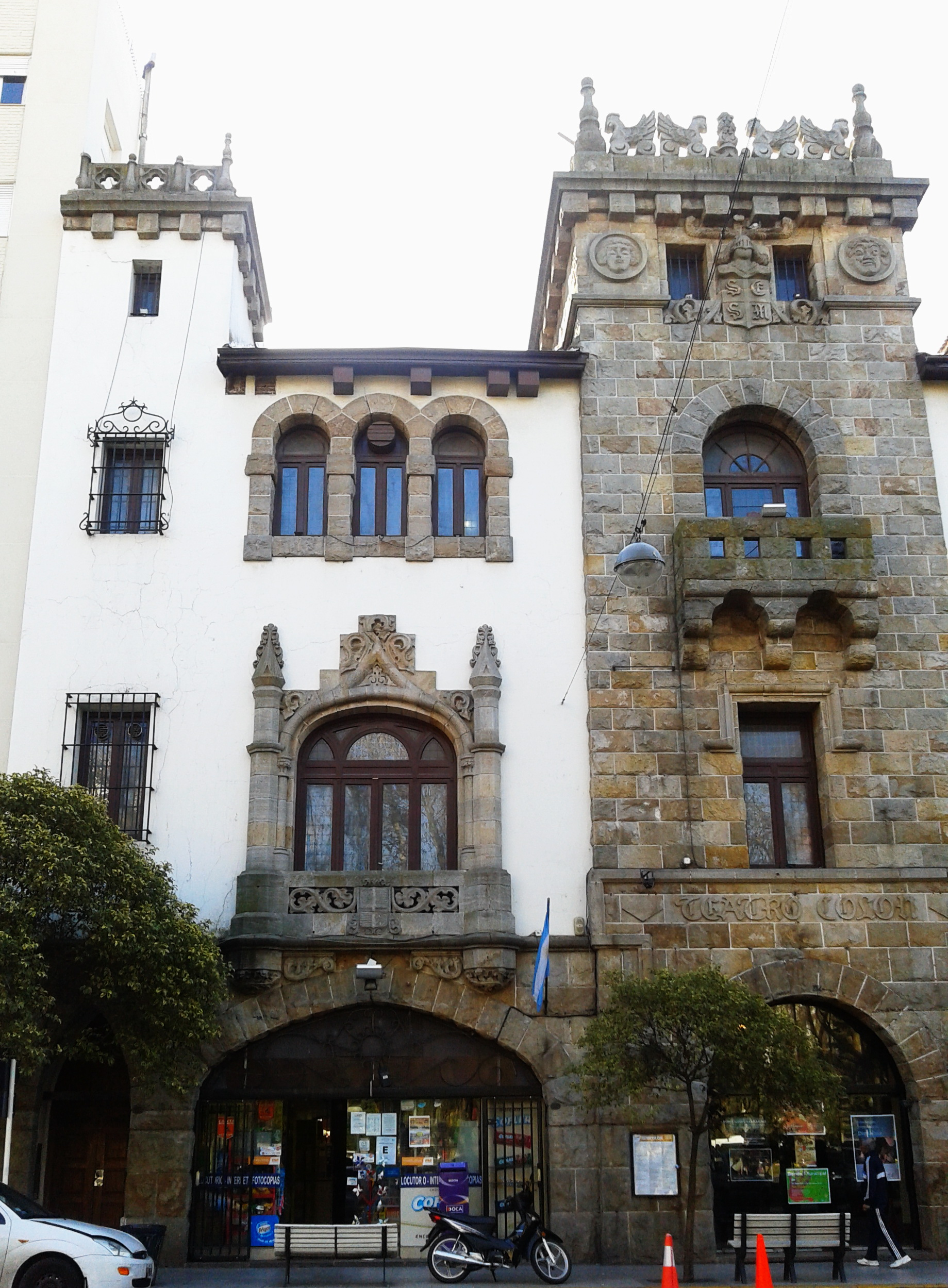
Colón Theatre

Mar del Plata is the most popular destination for conventions in Argentina after Buenos Aires. Mar del Plata has a wide range of services in this sector. The summer season hosts over fifty theatrical plays.

=== Interreligious Circuit ===
The city has, for those who do religious tourism, an interesting interreligious circuit that includes a visit among Catholics, in addition to the Cathedral, the Schoenstatt Sanctuary, the “Christ” of the South Jetty, a replica of the Lourdes Grotto, the Chapels of Stella Maris and Santa Cecilia, of other cults is the Russian Orthodox Church of Mar del Plata, represented by the Church of the Royal Saints and Martyrs; it is consecrated to Czar Nicholas II and his family, killed by the Bolsheviks in 1918. The Muslim community opens the doors of the Sunni Mosque of the Muslim community. For its part, the Jewish community offers visits to the Gabriel Temple.

=== Shows and festivals ===
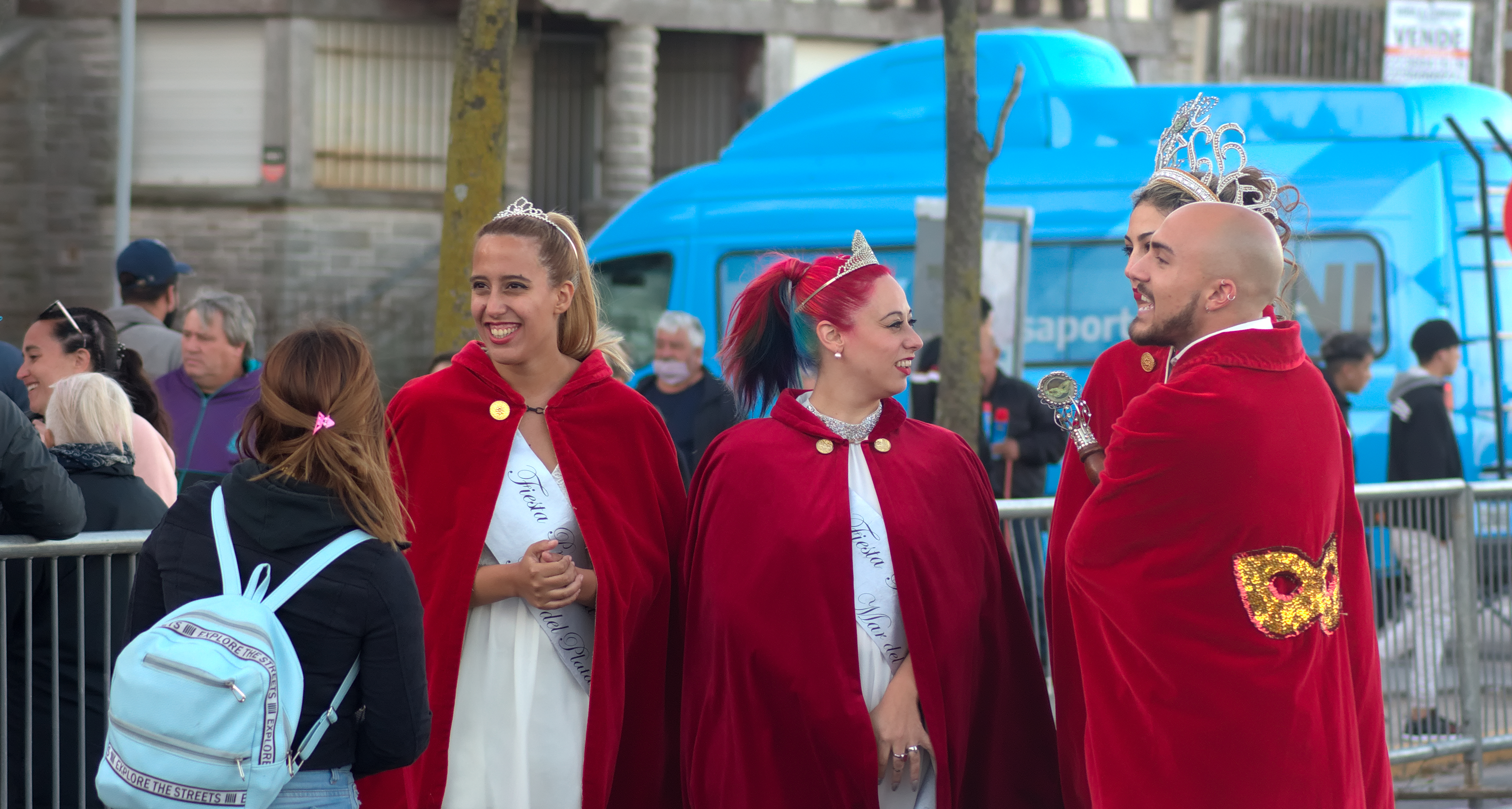
Carnival 2022 participants in Mar del Plata

- The Mar del Plata International Film Festival, the only A-class accredited film festival in Latin America.
- The Fiesta Nacional del Mar ("National Sea Festival") with the election and coronation of the Sea Queen and her princesses, which takes place in December as the official inauguration of the summer season.
- The Premios Estrella de Mar ("Sea Star Awards") which honor the best stage plays and shows of the season.
- The Valencian Falles week, a local reenactment of the Valencian event conducted by the Valencian community.
- The Mar del Plata Fashion Show, along with a number of fashion parades that gathers the best haute couture designers.
- The Fiesta Nacional de los Pescadores (National Fishermen's Festival), a colourful display of seafarers' tradition and cuisine.
- Mar del Plata has also hosted the 1995 Pan American Games, the 2001 Rugby World Cup Sevens, the 2003 Parapan American Games, the 2005 FIBA Under-21 World Championship, and co-hosted the 1978 FIFA World Cup and the 2001 FIFA World Youth Championship.
- Since 1987 Mar del Plata annually hosts the Mar del Plata Marathon, in early December.
- The 38th and 53rd International Mathematical Olympiad was held in Mar del Plata in 1997 and 2012.
- The Festival Internacional de Poesia del Atlantico International Poetry Festival of the Atlantic, is an international poetry festival. It began in 2013 and for its second edition in 2014 it gathered more than 210 poets from Argentina, Uruguay, Mexico, Iran, Chile, Peru and Cuba. It's part of the Moviento Poetico Mundial World Poetry Movement.
- The Prosa Mutante is a cycle of literary experiences and arts collective established in January 2013 that takes place since then every Thursday from 20:00 at Piano Bar in which stage over 100 local, national and international artists have performed.

The local Government sponsors a Symphonic Orchestra.

=== Nightlife ===
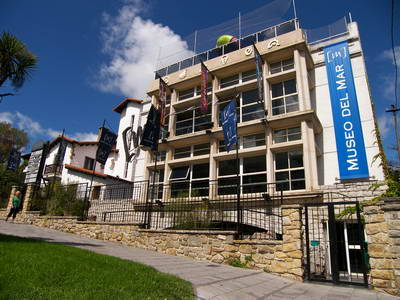
The Museum of the Sea, opened in 2000 and closed in 2012; it held a collection of over 30,000 sea shells, among other specimens

Mar del Plata has a wide variety of clubs located by district: the area of Escollera Norte (known for its quantity of pubs and nightclubs) and Constitution Avenue.

=== Museums ===
- The Juan Carlos Castagnino Municipal Museum of Art.
- The Museum of the Port of Mar del Plata Cleto Ciocchini.
- The Museum of Contemporary Art MAR.
- The Museum of Natural Science Lorenzo Scaglia, specialized in Paleontology of the Quaternary species around the region.
- The Mar del Plata Museum of the Sea, which included one of the most complete collections of sea snails of the World. The museum has been closed to the public since September 2012.
- Villa Victoria, a vintage wooden house, the former residence of the late writer Victoria Ocampo, now a place for art expositions and classical music.
- The Submarine Force Museum, located close to the Mar del Plata Naval Base.

== Architecture ==
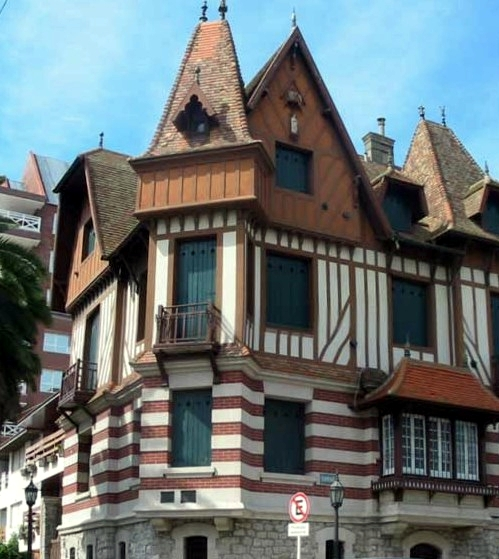
Villa Normandy, built in 1919

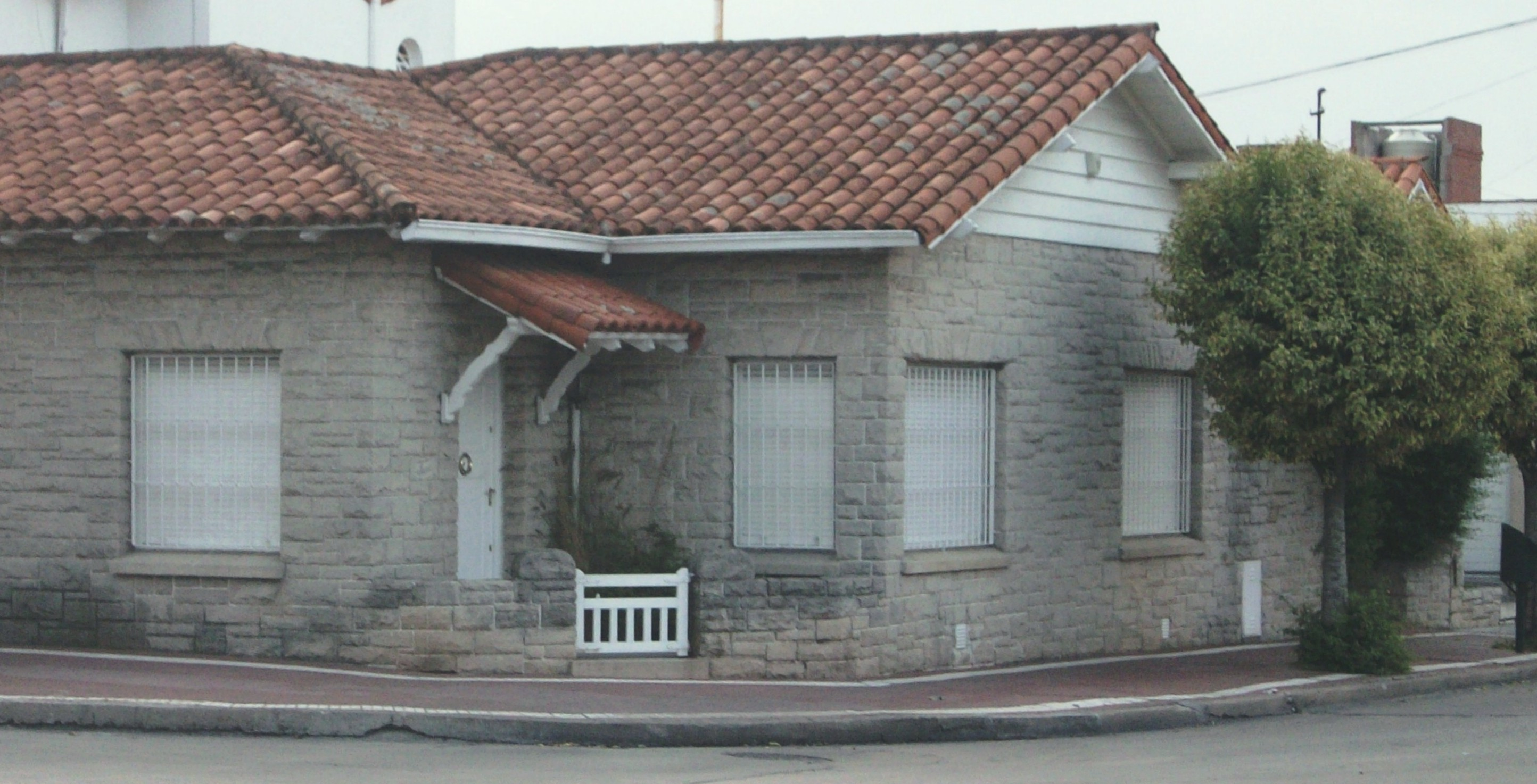
An example of "Mar del Plata Style" house

The development of the city as a seasonal summer resort in the early 20th century led upper class tourists from Buenos Aires to build a European-inspired architecture, based mainly on the picturesque and later on the art deco styles. This gave Mar del Plata the nickname of the Argentine Biarritz. The building industry became the main non-seasonal activity of the town by 1920.

During the 1930s, 1940s, and beyond, local architects and builders, like Auro Tiribelli, Arturo Lemmi, Alberto Córsico-Picollini and Raúl Camusso recreated and transformed the picturesque values into a middle-class scale, marking the beginning of a vernacular architecture, called Mar del Plata Style, consisting in small samples of the luxury-laden summer residences of high society, built for the summer visitor as well as for the local resident.

These chalets were built with stone façades, gable roofs covered with Spanish or French tiles, prominent eaves and front porches. This gives the town some distinctive urban character compared with other Argentine cities, despite the fact that the growing mass of tourists in the '60s imposed the construction of large apartment buildings and skyscrapers as the predominant architectural style downtown.

== Notable people ==
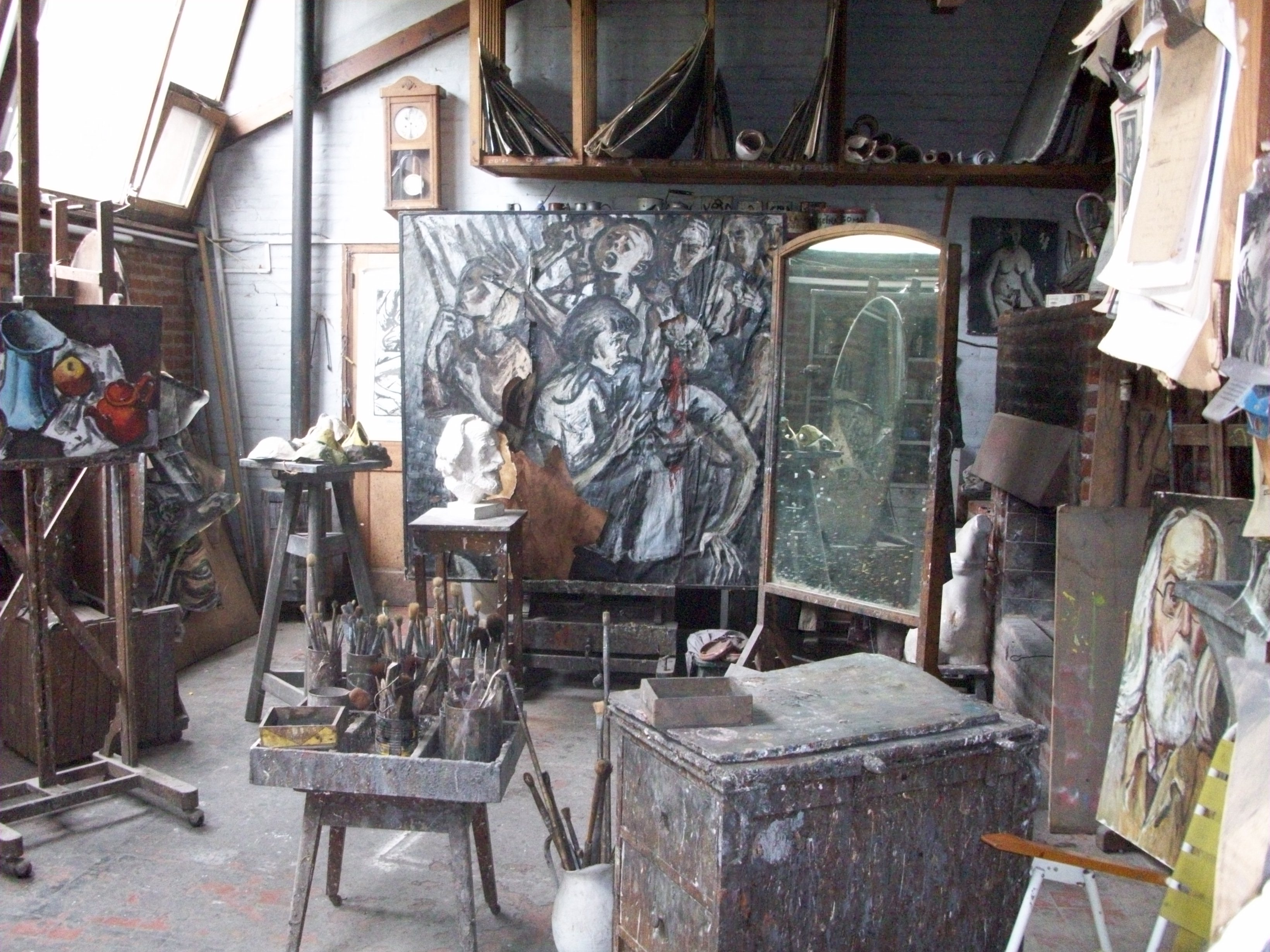
Alberto Bruzzone's workshop

- Gabriel Amato (born October 22, 1970), former international soccer player. Former forward of Boca Juniors, River Plate, Rangers FC and Grêmio.
- Inés Arrondo (born November 28, 1977), field hockey player, winner along with the national team of an Olympic silver medal in Sydney 2000, the bronze medal in Athens 2004 and the World Cup in 2002.
- Héctor Babenco (1946–2016), movie director of Hollywood films such as Kiss of the Spider Woman and Ironweed. Raised in Mar del Plata.
- Mario Benedetti (1945), electronics engineer, the main Argentine scientist involved in the Large Hadron Collider project. He is also the owner of Tío Curzio, one of the most fashionable restaurants in the city.
- Erica Vanessa Bibbó (1985), the first female commander of a naval unit in the Argentine navy.
- Amado Boudou (born November 19, 1962), former Vice President of Argentina.
- Alberto Bruzzone (1907–1994), painter, was born in San Juan but chose Mar del Plata as his home city.
- Germán Burgos (born April 16, 1969), former goalkeeper who played two World Cups. Currently, he is oriented to music.
- Macarena Achaga (born March 5, 1992), actress, model, and singer.
- Homero Cárpena (1910–2001), actor, playwright and filmmaker.
- Juan Carlos Castagnino (1908-1972), painter.

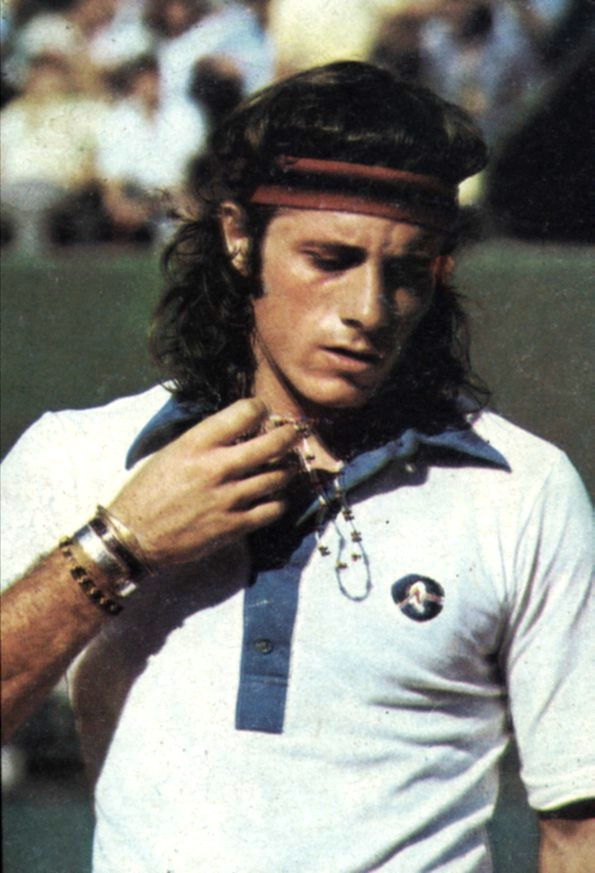
Guillermo Vilas near the peak of his career in 1975

- Francisco Comesaña, tennis player
- Juan Curuchet (born February 4, 1965), former road bicycle racer and track cyclist, winner of the Men's Madison gold medal at the 2008 Summer Olympics along with Walter Pérez.
- Martin Donovan (not to be confused with American actor Martin Donovan), Hollywood screenwriter and producer, co-author of the screenplay of movies like Death Becomes Her and Loving Couples.
- Laura Echarte, agricultural engineer, researcher in crop physiology studies, winner of a 2007 L'Oréal-Unesco international fellowship for Women.
- Juan Eduardo Esnáider (1973), international soccer player. Former forward of Espanyol de Barcelona, Atlético de Madrid, Juventus and River Plate.
- Nacha Guevara (1940), singer and actress.
- Carlos Enrique Díaz Sáenz Valiente (1917–1956), shooter, silver medalist at the 1948 Summer Olympics and World Champion in 1947.
- Jorge Lanata (1960-2024), journalist and writer.
- Mariano Mignini (born 1975), Argentine footballer.
- Maria Gabriela Palomo, marine biologist, also winner of the L'Oréal-Unesco junior award in 2003 for her works on port-areas environmental pollution.
- Ástor Piazzolla (1921-1992), composer and musician.
- Ricardo Piglia (1941–2017), writer born in Adrogué but raised in Mar del Plata.
- Alfonsina Storni (1892-1938), poet.
- Auro Tiribelli (1908–2006), architect, the main representative of the Mar del Plata style.
- Guillermo Vilas (1952), top-ten international tennis player, popularizer of the between-the-legs tweener shot, also called the Gran Willy after him.
- Selem Safar (1987), professional basketball player.
- Emi Buendía (1996), footballer currently playing for Aston Villa F.C.
- Sergio Torres (1981), former player and player assistance manager for Eastbourne Borough in National League South.
- Romina Malaspina (1994) Model, reality star, showgirl, influencer, television host, vedette, actress and journalist.
- Emiliano Martínez (1992), Football player for Chelsea F.C
- Franchu Feuillassier (1998), Football player for SD Eibar
- Shaiel Peters (2003) Archer, South American índoor Senior Champion, Argentinian Índoor Senior Champion and récord holder.
- Milton Martinez (1991), professional skateboarder and 2019 Thrasher Magazine Skateboarder of the Year.
- Marcos Siebert (1996), racing driver
- José Luis Di Palma (1966), racing driver
- Christian Ledesma (1976), racing driver
- Milagros Menéndez (1997), football player
- Roberto Mieres (1924–2012), racing driver

== Climate ==
Mar del Plata has an oceanic climate (Cfb, according to the Köppen climate classification), with humid and moderate summers and relatively cool winters, although polar air masses from Antarctica are frequent. The average daily mean temperature in January is 20.4 °C (69 °F). It is 7.5 °C (45 °F) in July. The West-Southwest winds can take the temperature below 0 °C (32 °F) between mid May and early October, while the Southeast ones (the so-called Sudestada) are stronger, producing coastal showers and rough seas, as well as strong squalls, but the cold is much less intense. There is fog in the last days of fall, and springtime is often marred by sea winds and sudden temperature changes.

A snowy winter's day at Playa Grande, July 10, 2004

The city's summer maximum temperatures fluctuate broadly around the average of 26 °C (79 °F): while there are many days between 30 °C (86 °F) and 35 °C (95 °F) (although less than in other areas of the Pampas region), strong on-shore or southerly winds can also keep temperatures closer to 20 °C (68 °F), and nights can sometimes be very cool even in midsummer (falling below 10 °C (50 °F) sometimes). However, the summer nights are usually cool to pleasant, with temperatures between 12 °C (54 °F) to 16 °C (61 °F). Traditionally, Easter is seen as the "last" weekend to go to the beach on the Argentine Atlantic Coast, and average maximum temperatures are around 22 °C (72 °F) at that time. While some years can have the last few days of about 30 °C (86 °F) around that time, it is also possible to experience daily highs of 15 °C (59 °F). Winter temperatures average 13 °C (55 °F) during the day and 4 °C (39 °F) at night; they sometimes climb to 22 °C (72 °F) especially in August, but there are also days where highs stay below 6 °C (43 °F) and temperatures fall some degrees below 0 °C (32 °F) at night.

Spring brings the most variable weather, with heat waves bringing highs of more than 30 °C (86 °F) followed by highs of 10 °C (50 °F) to 15 °C (59 °F) and perhaps a late-season frosty night all perfectly possible in October and November.

There are about six days of frost each year in the city center, and almost 27 recorded at the airport. The average dates for the first and last frost are May 23 and October 4 respectively. Snowfall, a phenomenon that takes place every six years or so, according to the 1960-2004 data, is not uncommon, but snow accumulation on the ground is rare. Among the best known such occurrences in the last decades were the 1975 and 1991 snowstorms, but there were also snow accumulations in 1994 and 1997 in the highest hills area of Sierra de los Padres, in 1995 along the southern coast; the other two during the first hours of July 10, 2004 and July 15, 2010, and again in Sierra de los Padres and the southern coast on September 11, 2015. There were flurries in September 1986, June 2007, July 2011 and August 2013.

The record high is 42.4 °C (108 °F) on January 14, 2022 while the record low is −9.3 °C (15 °F) on July 6, 1988. The wet season occurs between October and April, especially in summer (December to March), with values over 90 millimetres (3.5 in) in each of those months. The average annual rainfall is 926.1 millimetres (36 in).

Climate data for Mar del Plata (1991–2020, extremes 1888–present)
Month	Jan	Feb	Mar	Apr	May	Jun	Jul	Aug	Sep	Oct	Nov	Dec	Year
Record high °C (°F)	42.4 (108.3)	39.9 (103.8)	36.3 (97.3)	33.0 (91.4)	28.5 (83.3)	25.5 (77.9)	27.7 (81.9)	29.9 (85.8)	30.1 (86.2)	34.5 (94.1)	35.7 (96.3)	39.4 (102.9)	42.4 (108.3)
Mean daily maximum °C (°F)	26.4 (79.5)	25.5 (77.9)	23.8 (74.8)	20.4 (68.7)	16.9 (62.4)	13.8 (56.8)	12.6 (54.7)	14.7 (58.5)	15.9 (60.6)	18.6 (65.5)	21.7 (71.1)	25.2 (77.4)	19.6 (67.3)
Daily mean °C (°F)	20.3 (68.5)	19.7 (67.5)	18.1 (64.6)	14.6 (58.3)	11.4 (52.5)	8.5 (47.3)	7.5 (45.5)	9.0 (48.2)	10.4 (50.7)	13.2 (55.8)	15.9 (60.6)	18.8 (65.8)	14.0 (57.2)
Mean daily minimum °C (°F)	14.5 (58.1)	14.3 (57.7)	12.9 (55.2)	9.5 (49.1)	6.7 (44.1)	4.0 (39.2)	3.2 (37.8)	4.2 (39.6)	5.5 (41.9)	8.1 (46.6)	10.3 (50.5)	12.8 (55.0)	8.8 (47.8)
Record low °C (°F)	3.0 (37.4)	1.2 (34.2)	0.2 (32.4)	−3.6 (25.5)	−3.7 (25.3)	−8.0 (17.6)	−9.3 (15.3)	−6.4 (20.5)	−6.3 (20.7)	−3.0 (26.6)	−2.0 (28.4)	−0.2 (31.6)	−9.3 (15.3)
Average precipitation mm (inches)	91.1 (3.59)	103.6 (4.08)	95.2 (3.75)	97.3 (3.83)	60.0 (2.36)	66.1 (2.60)	57.8 (2.28)	63.6 (2.50)	63.1 (2.48)	83.1 (3.27)	80.3 (3.16)	84.8 (3.34)	946.0 (37.24)
Average precipitation days (≥ 0.1 mm)	8.1	8.0	9.0	9.3	8.2	8.7	9.4	8.0	8.3	10.0	9.8	8.2	105.0
Average snowy days	0.0	0.0	0.0	0.0	0.0	0.0	0.1	0.1	0.0	0.0	0.0	0.0	0.2
Average relative humidity (%)	73.9	77.2	79.5	79.9	82.0	81.6	81.8	79.5	78.6	77.7	75.4	72.7	78.3
Mean monthly sunshine hours	288.3	234.5	232.5	195.0	167.4	120.0	127.1	164.3	174.0	210.8	222.0	269.7	2,405.6
Percentage possible sunshine	63	60	54	58	51	41	42	46	47	51	52	59	52
Source 1: Servicio Meteorológico Nacional
Source 2: Meteo Climat (record highs and lows), Oficina de Riesgo Agropecuario (June record low only), UNLP (sun only 1971–1980)

Climate data for Mar del Plata
Month	Jan	Feb	Mar	Apr	May	Jun	Jul	Aug	Sep	Oct	Nov	Dec	Year
Average sea temperature °C (°F)	20.0 (68.0)	20.6 (69.1)	20.0 (68.0)	18.0 (64.4)	15.6 (60.1)	13.0 (55.4)	11.1 (52.0)	10.6 (51.1)	10.9 (51.6)	12.5 (54.5)	14.9 (58.8)	17.6 (63.7)	15.4 (59.7)
Source: Climate Data "Clima Mar del Plata" (in Spanish). Climate Data.

== Government ==
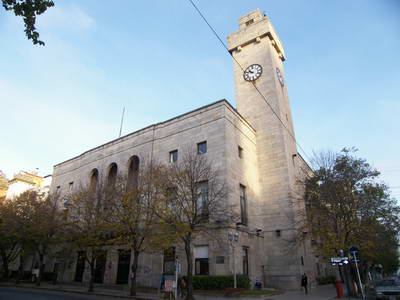
City Hall

Mar del Plata is the head of the department of General Pueyrredón. The current mayor of the city and department is Guillermo Montenegro, of the Juntos por el Cambio party.

The town council has some legislative powers. The term of office for both the mayor and council members is four years.

In 1919, Mar del Plata became the first town in South America to have a Socialist Mayor, a son of Italian Immigrants, Teodoro Bronzini. The Socialist Party would dominate the city political landscape for most of the 20th century.

Mar del Plata has had 109 Mayors and Commissioners from 1881 to the present.

There is a work by the American political scientist Susan Stokes about the democratic process in Mar del Plata since 1983 in comparison to other regions of Argentina. One of the main theses of her articles is that the social and economic development of Mar del Plata was quite atypical, with a strong prevalence of middle-class values that discouraged the policy of clientelism that is the common background in other urban environments of Argentina.

== Education ==
The area has many schools and universities, both private and public. It once had a German school, Johann-Gutenberg-Schule. There is a wide variety of art schools:

- Universidad Nacional de Mar del Plata (UNMdP): public university with various majors.
- Escuela de Artes Visuales Martín A Malharro: A higher education school based on modern visual arts with graduate departments of graphic design, photography, illustration, teacher education, scenography and film.
- Polivalente de Arte (Escuela de Educación Secundaria Especializada en Arte Nº 1): school of secondary education that also works as a vocational school in the fields of Art, Music or Dance.

Also, there are two conservatories (classical and popular music), a vocational school of art, and a municipal school of classical and modern dance.

== Media ==
=== Television ===
- Channel 10, Mar del Plata

== Sport ==
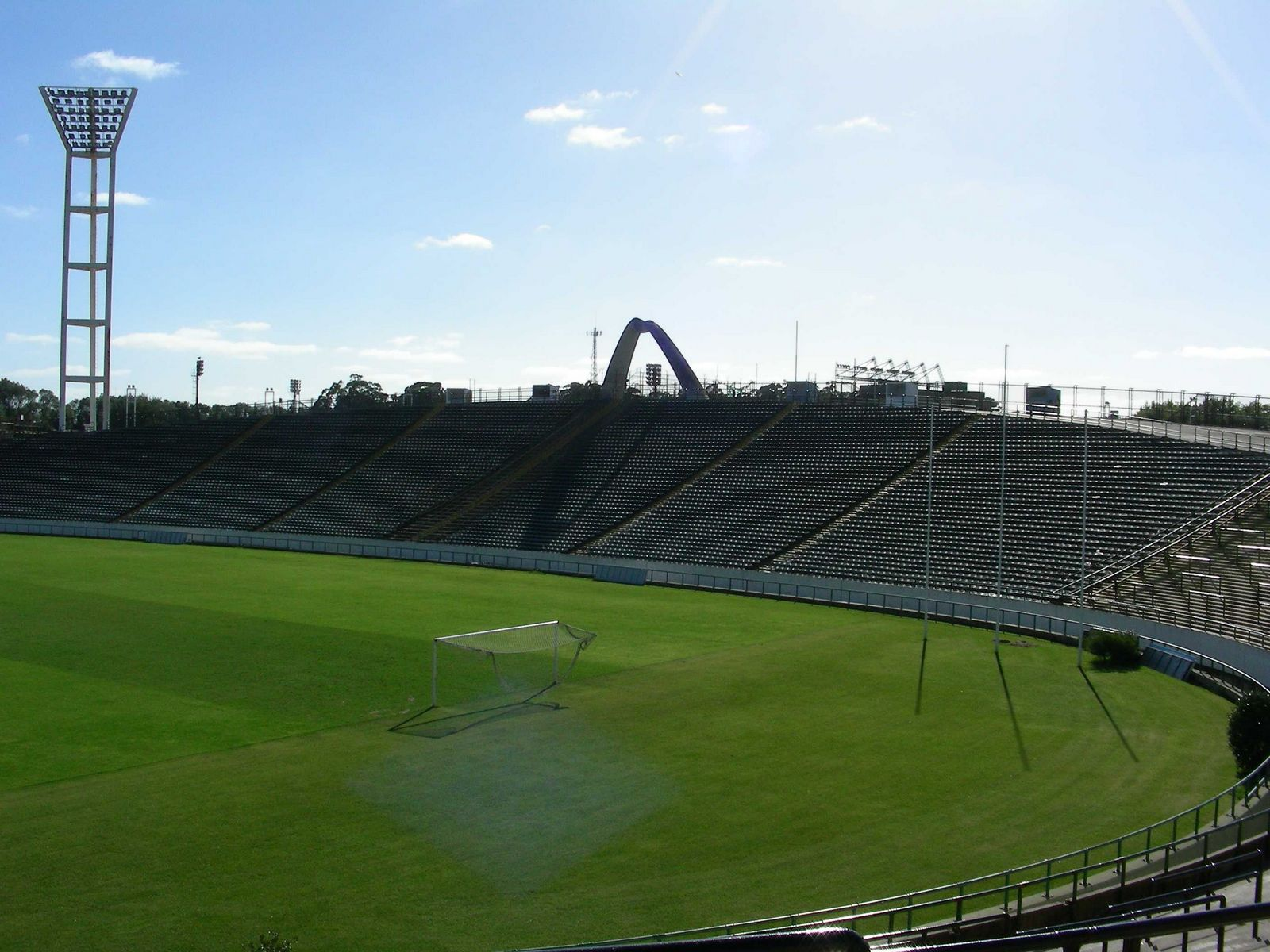
Estadio José María Minella.

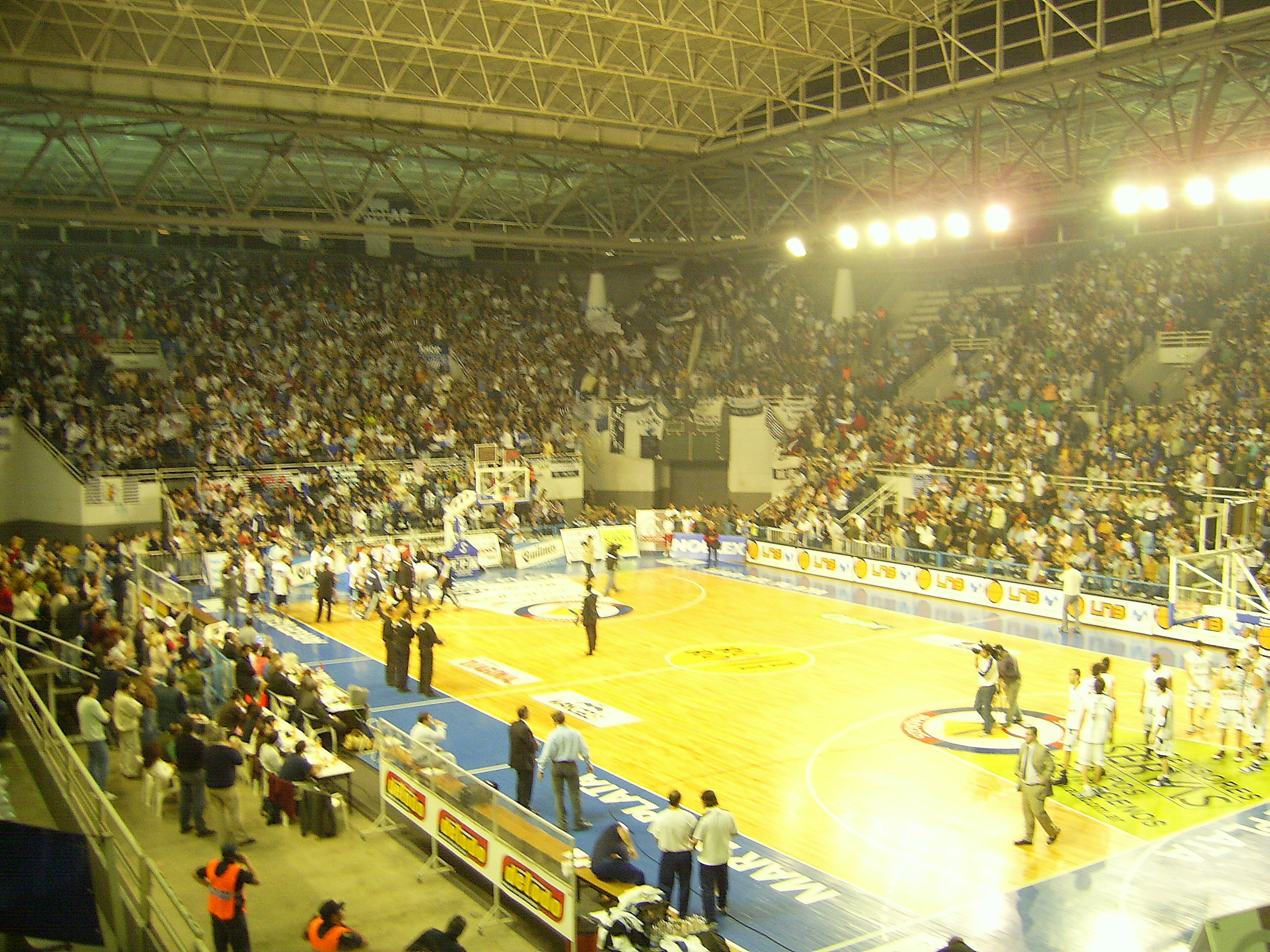
Polideportivo Islas Malvinas.

Mar del Plata's most popular football (soccer) teams are Aldosivi, Alvarado and Kimberley. Aldosivi plays in Primera Nacional, Alvarado and Kimberley in the Torneo Argentino B.

Peñarol and Quilmes de Mar del Plata are the most popular basketball teams. Peñarol have won eight official tournaments (Súper 8, FIBA Americas League, five National Leagues, InterLigas, and Copa Argentina). Mar del Plata hosted the 2011 FIBA Americas Championship, where the city's basketball fans supported Argentina's national basketball team to win the gold medal. All games were played in the 8,000 seat Polideportivo Islas Malvinas.

For many years, the city hosted a strong international chess tournament.

Mar del Plata hosted six matches in the 1978 FIFA World Cup at the Estadio José María Minella, which was built for the sporting event. It also hosted 6 games in the 2002 FIVB Volleyball Men's World Championship at the Polideportivo Islas Malvinas.

The city also hosted the 1995 Pan American Games, the 2001 Rugby World Cup Sevens, the 1969 World Wrestling Championships, the 1998 Padel World Championship, the 1996 Artistic Skating World Championships and 6 editions of the Inline Speed Skating World Championships (1966, 1969, 1975, 1978, 1983, 1997).

The city is home to Argentine Bandy Union.

In 2003 Mar del Plata hosted the 2nd Parapan American Games that featured 1,500 athletes from 28 countries competed in nine sporting events. This was the last Parapan American Games that was not tied to the Pan American Games.

The 20th World Transplant Games were held in the city from 23 to 30 August 2015.

Mar del Plata was the starting point for the 2012 Dakar Rally.

The Argentina Polo School has its head office at Parque Camet, a green area north of the city.

== Twin towns – Sister cities ==
Mar del Plata is twinned with:

Acireale, Italy; Viña del Mar, Chile; Tianjin, China; Havana, Cuba; A Coruña, Spain; Biarritz, France; Bari, Italy	Ischia, Campania, Italy; San Benedetto del Tronto, Italy; Agadir, Morocco; Vigan, Philippines; Saint Petersburg, Russia; (United States) Fort Lauderdale, USA; Fleury-sur-Orne, France

== Gallery ==
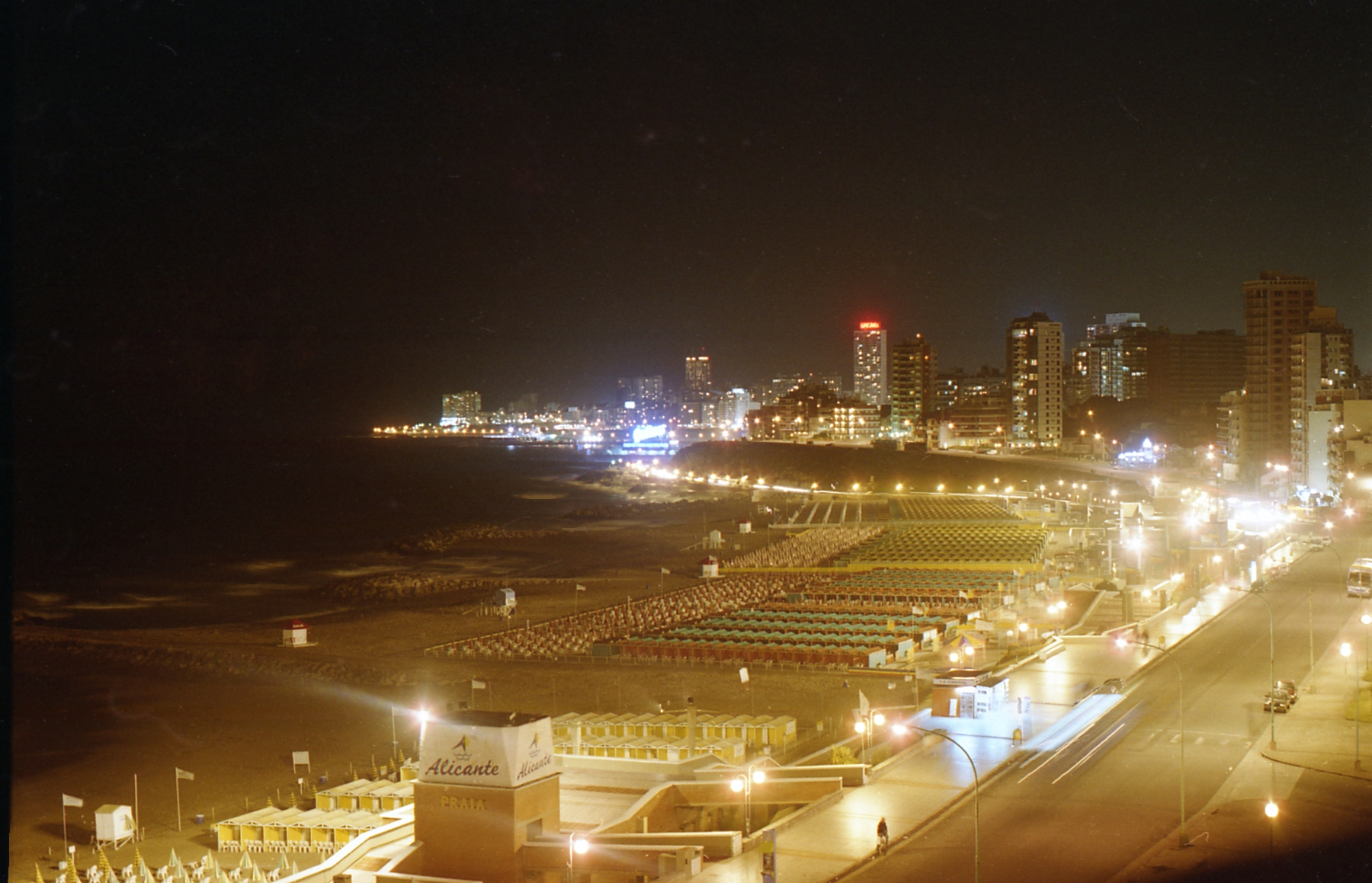
Mar del Plata's view at night from La Perla beaches

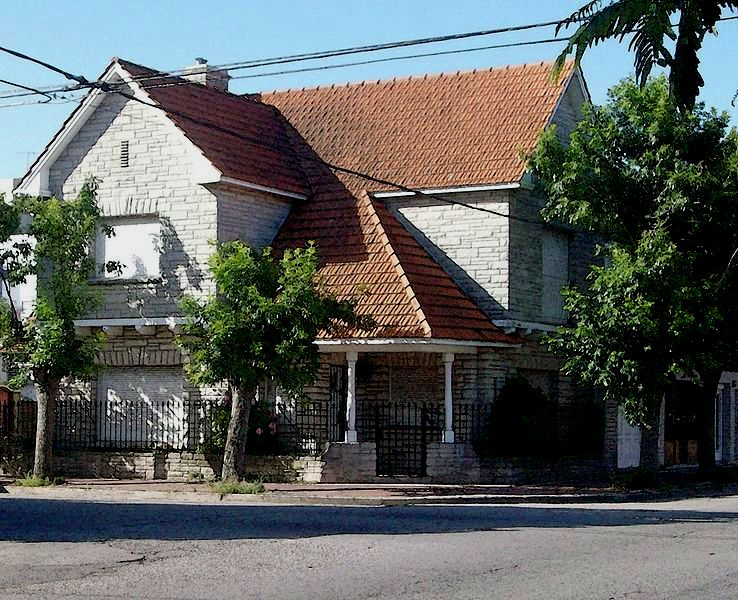
A two-story Mar del Plata style chalet

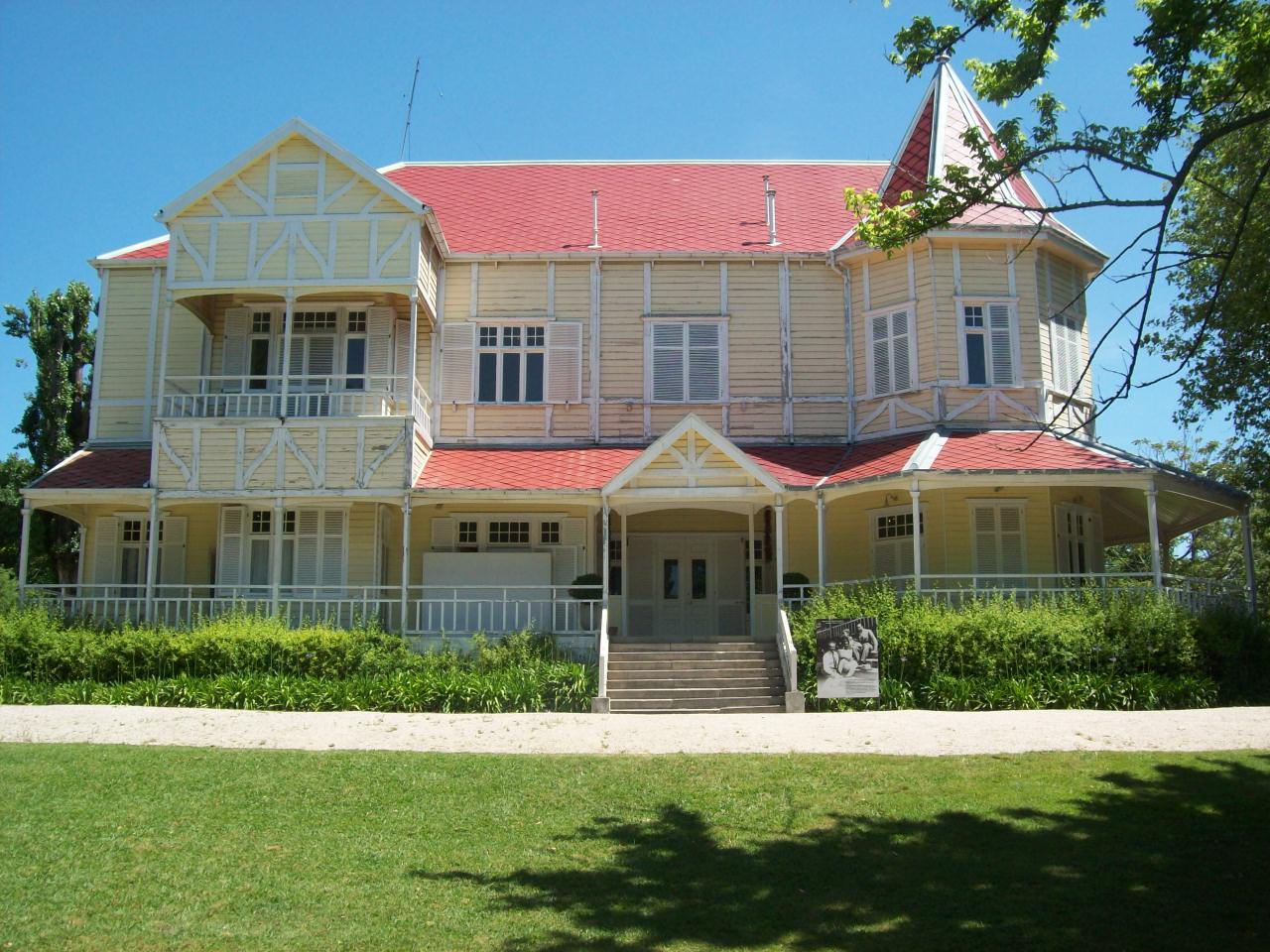
Villa Victoria, the former home of Victoria Ocampo

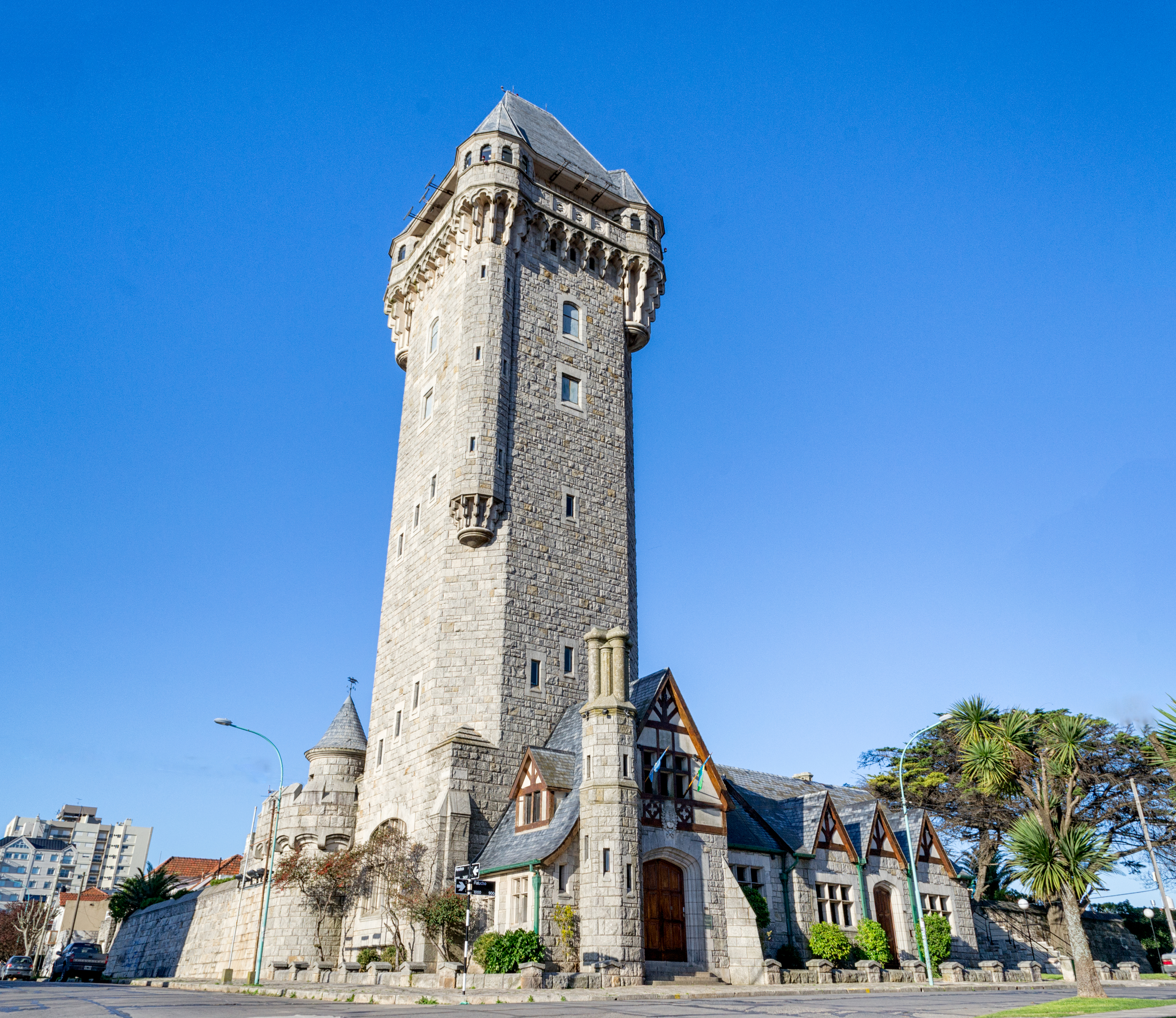
The Tudor Revival Style Water Tower (Torre Tanque)

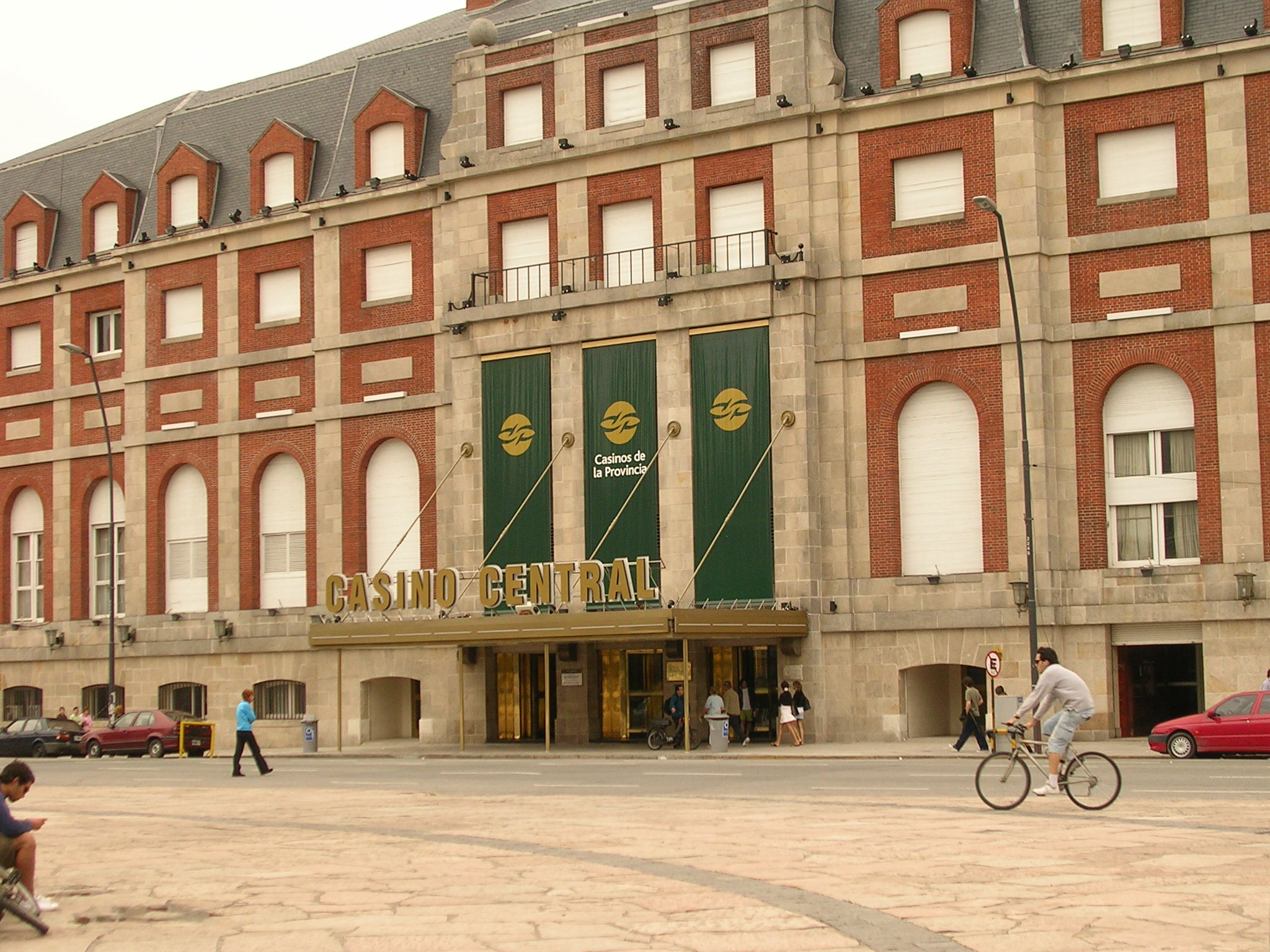
Mar del Plata Casino

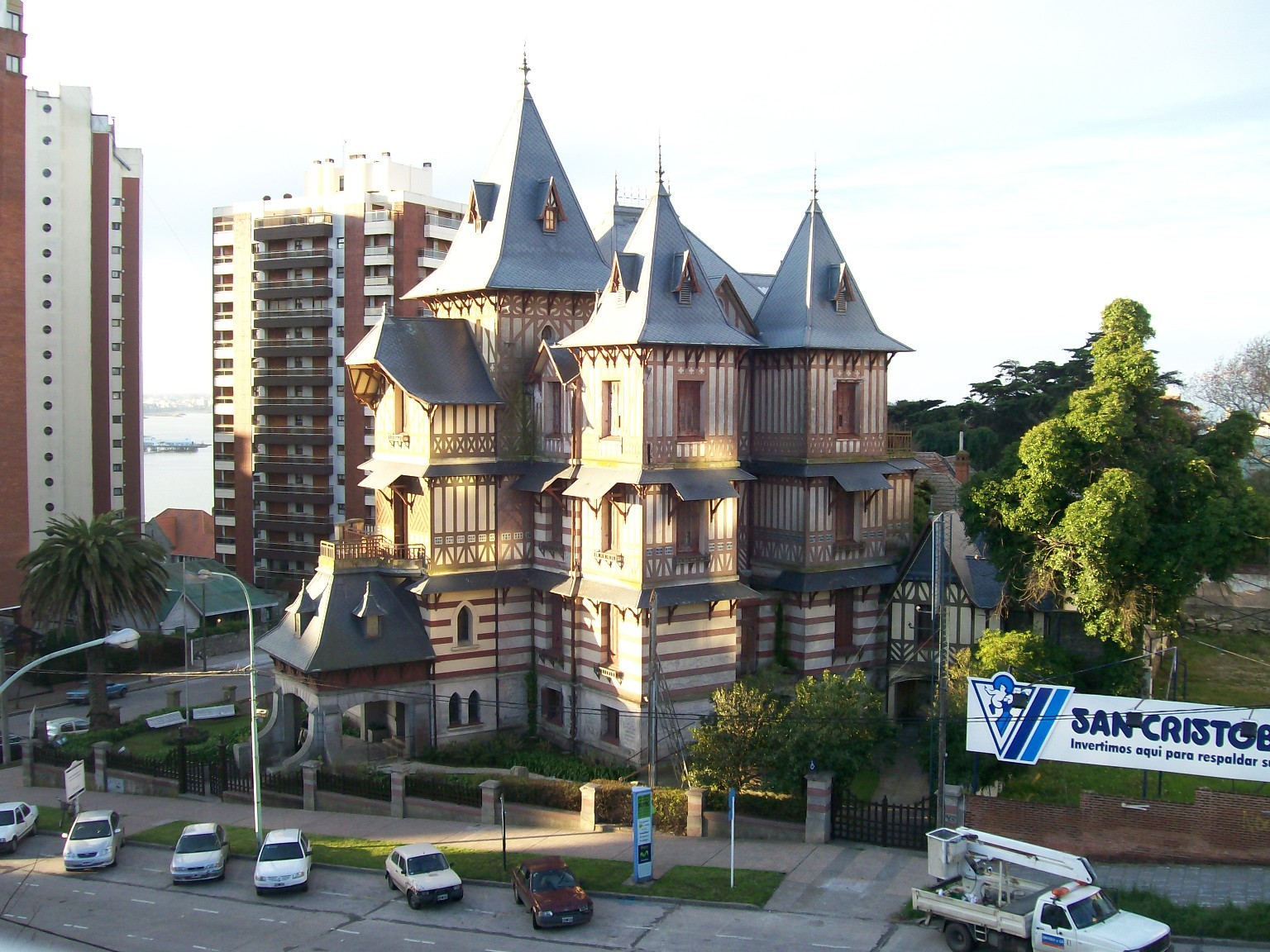
Municipal art Museum

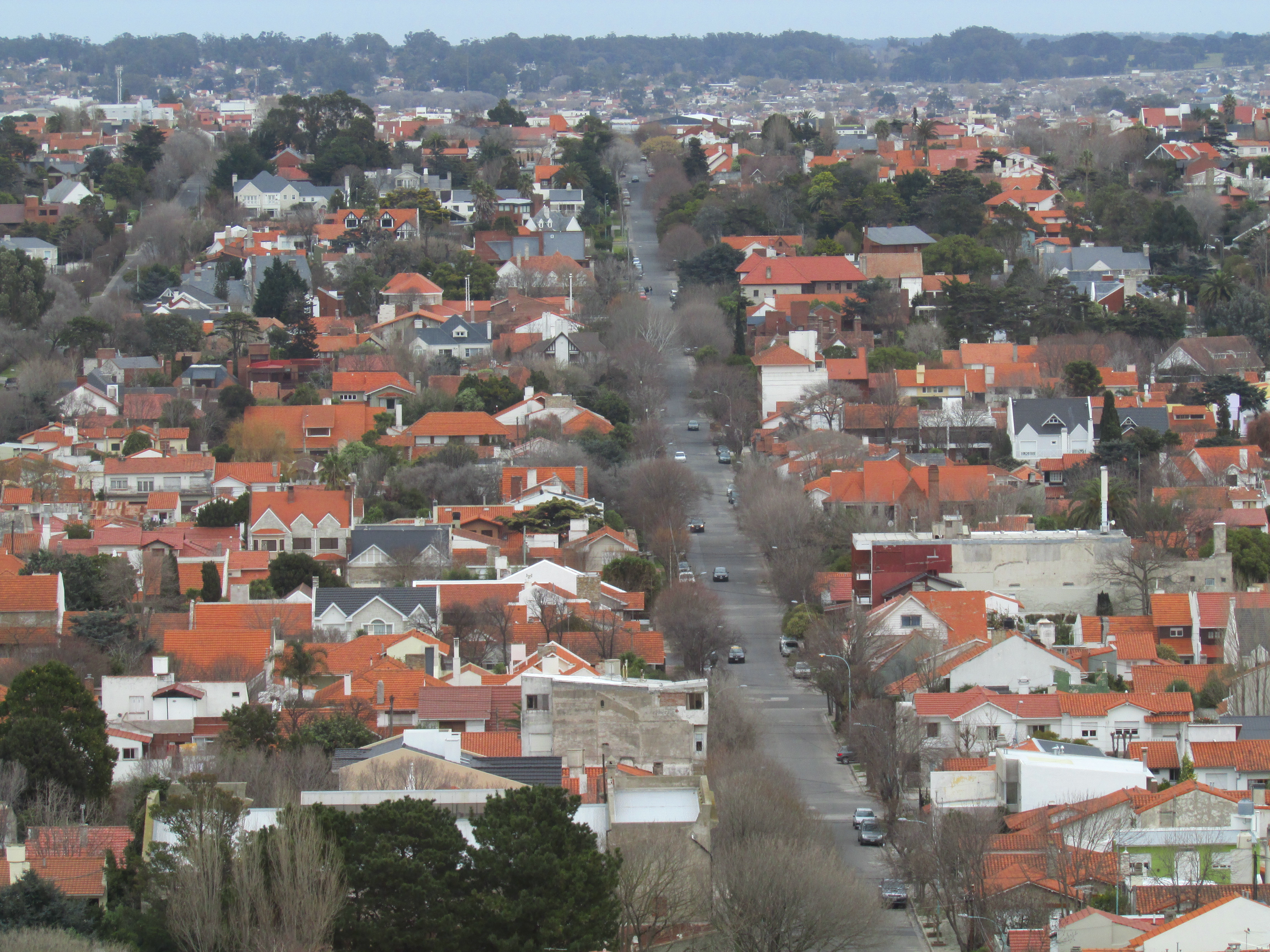
Stella Maris neighbourhood seen from the southwestern window of the Water Tower (Torre Tanque)

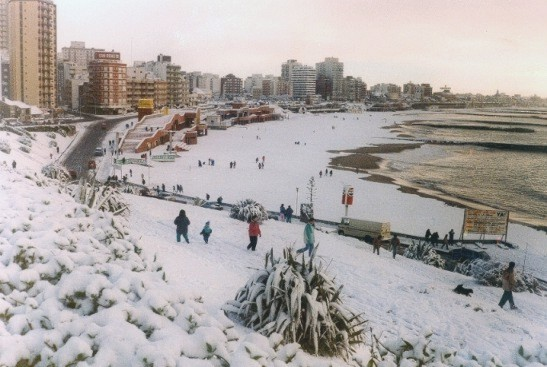
Snow on La Perla beach after the unusual snowstorm of August 1, 1991
