= Mariano Mignini =

Argentine footballer

Personal information
- Full name: Mariano Nicolás Mignini
- Date of birth: 11 October 1975 (age 51)
- Place of birth: Mar del Plata, Argentina
- Height: 1.85 m (6 ft 1 in)
- Position: Midfielder

Youth career
- Kimberley

Senior career*
Years	Team	Apps	(Gls)
1994–1997	Aldosivi	23	(0)
1997–2000	Chacarita Juniors	62	(7)
2000	Audax Italiano	19	(1)
2001–2004	Chacarita Juniors	111	(10)
2004–2005	Argentinos Juniors	29	(2)
2005–2006	Chacarita Juniors	33	(1)
2006–2008	Aldosivi	40	(2)
2008–2009	Civitanovese		

Managerial career
- 2015–2016: Kimberley
- * Club domestic league appearances and goals

Mariano Nicolás Mignini (born 11 October 1975 in Mar del Plata) is an Argentine former football midfielder.

== Career ==
Born in Mar del Plata, Mignini, known as el Gatito, began playing youth football with local side Kimberley de Mar del Plata. In 1994, he joined rivals Club Atlético Aldosivi, where he would make his senior football debut and help the club reach the Primera B Nacional.

Mignini played in the Argentine Primera División with Chacarita Juniors and Argentinos Juniors. In 2000, he also had a stint with Chilean club Audax Italiano.

After Mignini retired from playing football, he became a coach. Along with his cousin, Mignini managed Kimberley to its first Liga Marplatense de Fútbol title in 2016.
