= Magnini =

Magnini is an Italian surname. Notable people with the surname include:

- Ardico Magnini (1928–2020), Italian football player
- Filippo Magnini (born 1982), Italian swimmer
