= Mar del Plata Museum of the Sea =

Coordinates: 38°00′40″S 57°32′09″W

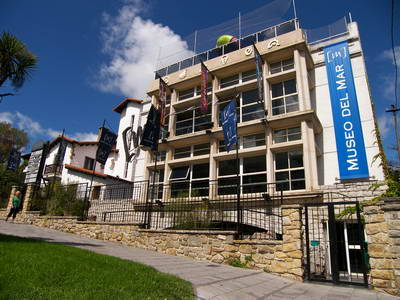
- The Museum of the Sea, Mar del Plata
- Interactive map of Mar del Plata Museum of the Sea
- Date opening: September 22, 2000
- Date closed: September 2012
- Location: Mar del Plata, Argentina

The Museum of the Sea was a museum of marine biology and aquarium in the seaside city of Mar del Plata, Argentina. The museum closed its doors in September 2012, after 12 years in operation.

== Overview ==
A gift box containing 15 seashells, and delivered to 17-year-old Benjamín Sisterna from his brother in 1932, created a lifelong fascination with sea shells and oceanography in the young man. A co-founder of the food company Havanna, Sisterna made 26 trips around the world in sixty years resulted in a personal collection of over 30,000 shells, fossils and marine invertebrates, among other items.

Sisterna's death in 1995 left the collection to his heirs, who began work on the Museo del Mar, Museum of the Sea, in Mar del Plata. Born in Santa Fe, Argentina, a city far from the Atlantic Ocean, Sisterna had lived in seaside Mar del Plata for the last 40 years of his life.

Inaugurated on September 22, 2000, the museum was divided into four levels:

- The ground floor included the lobby, which featured a map of the world tracing Sisterna's exploratory travels. The gift shop, Benjamin Sisterna Auditorium and the Gloria Maris Café (named after the hill on which the museum was built) lead from the lobby, and were surrounded by aquaria and glass cabinets.
- A lower level housed geological displays, and was laid out in a hall reproducing a submerged cave. The cave featured a central pond inhabited by smaller marine organisms, and is connected with the ground-floor aquaria.
- The second floor was divided into two areas, including one exhibiting contemporary art and cultural objects, and the nacre and seashell collection hall, where exhibits were displayed and labeled in glass cabinets.
- The third floor featured a photographic gallery of Sisterna's travels and of oceanography generally, as well as a vantage point towards the lower the floors designed to visually integrate the aforementioned displays. The hall lead to a children's activities section, a meteorological station and an observation deck, which provided an expansive view of the city and ocean beyond.

The museum closed its doors in 2012 due to the lack of official funds to continue its activities. The multinational technological company Globant acquired the building in 2014. One of its founders is Guibert Englebienne Jr, an entrepreneur born in Mar del Plata and whose family has deep roots in the city.

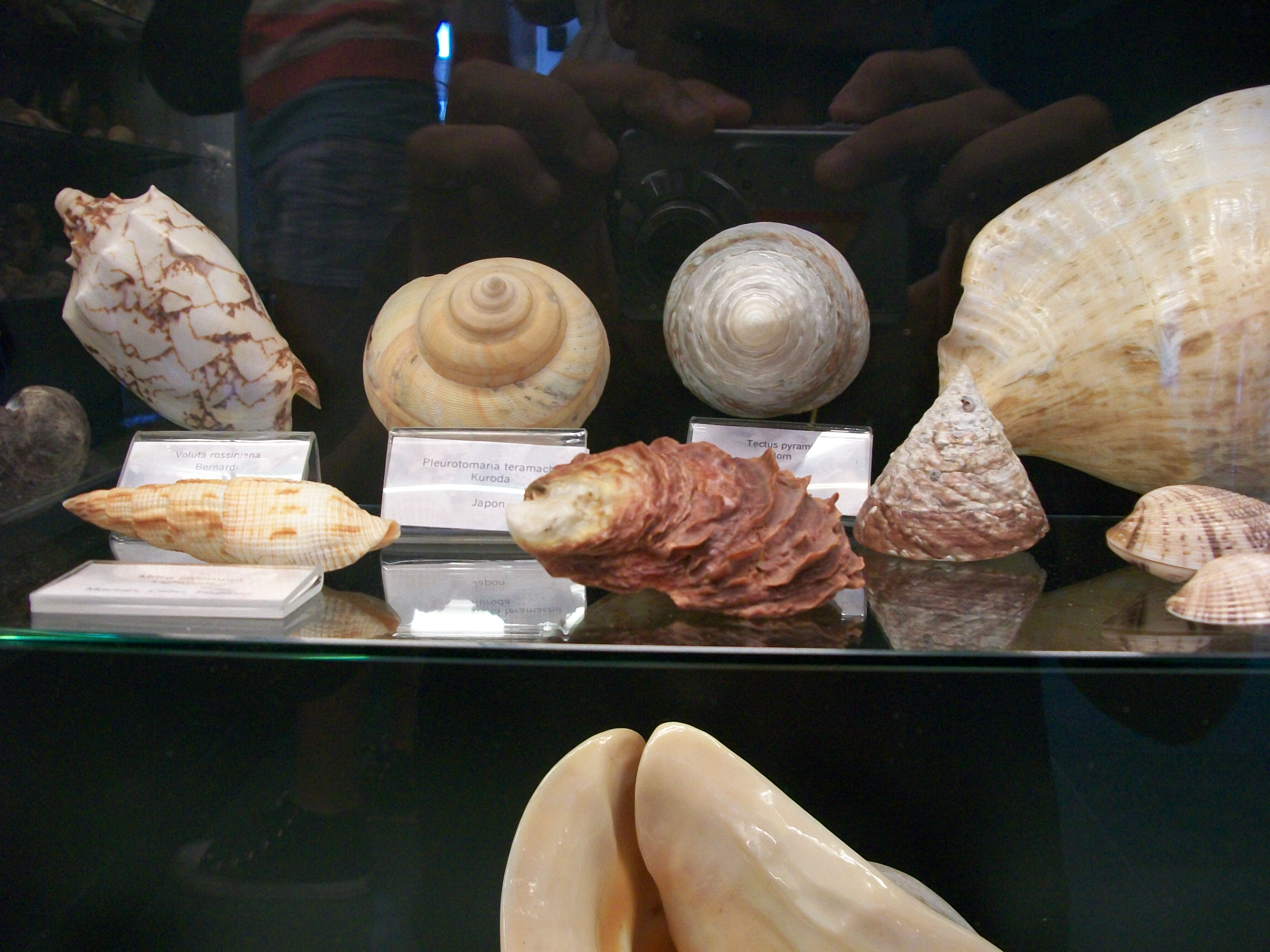
Sea shells

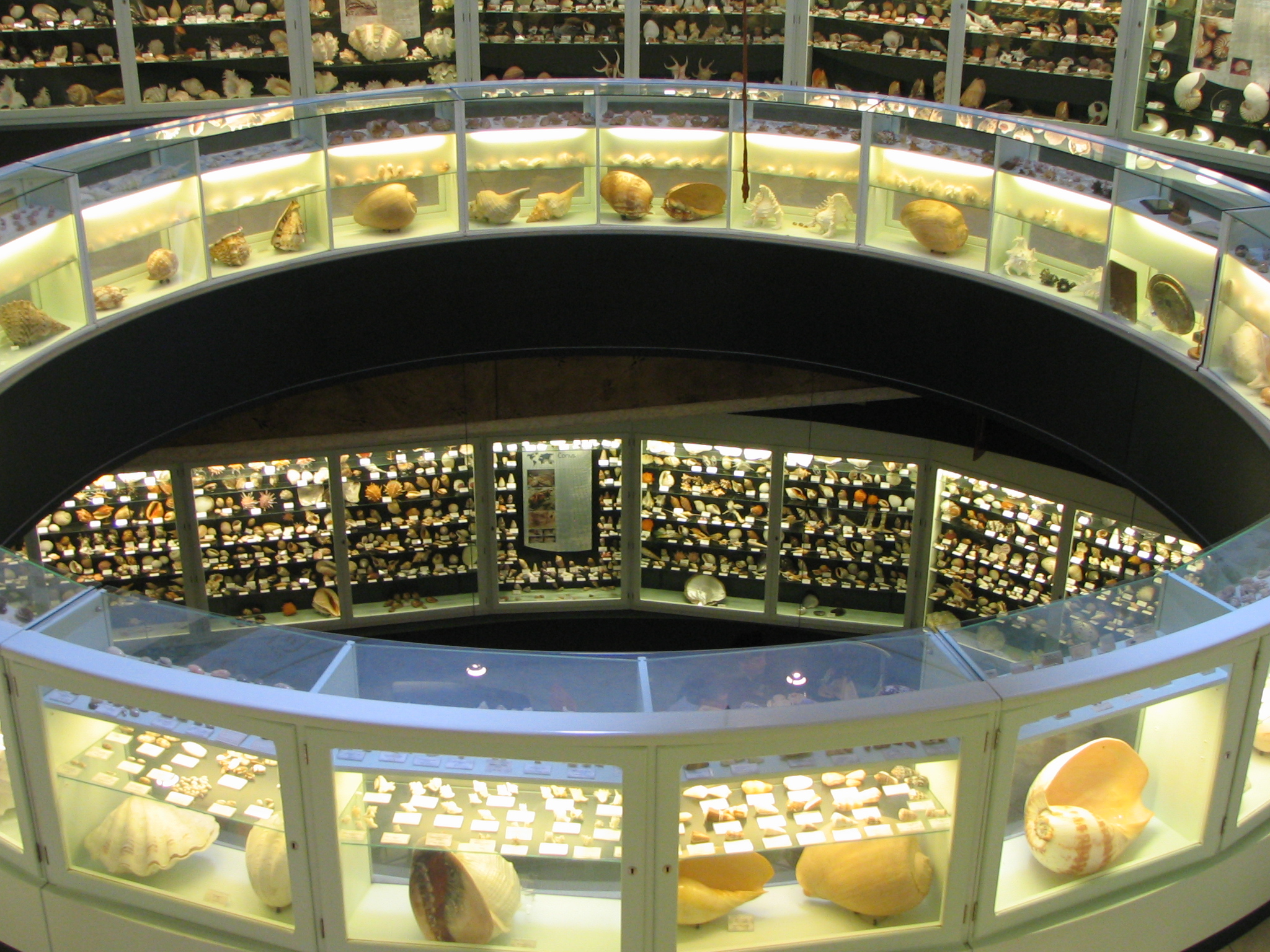
Collection of over 30,000 sea shells, among other specimens.

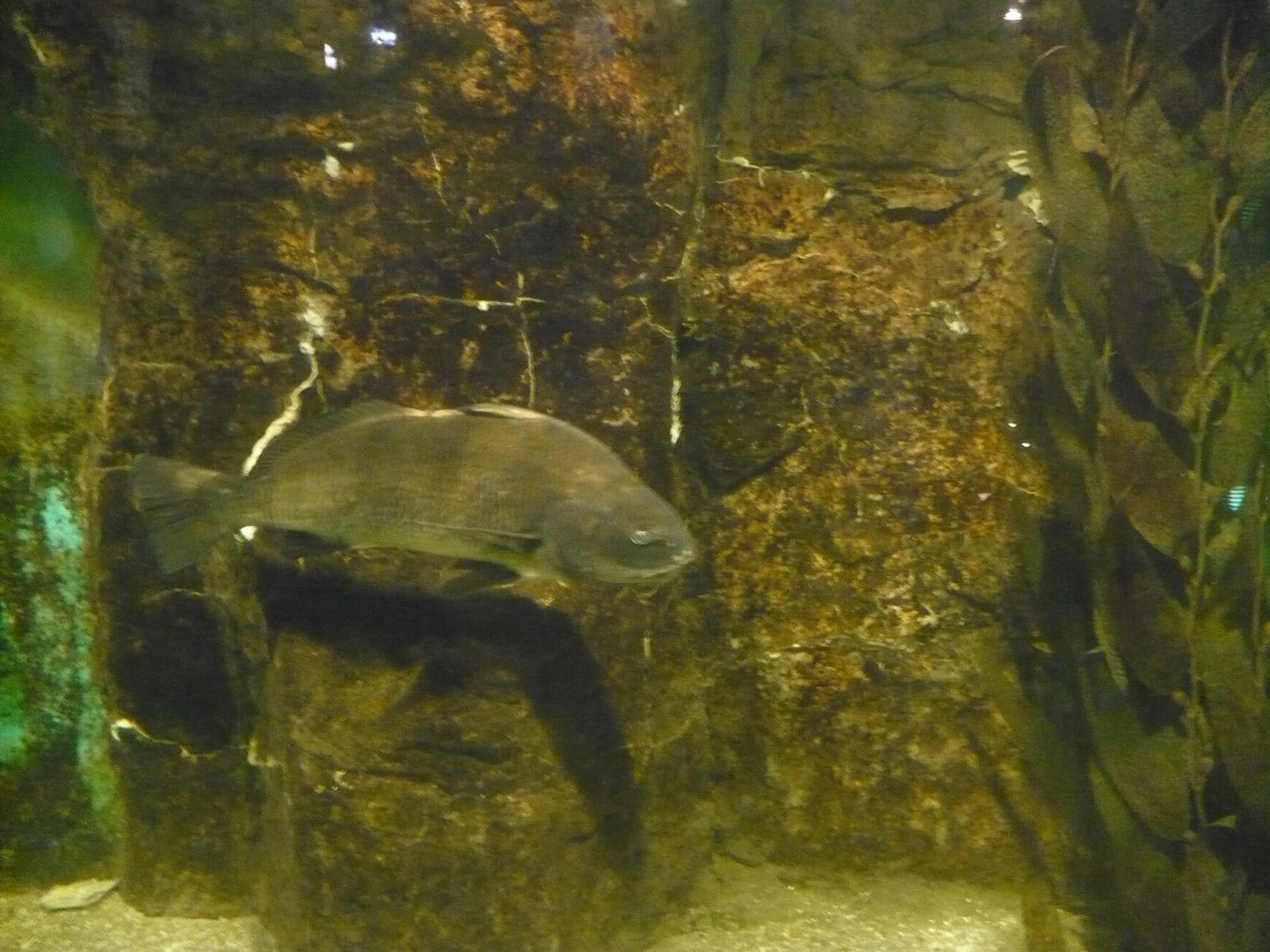
Sea cave display

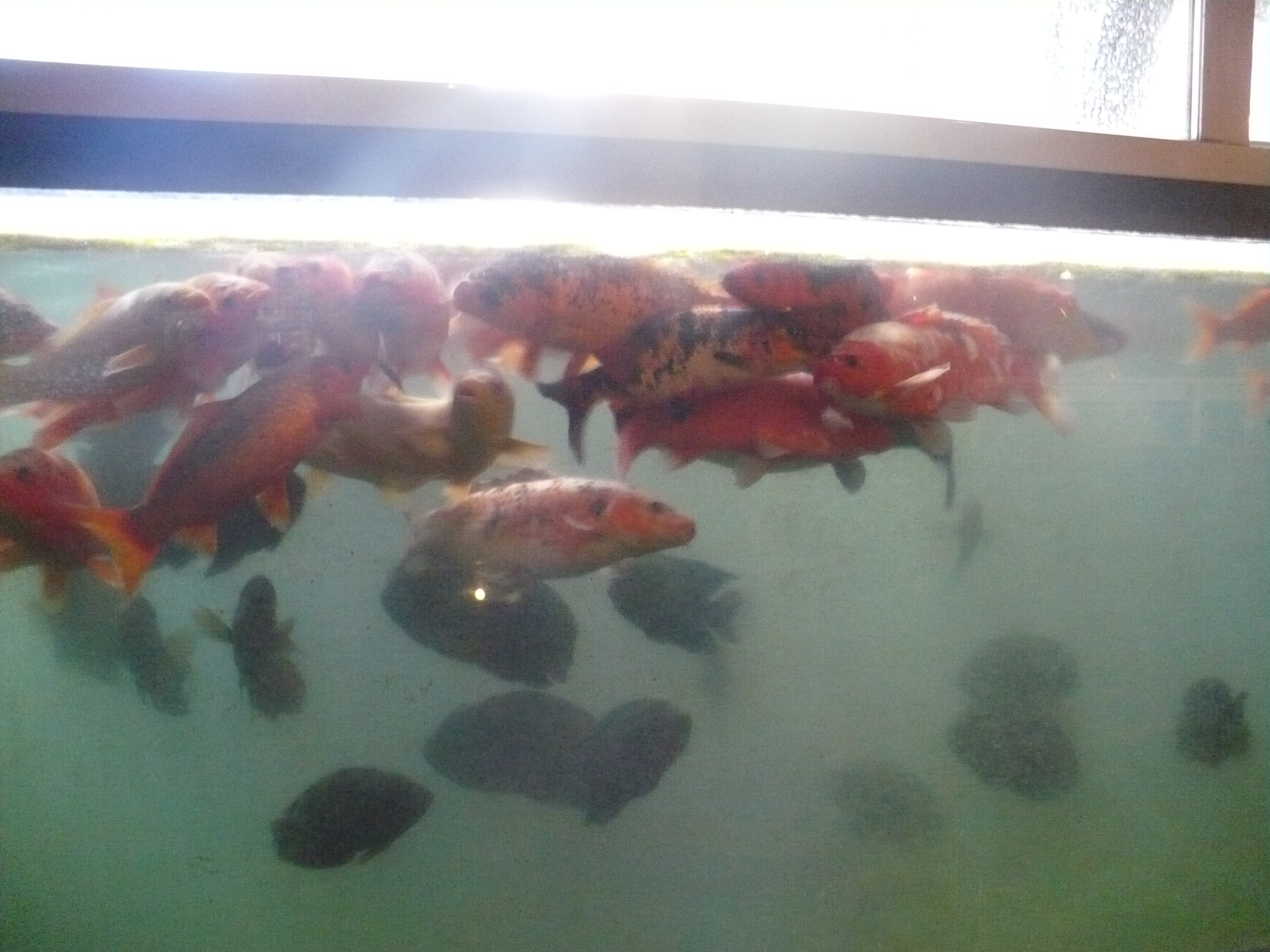
Aquarium
