= Deaths in October 1989 =

The following is a list of notable deaths in October 1989.

Entries for each day are listed alphabetically by surname. A typical entry lists information in the following sequence:

- Name, age, country of citizenship at birth, subsequent country of citizenship (if applicable), reason for notability, cause of death (if known), and reference.

== October 1989 ==
=== 1 ===
- Eric Ball, 85, British composer and brass band conductor.
- Manuel Clouthier, 55, Mexican politician, traffic collision.
- Carlo Dapporto, 78, Italian film actor.
- Ian Keith, 81, Scottish peer and nobleman.
- David Lindesay-Bethune, 63, British soldier and hereditary peer.
- Witold Rowicki, 75, Polish conductor (Warsaw Philharmonic Orchestra).
- Frank Sachse, 72, American football and basketball player.

=== 2 ===
- Paola Barbara, 77, Italian film actress (White Amazons).
- Aubrey Boomer, 91, American golfer, stroke.
- Vittorio Caprioli, 68, Italian actor and director, heart attack.
- Cousin Joe, 81, American blues and jazz singer.
- Gregory Marshall, 50, American actor.
- Jesús Emilio Jaramillo Monsalve, 73, Colombian Roman Catholic prelate, Bishop of Arauca, shot.

=== 3 ===
- James Bickford, 76, American Olympic bobsledder (1936, 1948, 1952, 1956).
- John Eugene Cay Jr., 74, American author (Ward Allen: Savannah River Market Hunter), brain tumour.
- David H. Geiger, 53–54, American engineer, heart attack.
- Mehmut Şevket Karman, 77, Turkish Olympic skier (1936).
- Bahadur Khan, 58, Indian sarod player and film score composer.
- Andrée Lafayette, 86, French actress (Trilby).
- Dennis McGee, 96, American Cajun musician.
- Yvonne Sylvain, 82, Haitian physician.
- Ray Thomas, 63, Australian rules footballer.
- Del Wood, 69, American pianist, stroke.
- Norman Yardley, 74, English test cricketer, captain of England, stroke.

=== 4 ===
- Michael Barton Akehurst, 48–49, British lawyer and author.
- Thomas Canning, 77, American composer and music educator.
- Graham Chapman, 48, British actor, comedian and writer (Monty Python), tonsil cancer.
- Laura Combes, 35, American bodybuilder, alcohol poisoning.
- Frederic de Hoffmann, 65, Austrian-born American nuclear physicist (Manhattan Project), AIDS from blood transfusion.
- Moisés Giroldi, 39, Panamanian military commander (1989 Panamanian coup attempt), executed.
- Ramchandra Purushottam Marathe, 64, Indian music director, singer and actor.
- Edmund Osmańczyk, 76, Polish writer.
- Betsy King Ross, 68, American actress, anthropologist and author.
- Lutero Vargas, 77, Brazilian physician, diplomat and politician, ambassador to Nicaragua.

=== 5 ===
- Robert T. Ashmore, 85, American politician, member of the U.S. House of Representatives (1953-1969), heart ailments and pneumonia.
- Lawrence Dundas, 80, British hereditary peer.
- Ernesto Formenti, 62, Italian Olympic boxer (1948).
- John Layton, 77, American Olympic sports shooter (1948).
- Noël-Noël, 92, French actor and screenwriter.
- Big Wilson, 65, American radio personality, heart attack.

=== 6 ===
- Patricia Cockburn, 75, Irish writer and artist, cancer.
- Bette Davis, 81, American actress (Dangerous, Jezebel), cancer.
- Jacques Doniol-Valcroze, 69, French actor and director, ruptured aneurysm.
- Gaston Fayaud, 75, French Olympic boxer (1932, 1936).
- Howard Garns, 84, American architect, creator of Sudoku, cancer.
- Paul Henry, 77, Belgian footballer.
- Tina Isa, 16, American murder victim.
- Robert Poulet, 96, Belgian writer and journalist, sentenced to death for collaborating with Nazis.
- Reinhard Seiler, 80, Nazi German Luftwaffe officer and flying ace.
- Jack Turner, 100, Canadian war photographer.

=== 7 ===
- Kurt Carlsen, 75, Danish-born American sea-captain (SS Flying Enterprise).
- Keith Elliott, 73, New Zealand soldier, Victoria Cross recipient, cancer.
- Josep Espada, 77, Spanish footballer.
- Forrest McPherson, 77, American NFL player (Chicago Bears, Philadelphia Eagles, Green Bay Packers).
- Aleksanteri Saarvala, 76, Finnish Olympic gymnast (1936, 1948).
- Earl Thomas, 74, American basketball player.

=== 8 ===
- Genki Abe, 95, Japanese lawyer, police bureaucrat and cabinet minister.
- Onest Conley, 82, American film actor (Racing Luck).
- Anne Dawson, 92, British secret agent in World War I.
- Gerry Denoird, 87, Canadian NHL player (Toronto St. Pats).
- Alwyn Harris, Royal Ulster Constabulary superintendent killed by the Provisional I.R.A.
- Oscar Moglia, 54, Uruguayan basketballer and Olympic medalist (Club Atlético Welcome, Uruguay).
- Dagmar Oakland, 92, American actress.
- Edward Woods, 86, American actor (The Public Enemy).

=== 9 ===
- Ernst Andersson, 80, Swedish footballer.
- Yusuf Atılgan, 68, Turkish novelist and dramatist, heart attack.
- Elizabeth Cadell, 85, British and Portuguese writer.
- Fernand Ciatti, 77, Luxembourgian Olympic boxer (1936).
- Herman Clark, 58, American NFL player (Chicago Bears).
- Sven Israelsson, 69, Swedish Olympic Nordic combined skier (1948).
- Penny Lernoux, 49, American author and journalist, lung cancer.
- Silvio Parodi, 57, Paraguayan football player and manager.
- Hassan Poladi, 44, Indian-born American writer (The Hazaras), liver failure.

=== 10 ===
- Robin Hughes, 69, Argentinian-born British film and television actor, liver disease.
- Murray McFarlane, 81, Canadian politician, member of the House of Commons of Canada (1958-1962).

=== 11 ===
- Percival Goodman, 85, American urban theorist and architect, designer of Synagogues, lung cancer.
- László Hidvéghy, 78, Hungarian Olympic speed skater (1936).
- M. King Hubbert, 86, American geologist and geophysicist (Hubbert peak theory), pulmonary embolism.
- Theodore Lorber, 82, American Olympic fencer (1932).
- Bill Phebus, 80, American MLB player (Washington Senators).
- Arnold Picker, 76, American film executive and mayor of Golden Beach, Florida, on Nixon's Enemies List, pneumonia.
- Paul Shenar, 53, American actor and theatre director (The Secret of NIMH, Scarface), AIDS.
- Zeng Xianzhi, 79, Chinese revolutionary and politician.

=== 12 ===
- Rolando Bacigalupo, 75, Peruvian Olympic basketball player (1936).
- Herb Boschen, 81, Australian rules footballer.
- Carmen Cavallaro, 76, American pianist, prostate cancer.
- Joe Foy, 46, American Major League baseball player (Boston Red Sox), heart attack.
- Franco Luambo, 51, Congolese musician, AIDS.
- Tommy Muldoon, 92, Irish footballer and Olympian (1924).
- Sim Var, 83, Cambodian politician, Prime Minister of Cambodia.
- Jay Ward, 69, American creator of animated TV cartoons (The Adventures of Rocky and Bullwinkle and Friends), renal cancer.
- N. V. Krishna Warrier, 73, Indian poet and journalist.

=== 13 ===
- Fred Agabashian, 76, American racer of midget cars and Indy cars.
- Tony Castaño, 77, Mexican baseball player.
- Lud Gluskin, 90, American jazz drummer and bandleader.
- Ed Kelaart, 88, Ceylonese cricketer.
- Munawar Ali Khan, 59, Indian classical vocalist.
- Merab Kostava, 50, Georgian dissident, musician and poet, car crash.
- Patrick McAuliffe, 75, Irish politician, member of the Dáil Éireann (1944-1969).
- Giuseppe Palmieri, 87, Italian Olympic athlete (1924).
- Herbert Wildman, 77, American Olympic water polo player (1932, 1936).
- Cesare Zavattini, 87, Italian screenwriter.

=== 14 ===
- Martin Broszat, 63, German historian.
- Michael Carmine, 30, American actor, AIDS.
- Lucy Doraine, 91, Hungarian-born silent-screen actress.
- Art Keay, 82, Canadian Olympic long-distance runner (1928).
- Scott Liebler, 29, American racing driver, racing accident.
- René Petit, 90, French engineer and international footballer (Real Unión, France).
- Dov Sadan, 87, Israeli literacy critic and politician, member of the Knesset (1965-1968).
- Amancio Williams, 76, Argentinian architect.

=== 15 ===
- James Lee Barrett, 59, American author, producer and screenwriter, cancer.
- Paul Georgescu, 65, Romanian journalist, fiction writer and communist political figure.
- Lou Guisto, 94, American MLB player (Cleveland Indians).
- Danilo Kiš, 54, Serbian novelist and short story writer (Hourglass), lung cancer.
- Scott O'Dell, 91, American children's writer (Island of the Blue Dolphins), prostate cancer.
- Michał Rola-Żymierski, 99, Polish Communist Party leader, Marshal of Poland.
- Heinrich Walter, 90, German-Russian botanist.

=== 16 ===
- Mirko Bonačić, 86, Yugoslavian Olympic footballer (1928).
- Walter Farley, 74, American author (The Black Stallion), cancer.
- Juan B. Fernandez-Badillo, 77, Puerto Rican district judge (United States District Court for the District of Puerto Rico).
- Hans Frette, 62, Norwegian politician.
- Alfred Krupa, 74, Polish-born Yugoslavian painter.
- Frederick Millar, 89, British diplomat, ambassador to West Germany.
- Cornel Wilde, 77, Hungarian-born American actor (A Song to Remember), leukemia.

=== 17 ===
- John J. Anderson, 32, American writer on computing and technology (Computer Shopper, MacUser), California earthquake.
- George Gardiner, 74, Australian cricketer.
- Morteza Hannaneh, 66, Iranian composer and musician.
- Helge Jansson, 85, Swedish Olympic athlete (1924, 1928).
- Mark Krein, 82, Soviet mathematician (operator theory).
- John Mackinson, 65, American MLB player (Philadelphia Athletics, St. Louis Cardinals).
- J. B. Malone, 75, Irish hill-walking enthusiast.
- Cyril Mathew, 77, Sri Lankan politician, Member of Parliament, heart attack.
- R. A. B. Mynors, 86, English classicist and medievalist, road accident.
- Derek Pace, 57, English footballer (Sheffield United).

=== 18 ===
- Mirko Bonačić, 86, Croatian footballer and Olympian (1928).
- Lešek Boubela, 79, Czech Olympic water polo player (1936).
- Stan Miasek, 65, American NBA basketballer (Chicago Stags).
- John Reddish, 84, English footballer and cricketer.
- David Victor, 79, American producer and screenwriter.

=== 19 ===
- Eric Dixon, 59, American tenor saxophonist, flautist and composer.
- Albert Geldard, 75, English international footballer (Everton, England).
- Jerzy Jurowicz, 69, Polish footballer.
- Alan Murphy, 35, English rock session guitarist, pneumonia.
- Salim Nasir, 44, Pakistani film and TV actor (Aangan Terha), heart attack.
- Essie Shevill, 81, Australian cricketer.
- Alfred Zulkowski, 49, German footballer.

=== 20 ===
- Dan Ben-Amotz, 65, Polish-born Israeli radio broadcaster, journalist and author, liver cancer.
- Rupert Costo, 82–83, Native American writer, activist and publisher.
- Dmitry Faddeev, 82, Soviet mathematician.
- Katharina Heinroth, 92, German zoologist, director of Berlin Zoo.
- Jim Karthaus, 91, Australian rules footballer.
- Gurdial Singh Phul, 77–78, Indian Punjabi dramatist.
- Sir Anthony Quayle, 76, British actor (Lawrence of Arabia, Anne of the Thousand Days), liver cancer.
- James Smurthwaite, 73, English cricketer.

=== 21 ===
- Alfred Hayes, 79, American banker, president of the Federal Reserve Bank of New York.
- Jean Image, 78, Hungarian-French director and producer of animation films.
- Cencio Mantovani, 48, Italian Olympic cyclist (1964).
- Alphonse Margailland, 80, French Olympic rower (1928).

=== 22 ===
- Ross Freeman, 41, American electrical engineer and inventor, co-founder of Xilinx.
- Ewan MacColl, 74, British folk singer and songwriter (The First Time Ever I Saw Your Face), complications from heart surgery.
- Tony Manero, 84, American golfer, winner of 1936 U.S. Open.
- Charles Gelbert Neese, 73, American district judge (United States District Court for the Eastern District of Tennessee).
- Duke Nelson, 82, American college athletics coach and administrator.
- Bjarne Daniel Solli, 78, Norwegian politician.
- Jacob Wetterling, 11, American murder victim.
- Roland Winters, 84, American actor (Charlie Chan), stroke.

=== 23 ===
- Cecil Alloo, 94, New Zealand cricketer, soldier, and lawyer.
- Edmund E. Anderson, 83, American automotive designer (American Motors Corporation, General Motors).
- Armida, 78, Mexican-born American actress, singer and dancer, heart attack.
- Bert Hyde, 82, Australian rules footballer.
- Basavaraj Kattimani, 70, Indian novelist and journalist.
- Clive Lewington, 69, Australian rules footballer.
- Anatoly Lutikov, 56, Russian chess player.
- Konrad Wolff, 82, German pianist and musicologist, heart failure.

=== 24 ===
- Dean Alfange, 91, American politician, deputy New York State Attorney General, cancer.
- Gopal Gurunath Bewoor, 73, Indian army general, Chief of the Army Staff.
- Ralph Chase, 86, American NFL player (Hammond Pros, Akron Indians).
- Eugène Claudius-Petit, 82, French politician.
- Ronald Davis, 74, British Olympic field hockey player (1948).
- Joe Ewing Estes, 86, American district judge (United States District Court for the Northern District of Texas).
- Phyllis Greenacre, 95, American psychoanalyst and physician.
- Jerzy Kukuczka, 41, Polish mountaineer, fall from mountain.
- Vasilijus Matuševas, 43, Soviet Lithuanian Olympic volleyball player (1968).
- Otto Olsen, 94, Danish Olympic modern pentathlete (1924, 1928).
- Ollie O'Mara, 98, American MLB player (Brooklyn Robins).
- Alex Seidel, 80, German weapons manufacturer, co-founder of Heckler & Koch.
- Sahib Shihab, 64, American jazz saxophonist and flautist, liver cancer.

=== 25 ===
- Manuel Gregorio Acosta, 68, Mexican-born American painter, sculptor and illustrator, murdered.
- Georges Calmon, 79, French Olympic equestrian (1956).
- Frank Davies, 79, Australian rules footballer.
- Enrico Forcella, 82, Venezuelan Olympic sports shooter (1960, 1964, 1968).
- Mary McCarthy, 77, American novelist (The Group), lung cancer.
- Steve Moore, 29, American NFL footballer (New England Patriots), murdered.
- Cornel Orza, 73, Romanian footballer.
- Stuart Parkinson, 60, British Olympic alpine skier and bobsledder (1948, 1956).
- Carl Schmitt, 100, American painter and writer.
- Gerard Walschap, 91, Belgian writer.

=== 26 ===
- Burt Bales, 73, American jazz stride pianist.
- Don Bass, 33, American NFL footballer (Cincinnati Bengals), murdered.
- Ermal C. Fraze, 76, American engineer, inventor of the pull-tab opener, brain tumour.
- Mabel Hampton, 87, American gay activist and dancer, pneumonia.
- Nora Levin, 73, American Holocaust historian, cancer.
- Charles J. Pedersen, 85, Korean-born American organic chemist, Nobel laureate in Chemistry.
- Gordon Reid, 66, Australian academic, Governor of Western Australia, cancer.
- Andy Roberts, 42, New Zealand cricketer.
- Cynthia Slater, 44, American sex educator, AIDS.
- Kumeko Urabe, 87, Japanese movie actress, burns.

=== 27 ===
- Burton C. Gray, 48, American economist and entrepreneur, co-founded Scientific Time Sharing Corporation.
- Ted Grefe, 72, American NFL player (Detroit Lions).
- William Kerwin, 62, American actor and filmmaker, heart attack.
- Allan Campbell McLean, 66, British writer and political activist.
- Amy Mihaljevic, 10, American murder victim.
- Benjamin Murmelstein, 84, Austrian rabbi.
- Francesco Ruspoli, 90, Prince of the Holy Roman Empire.
- Willy Senn, 69, Swiss Olympic shot putter (1948).
- Sándor Szomori, 78, Hungarian Olympic handball player (1936).
- Alfred Wilson, 85, American Olympic rower (1924).

=== 28 ===
- Darel Dieringer, 63, American professional stock car racing driver.
- Henry Hall, 91, English bandleader.
- Louise Hay, 54, French-born American mathematician (recursively enumerable sets), breast cancer.
- Johannes Lislerud, 78, Norwegian politician.
- Dado Marino, 74, American flyweight boxer, world flyweight champion.
- Liam Redmond, 76, Irish stage, film and television actor.
- Al Satterfield, 67, American NFL player (San Francisco 49ers).
- Yuliya Solntseva, 88, Soviet actress and film director (Aelita).
- Peter Whiteley, 54, English cricketer.
- Kateb Yacine, 60, Algerian writer of novels and plays.

=== 29 ===
- Roland Anderson, 85, American movie art director.
- Jack Barker, 71, Australian rules footballer.
- Róża Maria Goździewska, 53, Polish child nurse during Warsaw uprising.
- Ndaba Mhlongo, 56, South African actor and choreographer.

=== 30 ===
- Joseph Beruh, 65, American film and theatrical producer.
- Herbert Bignall, 83, British Olympic long-distance runner (1928).
- Walter Bradshaw, 83, English cricketer.
- Willie Cornelius, 83, American Negro Leagues baseball player.
- Theodore Roosevelt Dalton, 88, American attorney and U.S. district judge, pneumonia.
- Karen Grigorian, 42, Armenian chess master, suicide.
- Ingeborg Refling Hagen, 93, Norwegian author, poet and artistic director.
- Douglas Legg, 75, British Olympic basketball player (1948).
- Aristid Lindenmayer, 63, Hungarian biologist (L-systems).
- Francis J. Love, 88, American politician, member of the United States House of Representatives (1947-1949).
- Patrick Mooney, 85, Irish politician, member of the Dáil Éireann (1954-1969).
- Raymond Offner, 61, French Olympic basketball player (1948).
- Erich Reuter, 85, Nazi German general in the Wehrmacht.
- Yisrael Spira, 99, Polish Holocaust survivor.
- Pedro Vargas, 83, Mexican tenor and actor, diabetes.

=== 31 ===
- Conrad Beck, 88, Swiss composer.
- Raymond Durand, 81, French footballer.
- Sune Lindström, 82, Swedish architect.
- Elliott Loughlin, 79, American U.S. Navy Rear Admiral.
- Georgi Partsalev, 64, Bulgarian theatre and film actor.
- George Rae, 78, English cricketer.
- Roger Scott, 46, British radio disc jockey, stomach cancer.
- Earl Seick, 78, American NFL player (New York Giants).
- Walter R. Tkach, 72, American Physician to the President, heart disease.

=== Unknown date ===
- Wilgar Campbell, 42–43, Irish blues rock musician, alcohol-related illness.
- Johannes Mashiane, South African rapist and serial killer, suicide.
- Gerry Monroe, 56, English pop singer.
