= George Gardiner =

George Gardiner may refer to:

- George Gardiner (priest) (1535–1589), English Dean of Norwich
- George Gardiner (settler) (c. 1610–c. 1677), early settler of Newport, Rhode Island
- George Gardiner (VC) (1821–1891), recipient of the Victoria Cross
- George Gardiner (politician) (1935–2002), British politician
- George Gardiner (boxer) (1877–1954), Irish-American boxer
- George Gardiner (cricketer) (1914–1989), Australian cricketer
- George R. Gardiner (1917–1997), financier and founder of Gardiner Museum
- George Gardiner (RAF officer) (1892–1940), World War I flying ace
- George Gardiner (wrestler) (1900–1924), British wrestler
- George Gardiner (folk-song collector) (1852–1910), collector of folk songs in Southern England
- George Gardiner (footballer) (1877–1933), Australian rules footballer
- George Gardiner (rugby league), New Zealand rugby league player

== See also ==
- George Gardner (disambiguation)
