= Casa del Puente =

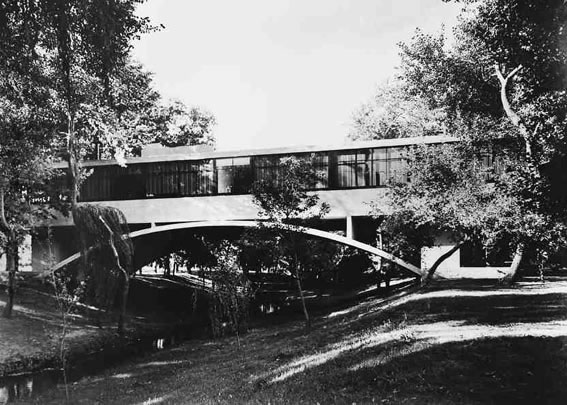
- Casa sobre el Arroyo in 1949
- Interactive map of Casa del Puente
- 38°00′31″S 57°34′25″W
- Location: Matheu 3990; Mar del Plata; Argentina

History
- Built: 1943–1946

Site notes
- Architect: Amancio Williams
- Architectural style: Modern architecture

The Casa del Puente (en: "Bridge House") is a house designed by the Argentine architect Amancio Williams in 1942 in the city of Mar del Plata, Argentina. The house is built over the course of a stream known as Las Chacras. It was intended to serve as the permanent residence of Williams's father, Argentine musician and composer Alberto Williams. The project was originally known as Casa sobre el Arroyo (en: "House on the Stream"). The house is listed among the most famous modernist buildings of the 20th century.

== Architecture ==
The house is located on a wooded parcel in the Pinos de Anchorena neighborhood, Mar del Plata, Argentina. A stream running through the terrain became the centerpiece for the original 1942 design for a modern, 9 by 27 meter (30 by 90 foot) weatherized concrete structure, which was set on an archway straddling the stream. Works began in 1943. The construction of the compound was commissioned to two local building companies, Sartora e hijos and Lemmi hnos. Williams' design looked for a fusion of modern building technology and topography, and for a non-intrusive relationship between architecture and nature. There was also an eclecticism between rationalist and traditional architectural features. The house is made of three basic segments; a curved layer for the archway, two flat layers for the house itself and another layer for the rooftop. The body of the house's weight is supported in the center by the curved layer and on the sides by bulkheads. There are two entrances to the house, each one at both ends of the bridge, which led to stairways that run parallel to the curved layer. The stairways can be seen from outside through picture windows. The main window runs 360º all around the house perimeter. Williams devised a light, aerial and see-through structure. The headroom of the house was conceived as a sound-proofing music room with a grand-piano, where Williams senior could compose music. The project included a detached garage and service room. The wooded landscape departed the picturesque concept of Mar del Plata's traditional architecture, in which nature is presented in a bucolic setting for a comprehensive merging of nature and architecture.

== Interiors and furnishing ==
Williams and his wife, Delfina Gálvez Bunge, also designed the home's minimalist interiors, fashioning the interior doors, fixtures and boiserie in a workshop in situ, as well as most of the furniture. All internal divisions and screens are made of wooden panels, while the floor is paved with polish carob blocks. Williams used his expertise in engineering by outfitting the windows with motorized awnings. The lighting of the house was provided by copper lamps furnished with opaline glass lampshades. The concrete used in its construction was also chemically weatherized at the facility, so done to allow its use in the design without the need for cladding or paint, which Williams felt would take from what he described as the "honesty of the materials".

== History ==
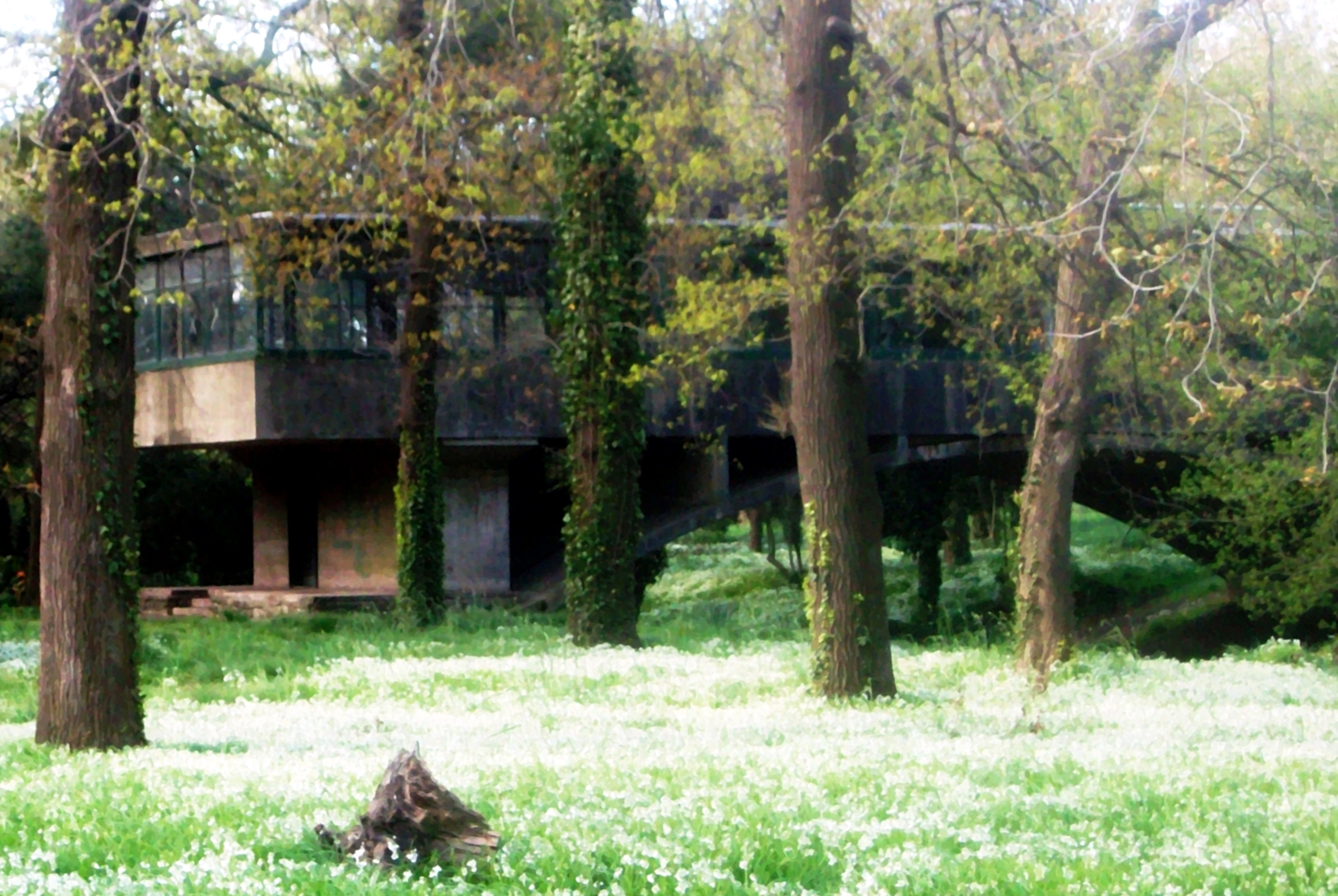
Casa del Puente in September 2012

The elder Williams had purchased a 2 hectares (4.9 acres) property in a wooded area known as Pinos de Anchorena, then in the southern outskirts of the seaside city. Christened the Casa sobre el Arroyo ("House on the Stream") upon its completion in 1946, it was built for his father Alberto Williams - who by then had fallen ill, and thus never lived in the home. The property was home to a sister of Williams' until her death in 1966. The house was purchased by Mar del Plata's media businessman Héctor Lago Beitía in 1968 and used by a radio station, LU9 Emisora Mar del Plata, until the latter closure by the last Argentine dictatorship in 1977. The station's jingle gave the house its popular nickname: Casa del Puente ("The Bridge House").

Lago maintained the compound until his death in 1991, and it was declared a National Historic Monument in 1997. The lack of funding for its preservation, however, led the historic building to be ultimately abandoned, vandalized and gutted by fire in September 2004.

The derelict house was cleaned and secured by the municipal government in 2005. Efforts to recover the landmark resumed in earnest in late 2021, and on 20 April 2023, the fully restored Casa del Puente was reopened as a museum by President Alberto Fernández.

On 8 February 2024, the restoration project was awarded the World Monuments Fund award.

== See also ==
- Fallingwater
- Casa Curutchet
- Torre Tanque
- Torreón del Monje
- Palacio Arabe
- Villa Normandy
- Mar del Plata style
