= Torre Tanque =

- Tank Tower
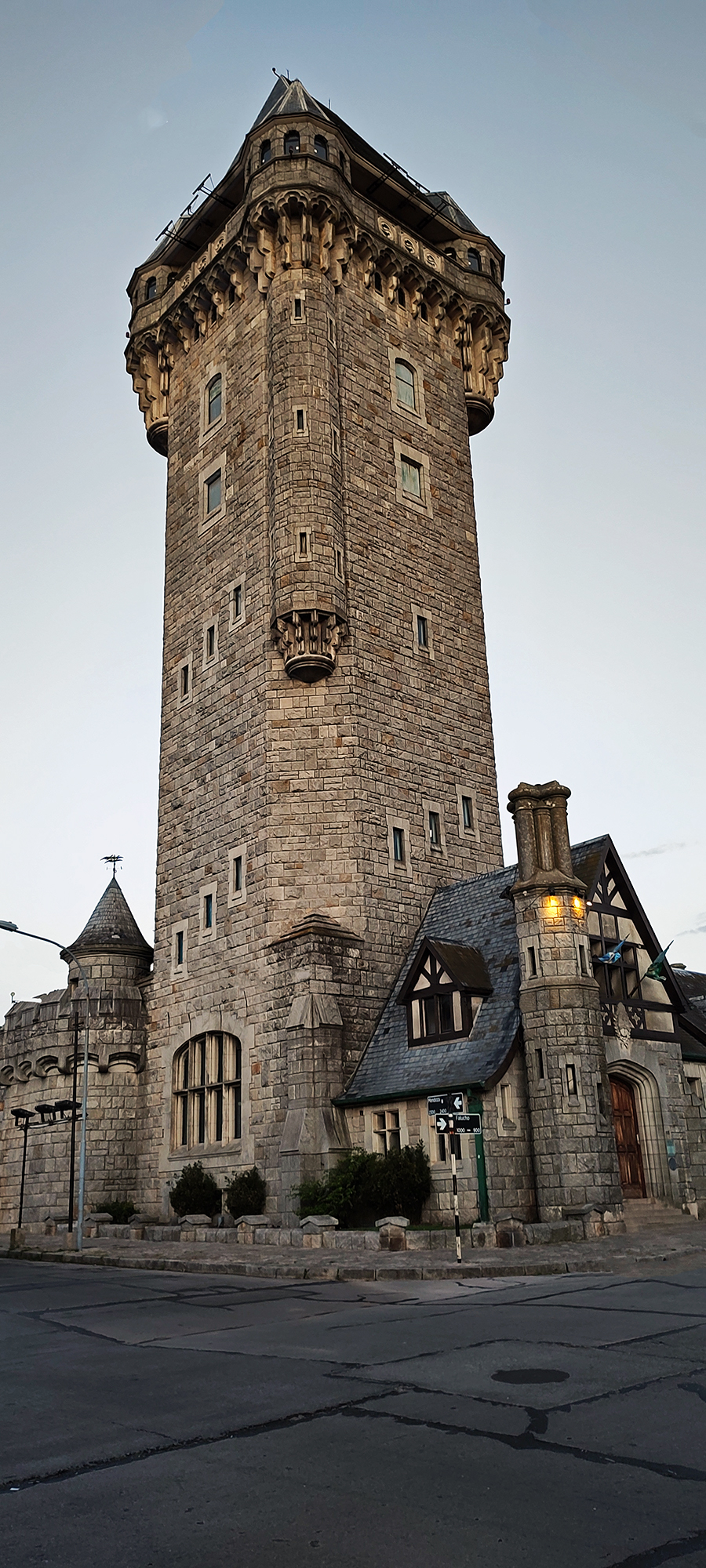
- Tank Tower view from the west (2021)
- Interactive map of the Torre Tanque area

General information
- Type: Water Tower
- Architectural style: Tudor revival
- Location: Falucho 995; Mar del Plata; Argentina
- Coordinates: 38°00′47″S 57°32′07″W
- Construction started: 1939
- Completed: 1943

Design and construction
- Architect: Cornelio Lange

The Torre Tanque (English: Tank Tower) is a water tower in the city of Mar del Plata, Argentina, that supplies potable water to Mar del Plata downtown. The tower was built between 1939 and 1943 to replace an old concrete water tower in place since 1911. The building is designed in Tudor Revival style. The tower is operated by the local Obras Sanitarias Sociedad de Estado (OSSE) water distribution company, a mixed-ownership corporation.

== History ==
When Mar del Plata became the resort of choice of Argentina’s upper-class at the end of the 19th century, one of the places favoured by the visitors to build their summer houses was the area of Stella Maris hills. The need of fresh water, until then provided by windmills, led to the construction of a concrete water tower in 1911. The man behind the project was entrepreneur Miguel Lanus. This tower could hold 2,000 liters (530 U.S. gal) and supplied water for 14 blocks around. When Stella Maris grew as an exclusive neighbourhood, this original tower looked at odds with the surrounding architecture, thus Obras Sanitarias de la Nación (OSN), the federal agency that was in charge of water distribution in Argentina, decided to build a larger reservoir with improved aesthetics. Architect Cornelio Lange won the public tender for the construction works, which started on 1 September 1939. The tower’s cistern was filled in for the first time on 30 January 1943, during an opening ceremony attended by president Ramón Castillo. The tank tower was declared National Historic Monument in 2013.

== Features ==
Lange designed a Tudor revival tower in harmony with the eclectic architecture of the surrounding landscape. The cistern can hold 13,000,000 liters (3,400,000 U.S. gal) and the elevated tank 500,000 liters (130,000 U.S. gal). A total of 5,753 m3 of stone and 7,363 m3 of earth were dug out from the hill in order to build the reservoir, which is 6 m below the ground. The quartzite rocks, known in Argentina as Piedra Mar del Plata, were later used to clad the exterior, a key feature of the vernacular Mar del Plata style. The building is 40.75 m tall, and lays on a hill at 40 m over the sea level. The tower lookout can be accessed through a 194-step spiral staircase or by elevator.

One of the most emblematic attractions of Mar del Plata, the tower can be visited daily from 8 a.m. to 2:45 p. m., with guided visits at 4:00 p.m.. The lookout allows a panoramic view of the city center, the beaches north of Cabo Corrientes and the hills west and south of Mar del Plata.

== See also ==
- Casa del Puente
- Palacio Arabe
- Torreón del Monje
- Villa Normandy
- Mar del Plata style
