= Torreón del Monje =

Castle replica in Mar del Plata, Argentina

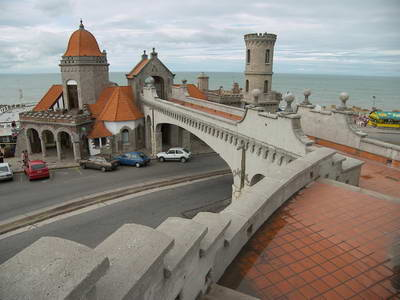
- Former names: Torre Belvedere, Torre Pueyrredon

General information
- Status: Intact
- Type: Replica
- Architectural style: Medieval; Neogothic
- Location: Mar del Plata, Buenos Aires Province, Argentina
- Coordinates: 38°00′29″S 57°32′00″W
- Completed: February 28, 1904

Technical details
- Floor count: 2

Design and construction
- Architects: Carlos Nordmann; Eduardo Lanús; Federico Woodgate

Website
- torreondelmonje.com.ar

The Torreón del Monje (English: The Monk's Keep) is a castle replica located in the city center of Mar del Plata, Argentina, near the coast of the Atlantic Ocean. Constructed in 1904, the building has had various previous uses, including as a clubhouse, a naval office, and a teahouse. The building has gained notoriety as a tourist destination due to the alleged presence of ghosts in the building's tower.

== History ==
Inaugurated on February 28, 1904, the Torreón del Monje was financed by Ernesto Tornquist, a businessman who patronized several beautification projects in Mar del Plata, and designed by German architect Carlos Nordmann. The project had primarily occurred to spur tourism in the city. The design of the fortress was medieval, while the bell tower was made in Jesuit style. The building, initially just a keep with a teahouse, was inaugurated as the Torre Belvedere, before being renamed to Torre Pueyrredon, then finally to the Torreón del Monje by the 1940s. The teahouse was established to host visitors of Egaña's grotto, a cave on the front of a precambrian cliff near the building. The grotto was removed in the first years of the 20 century to open a seaside road between Torreón del Monje and Cabo Corrientes. Tornquist eventually donated the building to the city of Mar del Plata.

Following an expansion in 1927 by architects Eduardo Lanús and Federico Woodgate that added a large terrace, the building became the center of a pigeon shooting club, who began using the Torreón del Monje in the 1930s. The club was often utilized by wealthy visitors, who would kill the birds near the sea so they would fall onto the terrace. Non-members would often come to the club to eat the birds. The sport of pigeon shooting was eventually banned, and in the 1940s it became the headquarters for the Circle of Navy Officers, until the building was left abandoned in the 1960s. In 1979, after an unsuccessful attempt by the municipal government to auction off the building, the site was purchased by entrepreneur Domingo Parato for renovation, which partly involved adding sand to the coastal areas adjacent to the building.

Further renovations in the early 2000s saw the addition of a bridge which also functions as a pedestrian walkway, a restaurant and a gallery. In 2017, a beach club was opened on a site adjacent to the building, as well as a shop and a terrace. As part of the building's 120th anniversary, a cultural exhibit was held which included a model car from Argentine racer Juan Manuel Fangio.

== Legend ==
According to legend, a fortress placed on the site of the building was the center of a romance between a Spanish captain and an indigenous woman, who, after a storming attempt of the fortress by a cacique who wanted to take her, was thrown into the ocean alongside him. The legend had allegedly been chronicled by Antonio Santillán, a 17th century priest, however in reality the myth was inspired by a work from Chilean poet Alberto del Solar. The supposed legend states their souls never left the tower, and many employees and visitors have reportedly heard sounds from the tower. The Torreón del Monje and its associated stories are considered to have been created in order to portray Mar del Plata as an older city with a more storied past.

== See also ==
- Villa Normandy
- Casa del Puente
- Torre Tanque
- Palacio Arabe
- Mar del Plata style
