= Villa Normandy =

Building in Mar del Plata, Argentina

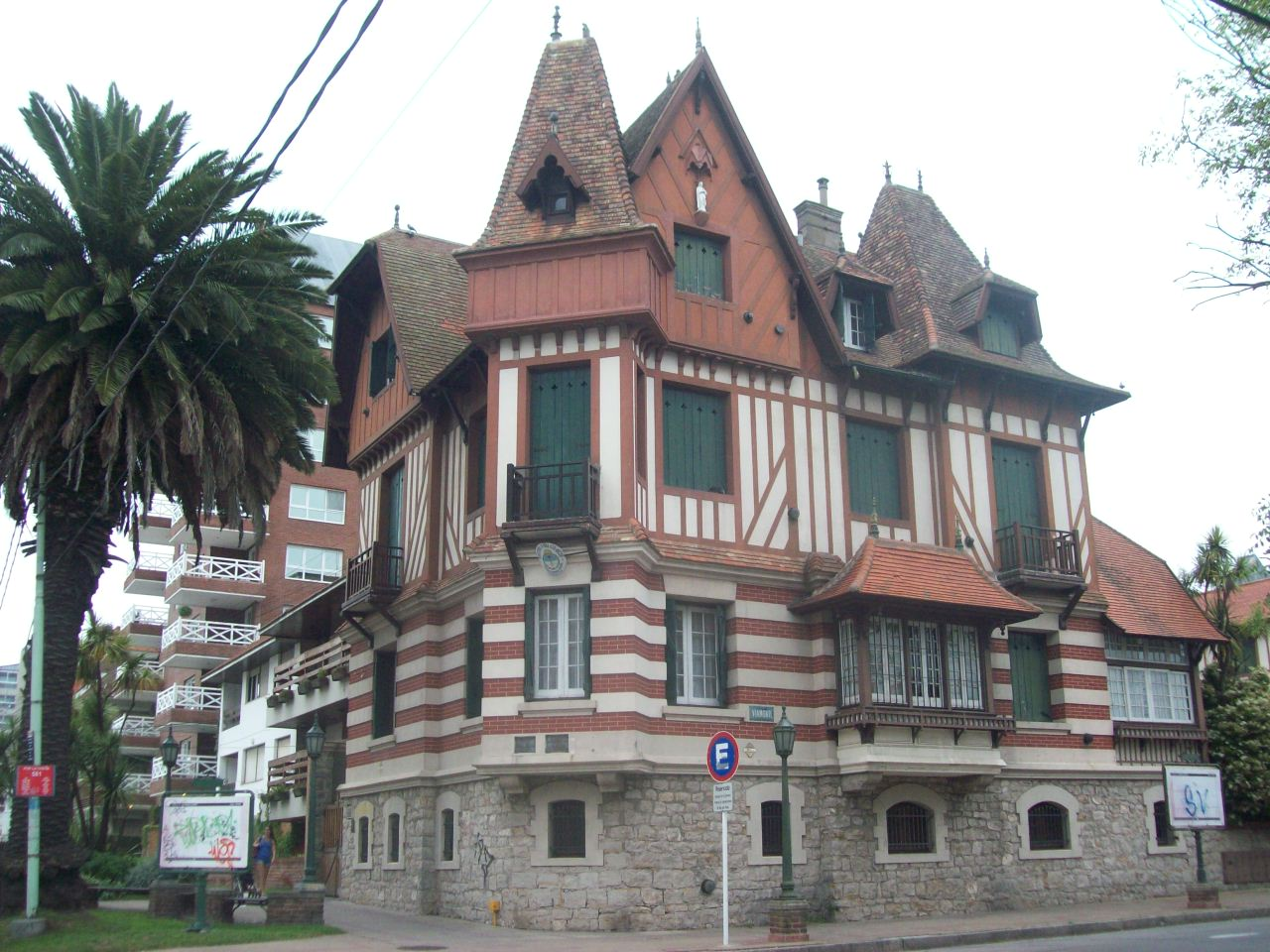
- Villa Normandy in 2013
- Interactive map of the Villa Normandy area

General information
- Location: Avenida Colón 1090
- Coordinates: 38°00′40.7″S 57°32′06.6″W
- Year built: 1918-1920
- Opened: 1920

Technical details
- Floor count: 4

Design and construction
- Architect: Gastón Mallet

Villa Normandy is a historic vintage home located in the city of Mar del Plata, Argentina. Constructed in 1920, the building was designed to replicate a villa in the French region of Normandy.

== Design ==
The building consists of four floors, with the building material varying by floor. The facade of the first floor consists of stone, the second plaster and brick, and the last two being made in polychrome style. The building's width increases with its height, with the fixtures of the building varying in color. The intermediate floors were constructed through brick vaults with metal joists as supports. The floors themselves consisted of large beams of pine. The building also utilized double stone walls as exteriors. The tiles used on the building were of Norman style.

== History ==
Villa Normandy was constructed in 1918 by French architect Gastón Mallet. Mallet had been asked to build the villa by Félix Delor, a veteran of the First World War who wanted a villa constructed in the style of the town where he was born. The home is a near-exact replica of a villa located in Houlgate, France, with both buildings having the same number of floors, the same dimensions and are designed as corner homes. The location of the building along the Villa Colón was chosen for its high elevation which allowed views of the Atlantic Ocean. The connection between the two buildings was not established until 2005, when a screenwriter, using Google Street View, discovered the similarities between the Villa Normandy and the Houlgate home.

Villa Normandy has been used as a consulate building for the nation of Italy and a public office. Today, it is occupied by an insurance company. Villa Normandy survived the large-scale demolitions which occurred in its neighborhood in the 1950s. The building was declared a Provincial Historical Architectural Monument by the Argentine government in 1991. The patio of the building, formerly abandoned, was converted into a cafe.

== See also ==
- Torreon del Monje
- Torre Tanque
- Casa del Puente
- Palacio Arabe
- Mar del Plata style
