= Palacio Arabe =

Condominium in Mar del Plata, Argentina

Arab palace
- Palacio Árabe
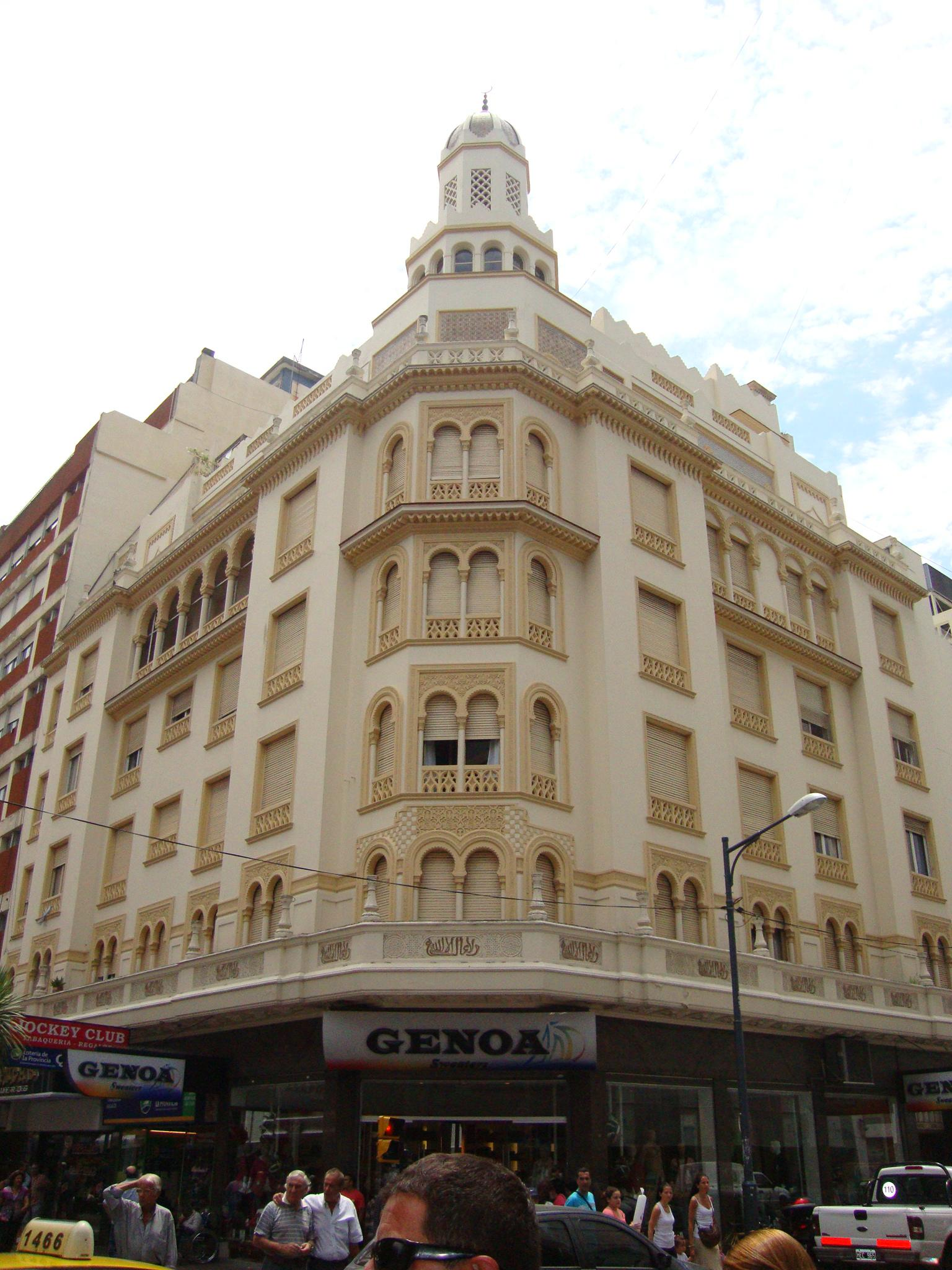
- Palacio Árabe view from San Martín street (2010)
- Interactive map of the Arab palace area

General information
- Type: Residential
- Location: Córdoba 1681; Mar del Plata; Argentina
- Coordinates: 37°59′57″S 57°32′49″W
- Construction started: 1945
- Completed: 1949

Design and construction
- Architect: Valentín Brodsky
- Main contractor: Julián Galli

Palacio Árabe (en: Arab Palace) is a Neo-Mudéjar building in downtown Mar del Plata, Argentina.

== History ==
The Palacio Árabe was built by Syrian immigrant Jalil Mahmud Hassein (Spanish form Julián Galli) who during a trip to the Iberian Peninsula became captivated by the Moorish architecture. Hassein then envisaged a six-stored condominium in Mar del Plata featuring the characteristics of the mudéjar style. He commissioned the project to architect Valentín Brodsky, and the works began in 1945, under the direction of Florencio Marco.

== Architecture ==
The residential building was completed in 1949 with five stores instead of the six originally foresaw by Galli, due to restrictions imposed by local regulations at the time.

The Palacio Árabe combines different Moorish and Islamic ornaments, like the typical arcades, filigree decoration and polichrome tiles. The building tops off with a minaret on the chamfer.

A plaque on the building hall was dedicated to Galli by the Lebanese community in 1995.

== See also ==
- Torre Tanque
- Casa del Puente
- Torreon del Monje
- Villa Normandy
- Mar del Plata style
