= Curutchet House =

House by Le Corbusier in La Plata, Argentina

Coordinates: 34°54′41″S 57°56′31″W

- Casa Curutchet
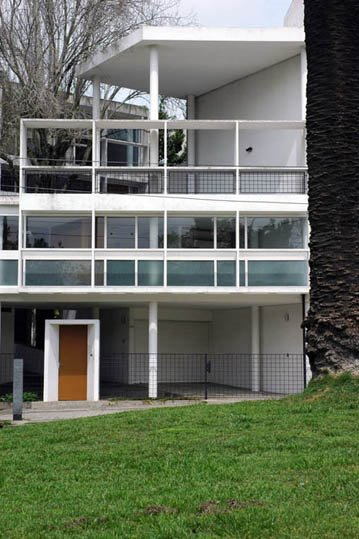

General information
- Location: La Plata, Argentina
- Address: Avenida 53 Nº320, 1900
- Completed: 1949 - 53
- Owner: Dr. Pedro Domingo Curutchet

Design and construction
- Architect(s): Le Corbusier

UNESCO World Heritage Site
- Official name: The Architectural Work of Le Corbusier, an Outstanding Contribution to the Modern Movement
- Type: Cultural
- Criteria: i, ii, vi
- Designated: 2016 (40th session)
- Reference no.: 1321-011
- Region: Latin America and the Caribbean

National Historic Monument of Argentina
- Designated: 2006

The Curutchet House, La Plata, Argentina, is a building by Le Corbusier. It was commissioned by Dr. Pedro Domingo Curutchet, a surgeon, in 1948 and included a small medical office on the ground floor. The house consists of four main levels with a courtyard between the house and the clinic. The building faces the Paseo del Bosque park. The main facade incorporates a brise soleil.

== History ==
Construction began in 1949 under the supervision of Amancio Williams and was completed in 1953.

=== Design and construction ===
The house exemplifies Le Corbusier's five points of architecture and incorporates a ramp and a spiral staircase. The house represents a landmark in Corbusier own trajectory because it exemplifies how cultural and historical characteristics of architecture (the elements of the traditional Argentine courtyard house) can be rewritten using Corbusier's five points of modern architecture.

Dr. Curutchet's house is also one of the very few buildings that Corbusier built attached to pre-existing buildings and perfectly responds to a historical context. With this house Corbusier proved, more than with any of his other projects, that modern architecture could in fact be in a harmonious dialogue with traditional architecture.

Inside the house, the marvellous architecture can be seen. There is a tree inside the house i.e. the care was taken while designing that the tree will retain and still not disturb the beauty of the house. The terrace, folding wooden curtains, inclined stair design, wardrobes, kitchen are designed during 1949-1953 and are the same, which are used in present era as modern designs.

=== Restoration ===
The house was restored from 1986 to 1988 during the centennial of Le Corbusier's birth and declared a national landmark by Argentina's Commission on National Landmarks. It currently houses the Buenos Aires professional association of architects, the Colegio de Arquitectos, and is open to the public for tours.

In July 2016, the house and sixteen other works by Le Corbusier were inscribed as UNESCO World Heritage Sites.

== In popular media ==
- The 2009 film El hombre de al lado was shot in the house.
- The 2018 film La Obra Secreta describes the story of an architect (the Curutchet House museum guide) and his relationship with Le Corbusier legacy, intertwined with Le Corbusier works and thoughts. It was fully filmed in the house and contains detailed views of the interiors and surrounding environment.

== See also ==
- Carpenter Center for the Visual Arts, Le Corbusier's sole other building in the Americas.
- Casa del Puente
