= George Gardner =

George Gardner may refer to:

- George R. Gardner (1837–1897), American politician
- George Gardner (coach) (1898–1974), American football and basketball coach
- George Gardner (botanist) (1810–1849), Scottish naturalist
- George Gardner (ice hockey) (1942–2006), Canadian goaltender
- George Washington Gardner (1778–1838), whaleship captain, member of the Gardner whaling family
- George Gardiner (boxer) (1877–1954), American boxer, also known as George Gardner
- George Gardner (priest) (1853–1925), English Anglican priest
- George Gardiner (settler) (1608/1615–1677), founding settler of Newport, Rhode Island, also known as George Gardner
- George W. Gardner (1834–1911), 28th and 30th mayor of Cleveland

== See also ==
- George Gardiner (disambiguation)
- Georgia Gardner (born 1944), American politician
- Georgie Gardner (born 1970), Australian journalist
