= Herb Boschen =

Australian rules footballer

Personal information
- Full name: Herb Boschen
- Born: 3 March 1908
- Died: 12 October 1989 (aged 81)
- Original team: Beulah
- Height: 188 cm (6 ft 2 in)
- Weight: 91 kg (201 lb)

Playing career^{1}
Years	Club	Games (Goals)
1932	South Melbourne	4 (0)
- ^{1} Playing statistics correct to the end of 1932.

Herb Boschen (3 March 1908 – 12 October 1989) was an Australian rules footballer who played with South Melbourne in the Victorian Football League (VFL).
