= George Gardiner (footballer) =

Australian rules footballer

Personal information
- Full name: George Gardiner
- Born: 15 December 1877; Euroa, Victoria
- Died: 28 February 1933 (aged 55); Wangaratta, Victoria

Playing career^{1}
Years	Club	Games (Goals)
1906	St Kilda	2 (2)
- ^{1} Playing statistics correct to the end of 1906.

George Gardiner (15 December 1877 – 28 February 1933) was an Australian rules footballer who played with St Kilda in the Victorian Football League (VFL).

Gardiner was recruited from Milawa Football Club.
