= Peter Whiteley (cricketer, born 1935) =

English cricketer

Personal information
- Full name: Peter Whiteley
- Born: 12 August 1935; Rochdale, Lancashire, England
- Died: 28 October 1989 (aged 54); Crompton, Lancashire, England
- Batting: Right-handed
- Bowling: Slow left-arm orthodox
- Relatives: Wife Shiela Whiteley, Children Steven Whiteley and Jill Whiteley

Domestic team information
- Years: Team
- 1957–1958: Lancashire

Career statistics
Competition	First-class
Matches	5
Runs scored	86
Batting average	14.33
100s/50s	–/–
Top score	32
Balls bowled	600
Wickets	9
Bowling average	29.55
5 wickets in innings	–
10 wickets in match	–
Best bowling	3/70
Catches/stumpings	2/–
- Source: Cricinfo, 12 October 2011

Peter Whiteley (12 August 1935 – 28 October 1989) was an English cricketer. Whiteley was a right-handed batsman who bowled slow left-arm orthodox. He was born at Rochdale, Lancashire.

He made his first-class debut for Lancashire against Nottinghamshire in the 1957 County Championship. He made four further first-class appearances, the last of which came against the Combined Services in 1958. In his five first-class appearances, he scored 86 runs at an average of 14.33, with a high score of 32. This score was made against Hampshire in 1957 and came at a crucial time during the match. Lancashire had been bowled out in their first-innings for 89 and conceding a 74 run deficit by the time Hampshire's first-innings ended on 163, Lancashire found themselves 16/4 in their second-innings. Geoff Pullar and Jack Bond then added 115 for the fifth wicket, before Bond was dismissed. Whiteley came to crease and added 101 for the sixth wicket with Pullar, ensuring Lancashire's escape and contributing to a 95 run victory. With his slow left-arm bowling, he took 9 wickets at a bowling average of 29.55, with best figures of 3/70.

Whiteley died at Crompton, Lancashire on 28 October 1989. Peter Whiteley died of a heart attack on Crompton and Royton golf course while playing golf with two doctors who was unhable to save him.
