= George Rae (cricketer) =

English cricketer and British Army officer

Personal information
- Full name: George Hugh Kenefick Rae
- Born: 27 April 1911; Madras, Madras Presidency, British India
- Died: 31 October 1989 (aged 78); Exeter, Devon, England
- Batting: Unknown
- Bowling: Unknown

Domestic team information
- Years: Team
- 1935/36–1937/38: Europeans
- 1936/37–1937/38: Madras

Career statistics
Competition	First-class
Matches	4
Runs scored	122
Batting average	24.40
100s/50s	–/1
Top score	98
Balls bowled	36
Wickets	1
Bowling average	32.00
5 wickets in innings	–
10 wickets in match	–
Best bowling	1/5
Catches/stumpings	–/–
- Source: ESPNcricinfo, 7 June 2022

George Hugh Kenefick Rae (27 April 1911 – 31 October 1989) was an English first-class cricketer and British Army officer.

Rae was born in British India at Madras in April 1911. He later studied at King's College at the University of Cambridge. Rae spent the 1930s in British India, where he made two appearances apiece in first-class cricket between 1936 and 1938 for the Europeans cricket team and Madras. He scored 122 runs in these matches, with his highest score of 98 coming for the Europeans against the Indians in 1936. Rae was an emergency commission as a second lieutenant into the Royal Armoured Corps in April 1940. Rae later died at Exeter in October 1989.
