= Alfred Zulkowski =

German footballer

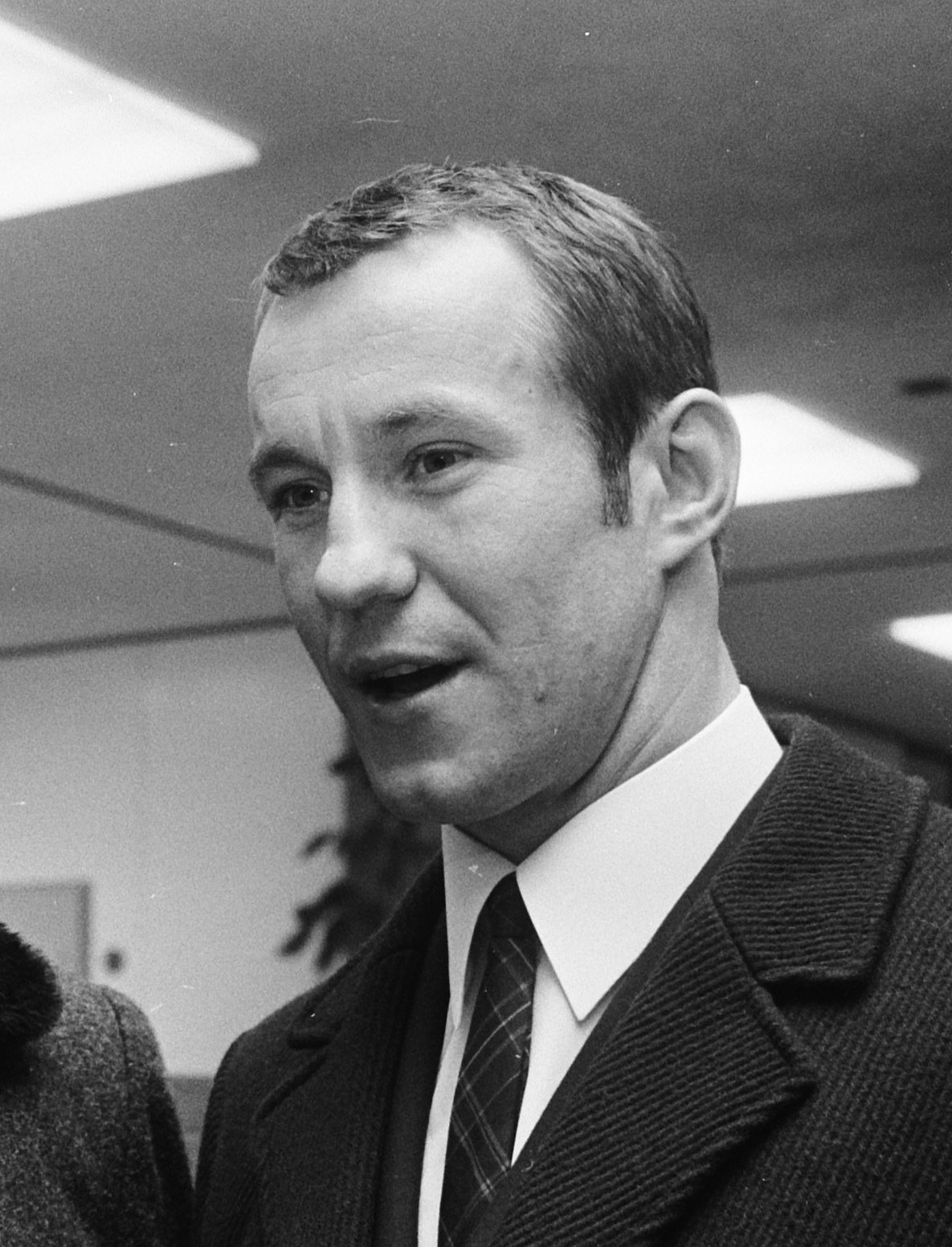
- Zulkowski in 1970

Personal information
- Date of birth: August 12, 1940
- Place of birth: Wismar, Germany
- Date of death: October 19, 1989 (aged 49)
- Place of death: Wismar, East Germany
- Position: Goalkeeper

Youth career
- –1959: Motor Wismar

Senior career*
Years	Team	Apps	(Gls)
1960–1961	Vorwärts Neubrandenburg	14	(0)
1962–1971	ASK / FC Vorwärts Berlin	169	(0)
1971–1975	BSG NARVA Berlin	21	(0)

International career
1962	East Germany	1	(0)
- * Club domestic league appearances and goals

Alfred Zulkowski (August 12, 1940 – October 19, 1989) was a German footballer.

The goalkeeper made a single appearance in the East Germany national team in 1962 match against Guinea.

In the East German top-flight he became the first-choice goalie of Vorwärts Berlin in the late 1960s.
