= Gurdial Singh Phul =

Indian dramatist (1911–1989)

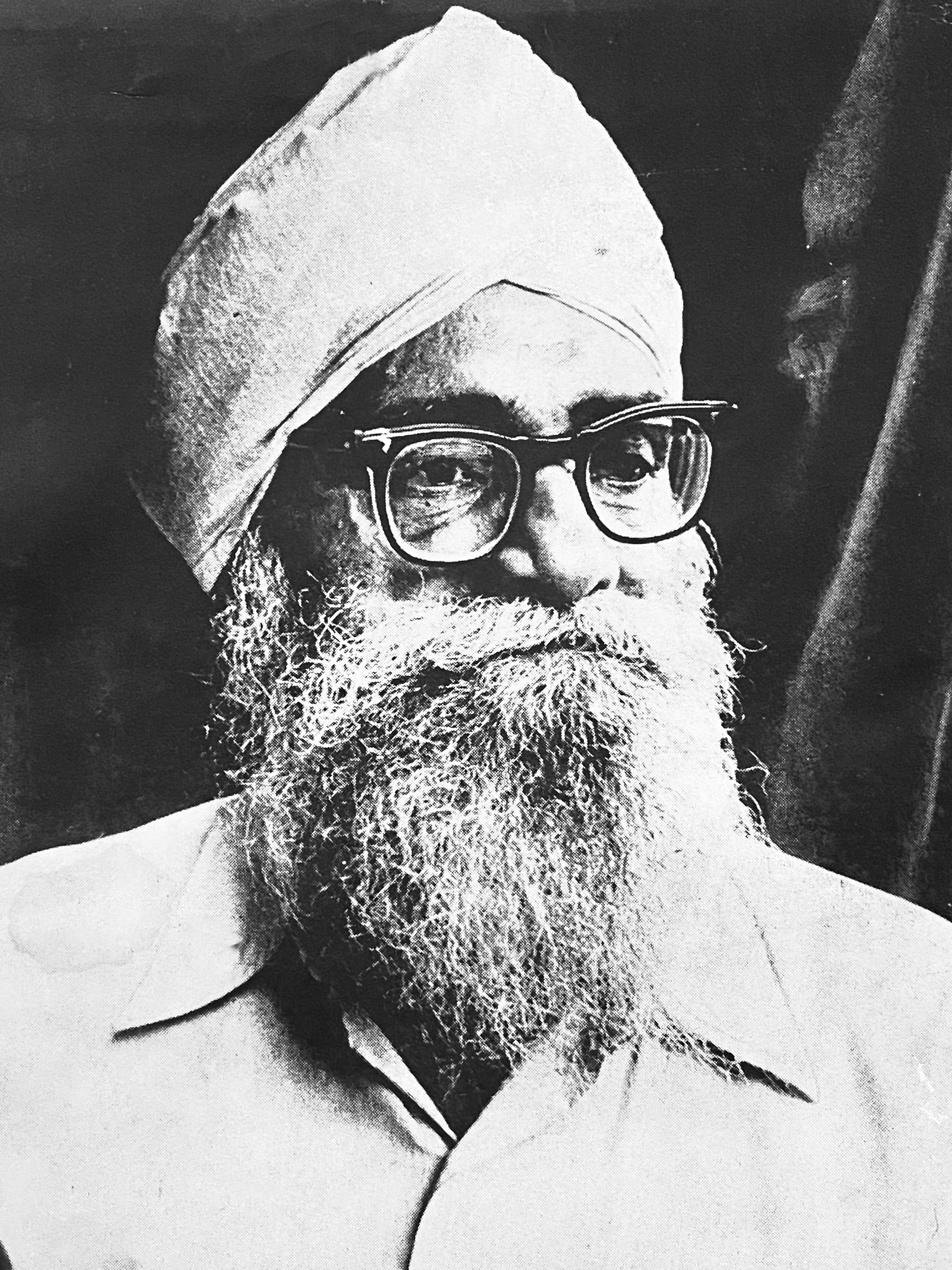
Dr. Gurdial Singh Phul

Gurdial Singh Phul (1911 – 20 October 1989) is an Indian Punjabi dramatist.
