= Ray Thomas (footballer, born 1926) =

Australian rules footballer

Personal information
- Full name: Ray Thomas
- Born: 3 April 1926
- Died: 3 October 1989 (aged 63)
- Original team: Flemington CYMS (CYMSFA)
- Height: 175 cm (5 ft 9 in)
- Weight: 83 kg (183 lb)
- Position: Back pocket

Playing career^{1}
Years	Club	Games (Goals)
1945	Essendon	4 (0)
1946–47	South Melbourne	2 (0)
Total		6 (0)
- ^{1} Playing statistics correct to the end of 1947.

Ray Thomas (3 April 1926 – 3 October 1989) was an Australian rules footballer who played with Essendon and South Melbourne in the Victorian Football League (VFL). He also played with country side, Warrnambool, in 1946.
