= Theodore Lorber =

American fencer (1906–1989)

Personal information
- Born: October 24, 1906 Zanesville, Ohio, United States
- Died: October 11, 1989 (aged 82) Milpitas, California, United States

Sport
- Sport: Fencing

Theodore Lorber (October 24, 1906 – October 11, 1989) was an American fencer. He competed in the individual foil event at the 1932 Summer Olympics.
