= Amancio Williams =

Argentine architect (1913–1989)

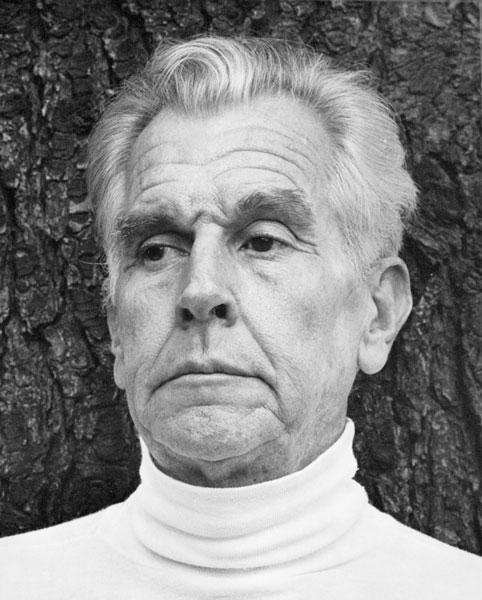
- Born: 19 February 1913; Buenos Aires, Argentina
- Died: 14 October 1989 (aged 76); Buenos Aires
- Education: Universidad de Buenos Aires
- Occupation: Architect
- Spouse: Delfina Gálvez Bunge (1913–2014)
- Buildings: Bridge House (Casa del Arroyo/Casa del Puente), 1946; Resistencia International Airport, 1971

Amancio Williams (19 February 1913 – 14 October 1989) was an Argentine architect. He is among his country's leading exponents of modern architecture.

== Life and work ==
Amancio Williams was born in Buenos Aires in 1913. His father, Alberto Williams, was a well-known composer of chamber music and the founder of the Buenos Aires Music Conservatory. Williams Jr. enrolled at the School of Engineering of the University of Buenos Aires (UBA), though an interest in aviation led him to leave school during his third year. This sabbatical ended in 1938, when he enrolled at UBA's School of Architecture.

He graduated in 1941 and created a portfolio of numerous prospective designs, though he found buyers for only a few, and among these was a modernist residence in Mar del Plata commissioned by his own father. The elder Williams had purchased a 2 hectares (4.9 acres) property in what were then the wooded outskirts of the seaside city. A stream running through the land became the centerpiece for the architect's 1942 design.

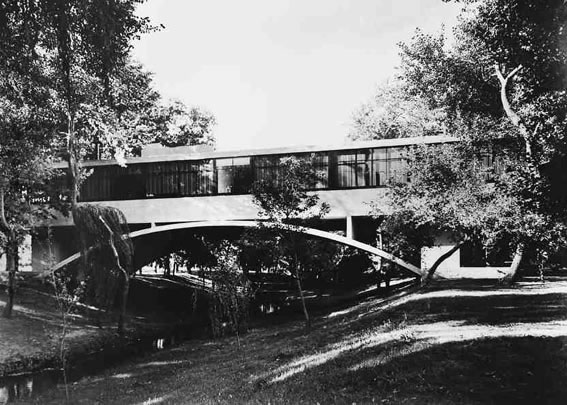
Casa sobre el Arroyo - popularly known as the Casa del Puente (Bridge House) - in Mar del Plata

Williams and his wife, Delfina Gálvez Bunge, also designed the home's minimalist interiors, fashioning the interior doors, fixtures and boiserie in a nearby workshop, as well most of the furniture. The concrete used in its construction was also chemically weatherized at the facility, so done to allow its use in the design without the need for cladding, which Williams felt would take from the "honesty of the materials".

Christened the Casa sobre el Arroyo ("House on the Stream") upon its completion in 1946, it was built for his father Alberto Williams — who by then had fallen ill, and thus never lived in the home. The house is listed among the most famous modernist buildings of the 20th century. The house was declared a National Historic Monument in 1997. This failed to secure it adequate funding for its maintenance, however, and the historic property was ultimately abandoned, vandalized and gutted by fire in September 2004. The derelict building was cleaned and secured by the municipal government in 2005. Works to recover the landmark began in earnest in late 2021, and on 20 April 2023, the fully restored Bridge House was reopened by President Alberto Fernández.

His design proposals in 1945 for a new international airport, to be built on the Río de la Plata and connected to the city via causeway, were rejected in favor of what became Ministro Pistarini International Airport, and aside from three Corrientes Province hospitals, he would complete no significant government works in subsequent decades. He was assigned by Le Corbusier, however, to supervise construction for the Curutchet House, a residence designed in 1949 by the Swiss architect for Dr. Pedro Curutchet, a prominent La Plata physician.

He was invited to display his ideas on acoustics at La Sorbonne, and the Dean of the Harvard Graduate School of Design, Walter Gropius, organized exhibits of his works in 1951 and 1955, on which latter occasion Williams was a guest lecturer. During the 1950s, he developed designs based on what he called hollow vaults. These were concrete pillars that, by their design, could drain rainwater while supporting the building above as stilts. He later employed the concept for the 1966 Bunge y Born exhibit at the La Rural Exposition grounds and in 1968 for the German Embassy, both in Buenos Aires, as well as for a monument to the reconstruction of Berlin.

Williams was inducted into the American Institute of Architects as an honorary member in 1962. After 1974, he worked on "the city humanity needs," a plan for an above-ground metropolis supported by his hollow vaults for the purpose of reducing land use. He was also contracted by the Argentine government to design a self-contained city planned for Argentine Antarctica, though his design, presented in 1980, was never carried out. Williams died in Buenos Aires in 1989 at age 76, and was buried in Recoleta Cemetery.

A temporary structure used in 1966 as part of the La Rural expo grounds was revived by one of his sons, Claudio, and was included as a centerpiece of a waterfront park inaugurated in 1999 in the Buenos Aires suburb of Vicente López as the Monument to the End of the Millennium.
