= George Gardiner (cricketer) =

Australian cricketer

Personal information
- Born: 27 November 1914; Perth, Western Australia
- Died: 17 October 1989 (aged 74); Melbourne, Victoria
- Batting: Right-handed
- Bowling: Right arm medium
- Source: Cricinfo, 27 September 2017

George Gardiner (27 November 1914 – 17 October 1989) was an Australian cricketer. He played six first-class matches for Western Australia between 1934/35 and 1937/38.
