= Mar del Plata style =

Argentine architectural style

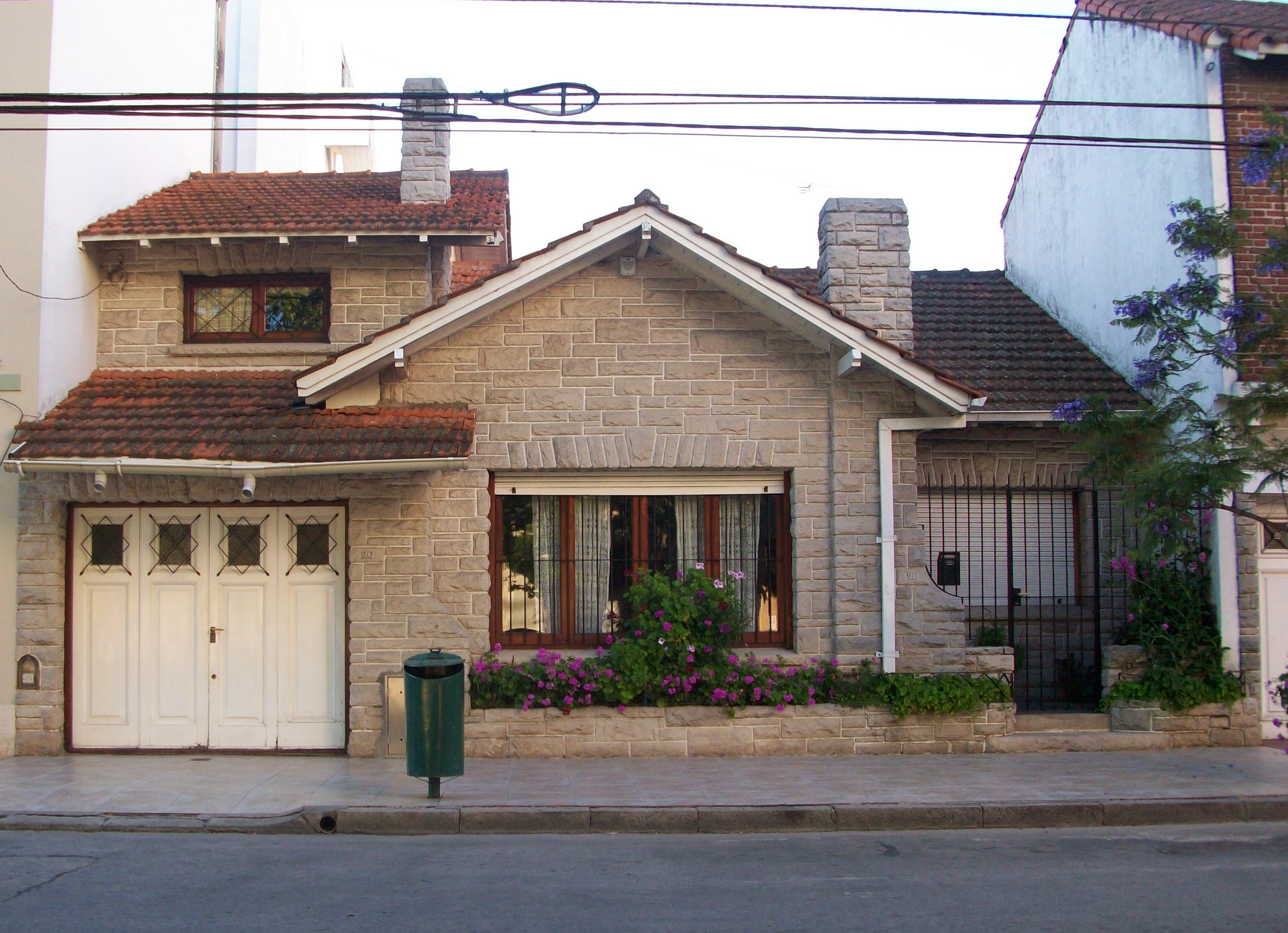
A typical chalet marplatense

The Mar del Plata style (Spanish: Estilo Mar del Plata, chalet Mar del Plata or chalet marplatense) is a vernacular architectural style very popular during the decades between 1935 and 1950 mainly in the Argentine resort city of Mar del Plata, but extended to nearby coastal towns like Miramar and Necochea. Its influence also spread to other regions of the country like Buenos Aires, Córdoba and Santa Fe.

== Origins ==
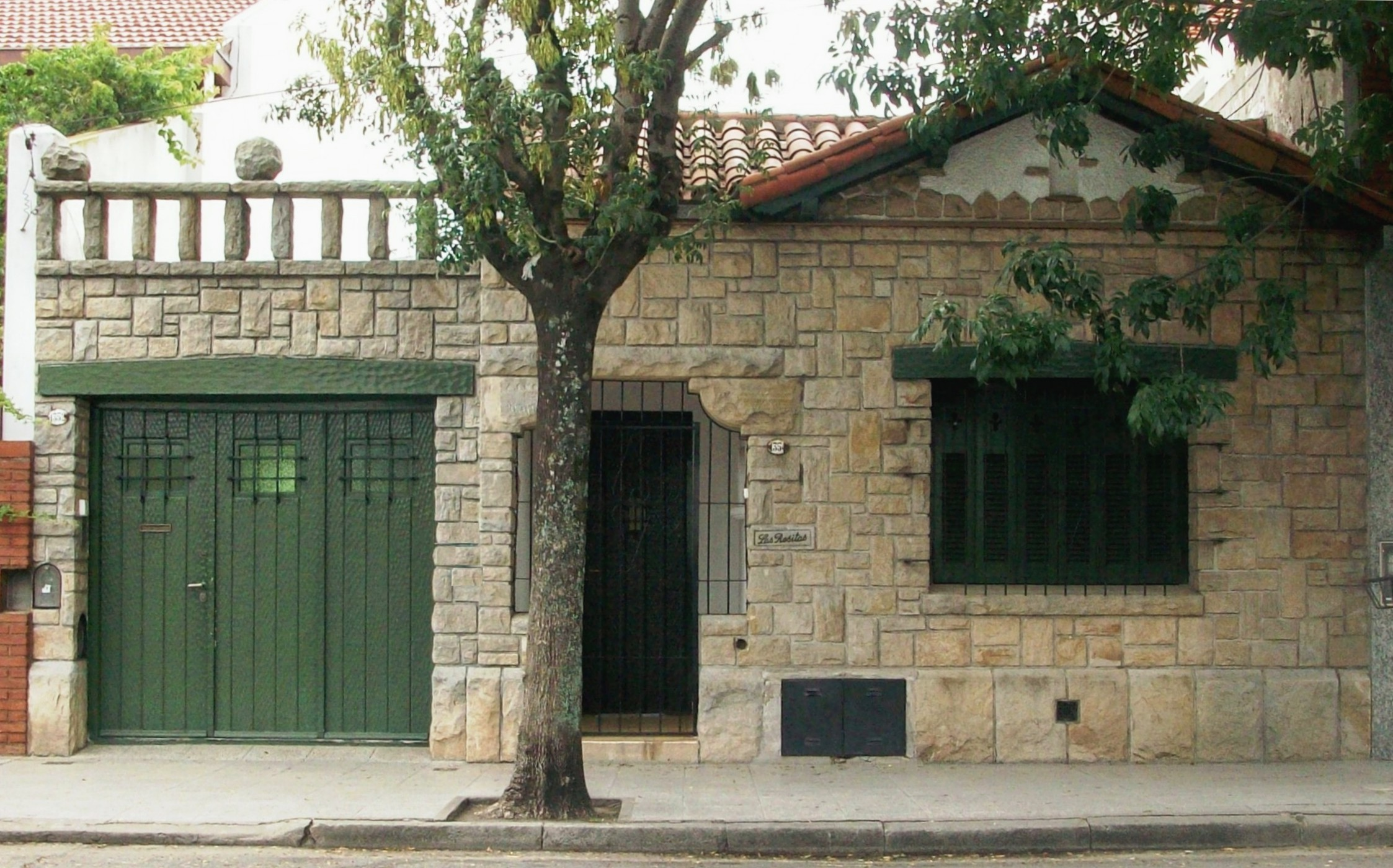
Early example of Mar del Plata style

The style is also often associated in Argentina with the californiano ("Californian"), another vernacular type of house close connected with the American Mission Revival style. Mar del Plata style's features, however, are more related to the older Mar del Plata's picturesque architecture, an eclectic style already popular among the upper-class people who used to spend summertime in this resort city between 1885 and 1945, and to the American Craftsman style. The precursor of the style was the Italian-born architectural engineer Alula Baldassarini, who popularized the use of stone on the frontispieces in 1925. Some of these early examples were labeled chalet inglés ("English bungalow"), a type of bungalow or cottage which flourished between 1925 and 1935. Baldassarini also developed a cladding technique known as bastón roto ("'broken stick"), which consisted in rectangular stone bricks irregularly arranged on vertical and horizontal joints.

At the beginning of the 20th century, the upward social mobility was quite more dynamic in Mar del Plata than in Buenos Aires itself, paving the road for a strong middle class, based on tourist services, the building industry and a prosperous commerce. It was during this time that a new urban profile was born in the city, not by a process in which guidelines were designed by technocrats, but by a "democratic" one. By the decade of 1940, the construction sector was regarded as the main industry of Mar del Plata. This is the environment in which the Mar del Plata style emerged.

The chalet marplatense became the materialization of the middle-class ideals, and it is at crossroads between the upper-class summer picturesque residences and the domestic scale, regarding both its social and architectural syncretism. The houses also developed among the immigrants a sense of belonging to their new country.

The rise of the style broke the hegemony of Buenos Aires within Argentina's architectural scene.

== Features ==
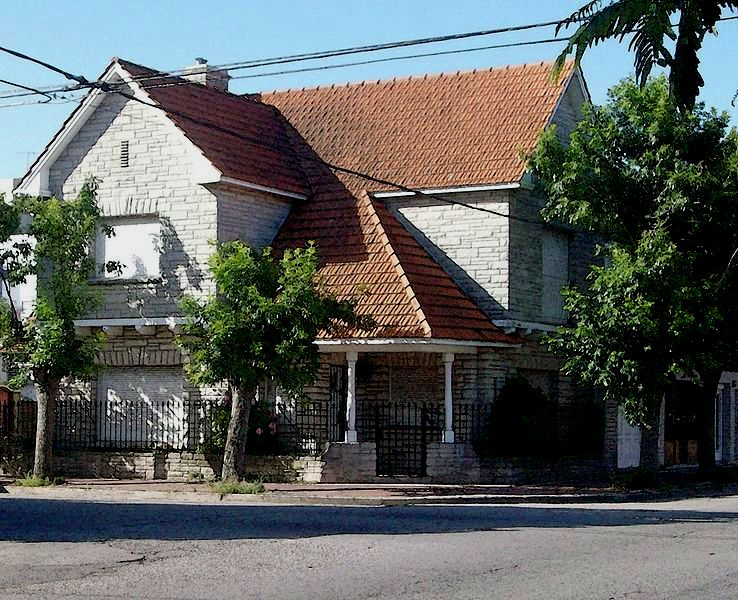
A two-story Mar del Plata style chalet, designed by Raúl Camusso

The chalets were at first the production of builders with a great experience in the building of eclectic style mansions for summer, but without the skills of a real technician. Nonetheless, the first generation of architects and architectural engineers from Mar del Plata, led by young professionals like Auro Tiribelli, Alberto Córsico Piccolini, José V. Coll, Gabriel Barroso or Raúl Camusso played a key role in the consolidation of the style during the late 1930s an early 1940s. Some sources think of architect Tiribelli as the creator of this type of house.

The chalet marplatense is the translation of the main characteristics of the eclecticism to the domestic space: quartzite stoned facades, monk and nun roof tiles or French tiles, gabled roofs, dormers, blind dormers, attached garage usually with a gable or a dormer on top, chimneys, blind chimneys, ornamental timber frames or log structures, wooden lintels, flowerbeds, front gardens, decorative door ironworks, decorative mission style lanterns and grilles, prominent eaves and stone-cladded porches, commonly vault-shaped or portico style.

The orthoquartzite is also known in Argentina as Piedra Mar del Plata (Mar del Plata stone), both because its use on the houses of this style and the abundance of sandstone quarries southwest of the city. The orthoquartzite has been proposed for nomination to the Global Heritage Stone Resource.

There is the possibility of a subcategorization depending on the main style upon which the chalet is based. In fact, Alberto Córsico Piccolini used to characterize some of his works as normando simplificado ("simplified Norman") when the basic design of the houses displays some features of the Norman architecture at domestic scale.

The style raised some criticism, mostly because the overlapping of rooms and spaces on a reduced area. This characteristic, however, adds contextual value to the townscape where the chalets are homogeneously grouped, usually semi-detached.

Architect and researcher Javier Sáez describes this type of house as one of "domestic ostentation" of the "home of your dreams". He goes even further by coining the phrase "domestic obscenity". Saéz also notices, rather than a syncretism, a conflict between the bourgeoisie pretense of the facades and the obvious taylorization of the floor plans.

== Preservation ==
The neighborhoods of La Perla, Stella Maris, Playa Grande, Punta Mogotes and Alfar have today the main concentrations of Mar del Plata style houses. These seaside areas attracted many middle-class tourists, particularly La Perla, thus the chalet played the dual role of home in winter and house for rent in the summer season. A survey conducted in the earlier 2020s listed more than 1300 picturesque houses only at Stella Maris and La Perla, more than 700 of them Mar del Plata style strictly speaking. The oldest residences built in Sierra de los Padres, a hilly area 12 miles west of the city, are also Mar del Plata style chalets. Mass tourism since the 1950s, however, put at risk the survival of the traditional picturesque architecture in Mar del Plata, including the chalet marplatense, in favour of condominiums.

There is a municipal agency which provides tax benefits for the owners to secure the maintenance or restoration of the houses and a handbook with preservation guidelines, created by architect Lorena Marina Sánchez. The inadequate preservation of the style has also been perceived as a threat to both the city's identity and its green spaces.

The style gives a distinctiveness to Mar del Plata's urban environment and marks Mar del Plata's transition from a seasonal resort town into a permanent city.

== Gallery ==
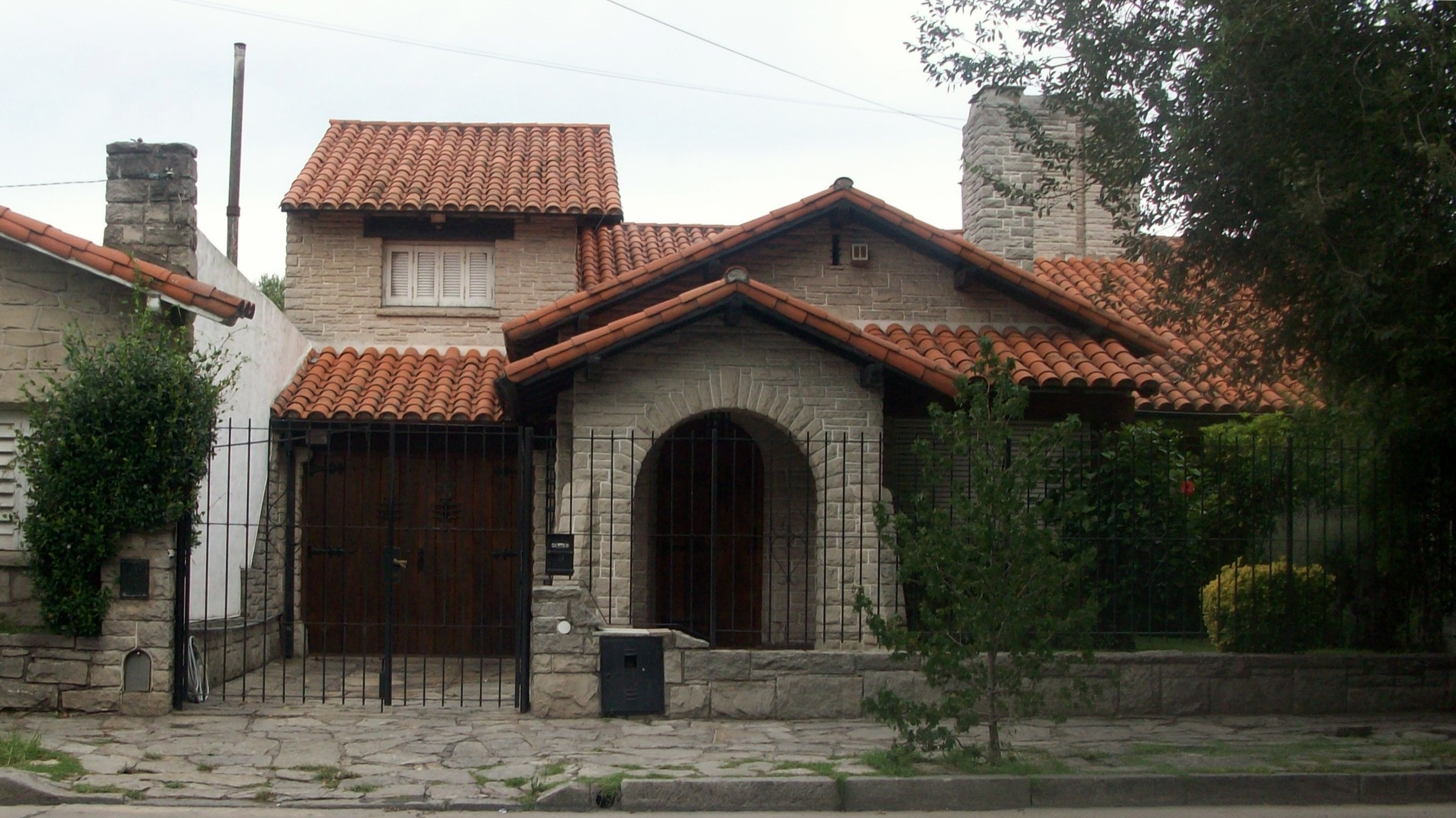
Typical vault-shaped porch on front, false front gable, attached garage with dormer on top and chimney

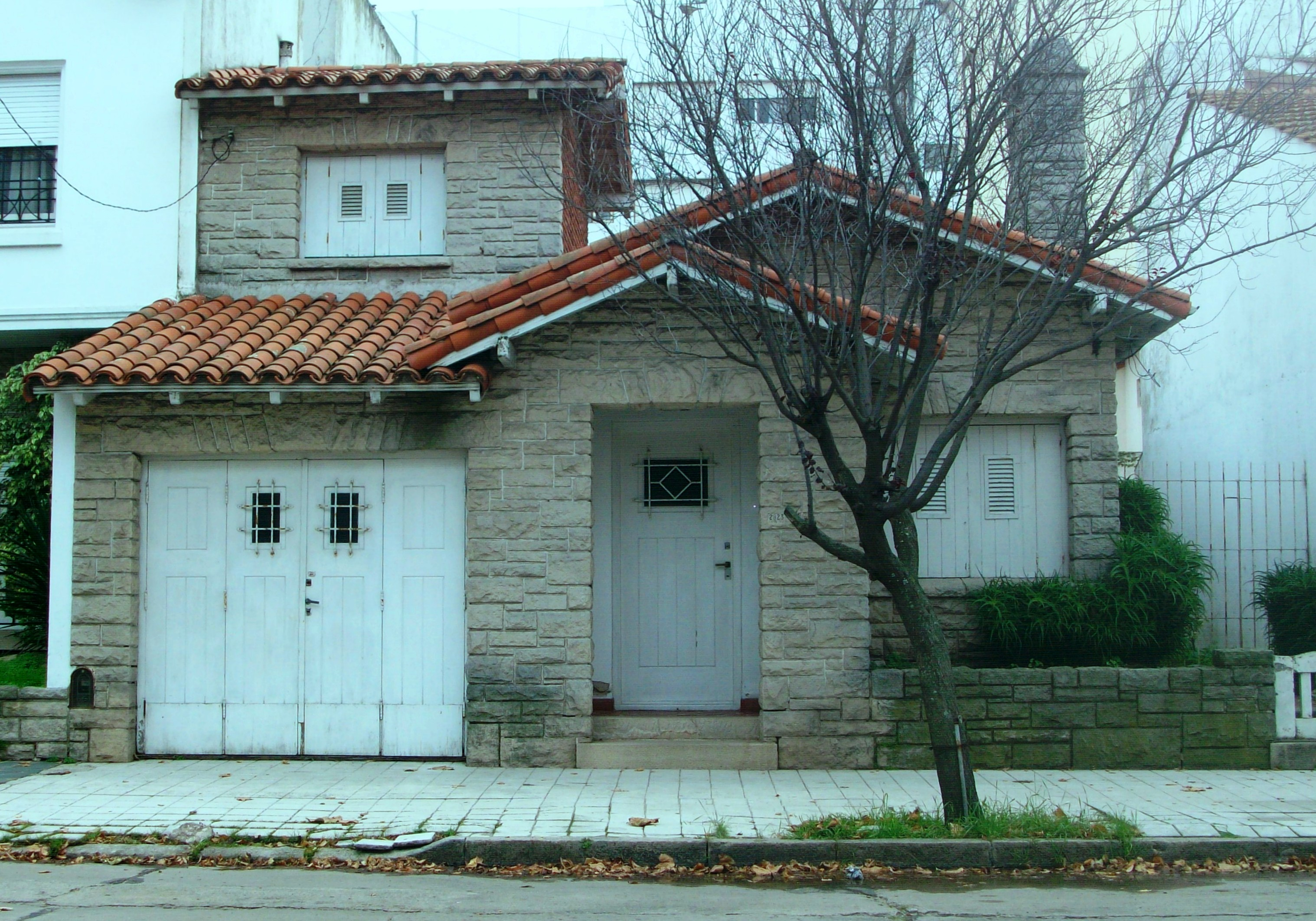
A very similar arrangement showing signs of what Lorena Marina Sánchez describes as ataque orgánico or deterioration by mold fungi

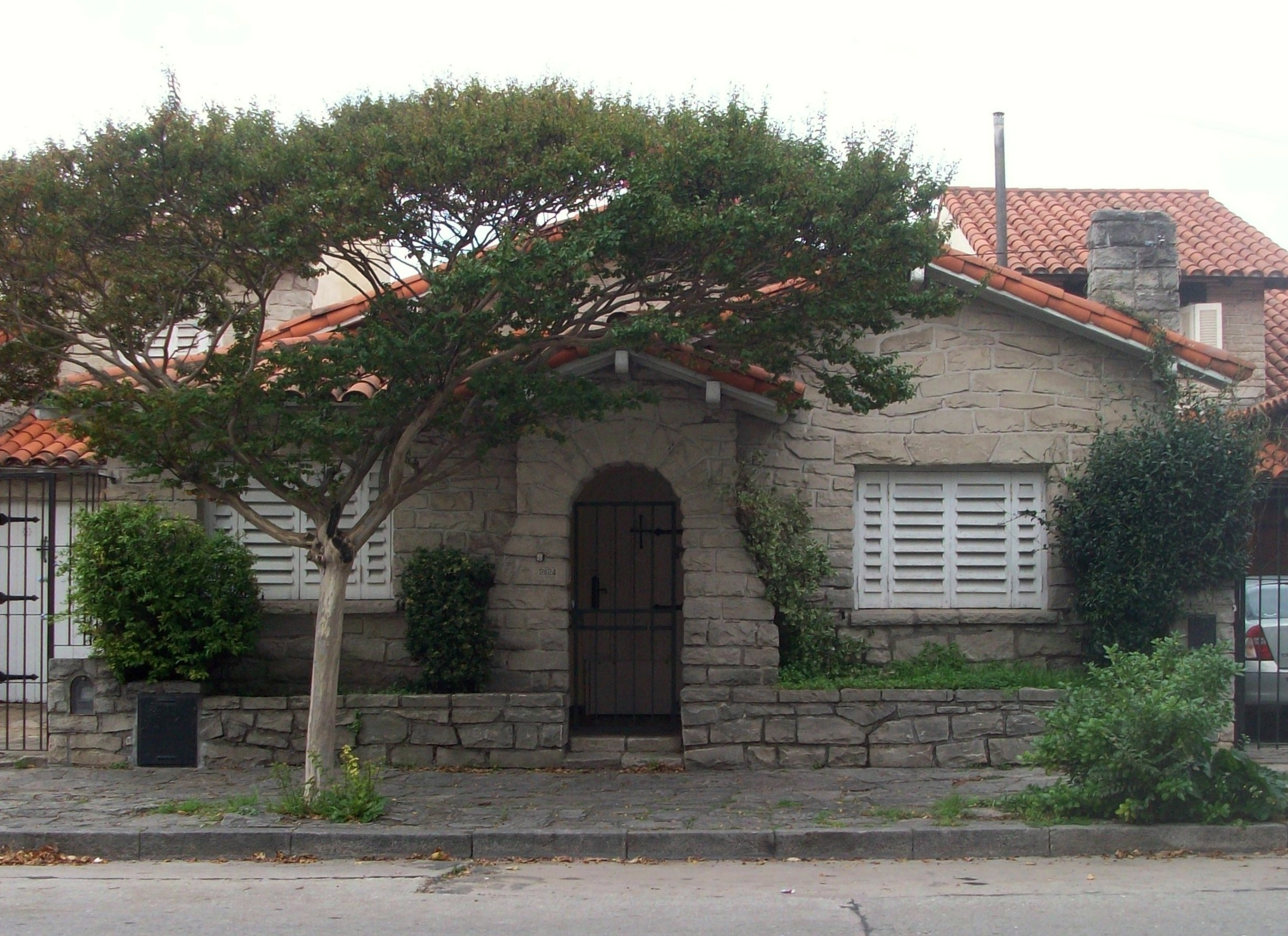
Yet another example featuring a vault-shaped, stone cladded porch on front with false gable hidden by a tree top and false chimney

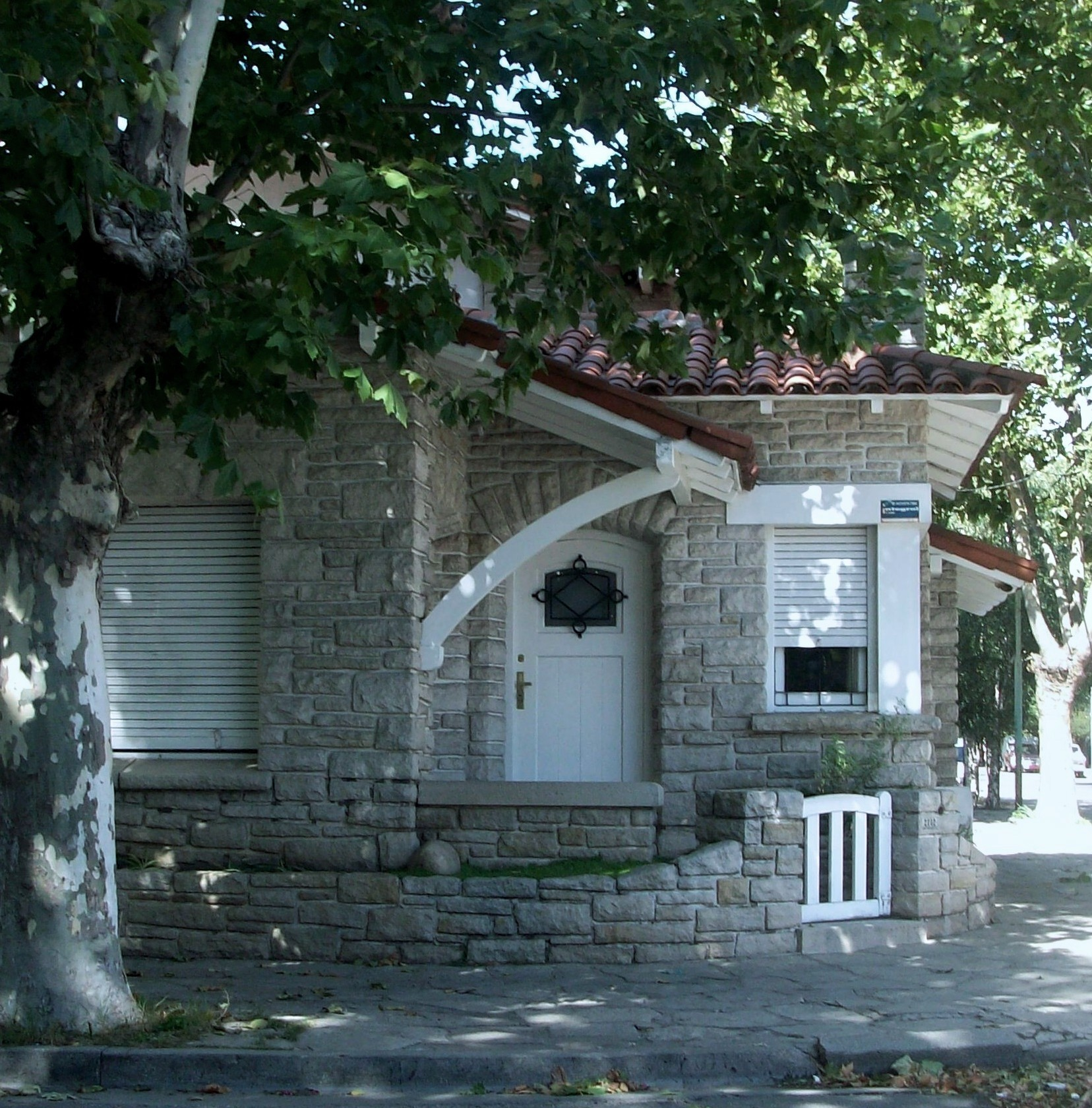
Porch propped up by a stylized wooden beam, windows with wooden lintels and roof ending in prominent eaves

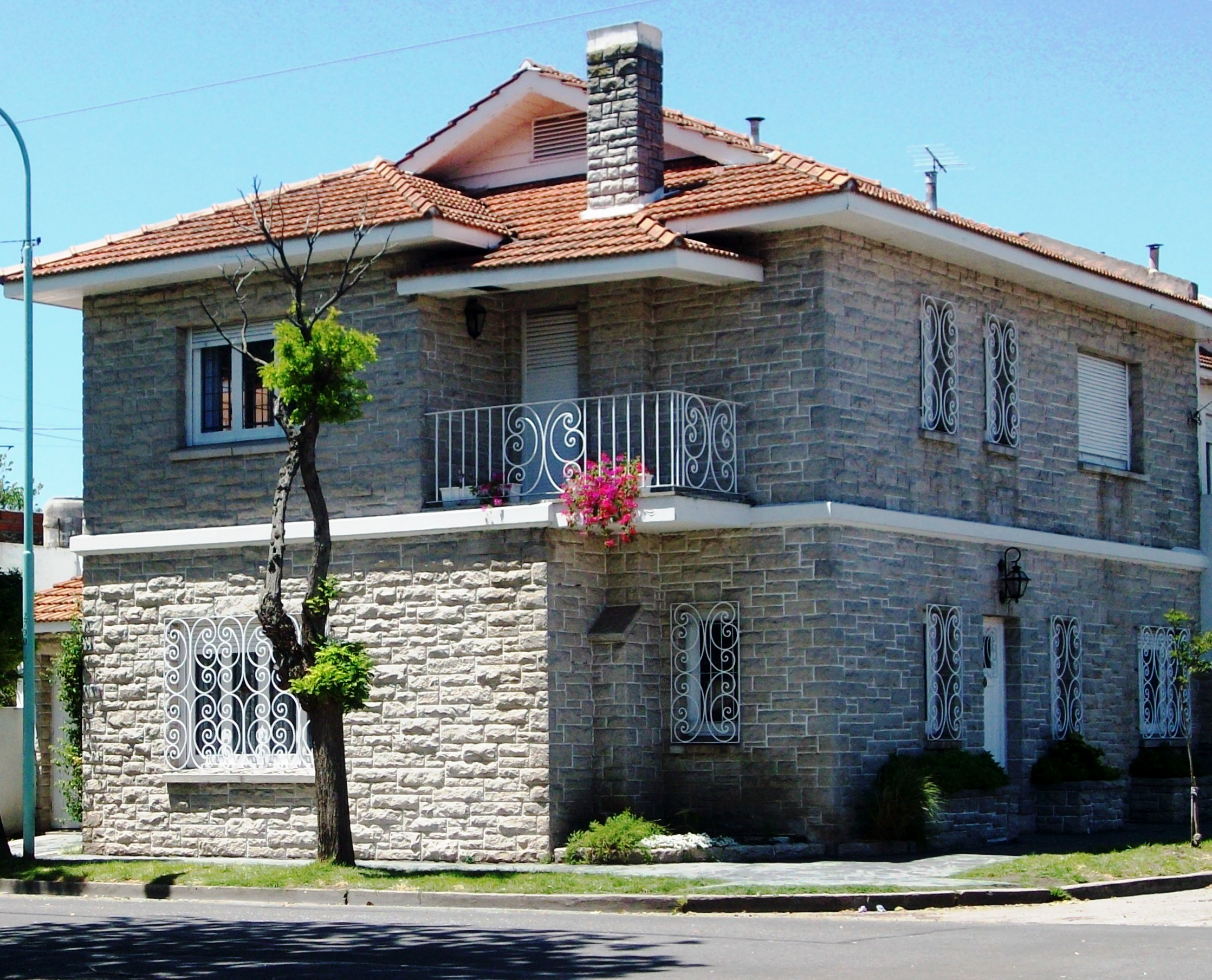
Another two-story chalet with hipped roof and dormer

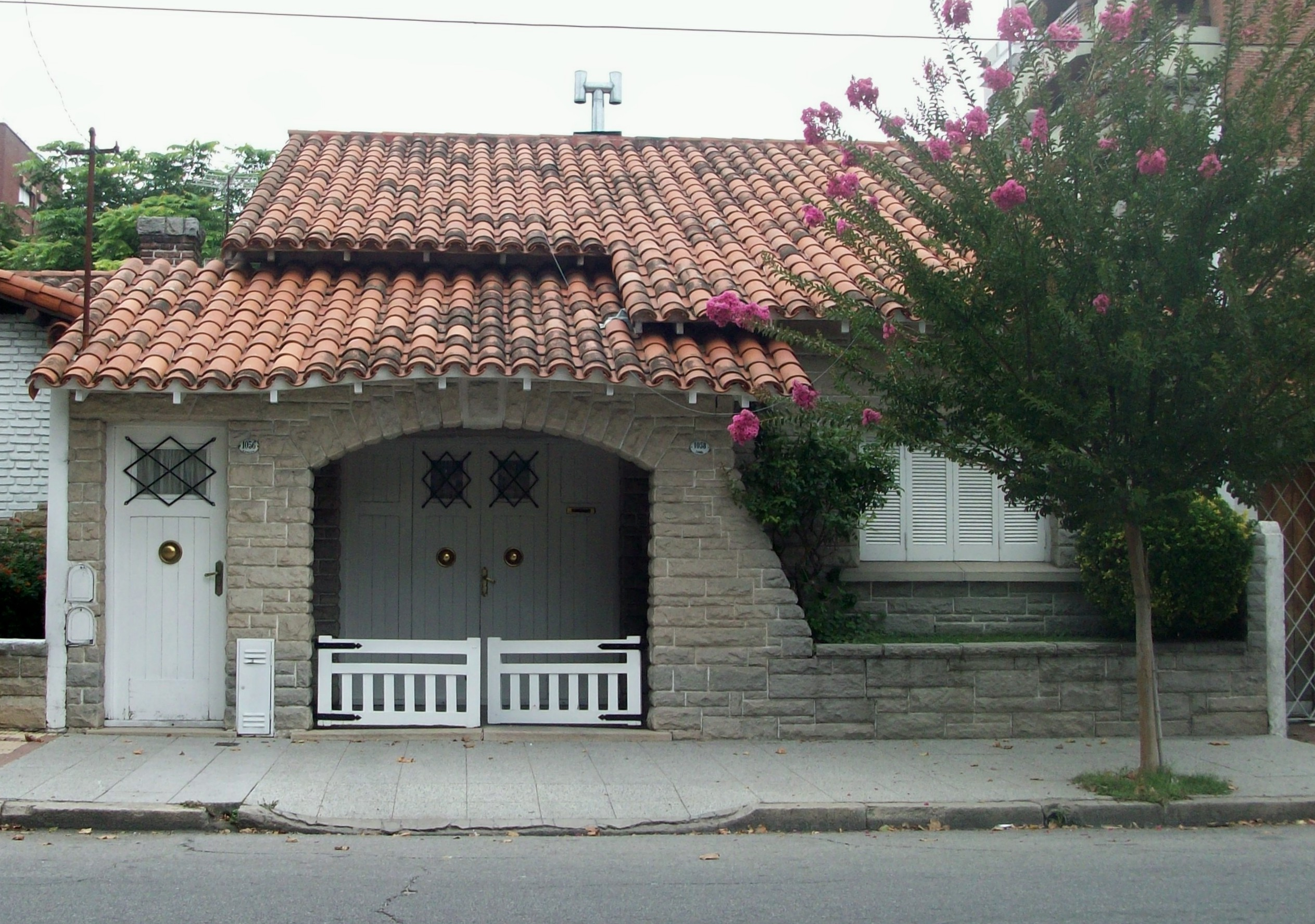
Arch-shaped porch with wooden double gate and a flowerbed at the facade

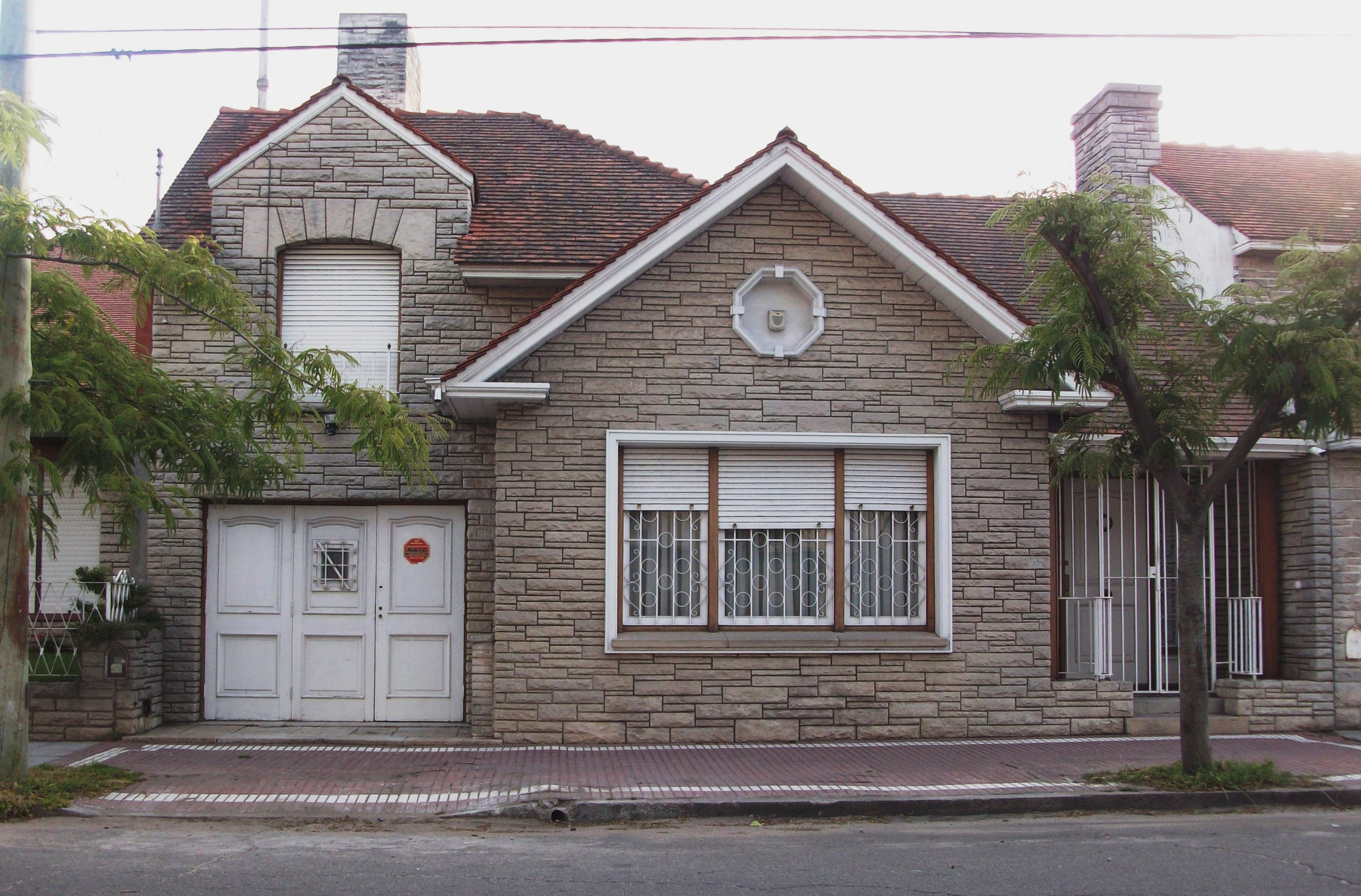
A Mar del Plata style chalet featuring some Norman characteristics (also known in Spanish as normando simplificado)

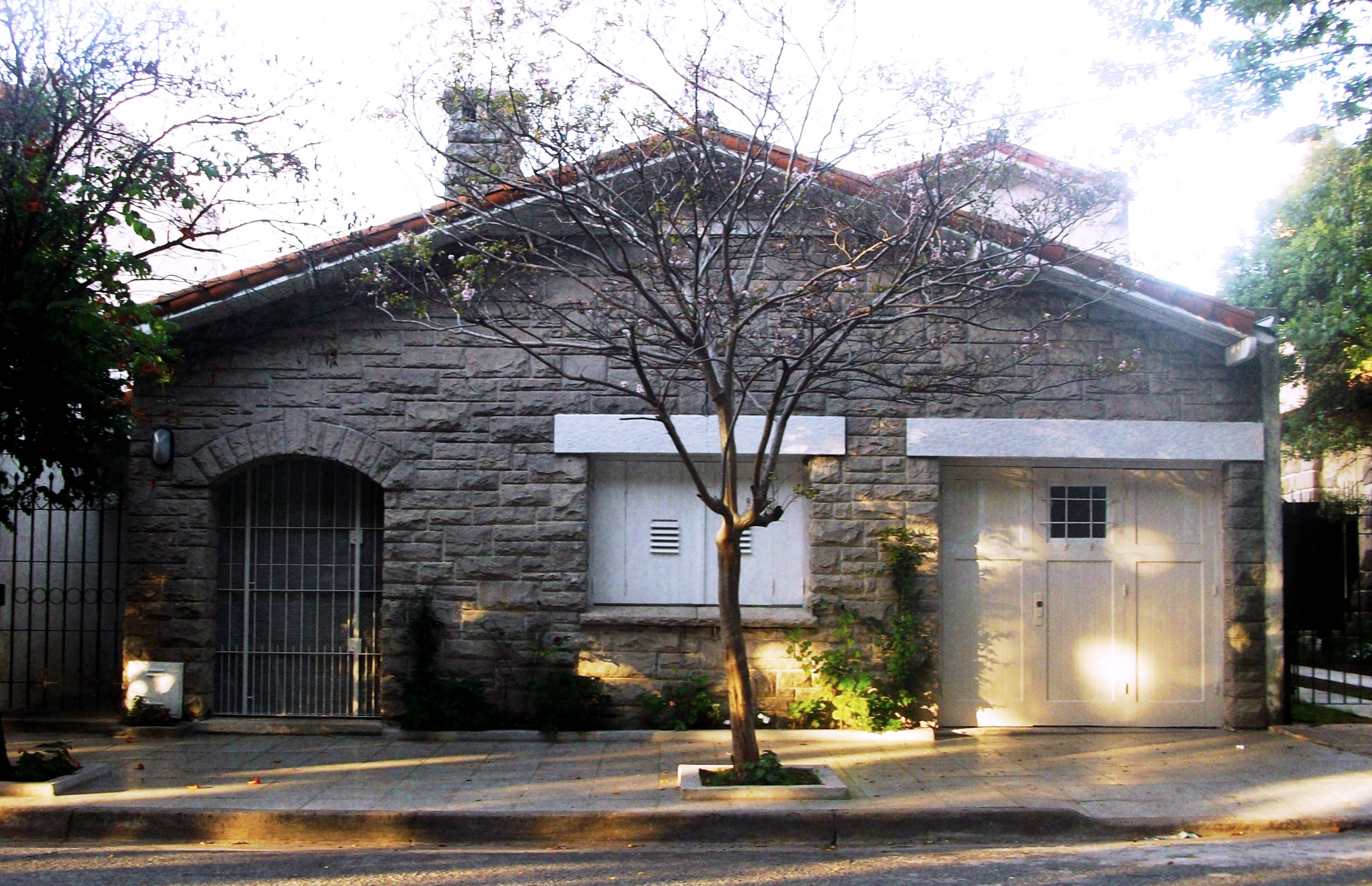
A facade resembling those of the Basque traditional houses, with a two-sided roof

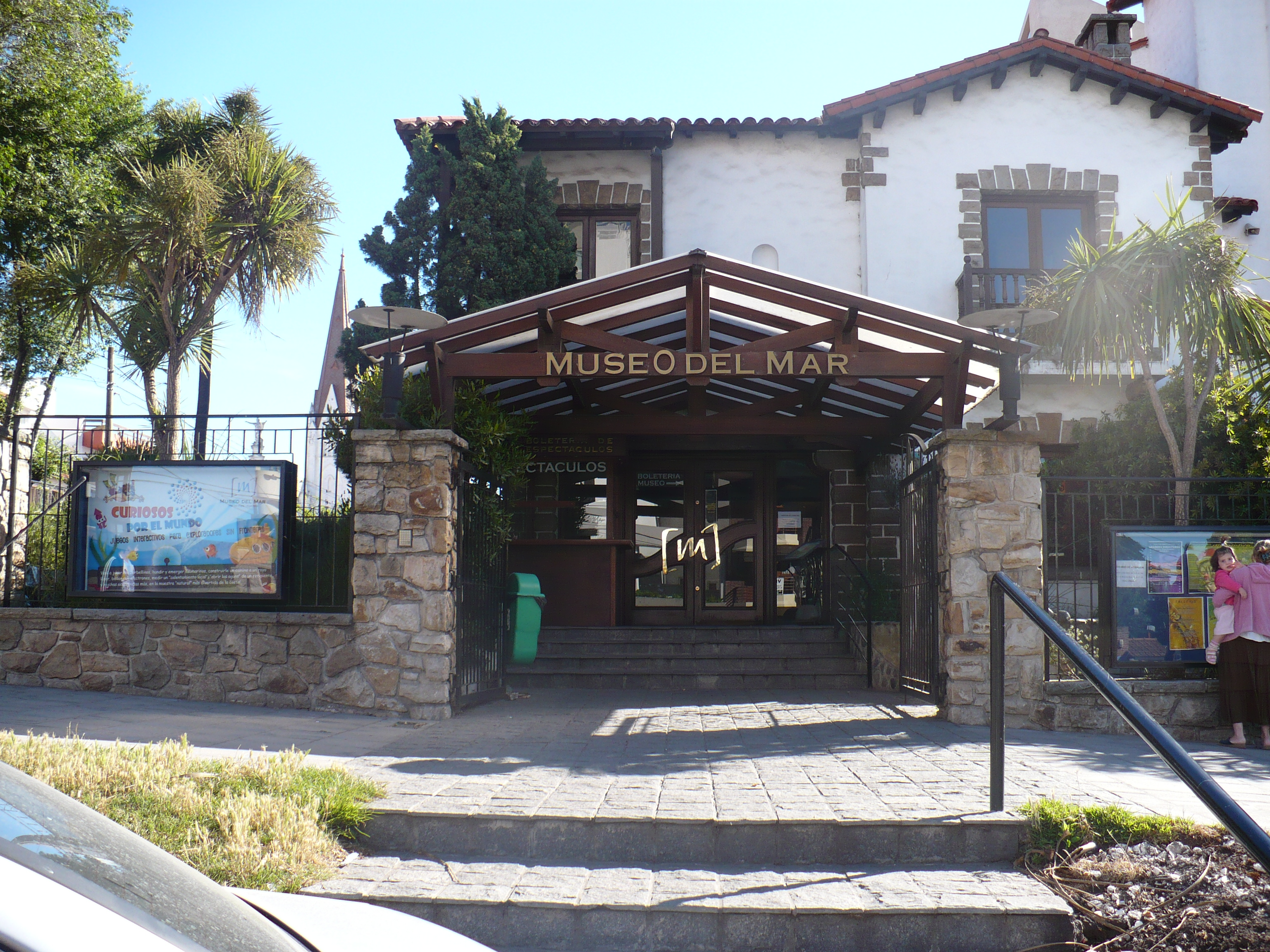
A refurnished chalet, until 2012 home to the Museo del Mar (Museum of the Sea). Owned by Globant company as of 2024

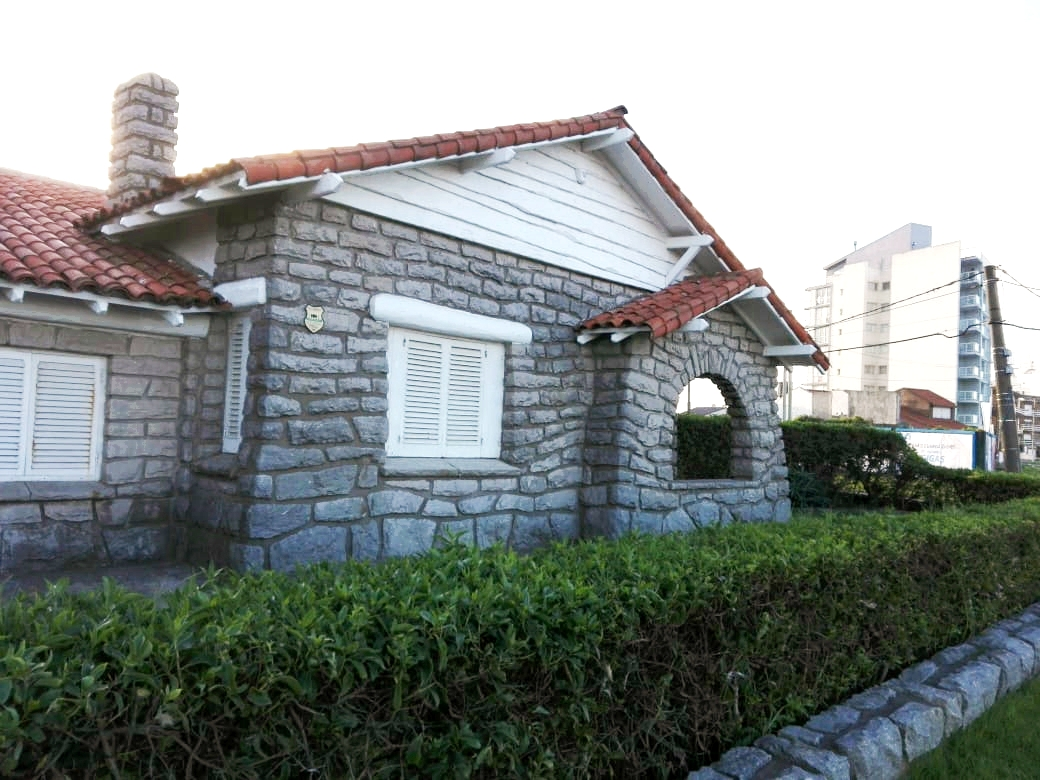
A Mar del Plata style house with an ample, arched porche and a white orthoquartzite facade. One of the few extant on the city's sea front still in original conditions by 2025

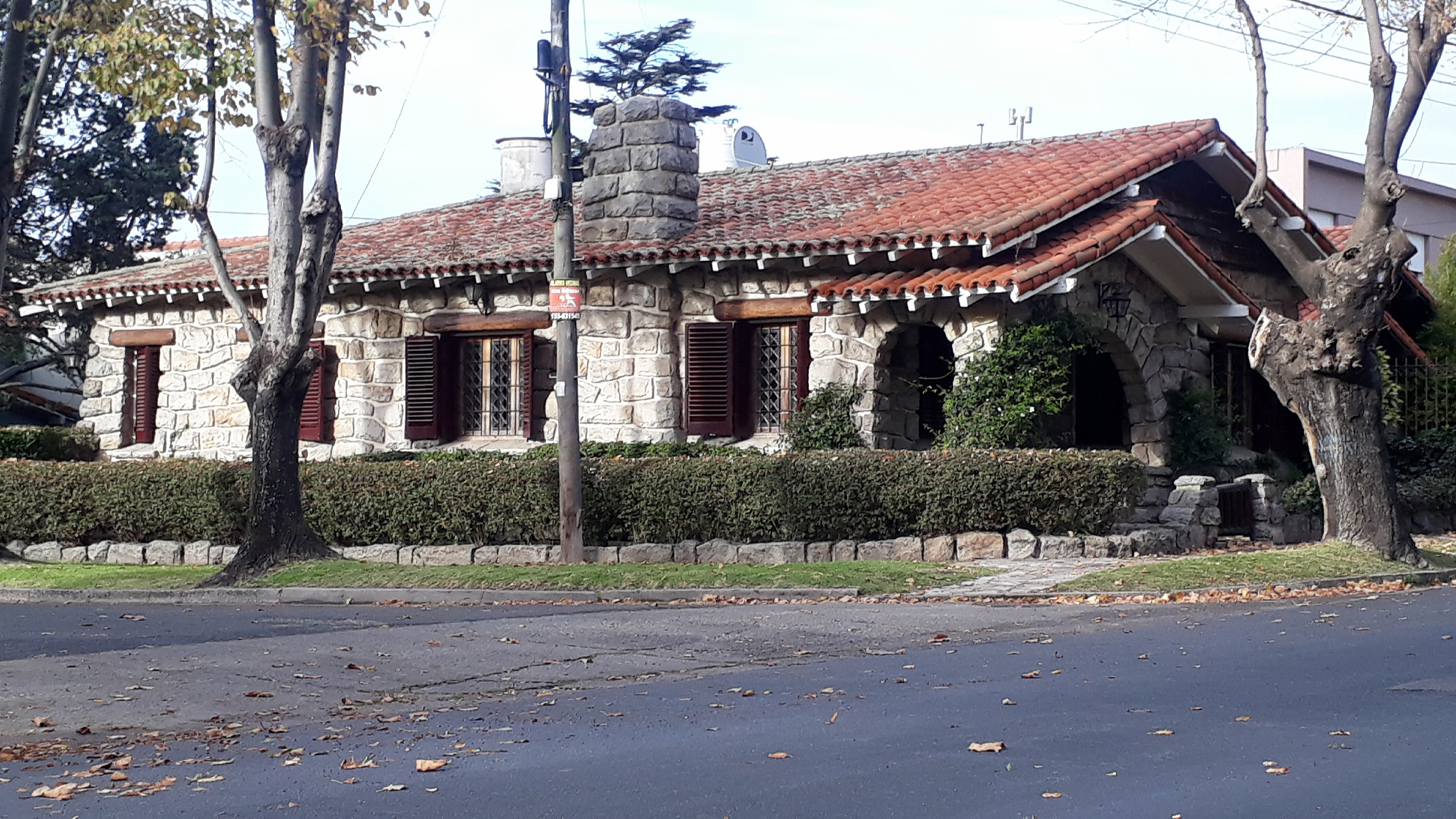
A full stone-cladded chalet with a rectangular, long layout and "embedded" portico-style porch

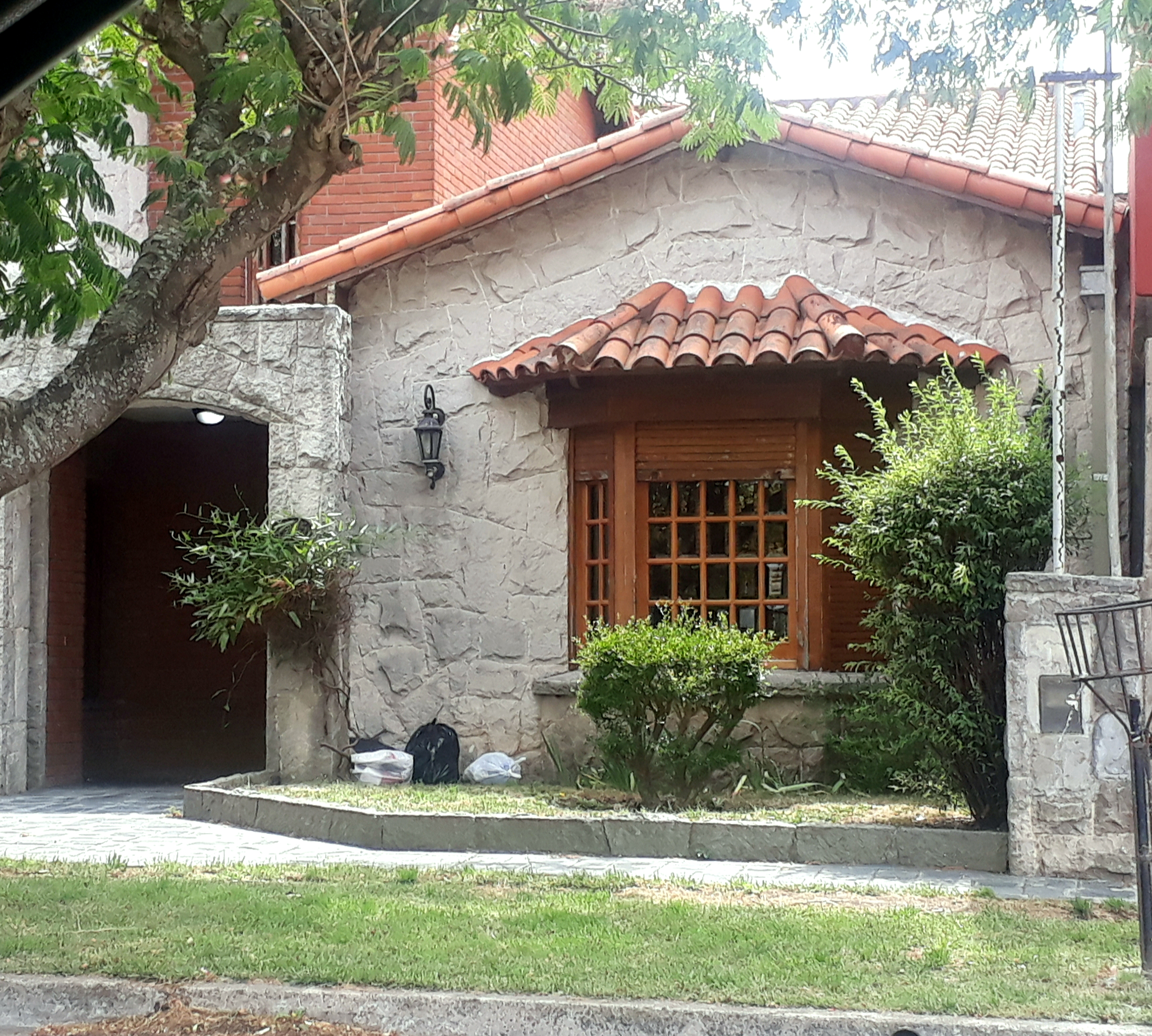
A recently built 'revivalist' Mar del Plata style house in Parque Luro, in the northern outskirts of Mar del Plata

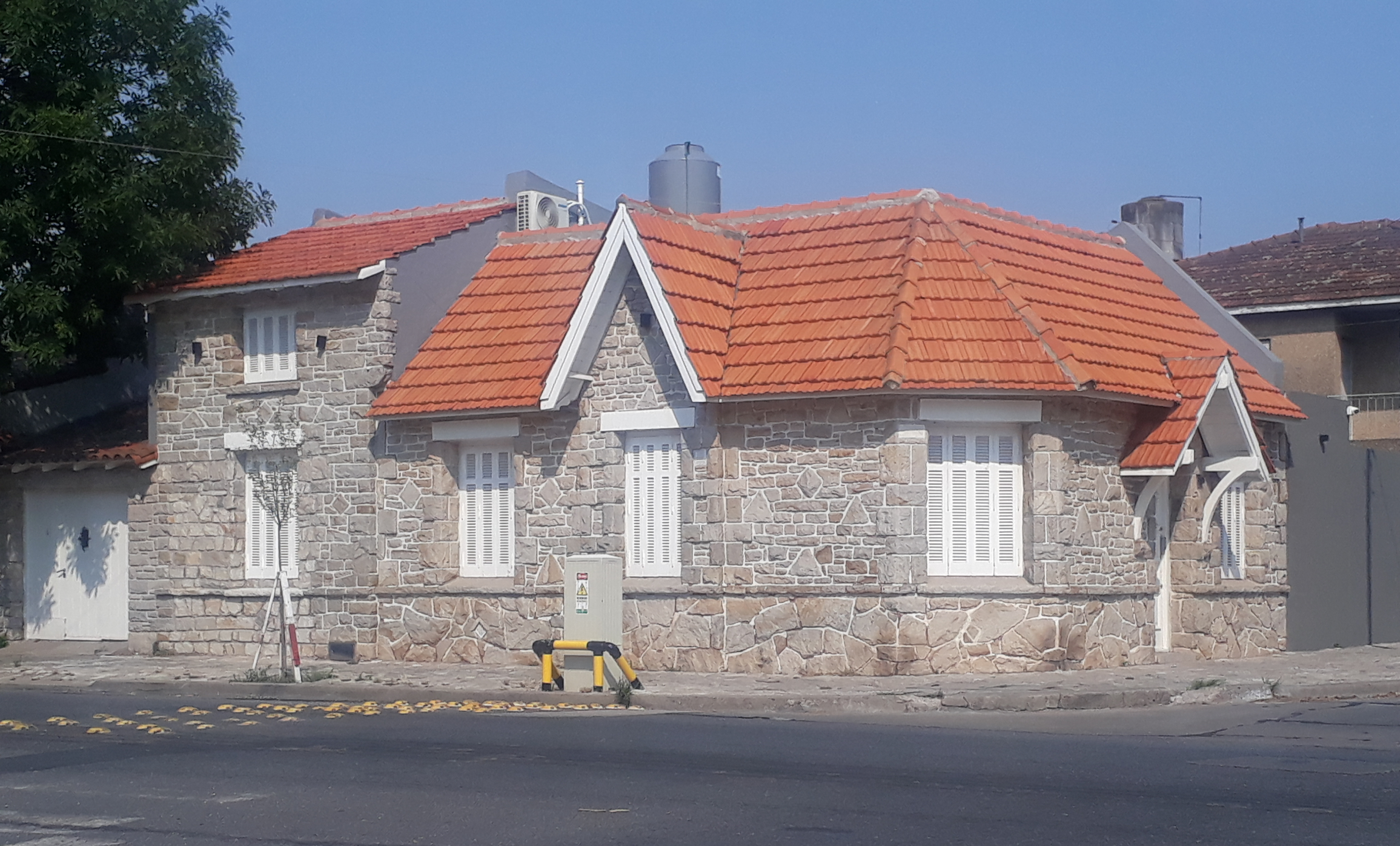
A refurnished early example of Mar del Plata style house

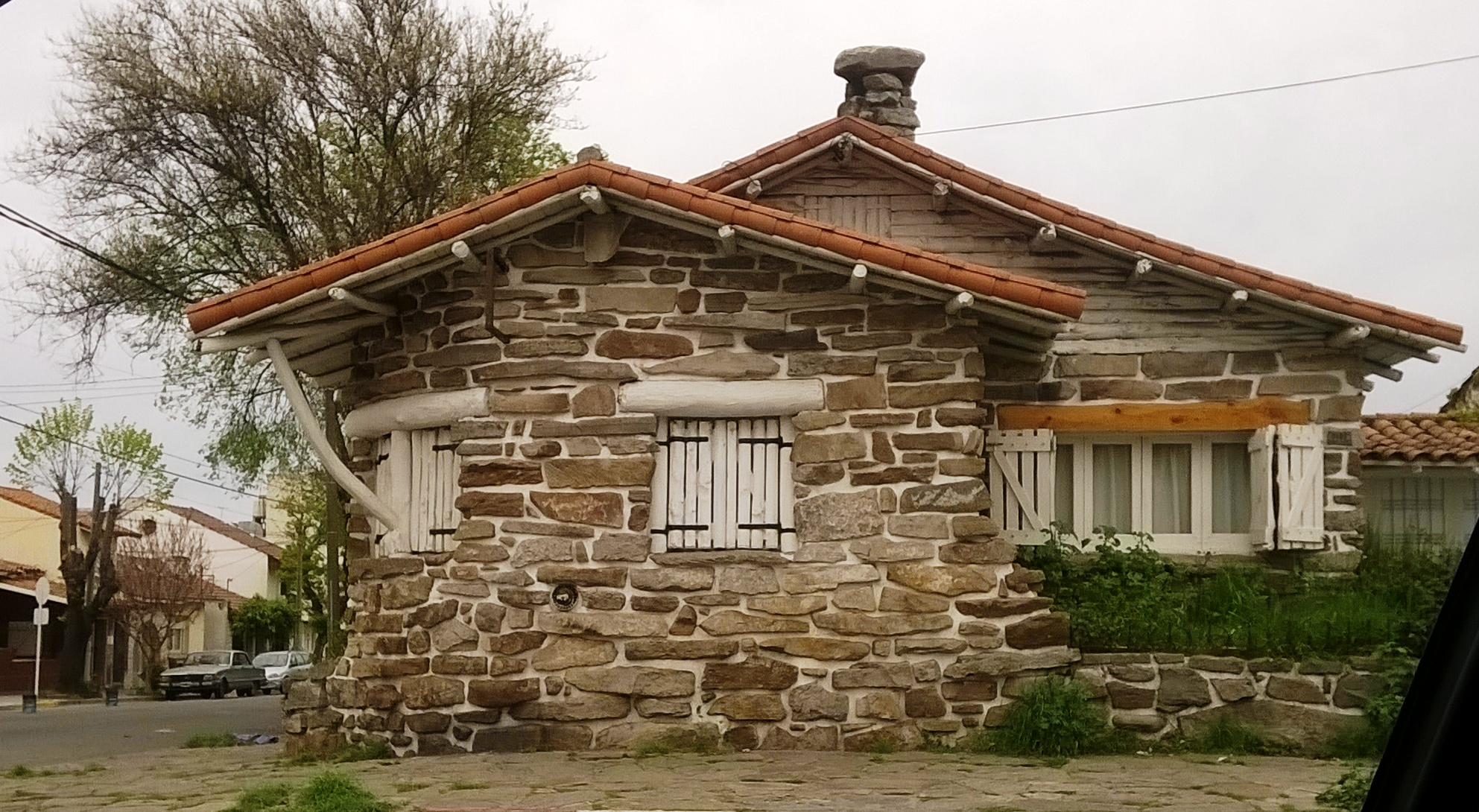
A "rustic" example of Mar del Plata style house

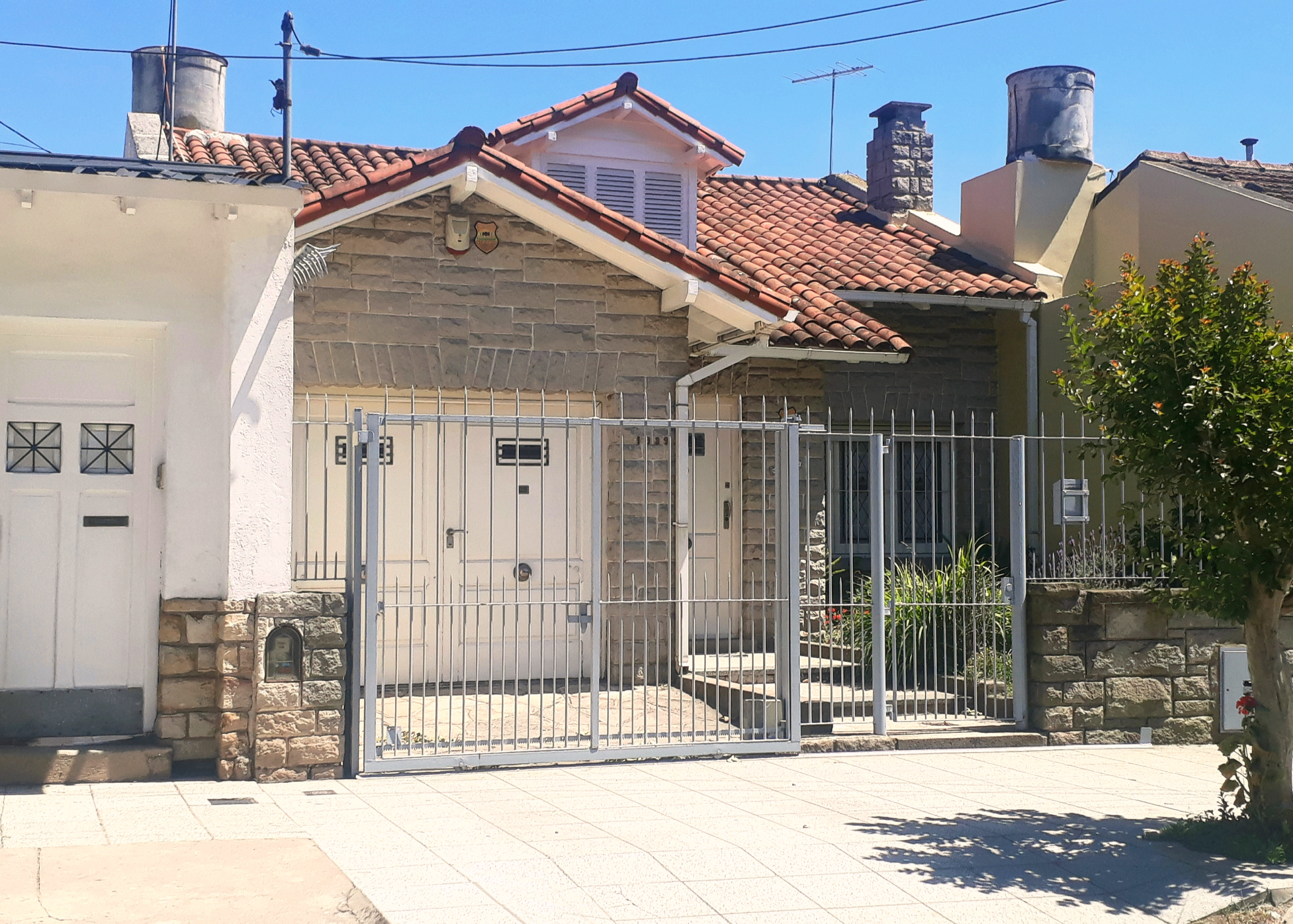
Typical arrangement of attached garage with gable above

== See also ==
- Eclecticism
- Historic preservation
- Mediterranean Revival architecture
- Ranch-style house
- Vacation rental
- Vernacular architecture

== General and cited references ==
- Gómez Crespo, Raúl Arnaldo, Cova, Roberto Osvaldo (1982). Arquitectura marplatense: el pintoresquismo (in Spanish). Editorial del Instituto Argentino de Investigaciones de Historia de la Arquitectura y del Urbanismo.
- Haumont, Nicole (1998). L'urbain dans tous ses états: faire, vivre et dire la ville (in French). Collection Habitat et sociétés, Harmattan. ISBN 2-7384-6434-3.
- Novacovsky, Alejandro; París Benito, Felicidad (2009). Alula Baldassarini, el impulsor de la arquitectura pintoresquista [Alula Baldassarini, the promoter of the picturesque architecture.] (in Spanish). Universidad Nacional de Mar del Plata. ISBN 9789875443457.
- Sáez, Javier A. (1997). La máquina promiscua. El Estilo Mar del Plata y la formación del espacio doméstico entre 1935 y 1950 (in Spanish). Chapter VII "Mar del Plata, Ciudad e Historia". Alianza Editorial. ISBN 950-40-0155-6.
- Sánchez, Lorena Marina: Chaleterapia A preservation guide (in Spanish)
- Sánchez, Lorena Marina (2008). "Patrimonio modesto en movimiento: diálogos urbanos entre historia social e arquitectura" (in Spanish). Vitruvius magazine.
