= List of museums in Argentina =

This is a list of museums in Argentina.

Name	Location	Type	Summary
Academia Nacional del Tango de la República Argentina	Buenos Aires	Dance	History of the tango
Ángel María de Rosa Municipal Museum of Art	Junín	Art	Museum known mostly for abstract art, although it may be perceived as contemporal.
ARA Presidente Sarmiento	Buenos Aires	Maritime	1890s training ship
ARA Uruguay	Buenos Aires	Maritime	1870s Corvette museum ship
Bernardino Rivadavia Natural Sciences Museum	Buenos Aires	Natural history	Dinosaurs, animals, plants, geology
Buque Museo Irigoyen	San Pedro	Maritime	Abnaki-class tugboat deployed in World War II
Buenos Aires Museum of Modern Art	Buenos Aires	Art	Contemporary and modern art
Buenos Aires Toy Museum	Buenos Aires	Toy	website, cultural and social history of Argentina through toys
Caraffa Fine Arts Museum	Córdoba	Art	Paintings and sculptures by renowned local artists
Carlos J. Gradin Museum of Archaeology	Perito Moreno	Archaeology	An Archaeological Museum, named after Carlos J. Gradin. As of 2019, the building is still under construction.
Casa Argentina del Arte Correo	Buenos Aires	Art	Mail art exhibitions and gatherings by national and foreign artists
Casa de Moneda Museum	Buenos Aires	Numismatic	Coins, medals, banknotes, operated by the Argentine mint
Casa Histórica de la Independencia	San Miguel de Tucumán	History	Colonial and independence history of Argentina
Casa Nacional del Bicentenario	Buenos Aires	History	History and culture of Argentina
Casa Rosada	Buenos Aires	Dance	Official executive mansion of Argentina, includes museum about the presidents of Argentina
Centro Cultural Recoleta	Buenos Aires	Art	Cultural arts centre with exhibits
Córdoba Historical Museum	Córdoba	History	City history, culture
Dr. Ángel Gallardo Provincial Natural Sciences Museum	Rosario	Natural history	Animals, plants, minerals, dinosaurs, fossils, anthropology
Dr. Julio Marc Provincial Historical Museum	Rosario	History	Includes archaeological artifacts, Spanish-American art, numismatics, pre-Columbian textile and silverwork crafts, weapons, furniture
Eduardo Sívori Museum	Buenos Aires	Art	Argentinian art
Ernesto de la Cárcova Museum of Reproductions and Comparative Sculpture	Buenos Aires	Art	Replicas of original sculptures from ancient Egypt, Chaldea, Mesopotamia and Greek
Evita Fine Arts Museum	Córdoba	Art	
Firma y Odilo Estévez Municipal Decorative Art Museum	Rosario	Art	Includes European paintings from the 17th to the 19th centuries, ivory objects, Spanish American silver, tapestries, rugs, glassware, porcelain and sculptures
Fortabat Art Collection	Buenos Aires	Art	Collection includes 19th century Argentine landscape, naturalist and naïf art, 20th century Argentine works, international art, Figurative art works
Francisco Moreno Museum of Patagonia	San Carlos de Bariloche	Natural history	Fossils, prehistory, Aboriginal culture and artifacts, regional history, Argentina's national parks
Hotel Castelar	Buenos Aires	History	Hotel with museum room dedicated to Spanish poet and dramatist Federico García Lorca
Hotel de Inmigrantes	Buenos Aires	History	History of immigration to Argentina
Juan B. Ambrosetti Museum of Ethnography	Buenos Aires	Ethnography	Archaeological and cultural artifacts from northwestern Argentina and Patagonia
Juan B. Castagnino Fine Arts Museum	Rosario	Art	European art, Argentine art of the 19th and 20th century, and works by Rosario artists until the 1930s
Juan Carlos Castagnino Municipal Museum of Art	Mar del Plata	Art	Paintings, sculptures, lithographs, photographs and other works
La Plata Museum	La Plata	Natural history	Dinosaurs, fossils, geology, animals, insects, evolution
MALBA: Museo de Arte Latinoamericano de Buenos Aires	Buenos Aires	Art	Latin American art from the onset of the 20th century to the present
Mar del Plata Museum of the Sea	Mar del Plata	Natural history	Features aquarium displays, collections of seashells, exhibits about oceanography
Municipal Museum of the City	Rosario	History	Local history, culture
Museo Carmen Funes	Plaza Huincul	Natural history	Dinosaurs
Museo de Arte Español Enrique Larreta	Buenos Aires	Art	Spanish art including medieval, baroque and Spanish Renaissance art, armor, tapestries, baroque decor, manuscripts, wood carvings, and French furniture
Museo de Arte Hispanoamericano Isaac Fernández Blanco	Buenos Aires	Art	Collection of Spanish and Latin American art particularly of the Cuzco School, including fine and decorative arts
Museo de Arte Popular José Hernandez	Buenos Aires	Art	website, historic and contemporary folk art
Museo de Esculturas Luis Perlotti	Buenos Aires	Art	website, sculpture by Luis Perlotti and others
Museo de los Niños Abasto	Buenos Aires	Children's	website
Museo del Automóvil Club Argentino	Buenos Aires	Automotive	Historic automobiles, history of cars in Argentina
Museo del Bicentenario	Buenos Aires	History	website, history of Argentina from the May Revolution to the present and beyond
Museo del Cine Pablo Ducrós Hicken	Buenos Aires	Cinema	website
Museo Evita	Buenos Aires	History	website, life of Evita Peron
Museum of High Altitude Archaeology	Salta	Archaeology	Collections related to the Capacocha child sacrifice ceremonies, mainly the Children of Llullaillaco mummies
Museo Histórico Sarmiento	Buenos Aires	History	Life of President Domingo Faustino Sarmiento and the Generation of '80
Museo Juan Manuel Fangio	Balcarce	Automotive	Motor racing cars, dedicated to Formula One driver Juan Manuel Fangio
Museo Mitre	Buenos Aires	History	Argentine history and legacy of President Bartolomé Mitre
Museo Nacional de Aeronáutica de Argentina	Buenos Aires	Aerospace	History of aviation and the Argentine Air Force
Museo Nacional de Bellas Artes (Buenos Aires)	Buenos Aires	Art	Collection includes works from the Middle Ages up to the 20th century
Museo Pueyrredon	Acassuso	Multiple	Life of Juan Martín de Pueyrredón and his family
Museum of Contemporary Art of Rosario	Rosario	Art	Contemporary art
Museum of Foreign Debt	Buenos Aires	Economics	History of the 1998–2002 Argentine great depression resulting from borrowing money from abroad
Museum of Memory	Rosario	History	information, Argentina’s history during the military coups that took place between 1976 and 1983
Museum of Paleontology Egidio Feruglio	Trelew	Natural history	Fossils of Patagonia, geology
Museum of Water and Health History	Buenos Aires	Technology	Historic water works building with equipment
National Historical Museum (Argentina)	Buenos Aires	History	History of Argentina, exhibiting objects relating to the May Revolution and the Argentine War of Independence
National Museum of Decorative Arts, Buenos Aires	Buenos Aires	Historic house	Mansion house that includes furniture, painting, sculpture, East Asian decorative art
National Museum of the Cabildo	Buenos Aires	History	Colonial era government building with paintings, tools, furniture and clothing related to the 1810 Revolution
National Naval Museum of Argentina	Tigre	Maritime	website, Museo Naval de la Nación
Paz Palace	Buenos Aires	Military	Weapons, cannons, uniforms, equipment, regalia, banners
Planetario	Buenos Aires	Science	Planetarium with exhibits about space, fossils
Rocsen Museum	Nono, Córdoba	Multiple	Over 18,000 pieces from different collections
Samay Huasi	Chilecito	Multiple	Home of writer, teacher and politician Joaquín V. González, includes art gallery, collection of minerals, animals, plants and native artifacts
San Carlos Convent	San Lorenzo	History	18th century convent by the site of the Battle of San Lorenzo
San Martín National Institute	Buenos Aires	History	Life and legacy of General José de San Martín
Stock Exchange Museum	Rosario	History	information, website, origins of the regional grain market
Tigre Municipal Museum of Fine Art	Tigre	Art	
Timoteo Navarro Museum of Art	San Miguel de Tucumán	Art	
Provincial Museum of Fine Arts "Dr. Pedro E. Martínez"	Paraná	Art	

== See also ==
- List of archives in Argentina
- List of museums by country
