= Architecture of Argentina =

South American history of the built environment

The architecture of Argentina can be said to start at the beginning of the Spanish colonisation, though it was in the 18th century that the cities of the country reached their splendour. Cities like Córdoba, Salta, Mendoza, and also Buenos Aires conserved most their historical Spanish colonial architecture in spite of their urban growth.

== History ==
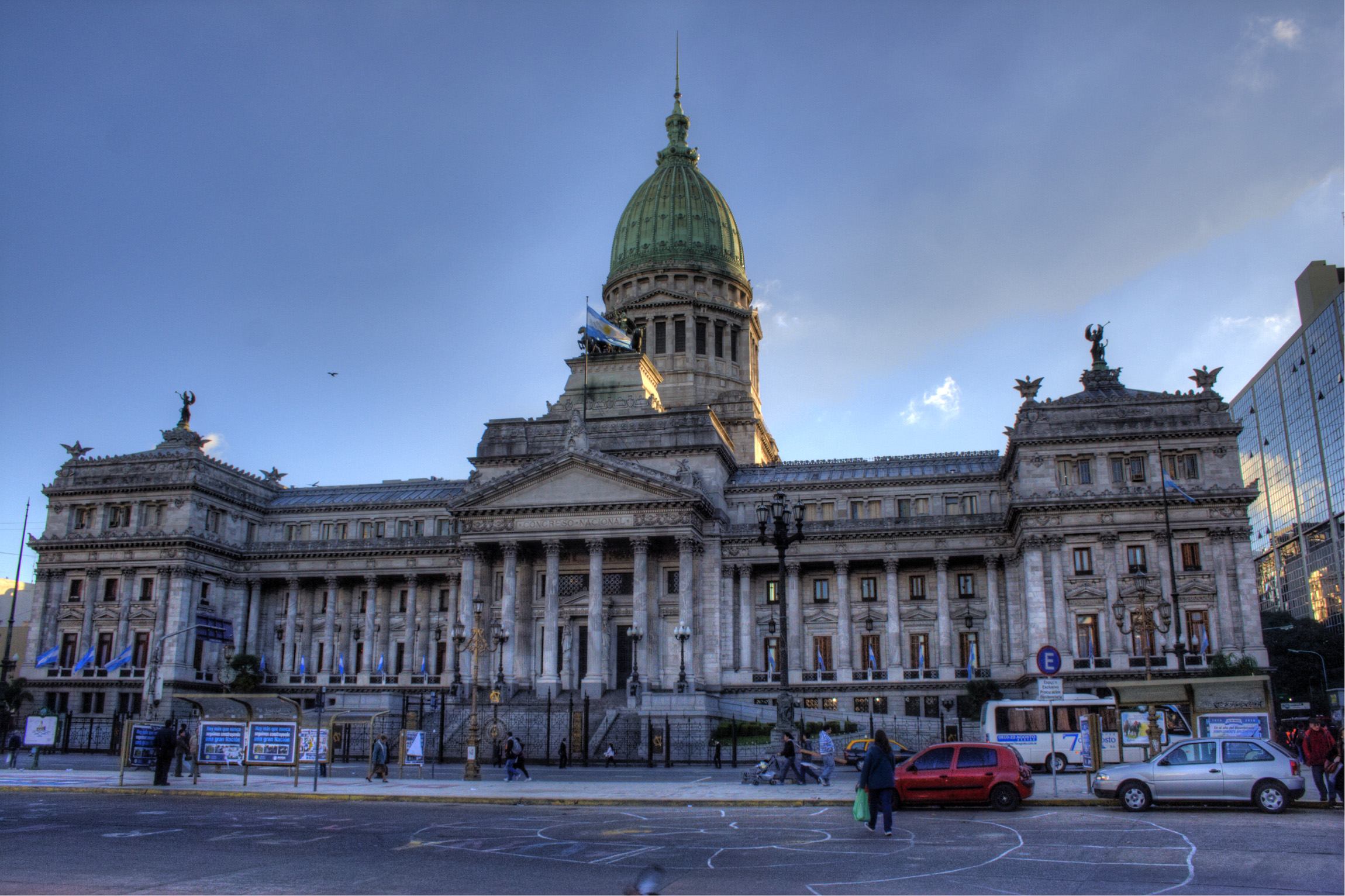
Palace of the Argentine National Congress designed by Victor Meano.

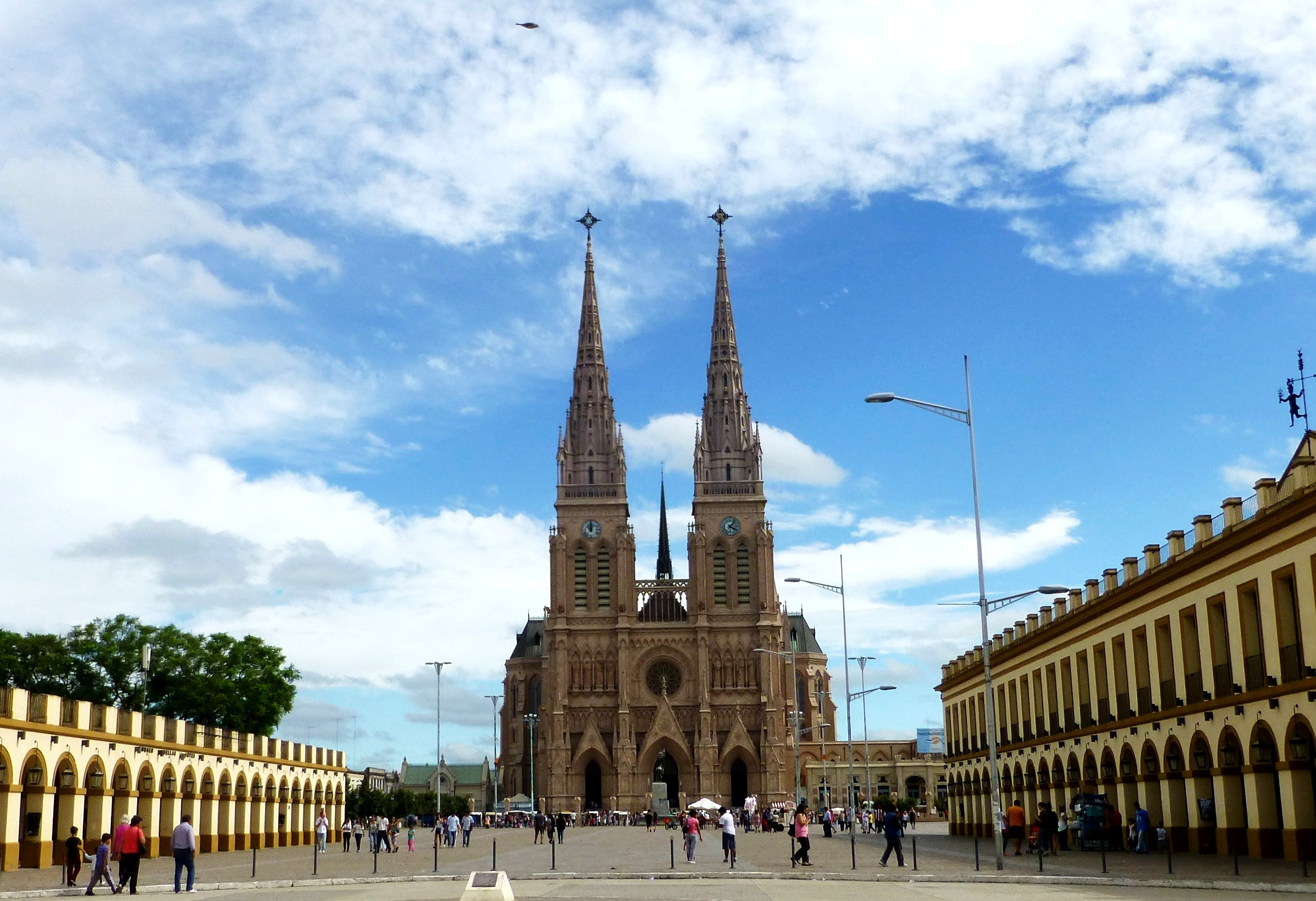
The Basilica of Our Lady of Luján of neo-Gothic architecture.

The simplicity of the Rioplatense Baroque style can be clearly appreciated in Buenos Aires, in the works of Italian architects such as André Blanqui and Antonio Masella, in the churches of San Ignacio, Nuestra Señora del Pilar, the Cathedral and the Cabildo.

Italian and French influences increased after the wars for independence at the beginning of the 19th century, though the academic style persisted until the first decades of the 20th century. Attempts at renovation took place during the second half of the 19th century and beginning of the 20th, when the European tendencies penetrated into the country, reflected in numerous important buildings of Buenos Aires, such as the Santa Felicitas Church by Ernesto Bunge; the Central Post Office the Palace of Justice, by Norbert Maillart; the National Congress by Vittorio Meano and the Colón Opera House, by Francesco Tamburini and hundreds more, including churches, mansions or palaces, schools, theaters and government buildings.

A number of young Italian architects, including Virginio Colombo, Francisco Gianotti and Mario Palanti who designed the Italian pavilion for the Exposición Internacional del Centenario (1910), went on to establish successful careers in Buenos Aires working in a number of styles, including Art Nouveau. Their buildings were some of the most important of the 20th century in Buenos Aires and those that remain continue to play a significant role in defining the city's architectural landscape.

The architecture of the second half of the 20th century continued adapting French neoclassical architecture, such as the headquarters of the National Bank of Argentina and the NH Gran Hotel Provincial, built by Alejandro Bustillo, and the Museo de Arte Hispano Fernández Blanco, by Martín Noel.

However, after the early 1930s, the influence of Rationalist architecture and of Le Corbusier became dominant among local architects, among whom Alberto Prebisch and Amancio Williams stand out in this new vein. The construction of skyscrapers proliferated in Buenos Aires after 1950, though a new generation started rejecting their "brutality," and tried to find an architectonic identity.

This search for identity is reflected in the Banco de Londres building finished in 1967 by Clorindo Testa with Diego Peralta Ramos, Alfredo Agostini, and Santiago Sánchez Elía. In the following decades, the new generations of architects incorporate, as always, European vanguardist styles, and new techniques.

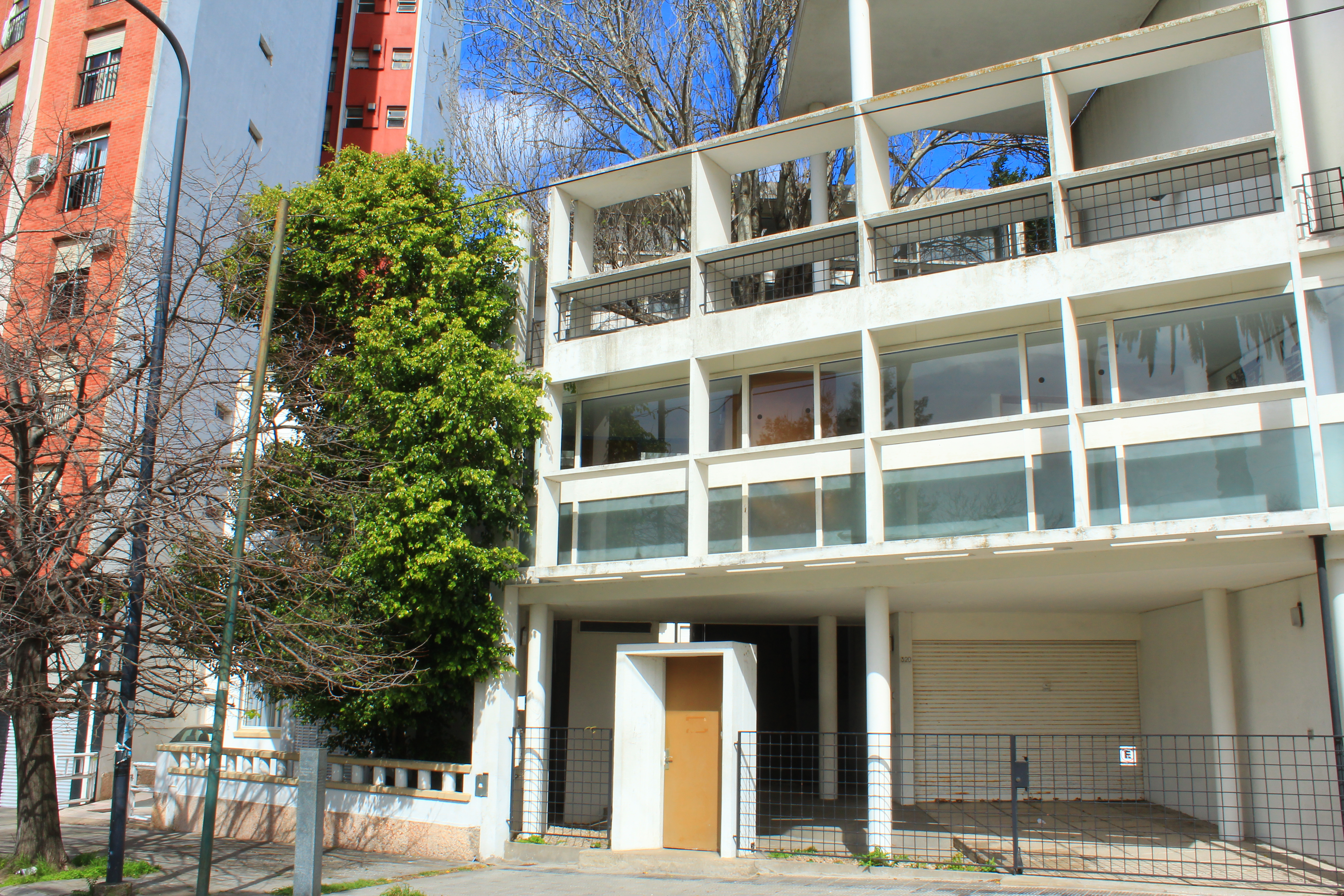
Curutchet House, World Heritage Site in La Plata

Since the latter part of the 20th century, Argentine architects have become more prominent in the design of prime real estate projects in the country, such as the Le Parc tower and Torre Aqualina, by Mario Roberto Álvarez, and the Torre Fortabat by Sánchez Elía, as well as around the world, most notably the Norwest Center and the Petronas Towers, both by César Pelli.

Argentine neighborhoods are characterized by highly independent designs for each building. Most houses have individual designs. Tract housing is near to non-existent, generally reserved for subsidized houses made by the state for the poorest.

== See also ==
- List of tallest buildings in Argentina
- Kavanagh Building
- Mar del Plata style
- Casa Argentina del Arte Correo

== Gallery ==
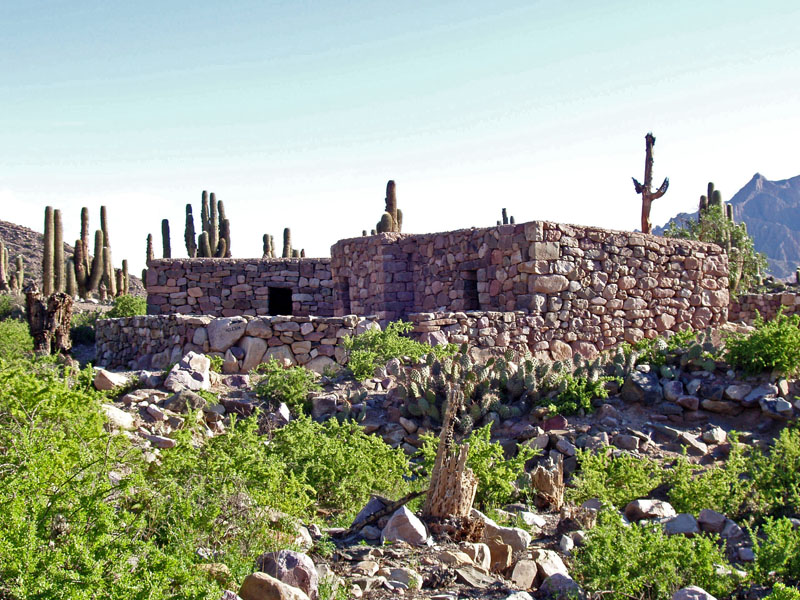
The pre-Inca fortification Pucará de Tilcara, Jujuy Province

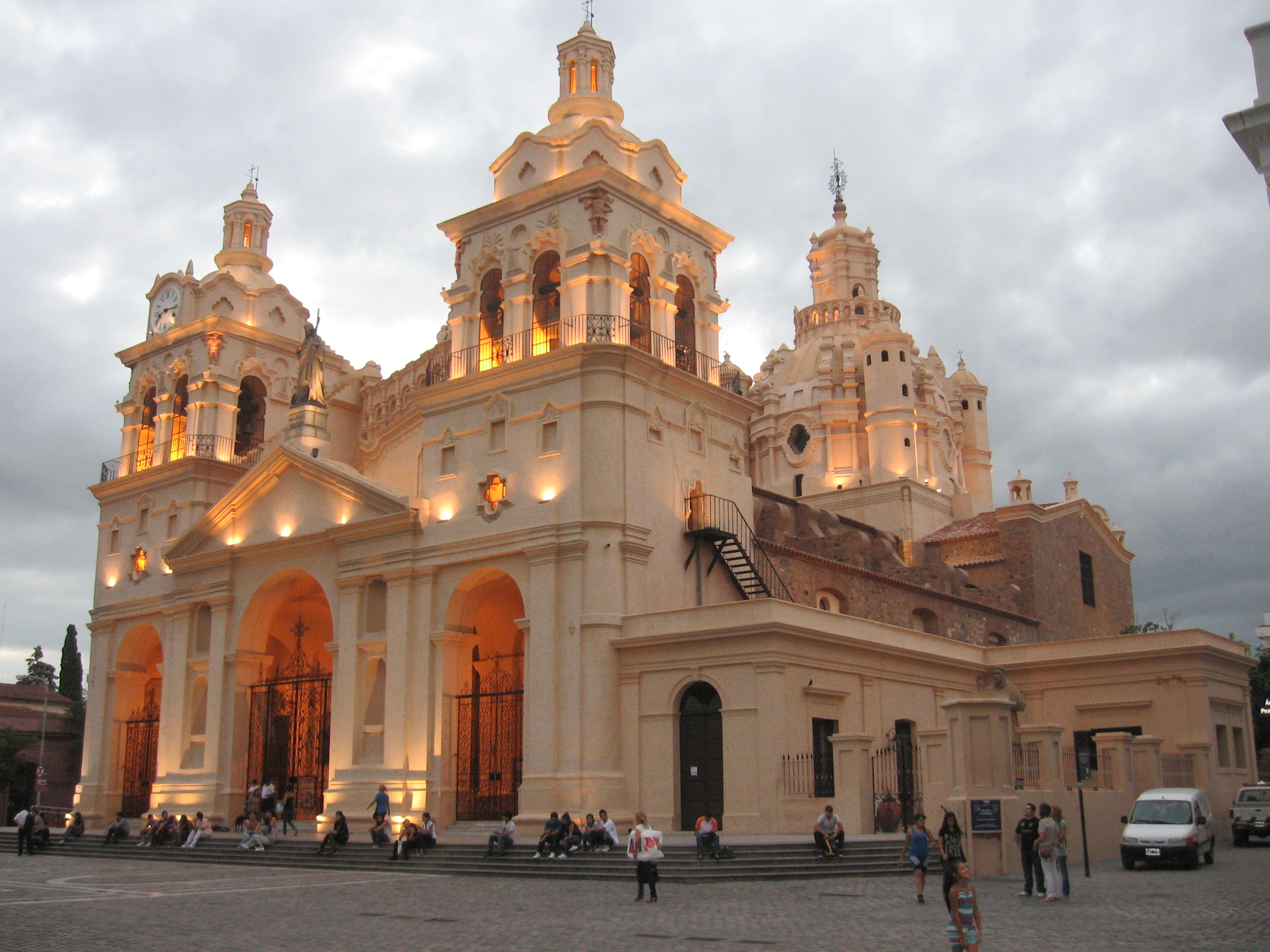
Spanish Colonial architecture in the Cathedral of Córdoba

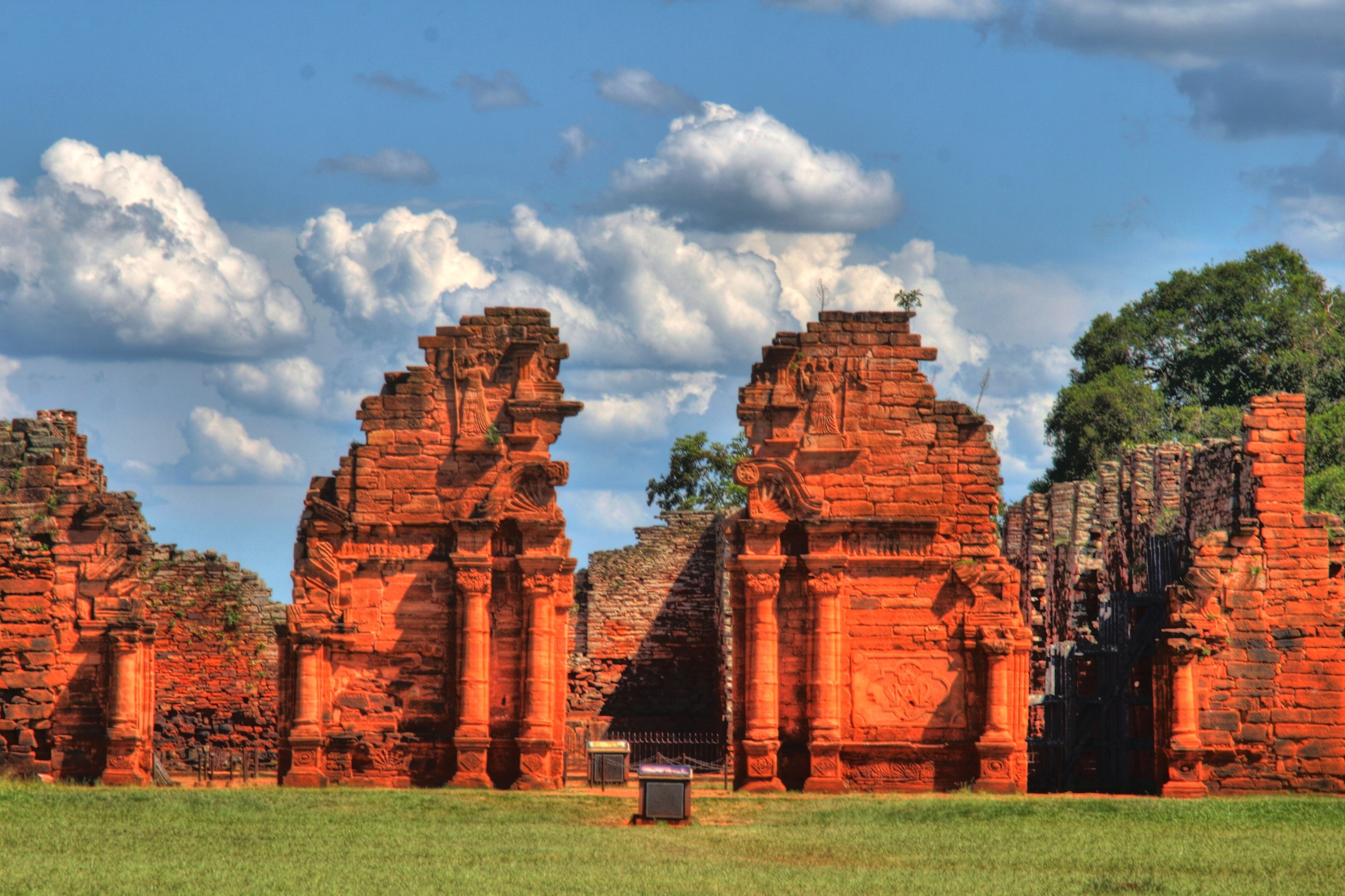
Baroque style church of San Ignacio Miní, Misiones Province

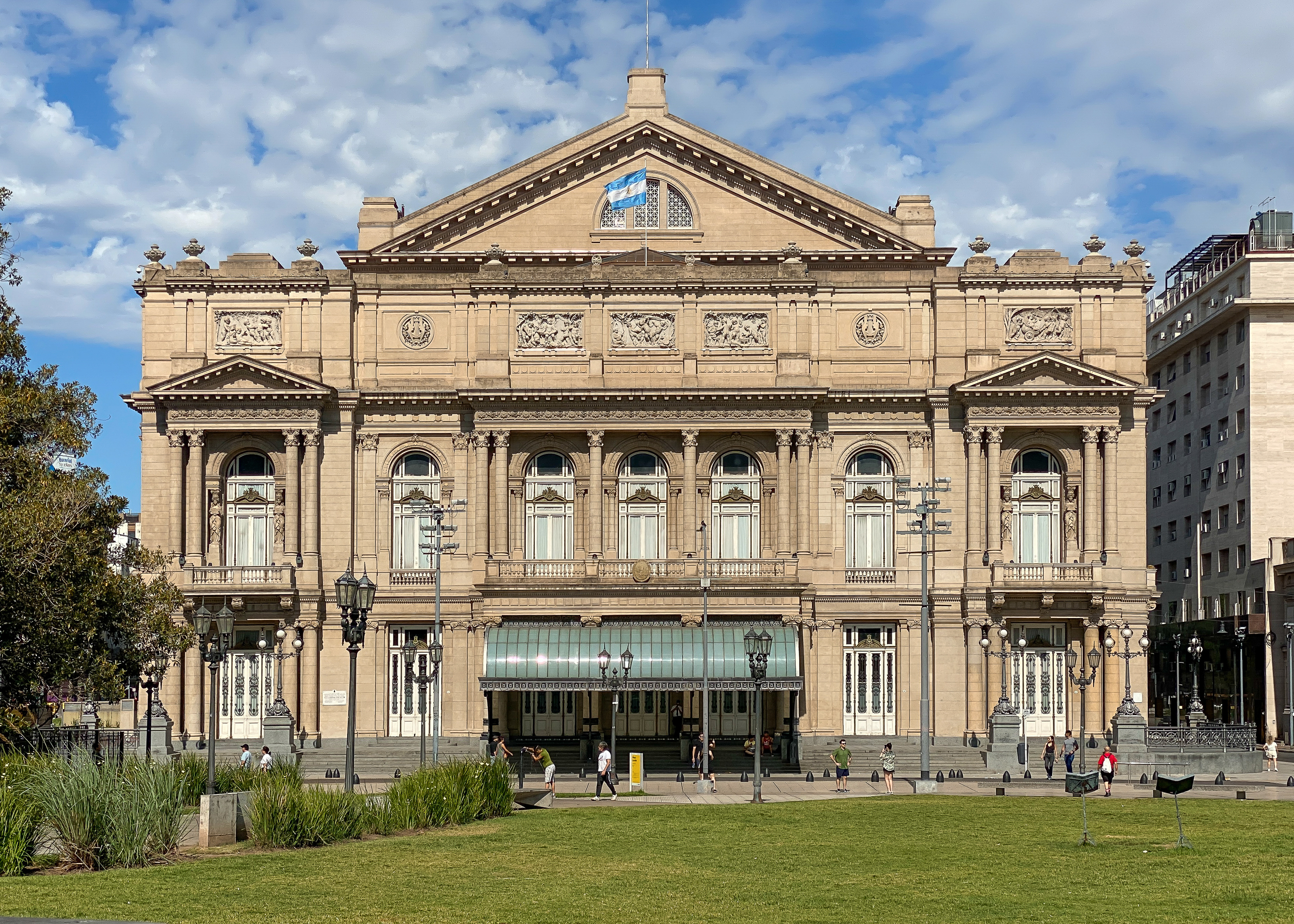
Neo-Renaissance in the Colón Theatre, Buenos Aires

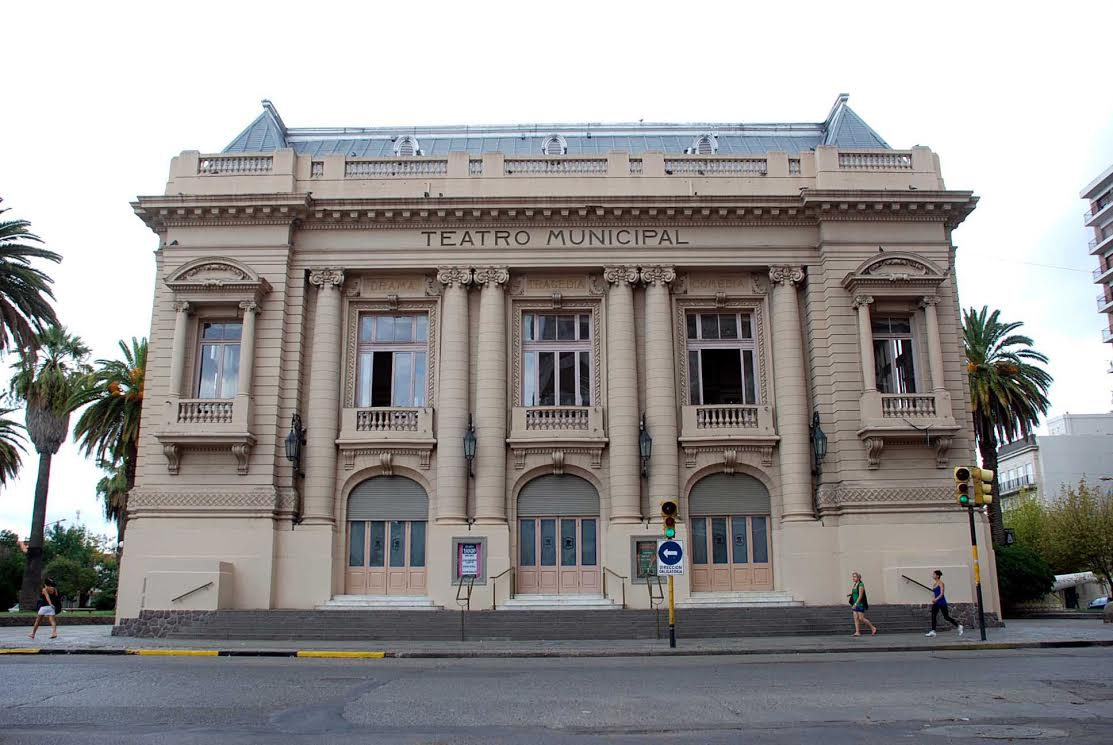
Neoclassical in the Municipal Theatre, Bahía Blanca

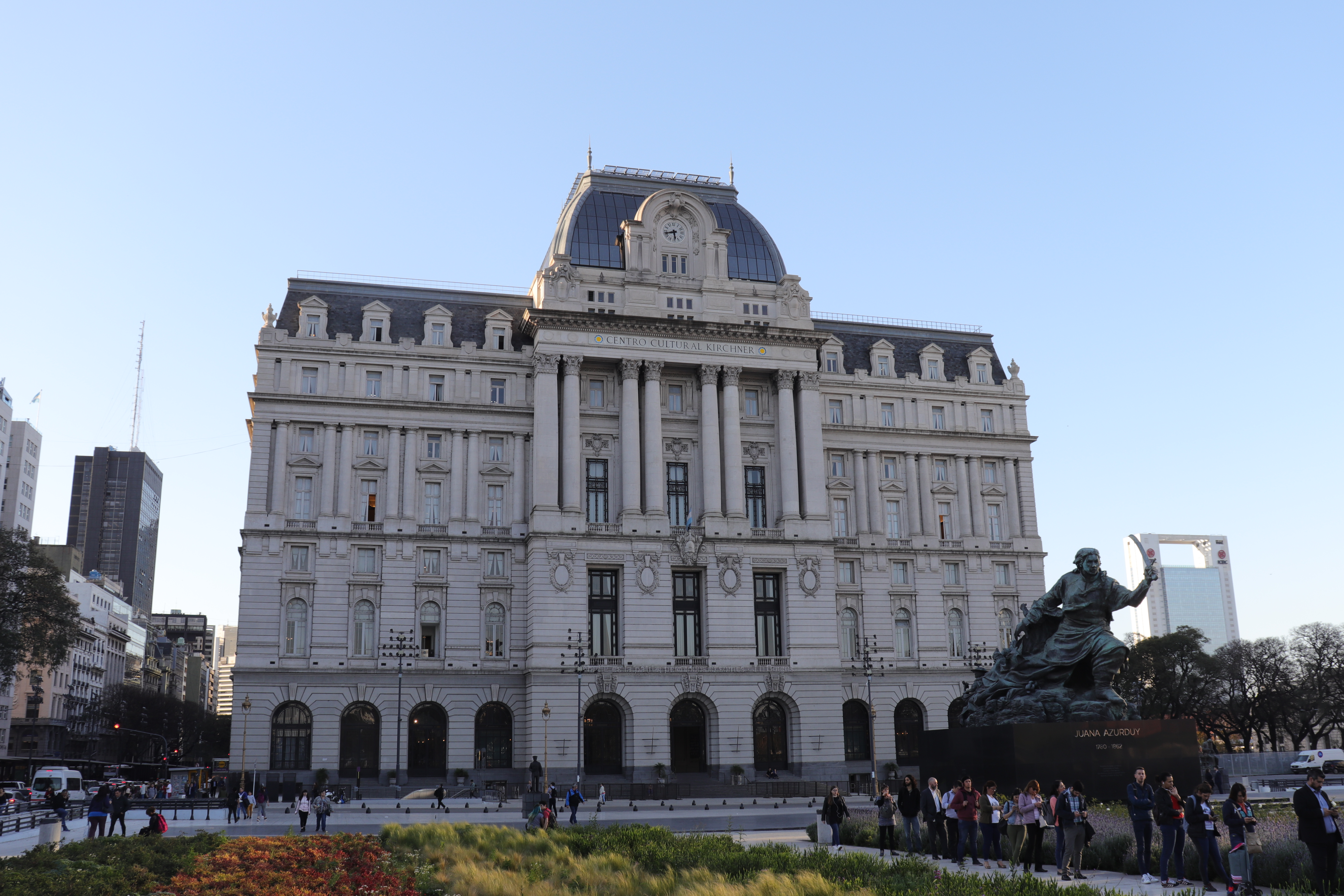
Beaux-Arts in the Libertad Palace, Buenos Aires

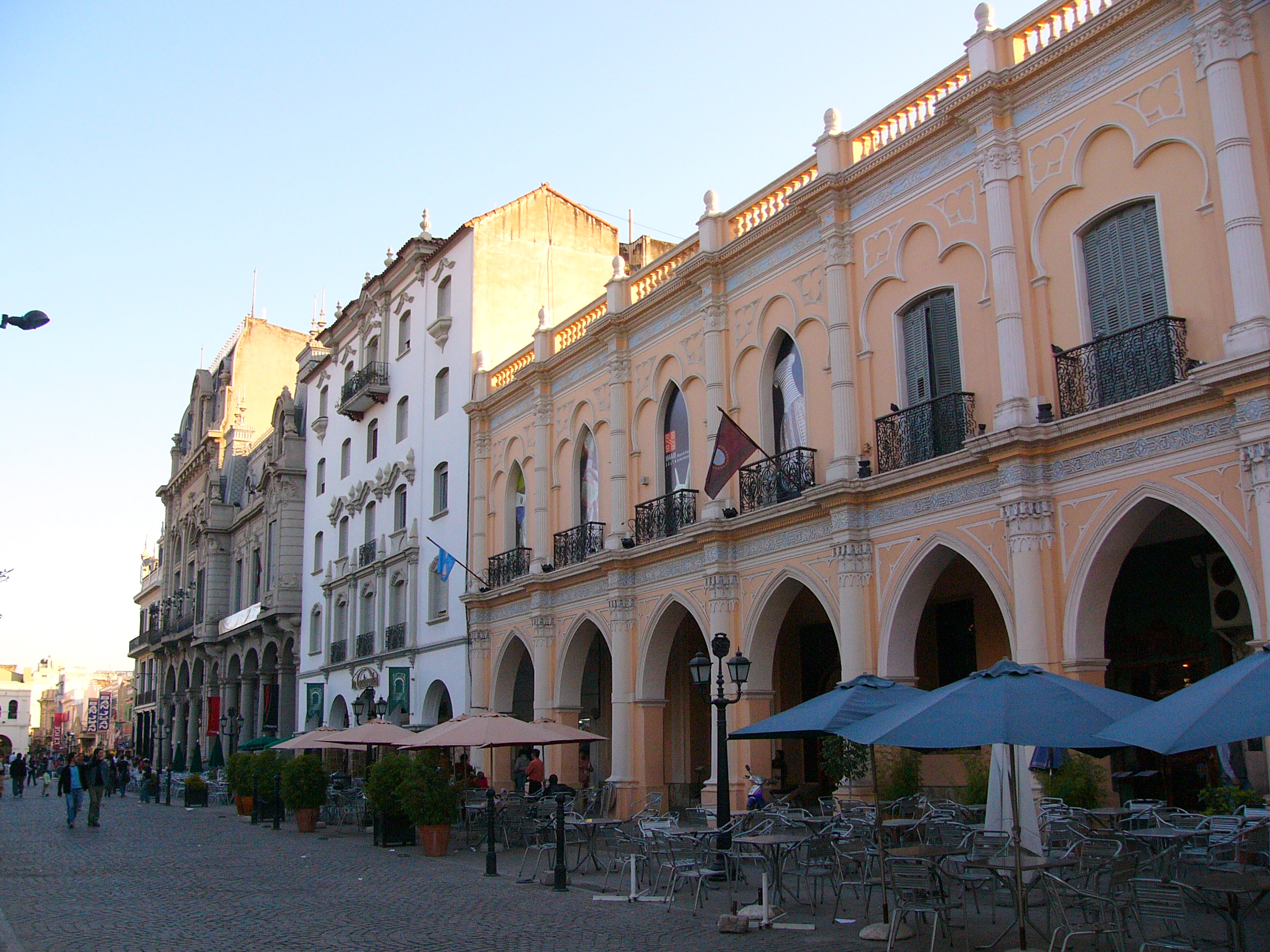
Spanish Colonial architecture in Salta

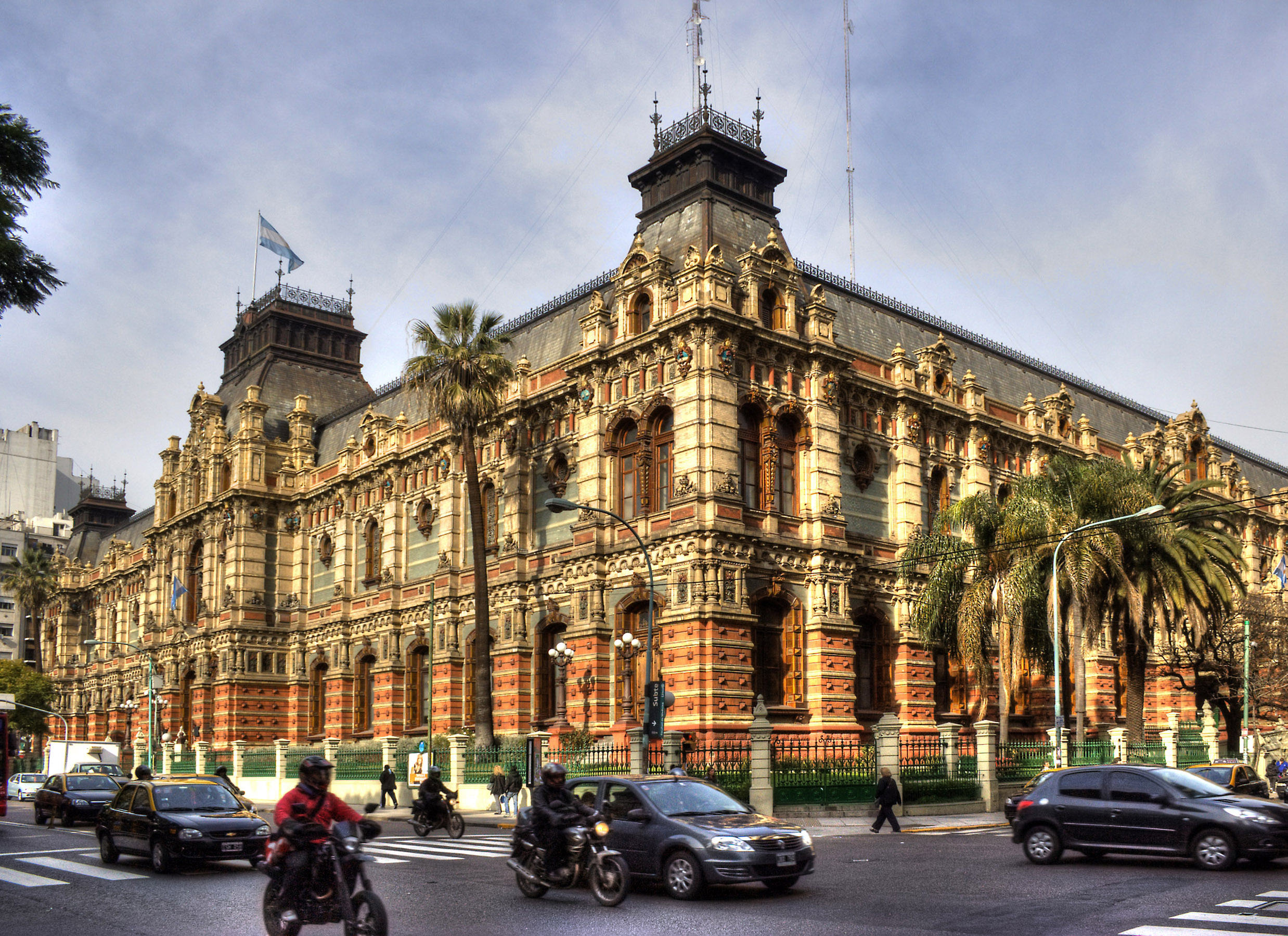
Eclectic style in the Palace of Running Waters, Buenos Aires

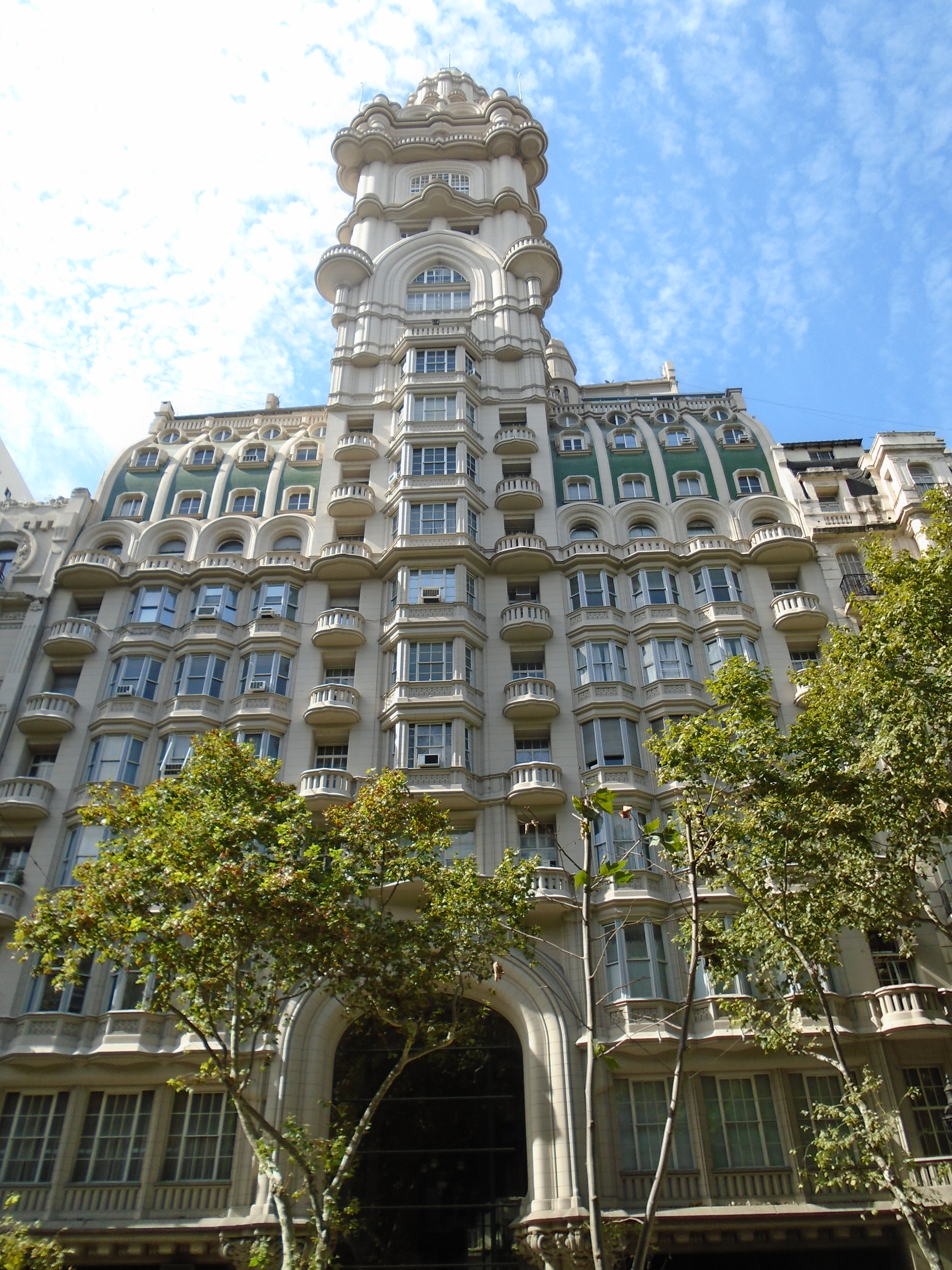
Art Nouveau in the Barolo Palace, Buenos Aires

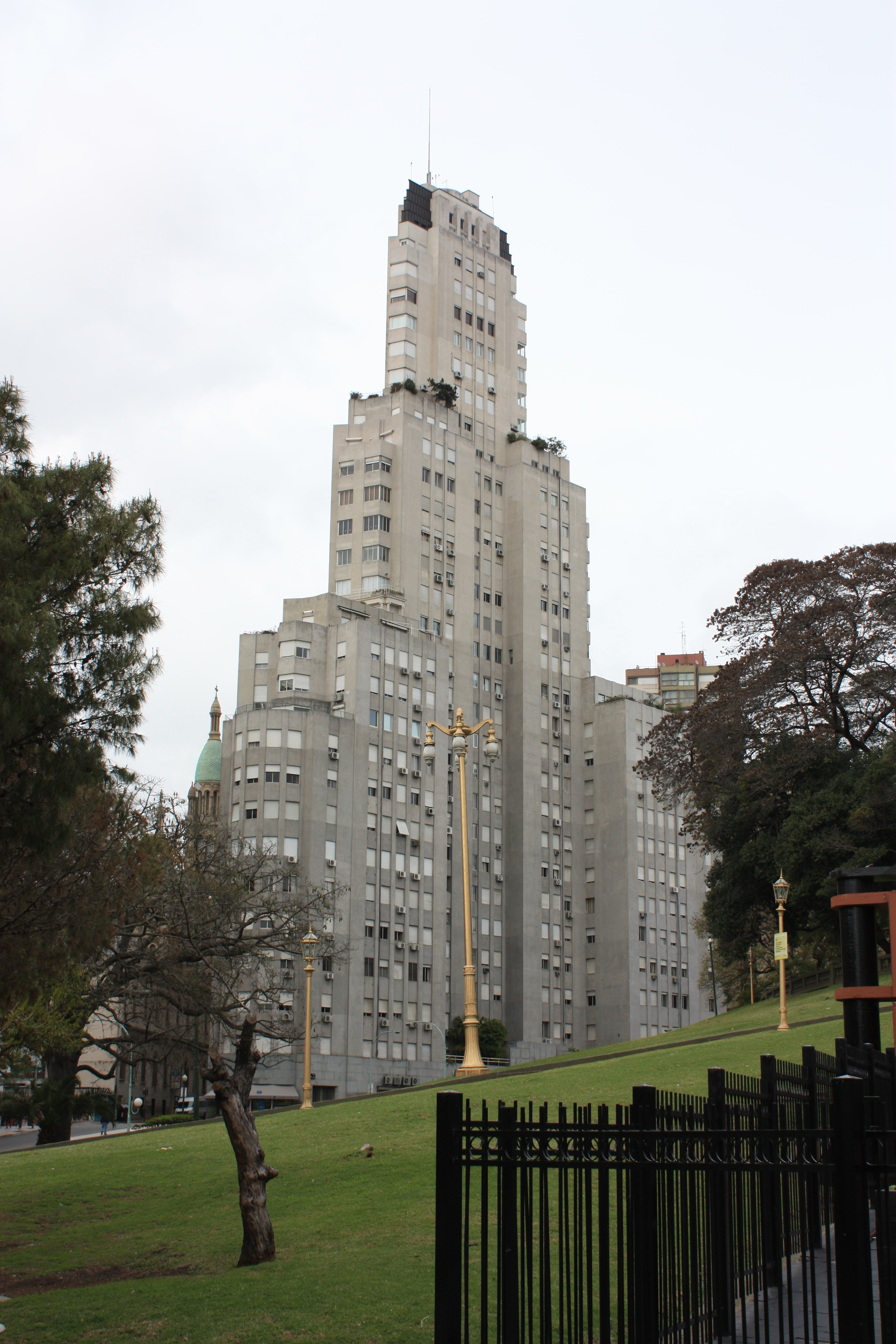
Art Deco in the Kavanagh Building, Buenos Aires

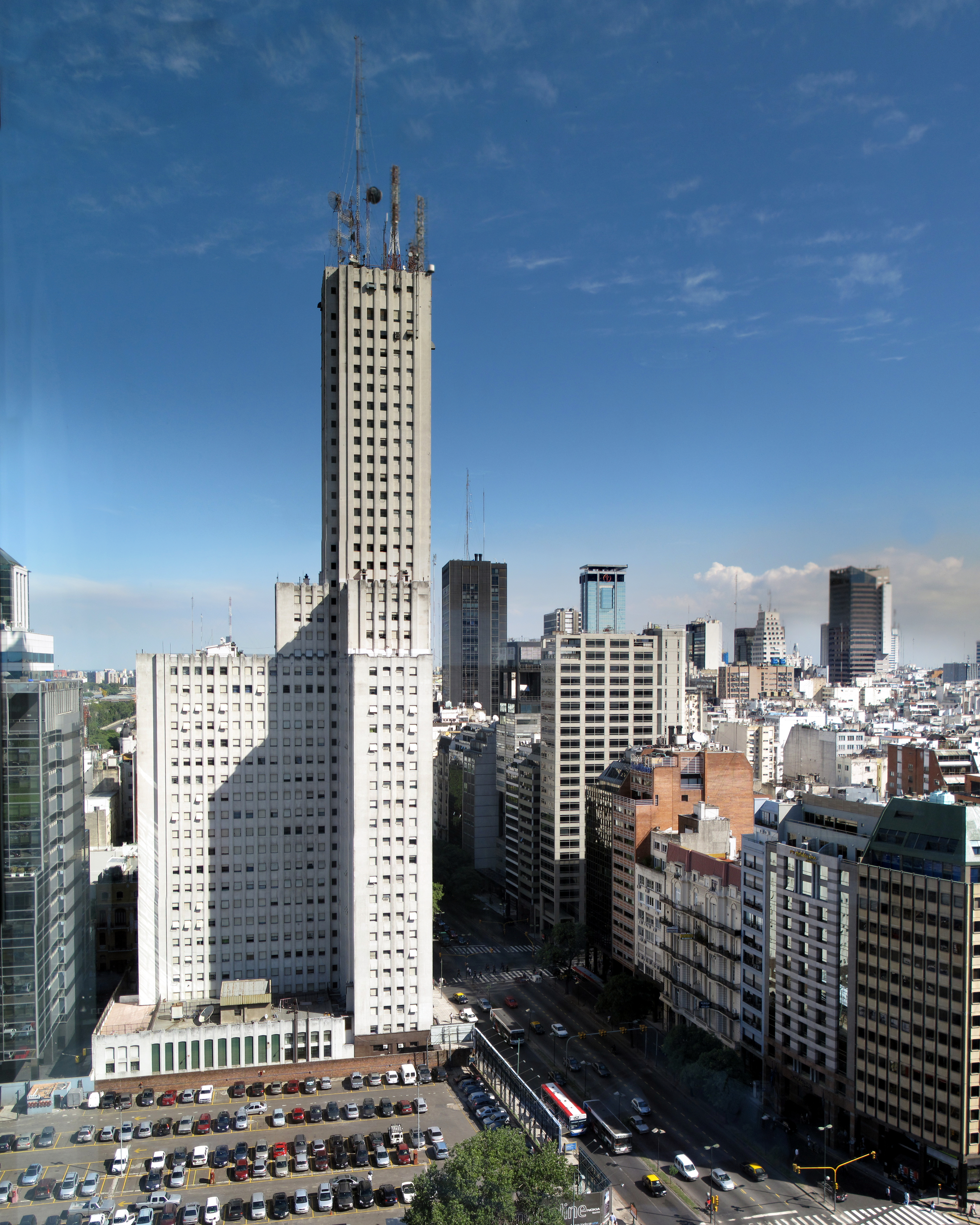
Rationalist in the Alas Building, Buenos Aires

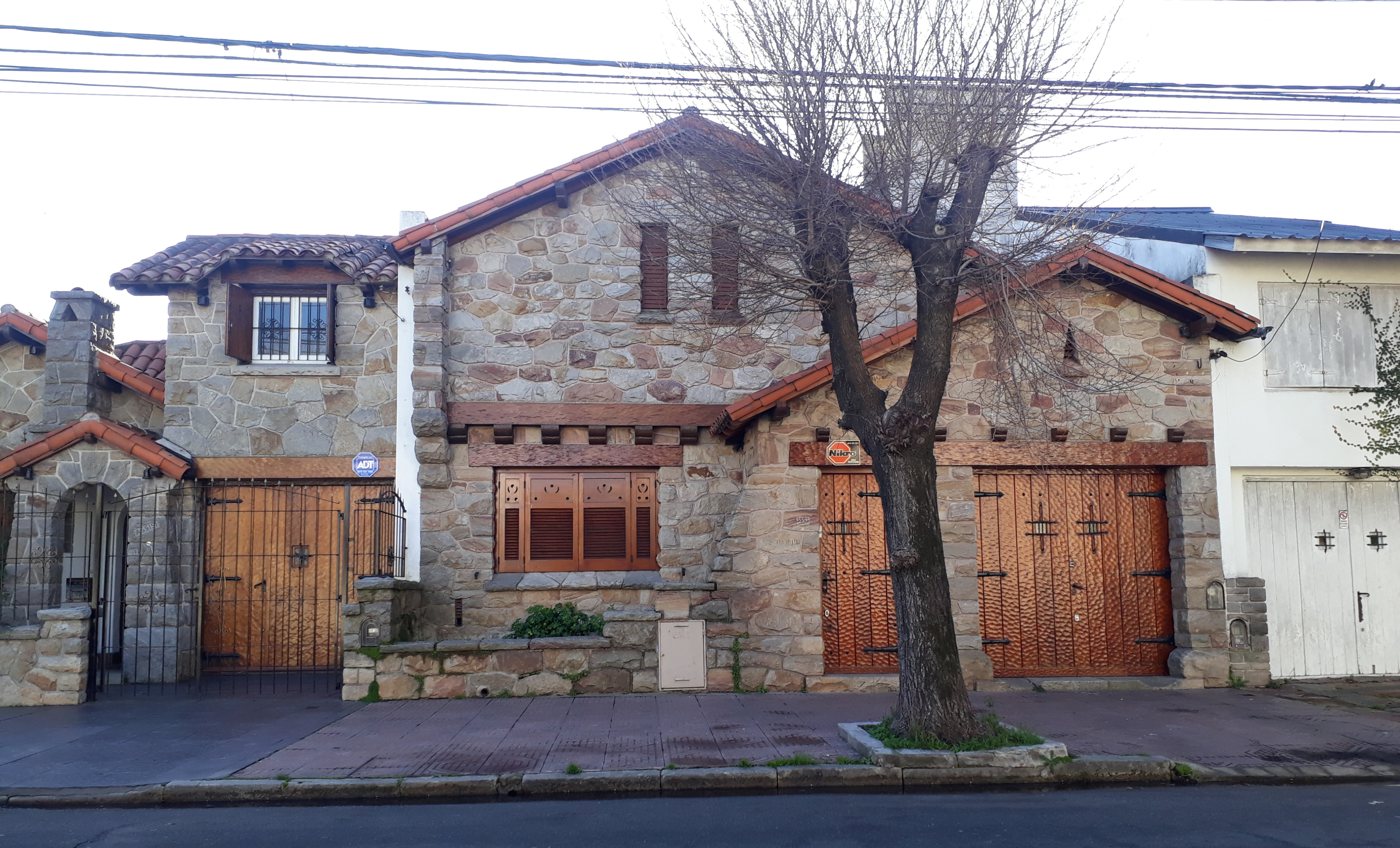
Chalet marplatense, Mar del Plata

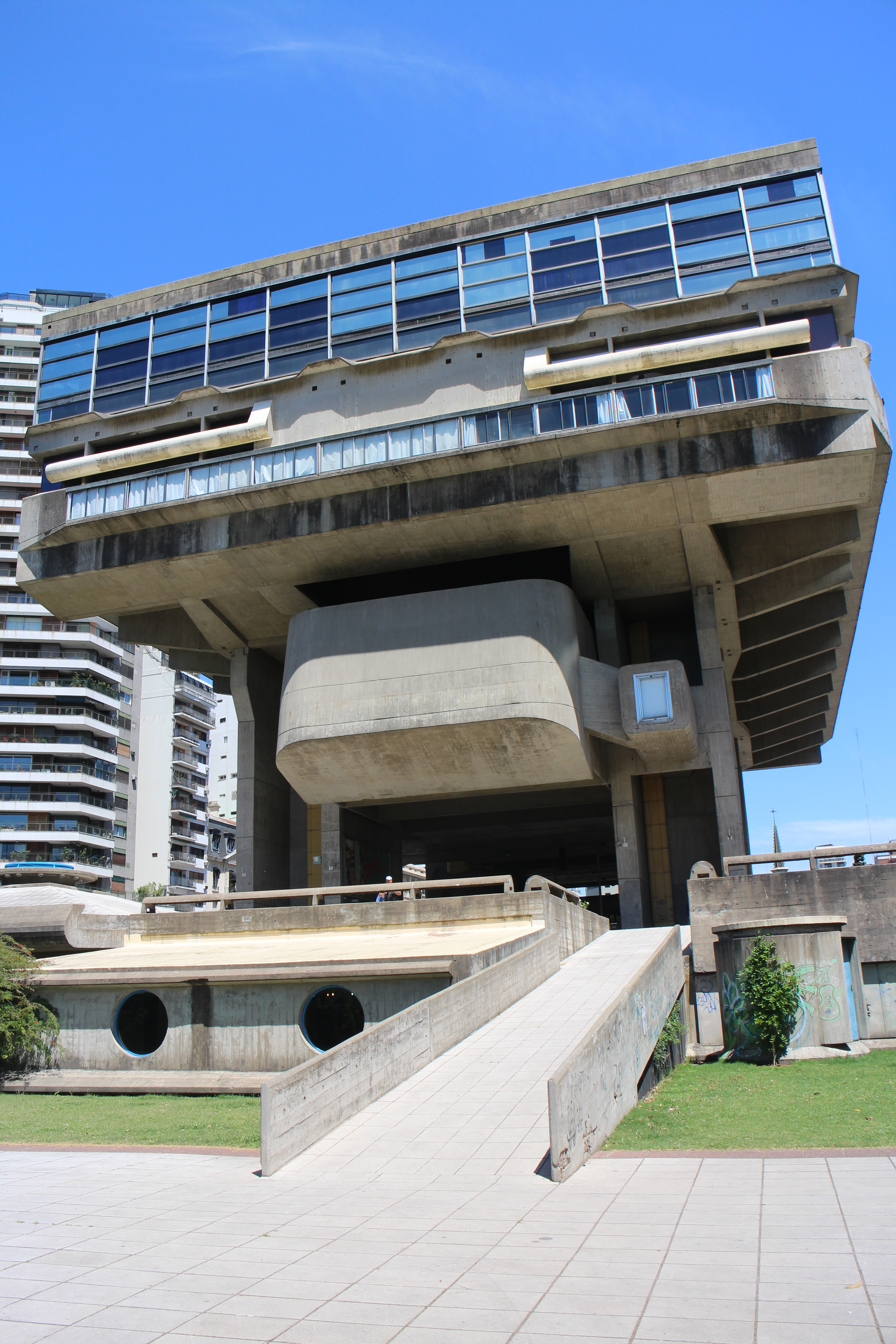
Brutalist in the Argentine National Library, Buenos Aires

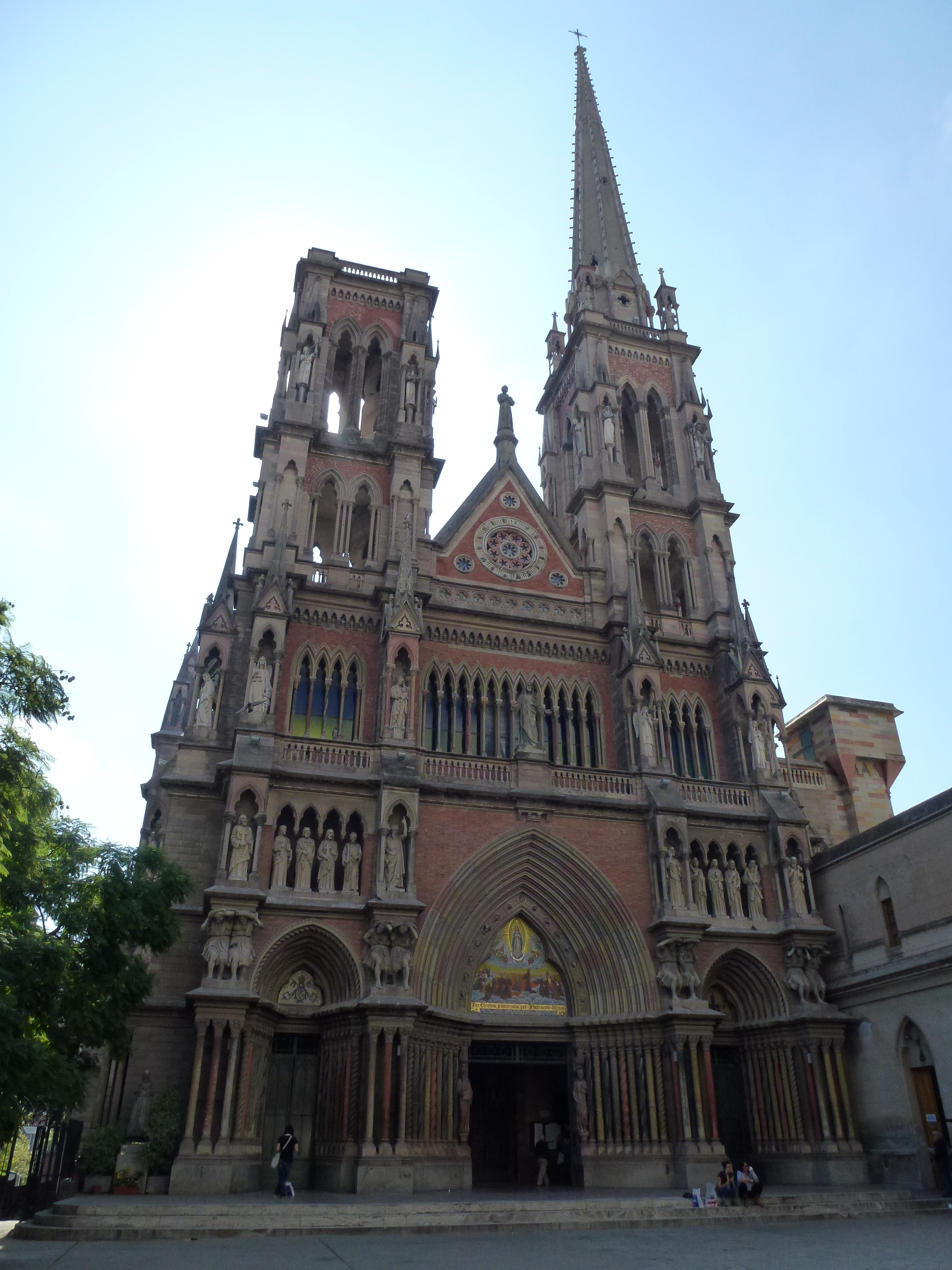
Neo-Gothic in the Capuchin Church, Córdoba

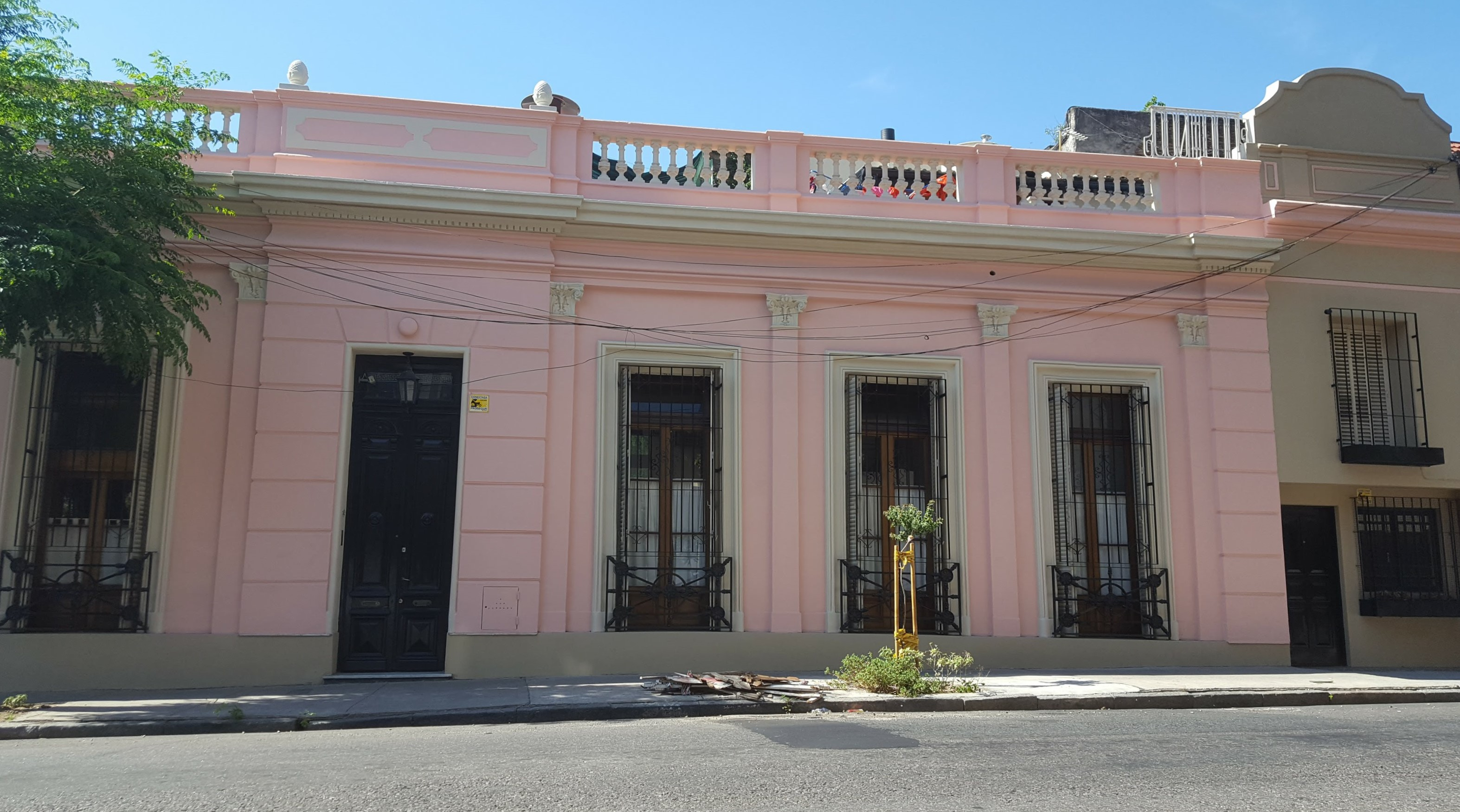
Casa Chorizo, Buenos Aires
