= Pueyrredón =

Pueyrredón may refer to:

- ARA Pueyrredón, a Garibaldi-class armoured cruiser of the Argentine Navy
- Chilean brigantine Águila (1796), the first ship of the Chilean Navy, renamed Pueyrredón
- Club Pueyrredón, a rugby union club in Tigre Partido within Greater Buenos Aires
- General Pueyrredón Partido, administrative subdivision on the Atlantic coast of Buenos Aires Province, Argentina
- Honorio Pueyrredón (1876–1945), an Argentine lawyer, university professor, diplomatic and politician
- Juan Martín de Pueyrredón (1776–1850), an Argentine general and politician of the early 19th century
- Juan Martín de Pueyrredón Museum, Buenos Aires, near Acassuso, in the partido of San Isidro, in Buenos Aires, Argentina
- Prilidiano Pueyrredón (1823–1870), an Argentine painter, architect, and engineer
- Pueyrredón family, family in Argentina
- Villa Pueyrredón, a neighbourhood of Buenos Aires, capital of Argentina
- Pueyrredón (Line B Buenos Aires Metro)
- Pueyrredón (Line D Buenos Aires Metro)
