= Faculty of Economic Sciences, University of Buenos Aires =

Faculty of the University of Buenos Aires

Faculty of Economic Sciences
- Facultad de Ciencias Económicas
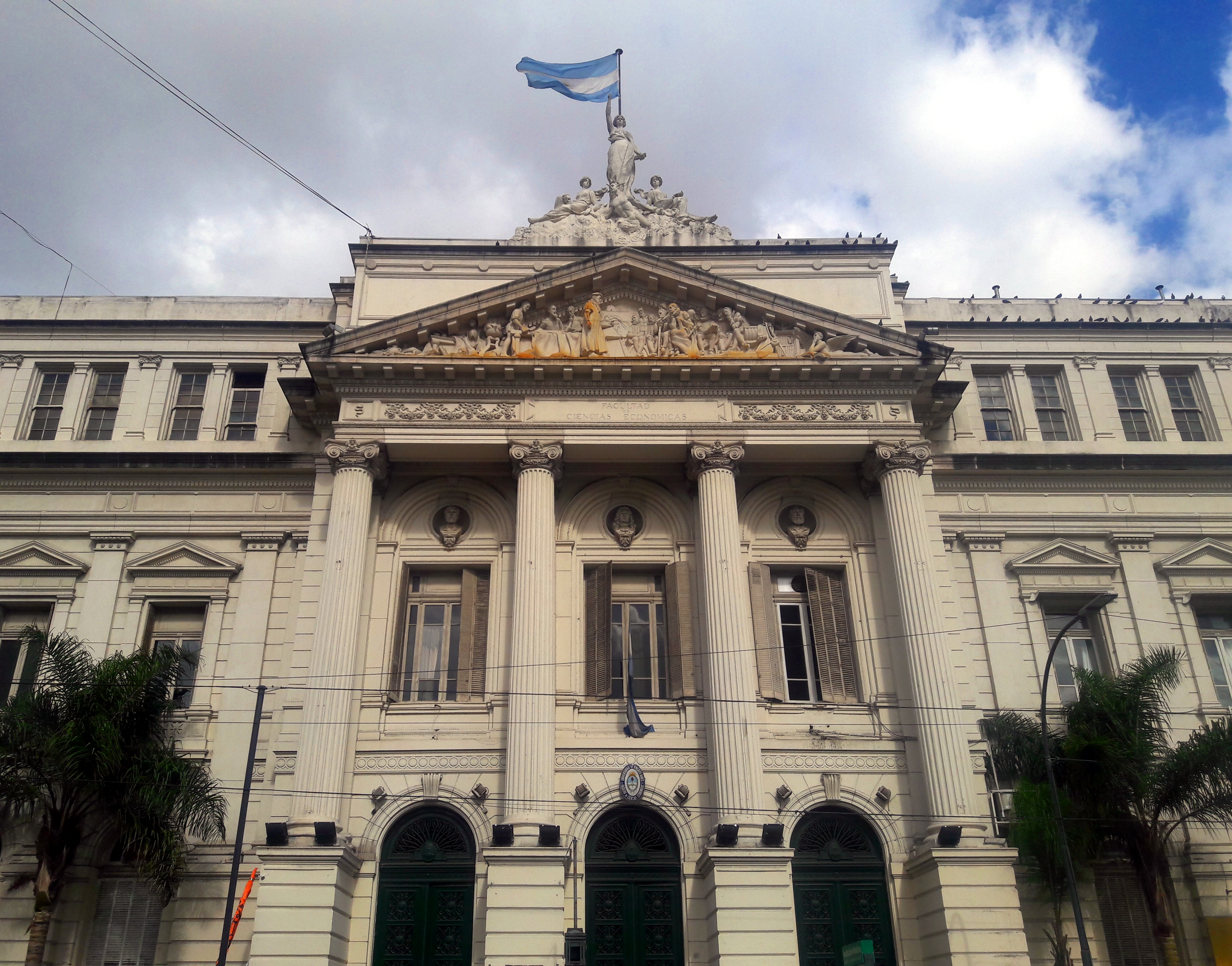
- FCE seat on Avenida Córdoba
- Type: Faculty
- Established: 1913; 113 years ago
- Affiliation: University of Buenos Aires
- Dean: Ricardo Palhen Acuña
- Students: 36,233
- Address: Av. Córdoba 2122, Buenos Aires, Argentina; 34.3600°S 58.2352°W
- Website: economicas.uba.ar
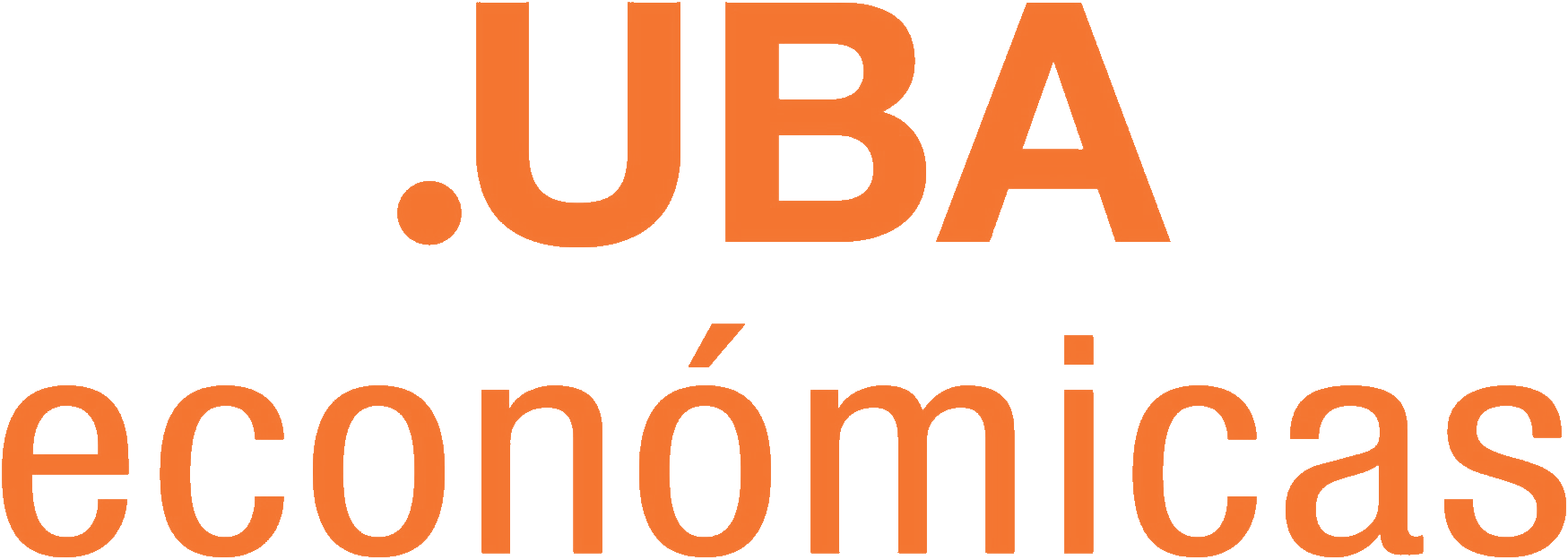

The Faculty of Economic Sciences (Spanish: Facultad de Ciencias Económicas; FCE), also simply known as Económicas, is a faculty of the University of Buenos Aires (UBA), the largest university in Argentina. Established in 1913 as the Instituto de Altos Estudios Comerciales, it is now the largest faculty within UBA, with over 36,000 grad students. The Faculty of Economic Sciences has the highest rate of international postgraduate students at 30 percent, in line with its reputation as a "top business school with significant international influence."

The faculty has its seat on a Neoclassical building on Avenida Córdoba, one of the main thoroughfares of Buenos Aires. The building was designed by Francisco Tamburini in 1908, and originally also housed the Faculty of Medicine. The building faces Plaza Bernardo Houssay, opposite of which is the new seat of the Faculty of Medicine, the Teaching Hospital José de San Martín, and a number of other UBA dependencies and facilities.

== History ==
The Faculty of Economic Sciences traces its history to the Instituto de Altos Estudios Comerciales ("Institute for Higher Commercial Studies"), founded in 1913. It originally had its seat on the third floor of the Escuela Superior de Comercio building, on Marcelo T. de Alvear 1851. The institute soon outgrew its facilities, and in 1908, it was moved to a new building on Avenida Córdoba built by Francisco Tamburini, which was originally built for the Escuela Práctica de Medicina and judicial morgue of the Faculty of Medicine, which had its seat in a twin building next to it.

In 1937, the Faculty of Medicine was moved to a bigger new building on the other side of what would become Plaza Houssay. During the early stages of planning for the Ciudad Universitaria campus, the Faculty of Economic Sciences was expected to have its seat in the purpose-built complex, but these plans were never followed through. An annex building for the faculty was built from 2008 to 2011 and inaugurated on 9 March 2011 by President Cristina Fernández de Kirchner. The annex was built using a $1.3 million USD donation by FCE alumnus Daniel Nycz. Both buildings, the old building and the new annex, are connected through a central patio.

== Degrees ==
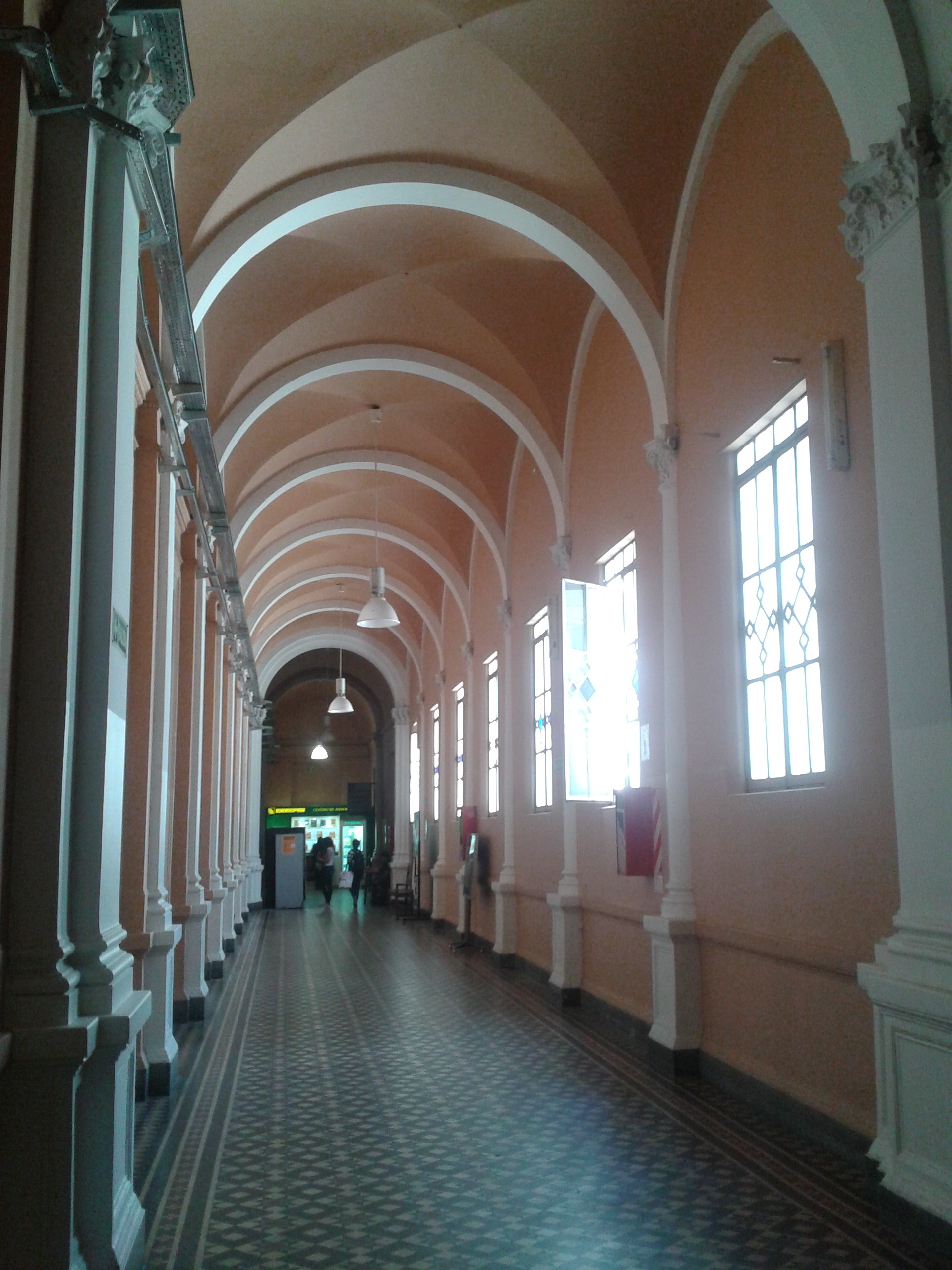
Hallway in the old Económicas building

The Faculty of Economic Sciences presently offers five graduate degrees:

- Licenciatura on Economy
- Licenciatura on Business Administration
- Licenciatura on Business Administration Systems
- Public accountancy
- Actuarial science

In addition, the faculty offers a number of specialization degrees, as well as magister degrees, doctorates and post-doctoral degrees in diverse fields, such as TIC and services, management and marketing, finances, public sector, international economy and business, and accounting, auditing and taxation.

== Research institutes and dependencies ==
The Faculty of Economic Sciences has three research institutes: the Instituto de Investigaciones en Administración, Contabilidad y Métodos Cuantitativos para la Gestión ("Institute of Administration, Accounting and Quantitative Management Methods", IADCOM), the Instituto Interdisciplinario de Economía Política de Buenos Aires ("Buenos Aires Interdisciplinary Institute of Political Economy", IIEP – a joint institute alongside CONICET), and the Instituto de Investigaciones en Gestión, Desarrollo y Control de Organizaciones ("Institute of Research on Organization Management, Development and Control", IGEDECO).

In addition, up to 27 research centers operate under the scope of FCE. The faculty also oversees one of UBA's museums, the Museum of Foreign Debt.

== Political and institutional life ==
Like the rest of the University of Buenos Aires's faculties, FCE operates under the principle of tripartite co-governance, wherein authorities are democratically elected and professors, students and graduates are represented in the faculty's governing bodies. The faculty is headed by a Dean (Spanish: decano or decana), who presides over the Directive Council (Consejo Directivo). The Directive Council is made up of eight representatives for the professors, four representatives of the student body, and four representatives of the faculty's graduates. Deans are elected by the Directive Council every four years, while elections to the council take place every two years.

Since 2018, the dean of the Faculty of Economic Sciences has been Ricardo Pahlen Acuña. Until 2022, the faculty's vice dean was Radical Civic Union congressman Emiliano Yacobitti.

== Notable people ==
The Faculty of Economic Sciences has produced a number of prominent economists. Raúl Prebisch, creator of the Prebisch–Singer hypothesis and a major proponent of dependency theory, studied and later taught economy at FCE. Economy ministers of diverse political views and pertaining to different economic schools of thought have also earned their degrees at UBA; among them José Martínez de Hoz, Roberto Lavagna, Axel Kicillof, and Nicolás Dujovne. Other FCE alumni include Mercedes Marcó del Pont, Carlos Melconian, Alejandro Vanoli and Mario Firmenich.
