= Carlos Melconian =

Argentine economist and politician

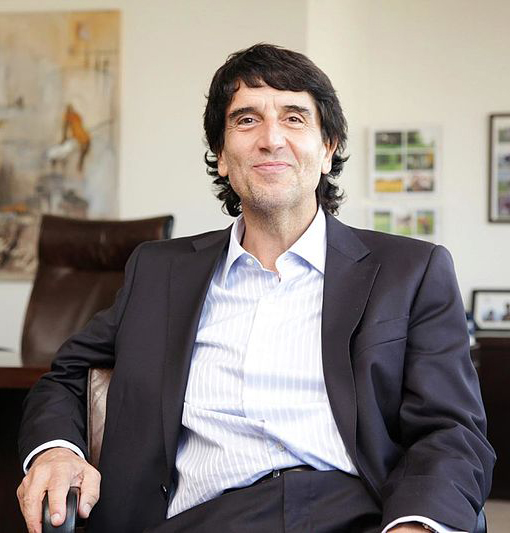
Carlos Melconian

Carlos Alberto Melconian (born November 6, 1956) is an Argentine economist and politician. He served as president of the Banco de la Nacion Argentina from December 23, 2015, to 18 January 2017.

== Education and career ==
He has a degree in Economics from the University of Buenos Aires Faculty of Economic Sciences, and a master's degree in Economics from the Torcuato di Tella University.

In 2023 Patricia Bullrich proposed him as his minister of economy if she was elected president.
