= List of archives in Argentina =

This is the list of archives in Argentina.

== Archives in Argentina ==
- General Archive of the Nation (Argentina)
- Archivo de la Iglesia Catedral de San Miguel de Tucumán
- Archivo General de la Provincia de Córdoba
- Archivo General de la Provincia de Santiago del Estero
- Archivo Histórico de la Ciudad de Buenos Aires
- Archivo Histórico de la Provincia de Tucumán
- Archivo Histórico Provincial de Salta

== See also ==
- List of archives
- List of museums in Argentina
- Culture of Argentina
- Portal de Archivos Españoles (federated search of archives in Spain)
