= Provincial Museum of Fine Arts "Dr. Pedro E. Martínez" =

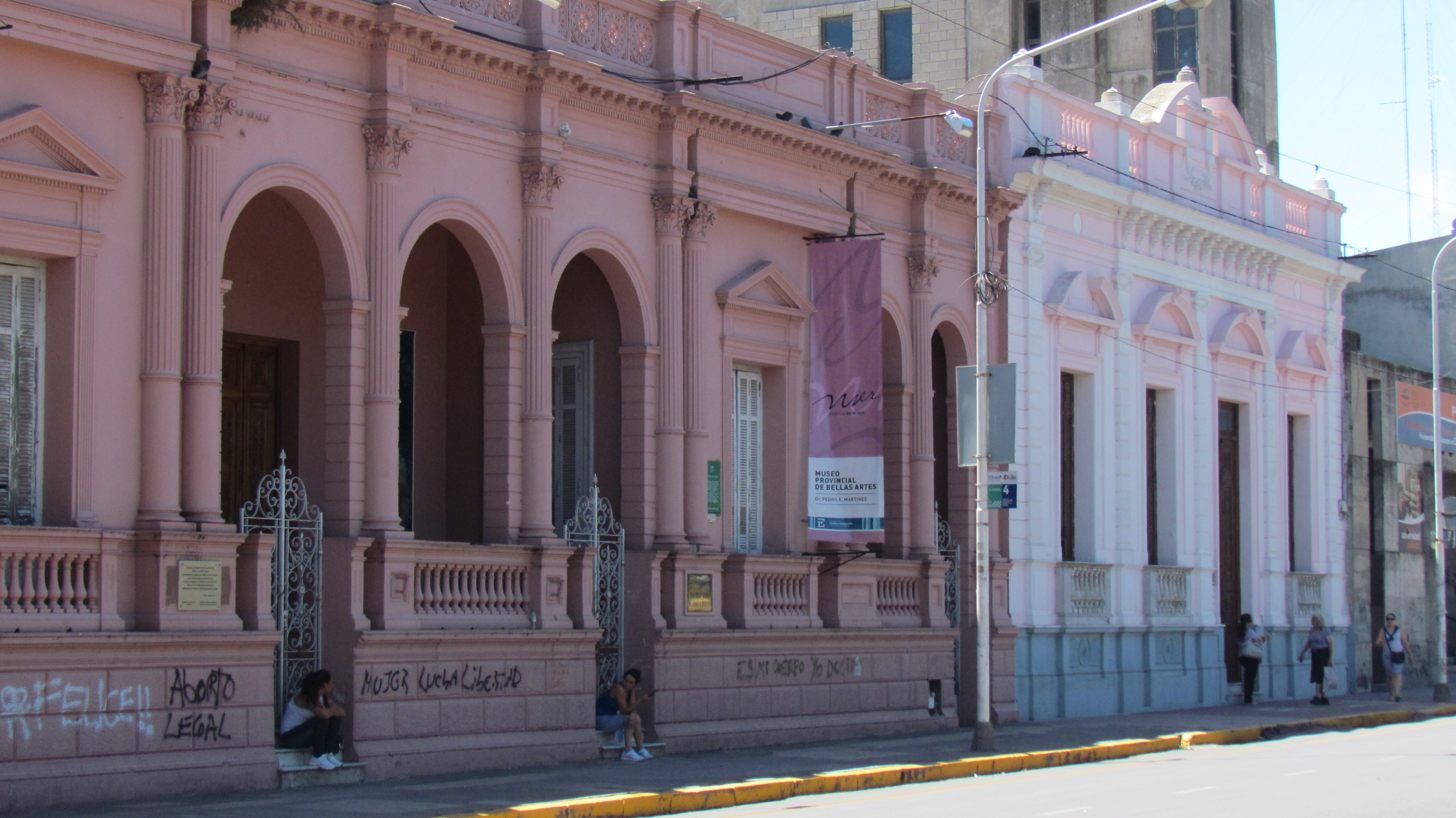
- Established: August 30, 1926; 99 years ago
- Location: Paraná, Argentina
- Coordinates: 31.727545°S 60.530019°W
- Type: Art museum

The Provincial Museum of Fine Arts "Dr. Pedro E. Martínez" (Spanish: Museo Provincial de Bellas Artes "Dr. Pedro E. Martínez") is a museum located in Paraná, Argentina.

== History ==
During the 1910s and 1920s in Argentina, there was the idea of creating provincial museums around the country. In 1926, the museum was inaugurated and named after the lawyer Pedro E. Martinez, who was the director of the museum until 1935. In 1938, the name of the museum was changed to Museo de Bellas Artes Pedro E. Martínez to honor the lawyer's work. The museum was originally located in the Centennial School of Parana, in 1980, the museum was established in the house of the Tezanos Pintos family, this house was acquired by the Government of the Entre Rios Province to establish the museum in this place. Between 1978 and 1980, during the Argentine dictatorship, the building was used as a clandestine detention and torture center. In 2012, a plaque was placed to identify it as a Site of Memory to be used as a reminder of the time of the dictatorship.

== Collections ==
The museum contains about 1,350 works of art including paintings, ceramics, drawings and sculpture. The museum has contained artistic works by the artists Cesáreo Bernaldo de Quirós, Benito Quinquela Martín, Emilio Caraffa and Juan Carlos Migliavacca. The museum has a hall dedicated to the artists of plastic art of the Province of Entre Ríos. The museum also has exhibits dedicated to the textile arts. In 1961, an exhibition of Eduardo Serón's art pieces was held in this fine arts museum. In 2013, a temporal exhibition was presented at the museum with works of art by the painter Joan Miró, in collaboration with the Cultural Office of the Embassy of Spain.
