= Casa chorizo =

Type of house common in Argentina and Uruguay

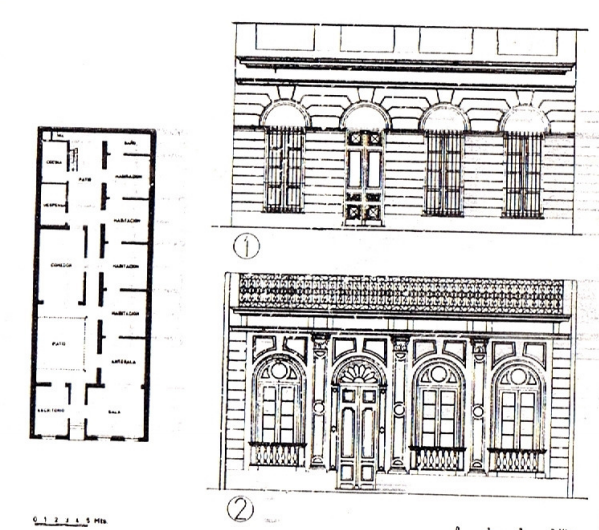
Basic design of a Standard House in Montevideo.

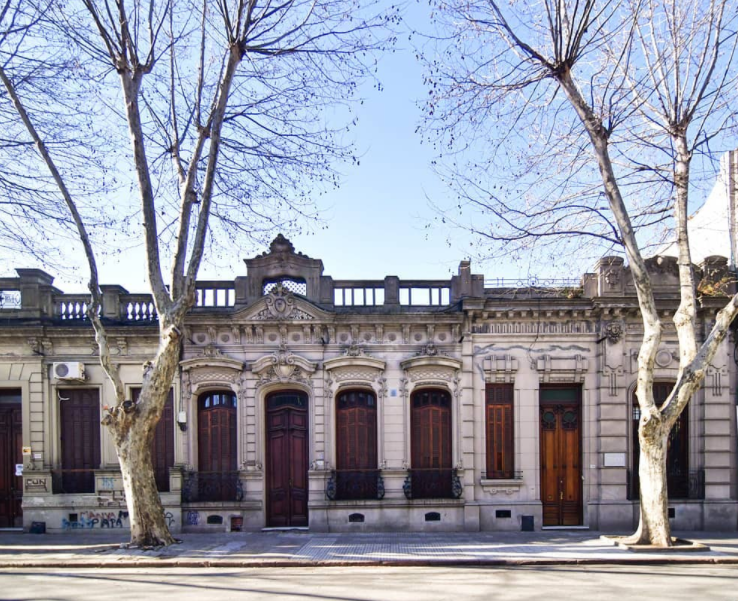
These homes have become an integral part of the urban landscape in cities like Montevideo.

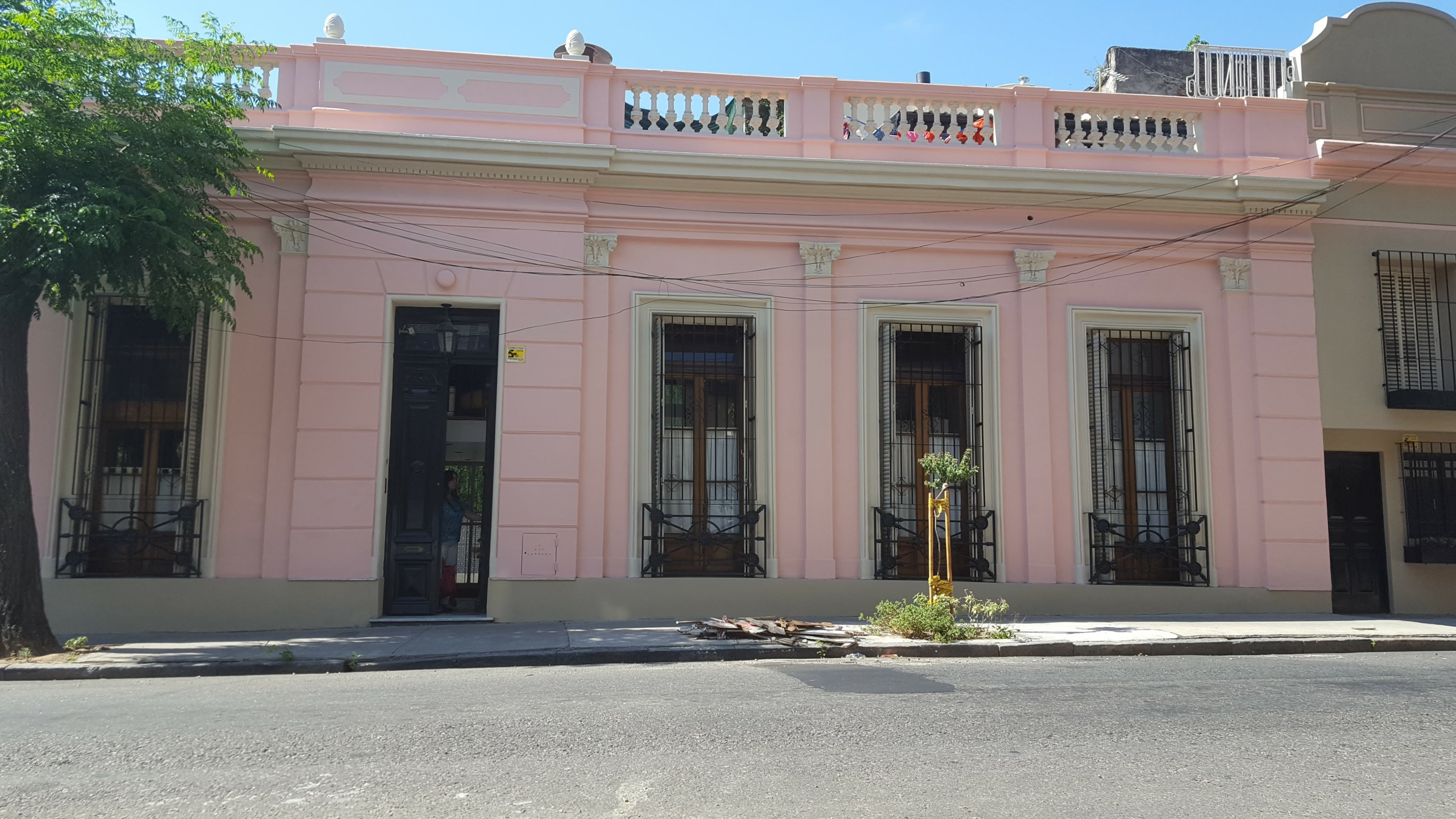
A Casa Chorizo with its long side (typical in streetblock corners) facing the street in Buenos Aires

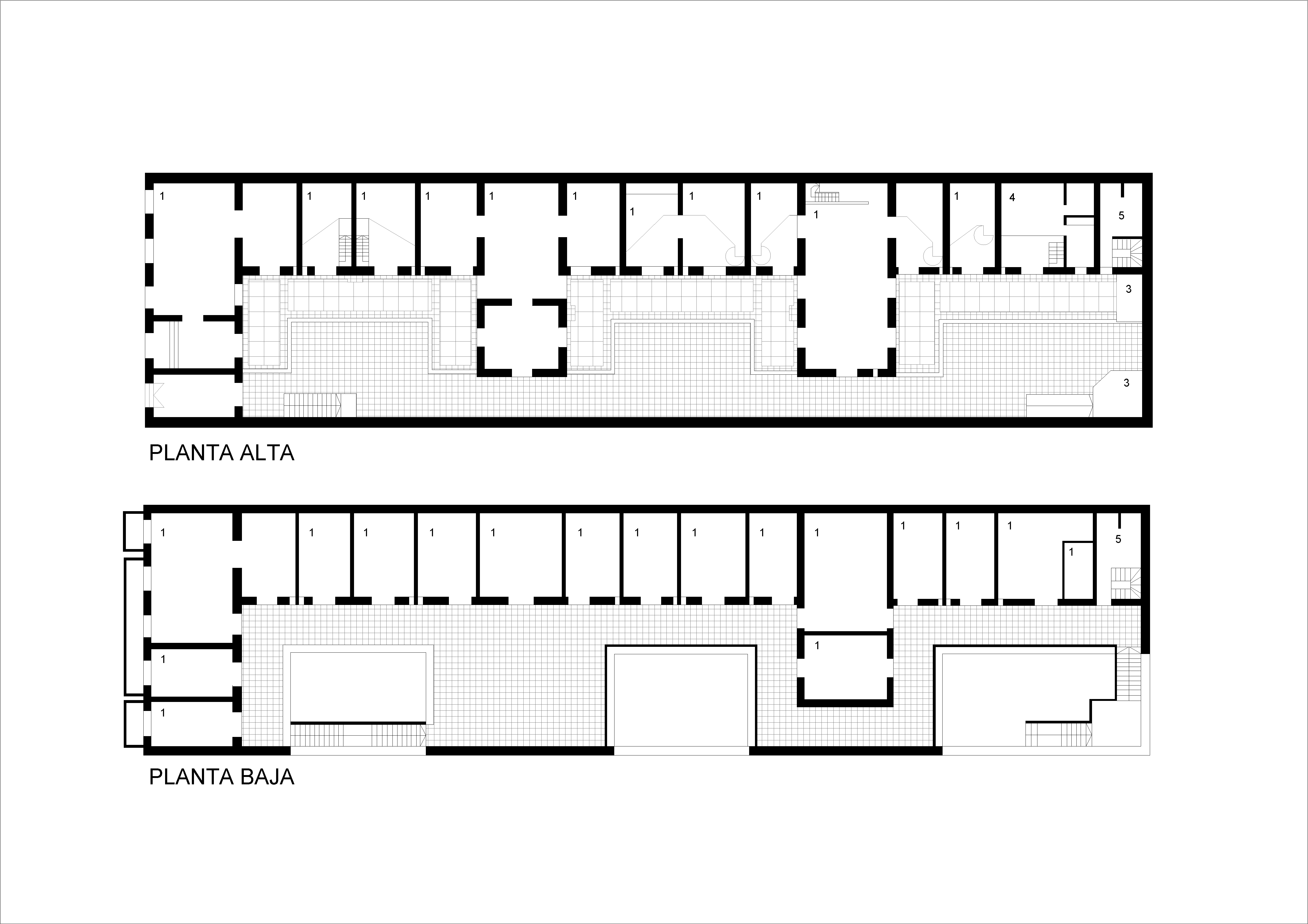
The floor plan is characterised by a narrow facade and a deep interior.

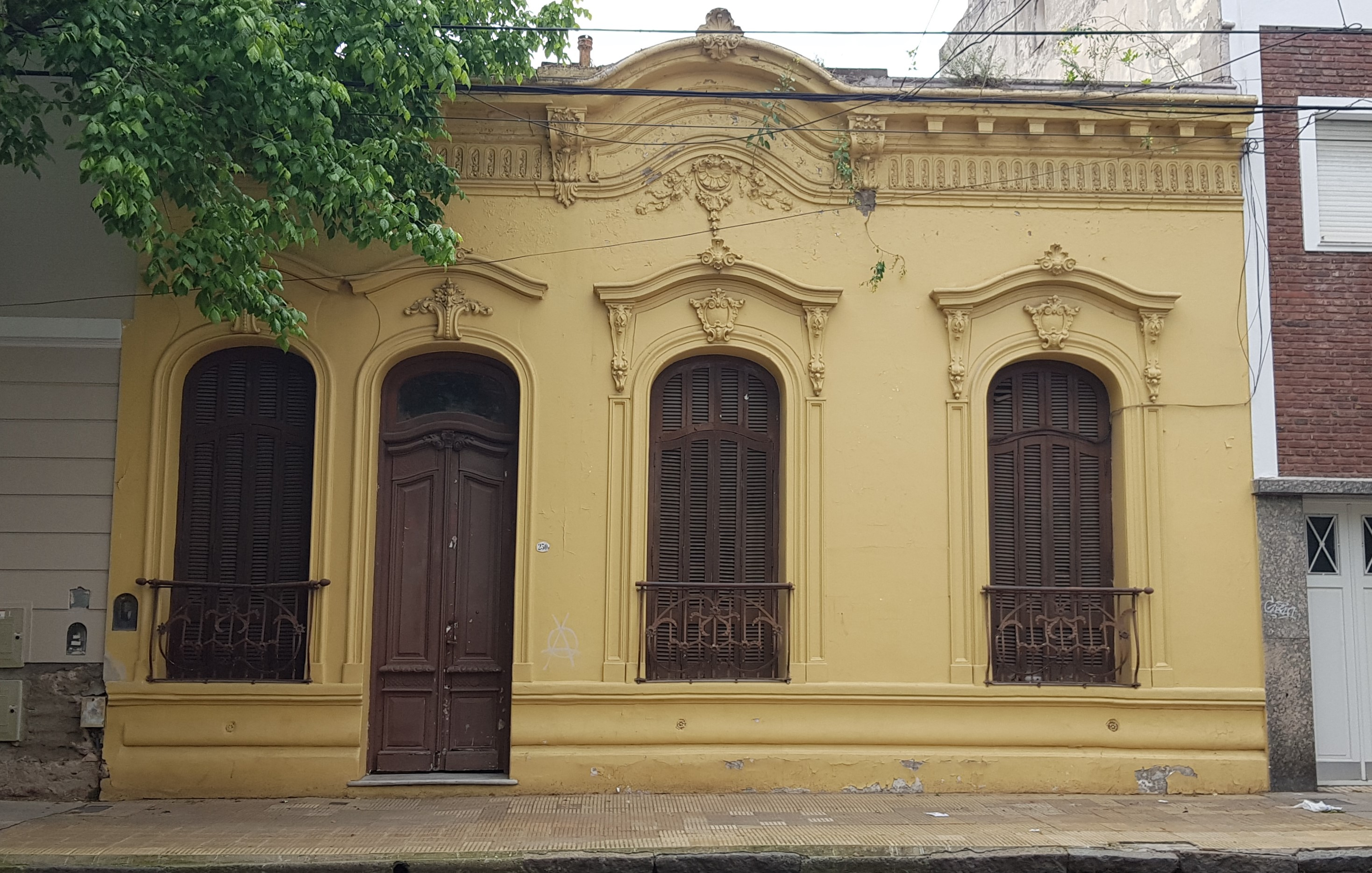
Casa Chorizo with short side (8.66 metres) on street

A Casa Chorizo, Casa Patio, or (formally) a Standard House (Casa Standard) is a popular type of dwelling from the late 19th to early 20th century in Argentina and Uruguay. They were predominantly built in Montevideo, Buenos Aires, and Rosario.

This style of house is characterized by a rectangular facade with three windows and an ornamental door. It has a rectangular layout, with an indoor patio on one of its long sides. Multiple square rooms are centered around this patio, and the lack of internal hallways means one must either walk through the patio or between adjacent rooms when moving throughout the house.

== History ==
From 1850 onward, immigration waves from middle-class families leaving Italy and Spain greatly increased the population of the Río de la Plata region. Standard houses were developed to make more efficient use of urban space. Most of these houses were built between 1880 and 1930.

The designs of these houses are based on Roman houses, Pompeyan houses, and traditional colonial urban living in the Rio de la Plata region. In general, they are centered around square patios and split into two "L" shaped houses, with each household owning half the patio. They were entirely built with stone bricks, and to show the socioeconomic status of the homeowner and family, Italian-style ornaments were added to the street-facing facades (fachadas) including columns, capitals, and emblems, together with high windows and high doors.

== Dimensions and layout ==
The typical dimensions of these houses are based on the old city measurements that used varas. A colonial block of houses measured 150 varas, and each house width was given 10 varas (8.66 metres.) Average house length varies between 16 and 30 meters and depending on the width (up to half a block deep, around 50 metres), the house may have an additional back garden. Most of these houses are built with their short walls facing the street, so more houses can fit beside each other. Some rare houses are built with the long side to the street and receive natural light both from the street and the internal patio.

The rooms measure 4x4 metres. All rooms that have doors have windows above them facing the internal patio for ventilation. A ceiling height between 4–5 metres helps further to diffuse both the high summer heat and colder winter temperatures. In addition, these buildings also have floor ventilation spaces, which are connected through air vents in the facade's front wall both under and over the windows.

The houses are rectangle-shaped with all rooms interconnected, and with the entrance on a short side. The layout is based on a "hierarchy of rooms". The bathroom, kitchen and dining room are furthest away from the entrance. Some following rooms might include a children's room, grandparent's room, parents' room or an activities room. From the entrance, the first area is the hallway, from which the patio and the main social room are accessible. More intimate or well-known visitors are invited further back into the home.

One can enter rooms rooms through inner doors, or walk through a gallery in the patio, typically covered with a small roof to protect against the rain and sun.

== Heritage and revival ==
This style of house is once again becoming fashionable due to their high-quality brick construction, ventilation, spaciousness, and extensive history. They are mainly used as family residences and in many cases are modernized to increase livability, for example: by tearing down internal walls to create an open layout, or building garages and mezzanines to better utilize the high ceilings. The roofs are often converted into terraces to provide additional outdoor space.

In certain neighborhoods, such as Palermo and San Telmo, these buildings are converted into commercial spaces such as medical or legal offices, retail stores, bars, and even restaurants.

However, as the value of land rises, an increasing number of owners have sold their houses to be converted into high-rise buildings. As such, there are various ongoing initiatives to protect the cultural heritage of standard houses.
