= Museo Pueyrredon =

Museum in Acassuso, San Isidro, Argentina

The Museo Pueyrredon, with the complete name of Museo Histórico Municipal “Brigadier General Juan Martín de Pueyrredón”, is located in the neighborhood of Acassuso, in the partido of San Isidro, in Buenos Aires Province, Argentina. The actual museum address is Rivera Indarte 48, Acassuso.

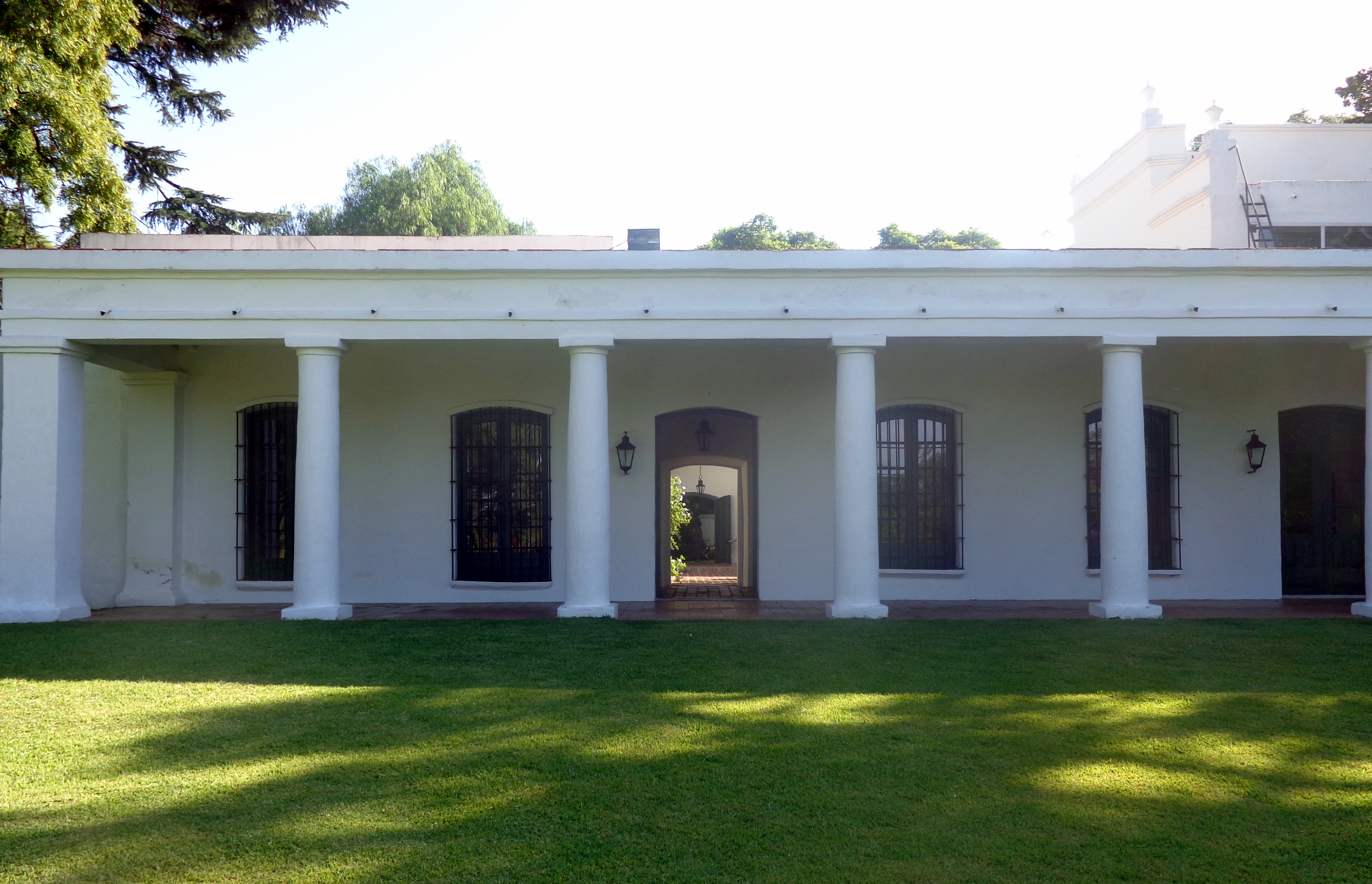
Museo Pueyrredón

The museum features furnishings, portraits, objects and documents related to the life of the general and his role in Argentine history during the early 19th century.

== History ==
After two years of restoration work and remodeling of the museum started in 2009, it was reopened to the public in April 2009 by the city Mayor, Gustavo Posse.
