= Museum of Foreign Debt =

Museum in Buenos Aires, Argentina

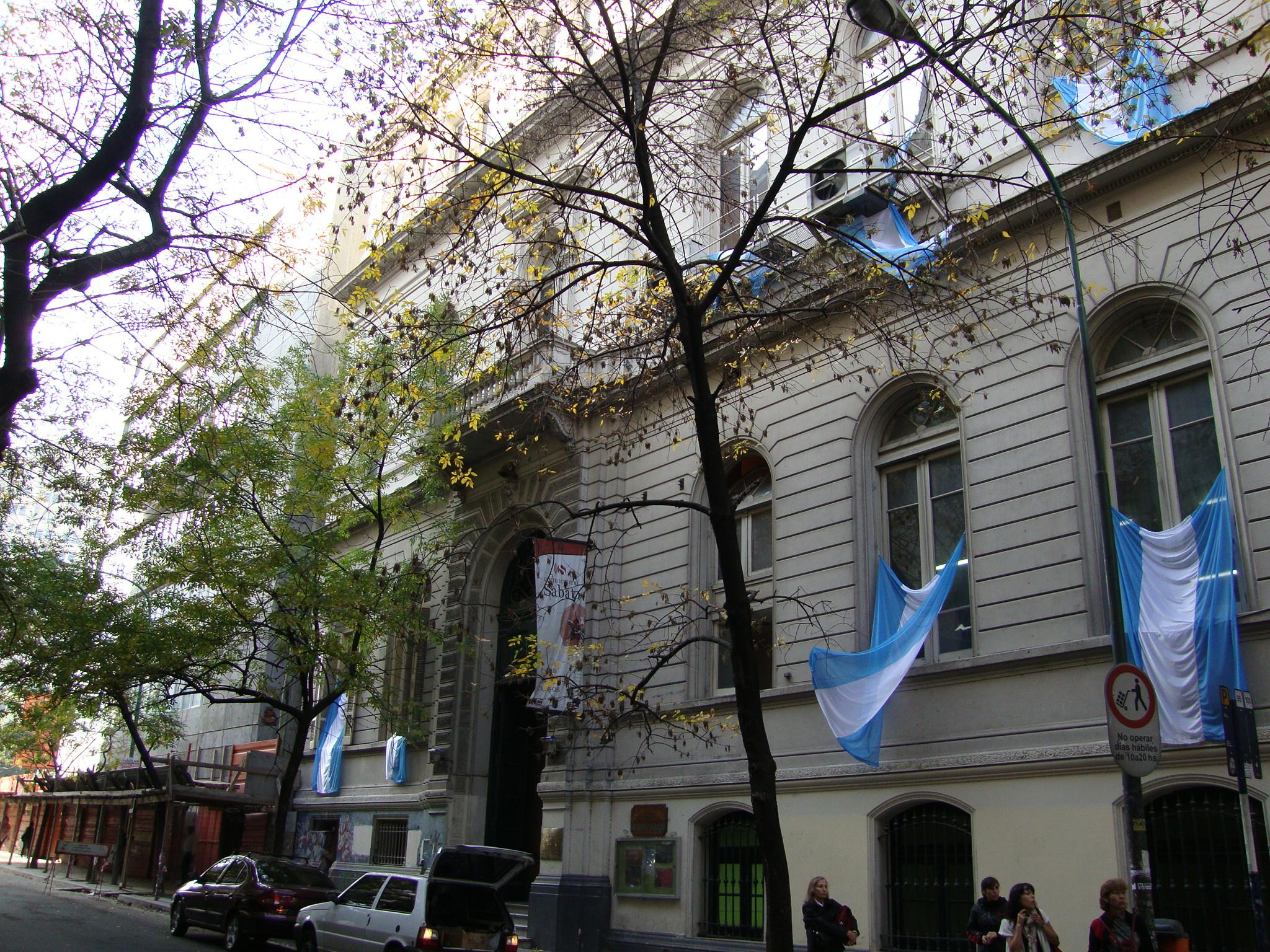
- Established: 2005
- Location: Buenos Aires, Argentina
- Coordinates: 34°36′01″S 58°23′55″W

The Museum of Foreign Debt (Spanish: Museo de la Deuda Externa) is a public museum located in Buenos Aires, Argentina, within the Faculty of Economic Sciences, University of Buenos Aires.

The museum's expositions and collection aim to depict the impact that foreign debt has had on Argentine economic development throughout its history.

== History ==
Founded in April 2005, the museum opened its doors following the 1998–2002 Argentine great depression and the nationwide 2001 Argentine riots. During those years, Argentina prompted the largest foreign debt default in history – approximately $100 billion USD.

The museum is sited within the University of Buenos Aires Faculty of Economic Sciences's main building. The idea for the museum arose in 2001, directly following the debt crisis, and came from a discussion amongst graduate students and professors in the faculty, who embarked on a task to create "a space to illustrate in a didactic and attractive way the history of Argentine debt". Their exhibition "Foreign Debt: Never Again" opened to the public in April 2005, marking the official inauguration of the museum.

The museum's items follow the Argentine national debt's history, recording its development and growth since the first attempt of independence in 1810 to the modern day. They hold an archive of over 1200 classified documents examining the history of national debt and unemployment in the country.

There is a travelling version of the museum, and they also hold online collections.

== See also ==
- Economy of Argentina
- University of Buenos Aires
