= Casa Argentina del Arte Correo =

Building complex in Buenos Aires, Argentina

Casa Argentina del Arte Correo or "Mail Art Argentine House" (or CADAC) is a building complex in Buenos Aires, Argentina with the function to exhibit "mail art". The library contains art on many media as well as historic and current publications; serving artists, researchers and the public alike.

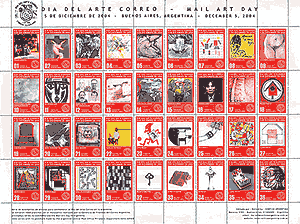
Stamps of Mail Art by CADAC

== Purpose ==
- To create a place of communication to program exhibitions, gatherings, and other events, both by us and by other national and foreign artists, promoting mail art activities in our country;
- To leave the traditional concept in modality and ways of expression, taking up riskier proposals, so that artists can experiment or test new art proposals with public, something conventional art galleries do not do;
- To publicize artists' works outside and inside the city, artists contacted through the Art Mail circuit. In this case, exhibited artworks will mainly come from "Vórtice Argentina" archives;
- To get people who come to CADAC not only to see artworks, but also to have the opportunity to meet the artworks' producer, and at the same time the producer receives feedback from the viewer. The idea is not to turn CADAC into a public exhibition venue, but to be used as a place for active meeting and participation.
