= Acassuso =

Place in Buenos Aires Province, Argentina

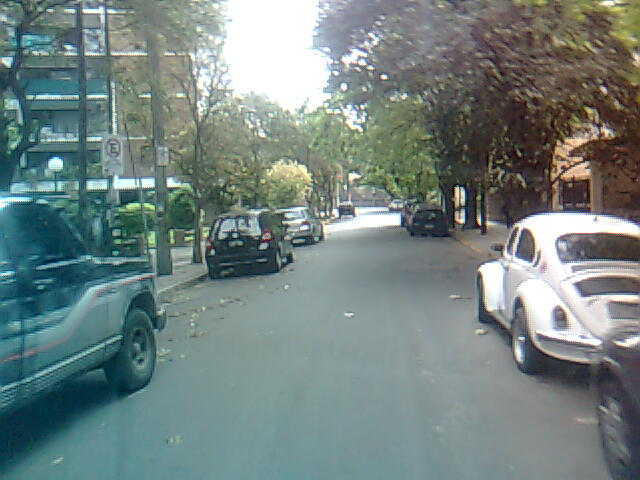

- Location in Greater Buenos Aires
- Coordinates: 34°28′S 58°31′W
- Country: Argentina
- Province: Buenos Aires
- Partido: San Isidro
- Elevation: 18 m (59 ft)

Population (2001 census [INDEC])
  - Total: 12,842
- CPA Base: B 1640
- Area code: +54 11

Acassuso is a locality in the San Isidro "partido" of Buenos Aires Province, Argentina. It is about 16 kilometres north of the city of Buenos Aires, between Olivos and San Isidro. It borders on the River Plate where an approximately 10 hectare municipal nature reserve "Refugio Natural Educativo de la Ribera Norte" exists since 1994. It is served by two commuter train services, the Tren de la Costa tourist line and the Mitre line.

== Sport ==
- Club Atlético Acassuso: Football club

== Notable people ==
- Francis Mallmann, Argentine celebrity chef, author and restaurateur
