= Obras Sanitarias de la Nación =

Sanitary Works of the Nation

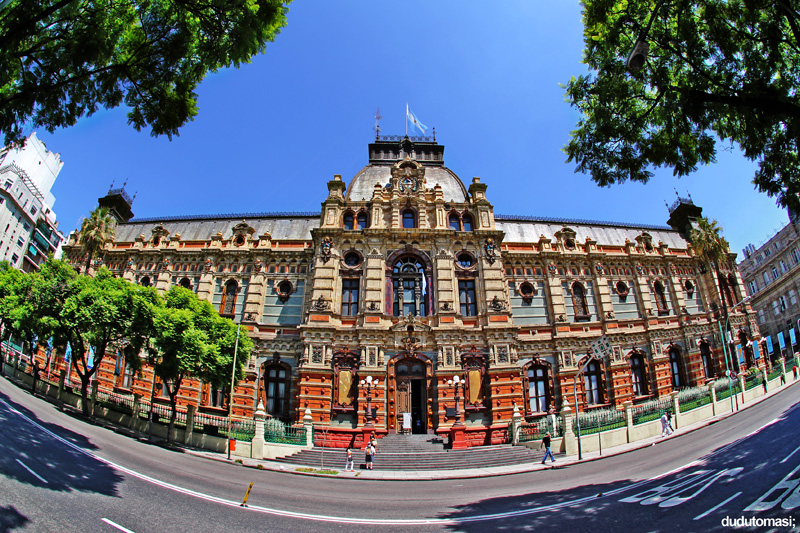
- Palacio de Aguas Corrientes, OSN headquarters
- Native name: Obras Sanitarias de la Nación
- Company type: Public
- Industry: Sanitation
- Founded: 18 July 1912
- Founder: Roque Sáenz Peña
- Defunct: 15 December 1992; 33 years ago
- Fate: Dissolved, assets privatized in 1993 under the Carlos Menem administration
- Successor: Aguas Argentinas (1993–2006); AySA (2006–present)
- Headquarters: Buenos Aires, Argentina
- Area served: Argentina
- Products: Drinking water, sewer service
- Owner: Government of Argentina

Sanitary Works of the Nation (Spanish: Obras Sanitarias de la Nación, abbreviated OSN) was a state-owned company of Argentina dedicated to supplying the public with running water and sewer services. Established in 1912, the company's operation area included mostly the Buenos Aires Province area.

The company had different denominations and was privatized during the presidency of Carlos Menem with influence from the French group Suez, the Spanish company Aguas de Barcelona, and other private groups like Banco Galicia.

== History ==
=== Background ===
In 1824 the government of Buenos Aires, under the administration of Bernardino Rivadavia, took out an international loan from Baring Brothers to build the port of Buenos Aires and the construction of a potable water system in the city. Nevertheless, those works were never carried out.

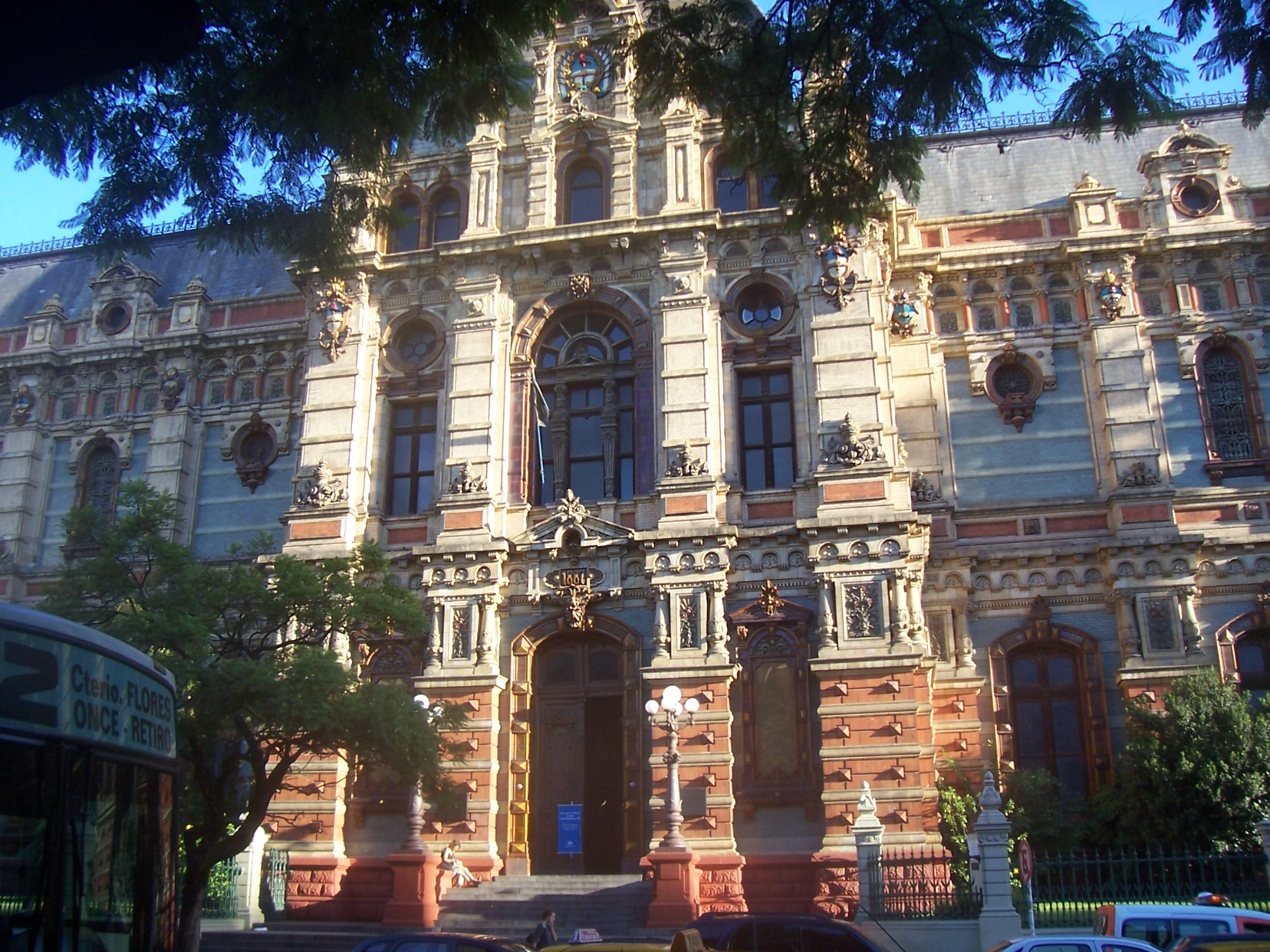
Main facade of the "Palace of Running Water", the main plant and company headquarters in Buenos Aires

The yellow fever epidemic of 1867 caused a huge sanity problem that led the local authorities the need of constructing a structure for wastewater treatment. Therefore, the government committed Irish engineer John Coghlan the project of sanitation of Buenos Aires through the construction of a sewage system. The system run from Recoleta district and consisted of two iron tubes that dig 600 meters deep in Río de la Plata to carry out the water to the sanitation plants. After being purified, the water was sent to city to be distributed.

Works began in 1868 and finished in April 1869. Therefore, Buenos Aires became the first city in América with filters to potabilise water (in the United States it began in 1872). Buenos Aires had 177,000 inhabitants by then. By 1880, the network built by English engineer John Bateman and Irish engineer John Coghlan since 1874, covered most part of the city. The system was based on the British model that they had brought to Argentina. Nevertheless, the population of Buenos Aires increased considerably during the following years, as a result the system was not efficient enough to supply the high demand.

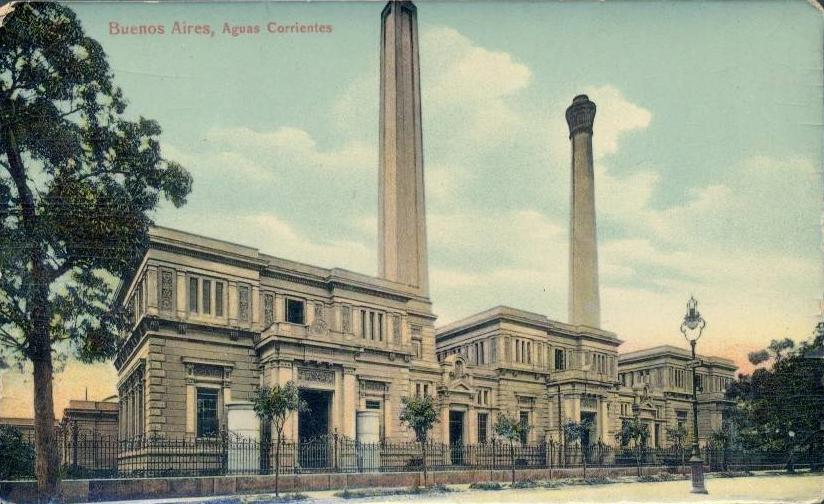
The water pumping building in the Recoleta district. After entering into disuse, it was reformed in the 1930s to place the Museum of Fine Arts there

During the presidency of Domingo Faustino Sarmiento in 1870, with a city that was about to duplicate its population within 20 years, a new project to expand the system was designed, hiring specialised engineer John Frederick Bateman. A new plant was built in Recoleta, where the National Museum of Fine Arts is located nowadays. In 1887, during the Miguel Juárez Celman's administration, the service was privatized, granting concession to British company "Buenos Aires Water Supply". Nevertheless, the contract was cancelled one year later.

The National government took over the service in 1892 through law n° 2,927/1892, also creating the "Comisión de Obras de Salubridad". The method would be also applied in other provinces and cities within Argentina. By 1905, the Bateman's project had finished, with the new plant in Recoleta, a big depot in Avenida Córdoba (known as the Palacio de Aguas Corrientes; lit. "Palace of Running Waters"), tubes network and drinking water distributor, external sewer, works under the Matanza River and five of the biggest storm drain. Nevertheless, by 1908 Buenos Aires had more than 1 million inhabitants, becoming the main commercial center of the country and one of the main cities over the Atlantic Ocean due to the commercial trade with European countries.

=== Obras Sanitarias ===
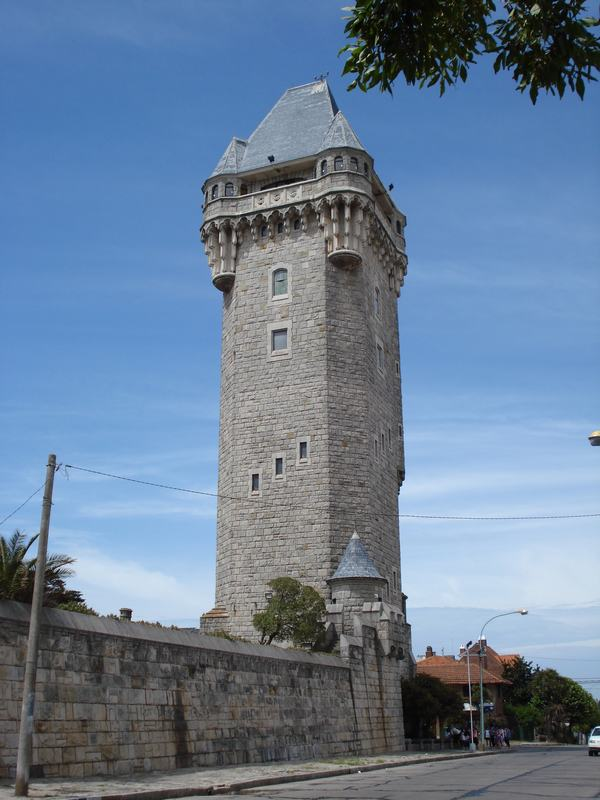
Torre Tanque in Mar del Plata, built by OSN in 1943

On July 18, 1912, "Obras Sanitarias de la Nación" (OSN) was established by Law 8,889 as part of the first Sanitation Plan of 1909 under the presidency of Roque Sáenz Peña. OSN began to expand its area of operation, reaching cities outside Buenos Aires Province. By 1910, 14 capital cities of Argentina had a running water system, with four of them also including sewer system.

New projects include the construction of a new tower and tunnel in the river (finished in 1913), new purification plants in Palermo, new depots in Caballito and Villa Devoto (opened in 1915 and 1917, respectively), the expansion off the main drinking water distributors, the construction of a new sewer, among other works. When the World War I began, Obras Sanitarias had already began works in Buenos Aires and other cities. As a results, works were affected but not interrupted, with materials provided by the Recoleta workshop.

In 1923, engineer Antonio Paitoví was commissioned to expand the network, including the expansion of the Palermo plant, with the aim of providing 500 litres per inhabitant, estimating the population would be 6 million in 1963. The great depression of 1930 affected the estimated time of completion, although works did not stop. The network expanded to its peak in 1940, operating in 14 partidos of Buenos Aires province.

In 1946, the Juan Domingo Perón's administration announced the "Plan Quinquenal", a program of works for the period 1947–51 that include several works to provide water to a large number of cities and towns of Argentina. By those times, OSN had more than 10,000 employees and a plant regarded as one of the biggest in the world. By the end of the decade, OSN had the 85% of the market. In 1955, the company supplied drinking water to 10 million inhabitants, while 4 million had also sewer system.

After Perón was deposed by the Revolución Libertadora in 1955, the investments decreased abruptly, leaving the preventive maintenance behind. From then on, only urgent works were carried out, resulting in a deterioration of the service, also affected by the rampant inflation in the country. Since the 1960s, OSN associated with local cooperative companies that supply services to small cities (less than 50,000 people each), decentralising operations. In 1973, under the Héctor Cámpora administration, a plant was built in General Belgrano to supply areas of the Buenos Aires south region. Works finished in 1975.

In 1980, all the water supply services were transferred to the provinces, with local companies taking care of services. Therefore OSN focused only on Buenos Aires city and 14 districts of Greater Buenos Aires.

=== Privatization ===
The government of Carlos Menem carried out a plan of privatization of state-owned companies –started in 1990 through decree nº 2074/90. Through decree n° 999/92, the rates were increased 74%. Finally OSN was dissolved and fell into a state of liquidation (by decree nº 2394) on December 15, 1992.

On April 18, 1993, the contract of concession was signed between the Argentine state and "Aguas Argentinas S.A.", a corporation group formed by French-owned Suez Environnement, and Spanish Aguas de Barcelona and Banco Galicia, among other companies. The contract set a term of 30 years of concession, with Aguas Argentinas taking over operations since May 10, 1993. then extended during the government of Fernando de la Rúa. The OSN debts were not absorbed by Aguas Argentinas, leaving them to the Argentine state.

== See also ==
- Agua y Saneamientos Argentinos
- Water supply and sanitation in Argentina
- Club Obras Sanitarias
