= Palacio de Aguas Corrientes =

Coordinates: 34°36′02″S 58°23′42″W

Palace of Running Waters
- Palacio de Aguas Corrientes

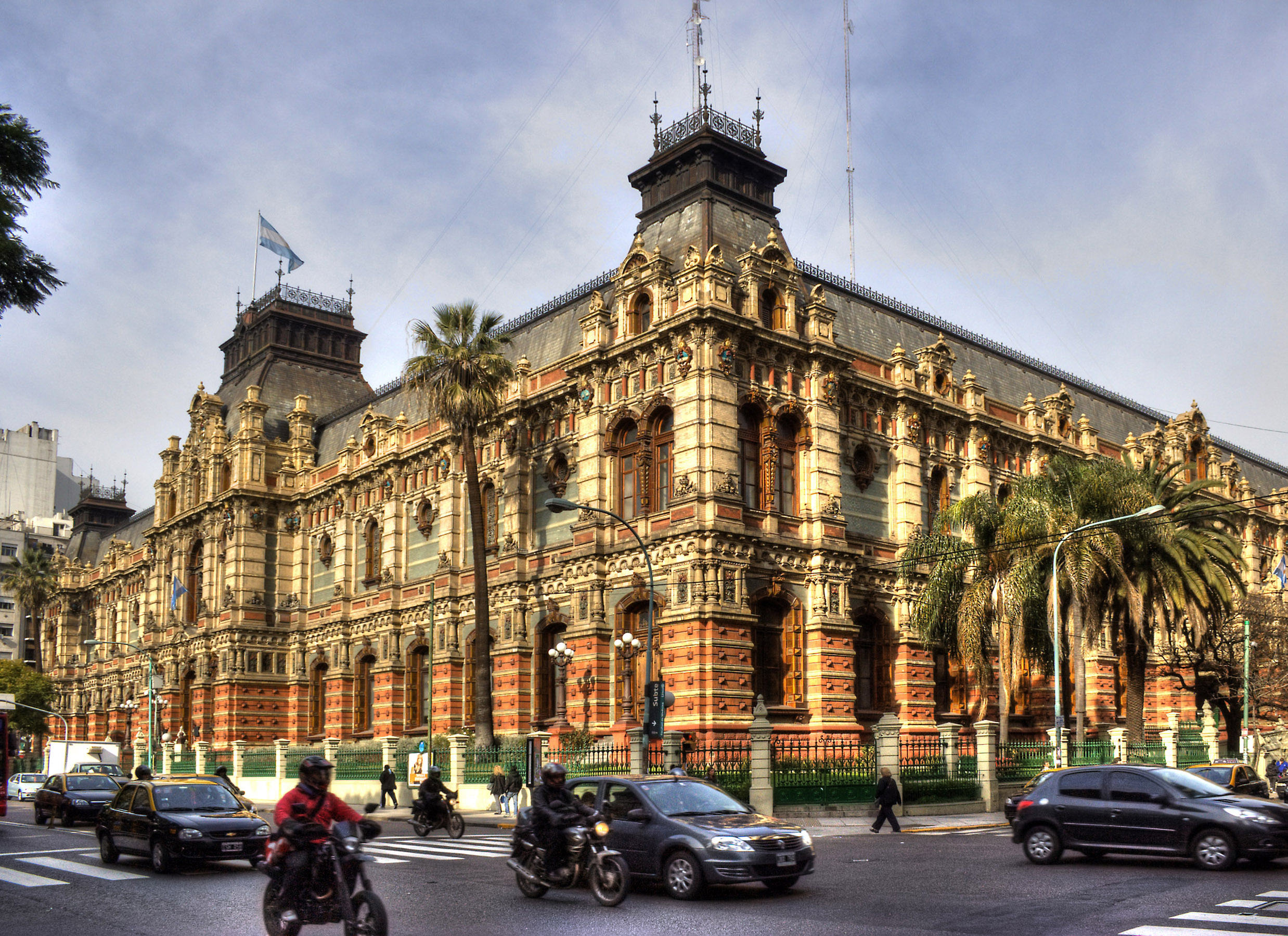
- The building in 2011
- Interactive map of the Palace of Running Waters area

General information
- Type: Palace
- Architectural style: Eclecticism
- Location: Av. Córdoba 1950, Buenos Aires, Argentina
- Year built: 1887
- Opened: 1894; 132 years ago
- Owner: Government of Argentina
- Operator: AySA

Design and construction
- Architect: Olaf Boye

Website
- aysa.com.ar/palacio

National Historic Monument of Argentina
- Designated: 1989

The Palace of Running Waters (Spanish: Palacio de Aguas Corrientes) is an architecturally significant water pumping station in Buenos Aires, Argentina, and the former headquarters of state-owned company Obras Sanitarias de la Nación. It is currently administered by Agua y Saneamientos Argentinos (AySA).

The building, designed and completed in the 19th century, was originally built to host the water tanks. Inaugurated in 1894, the palace is one of the most notable eclectic-style buildings in Argentina. It was declared a National Historic Monument of Argentina in 1989.

== History ==
=== Context ===
The building was commissioned, in part, to replace the unsightly water tower on Lorea Plaza in what today is Congressional Plaza. Occupying a city block at the northern end of the city's Balvanera section, the Córdoba Avenue landmark still functions as a pumping station. The French renaissance palace was covered in over 300,000 glazed, multi-color terra cotta tiles imported from the British ceramics maker Royal Doulton. It features a tin mansard roof and is emblazoned with escutcheons representing the 14 Argentine provinces of the time.

=== Construction ===
The building was designed as a water pumping station in 1877 by the Norwegian architect Olaf Boye, the Swedish engineer Carlos Nyströmer, and the British civil engineer John Baterman (Bateman, Parsons & Bateman). Construction started in 1887. It was inaugurated in 1894.

The building was transferred to the City of Buenos Aires following the 1892 nationalization of the British-owned company.

In 1978, the water pumps were dismantled and the building became a museum.

The company, eventually known as Obras Sanitarias de la Nación (OSN), was reprivatized in 1993 with a 30-year contract. The contract's rescission in 2006 transferred the property to AySA, a state enterprise. The palace still houses a number of AySA offices, Historic Archives and a small water works museum.

== Building ==
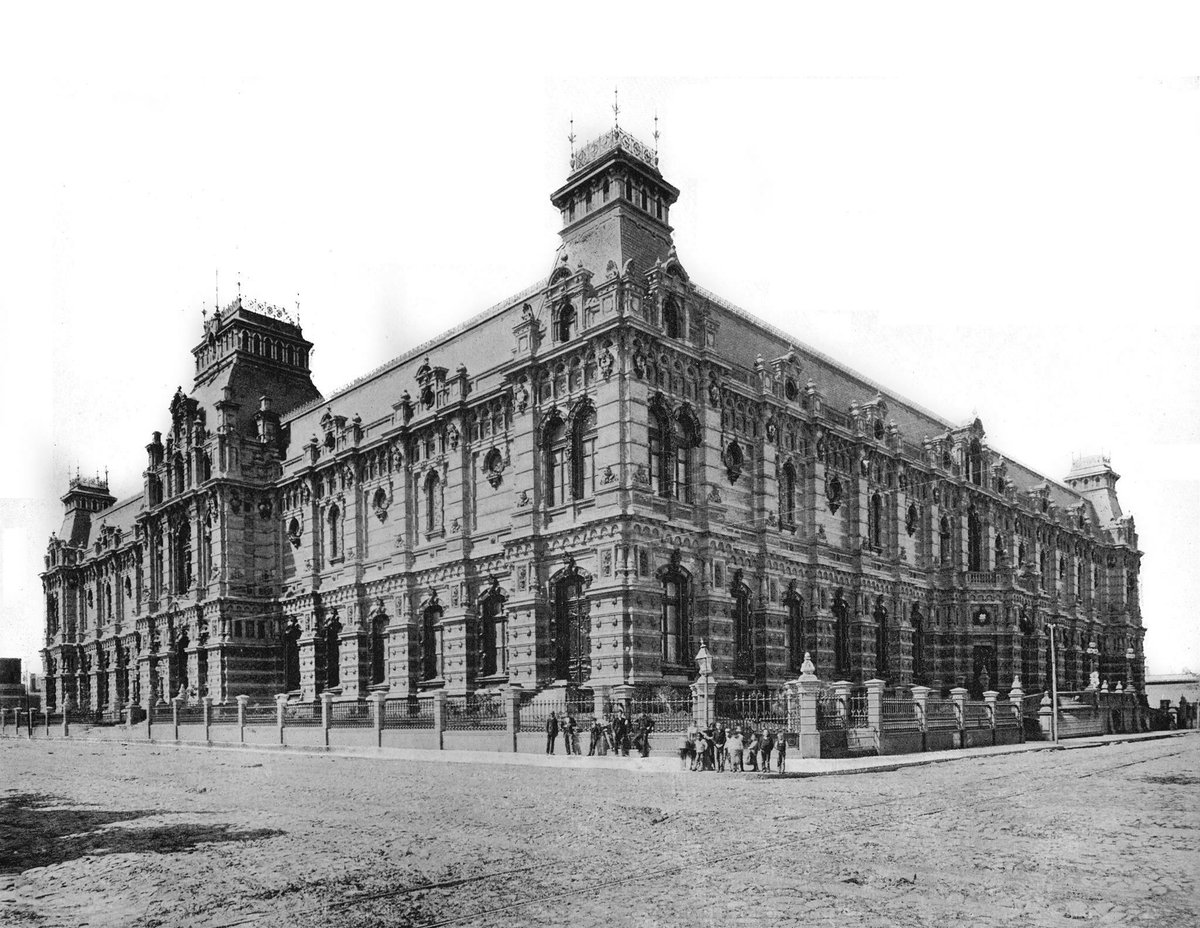
The building soon after being inaugurated.

The building contained twelve water tanks covering three floors and with a 72,000-ton total water capacity. The building is covered with 300,000 majolicas, has an iron structure that was produced in Belgium, and is sustained by 180 columns.

The building's entrance is graced by two caryatids, and the property, by landscaped gardens that includes a bust created by Norwegian sculptor Olaf Boye in honor of engineer Guillermo Villanueva, the first director of the Buenos Aires Water Supply and Drainage Company Limited, the then British-owned municipal water works inaugurated in 1869.

== Archives ==
Established in 1873, this is the only archive containing complete and specific information about emblematic buildings and water supply planning of Buenos Aires. This archive is composed by three main divisions:

- Water Network Supply Archive: Contains plans about water treatment plants, sewage and water network supply, drains and projects (includes type, size and material of pipes, dates, architectural drawings, etc.). The size of the collection is about 60.000 plans, oldest is from 1870, but it is not available to the public.
- Water Connection Application Records: Collection of documents detailing building category, water connection application forms, construction materials, measures, number of pipe connections, names of the owners, ... of almost each building constructed in Buenos Aires. The size of collection is about 350,000 records, but it is not available to the public.
- Plumbing Plans Archive: Plumbing and fire hydrants service plans of 320,000 land lots of Buenos Aires. These plans are crucial for finding water, drain and sewage connections and fixing water leaks. This archive also preserves plans of buildings demolished during the construction of large avenues and highways of Buenos Aires, e.g. 9 de Julio Avenue. The collection has about 2,800,000 plans, the oldest dating from 1889. Access is for authorized individuals only.

== Gallery ==
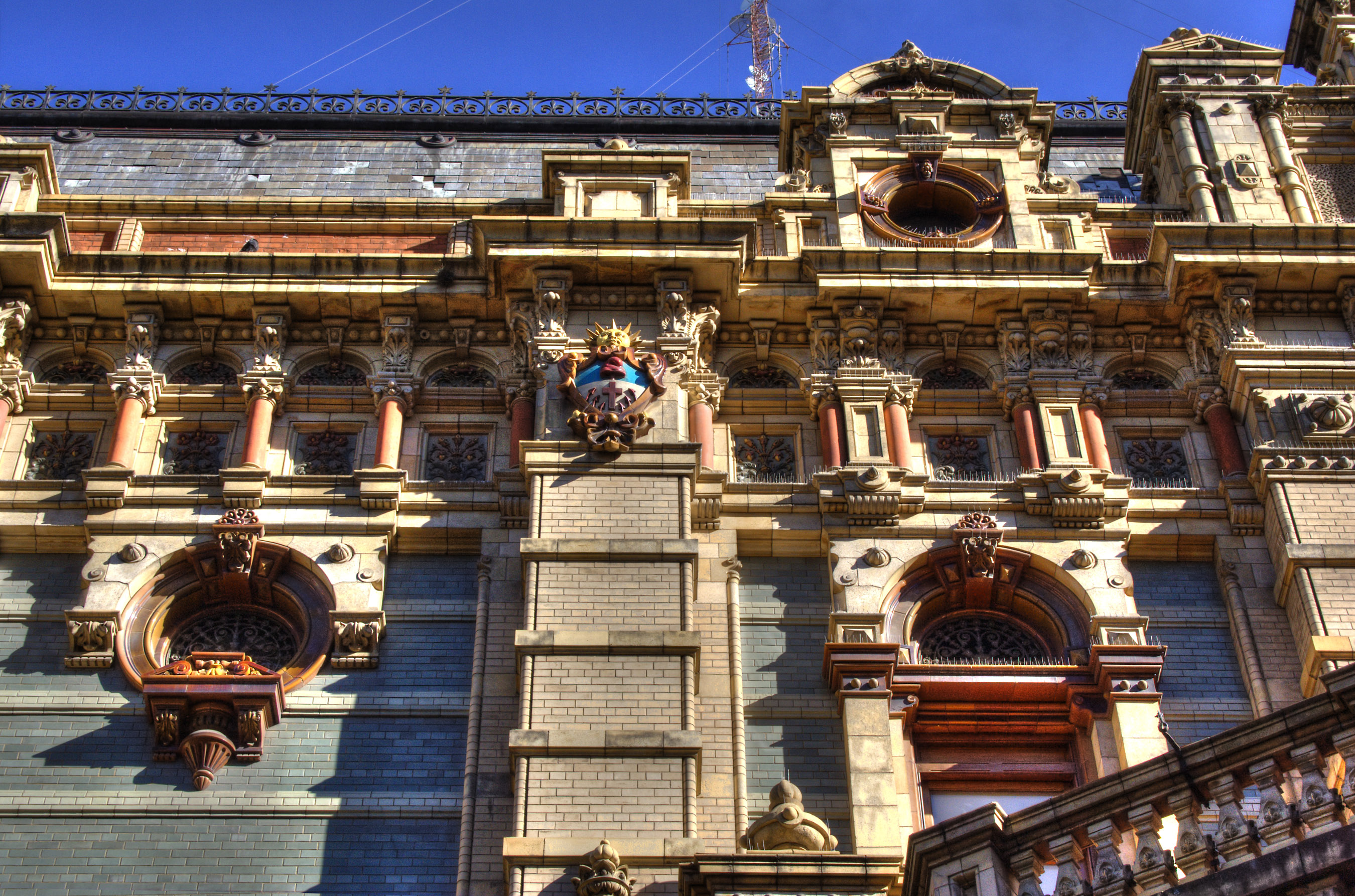
Detail of the exterior facing Riobamba Street

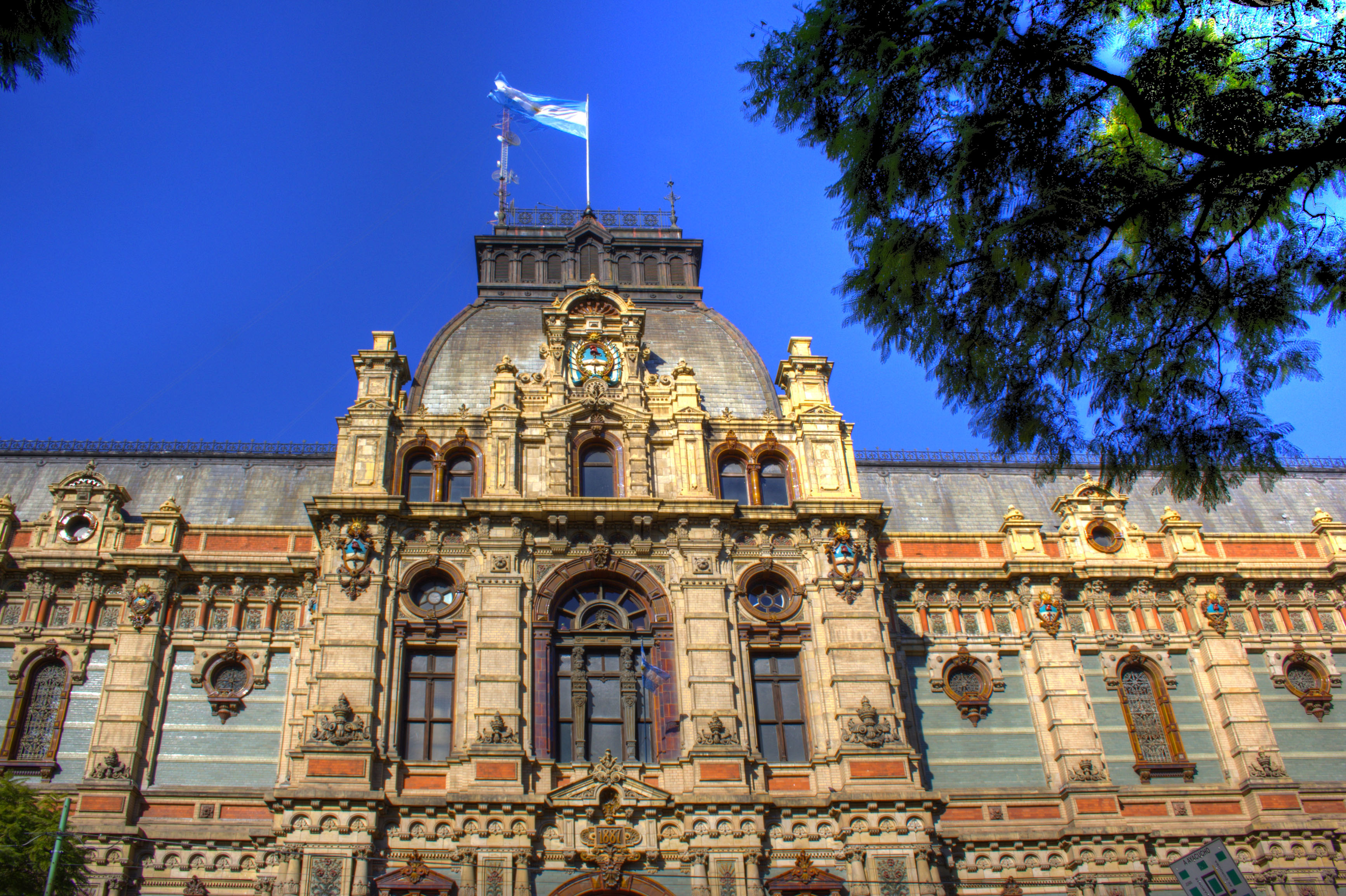
Detail of the main façade

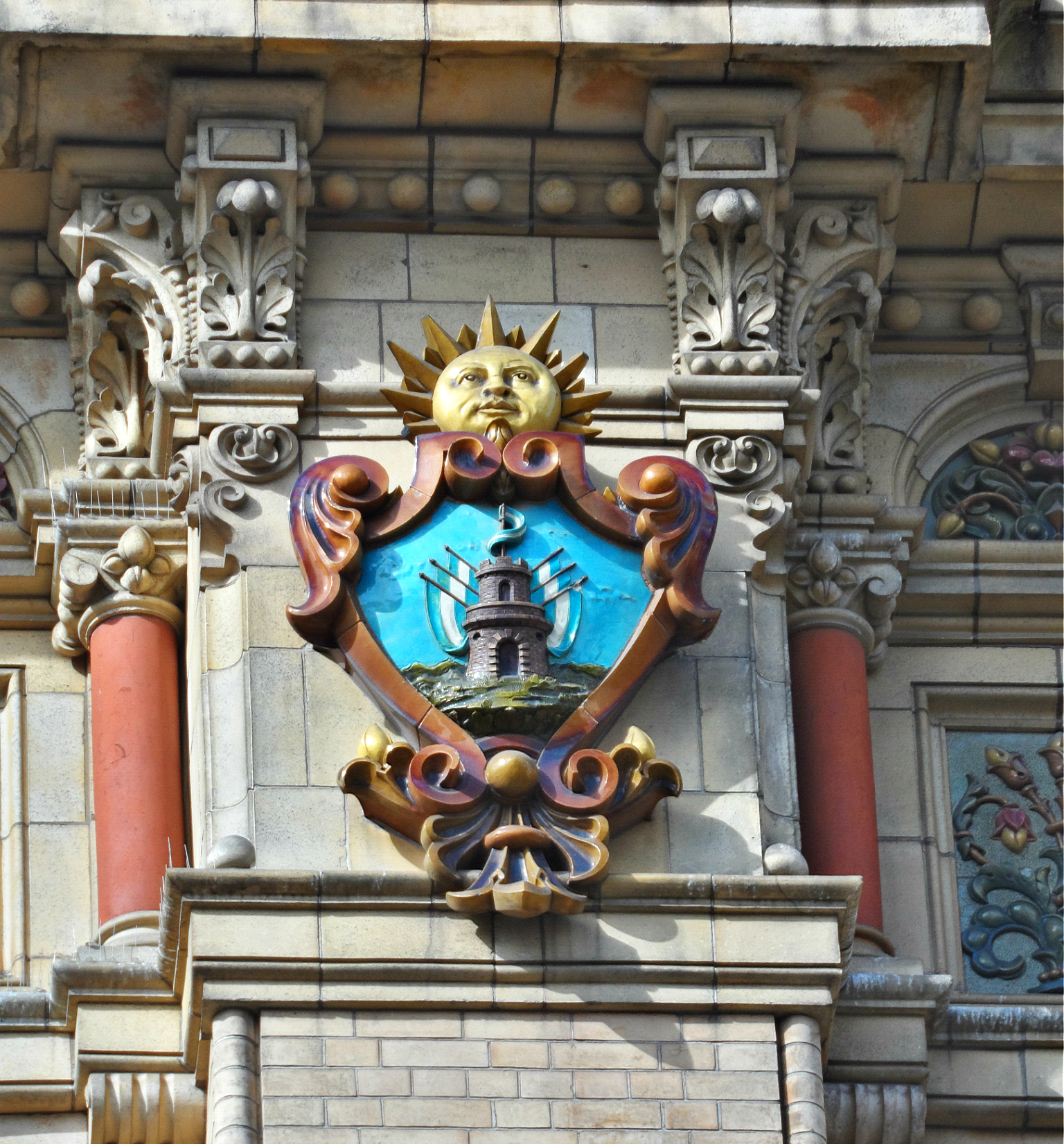
Coat of arms details

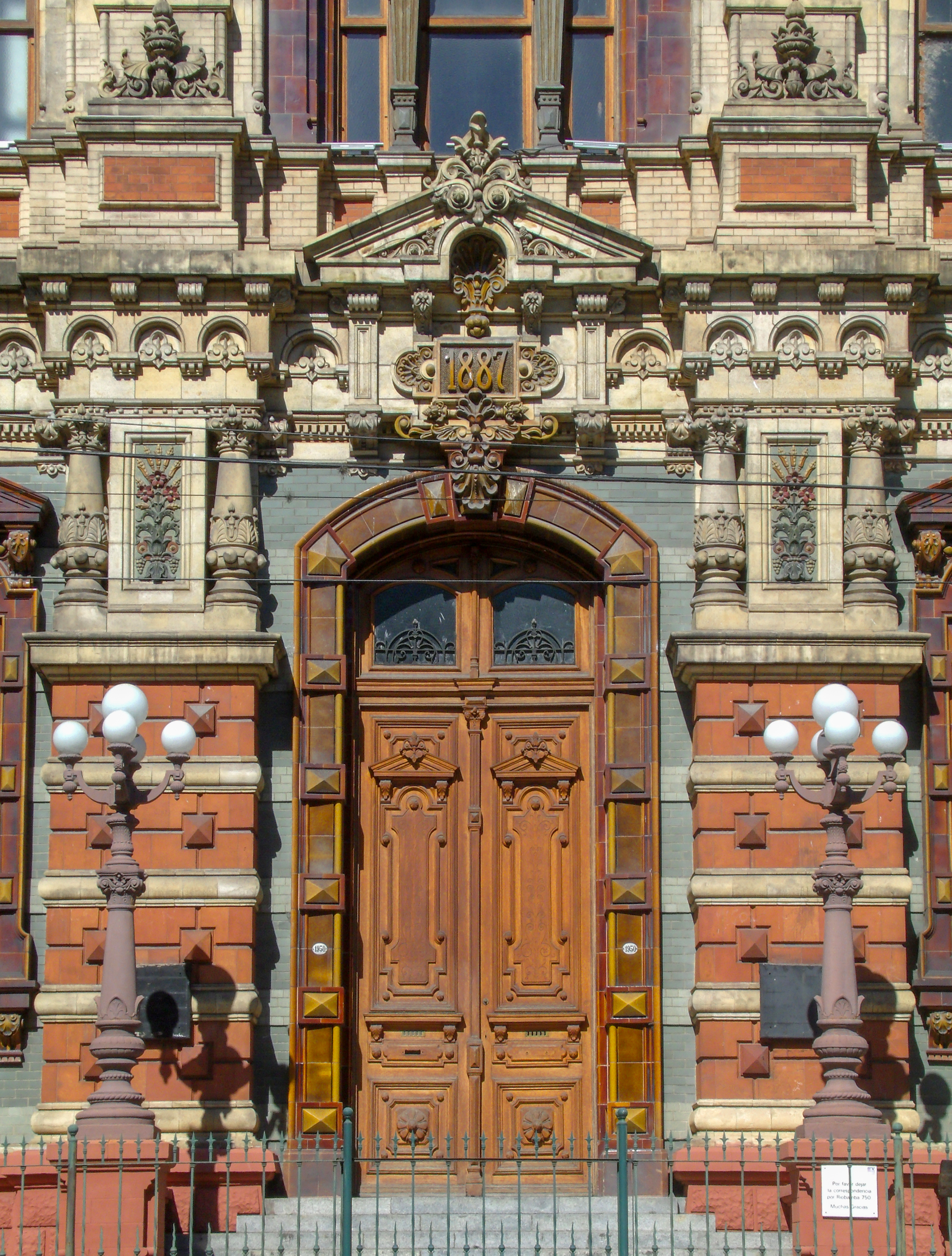
Door details

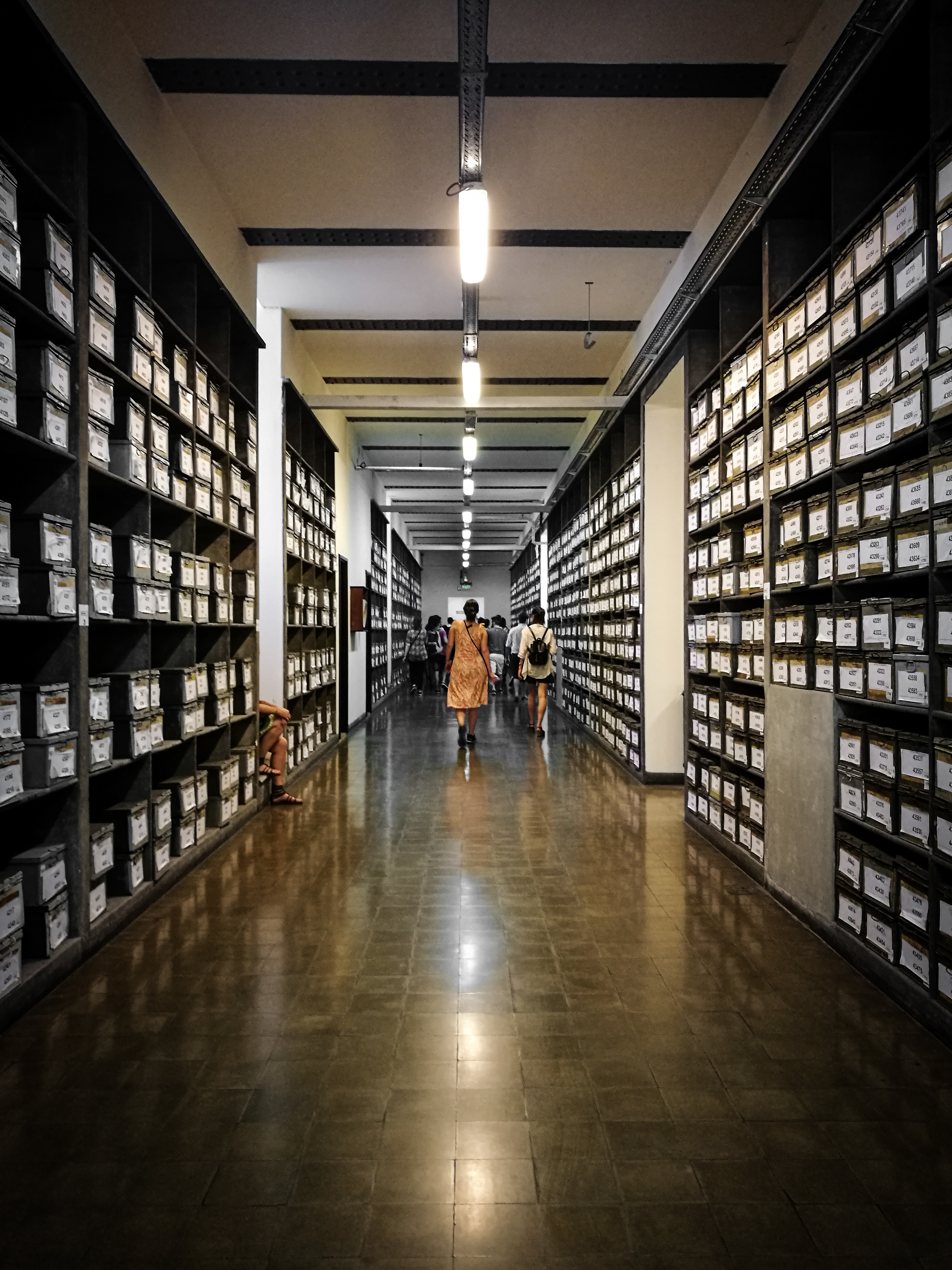
Historic archives

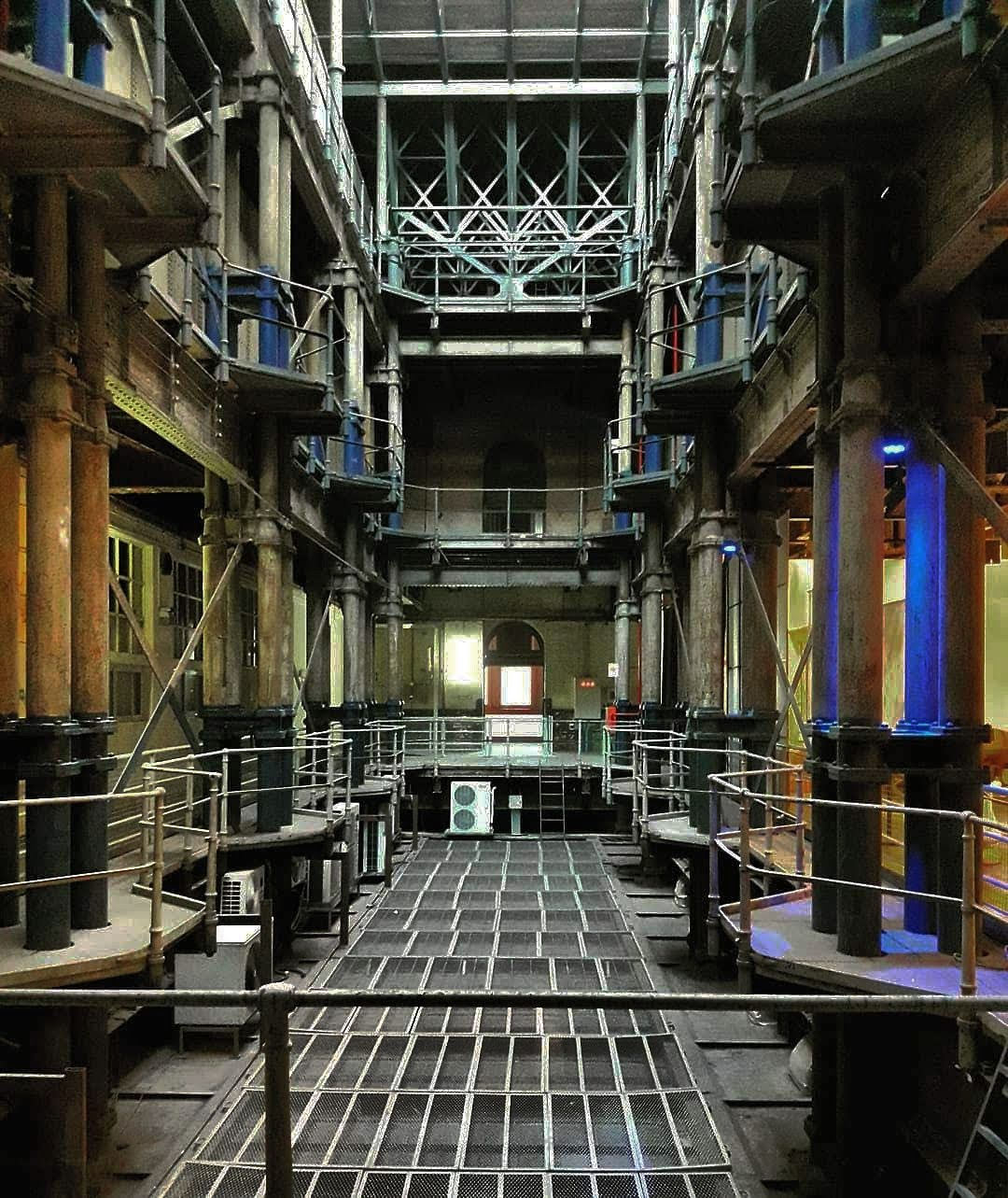
Pipes

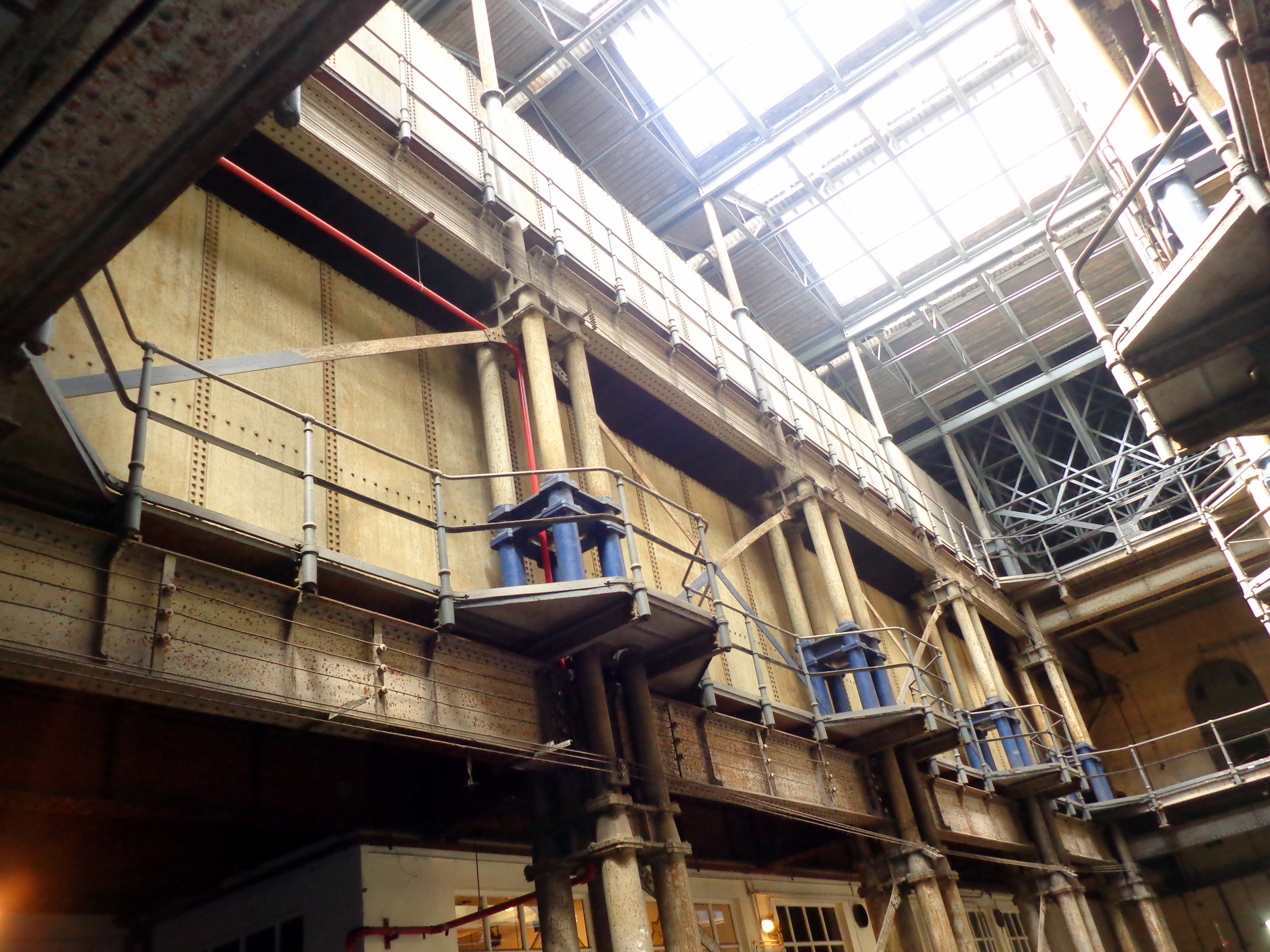
Pipes

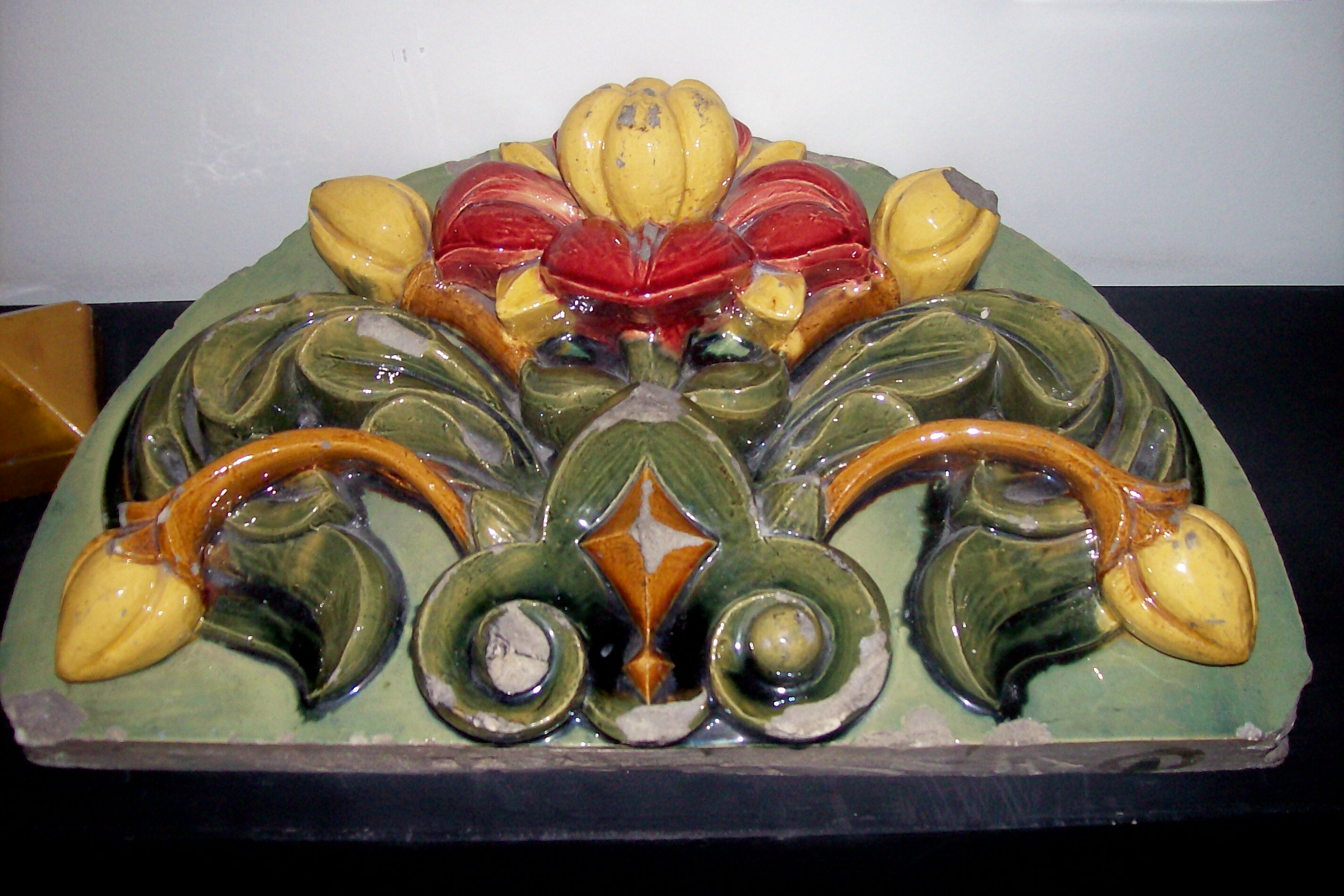
Ceramic at the museum

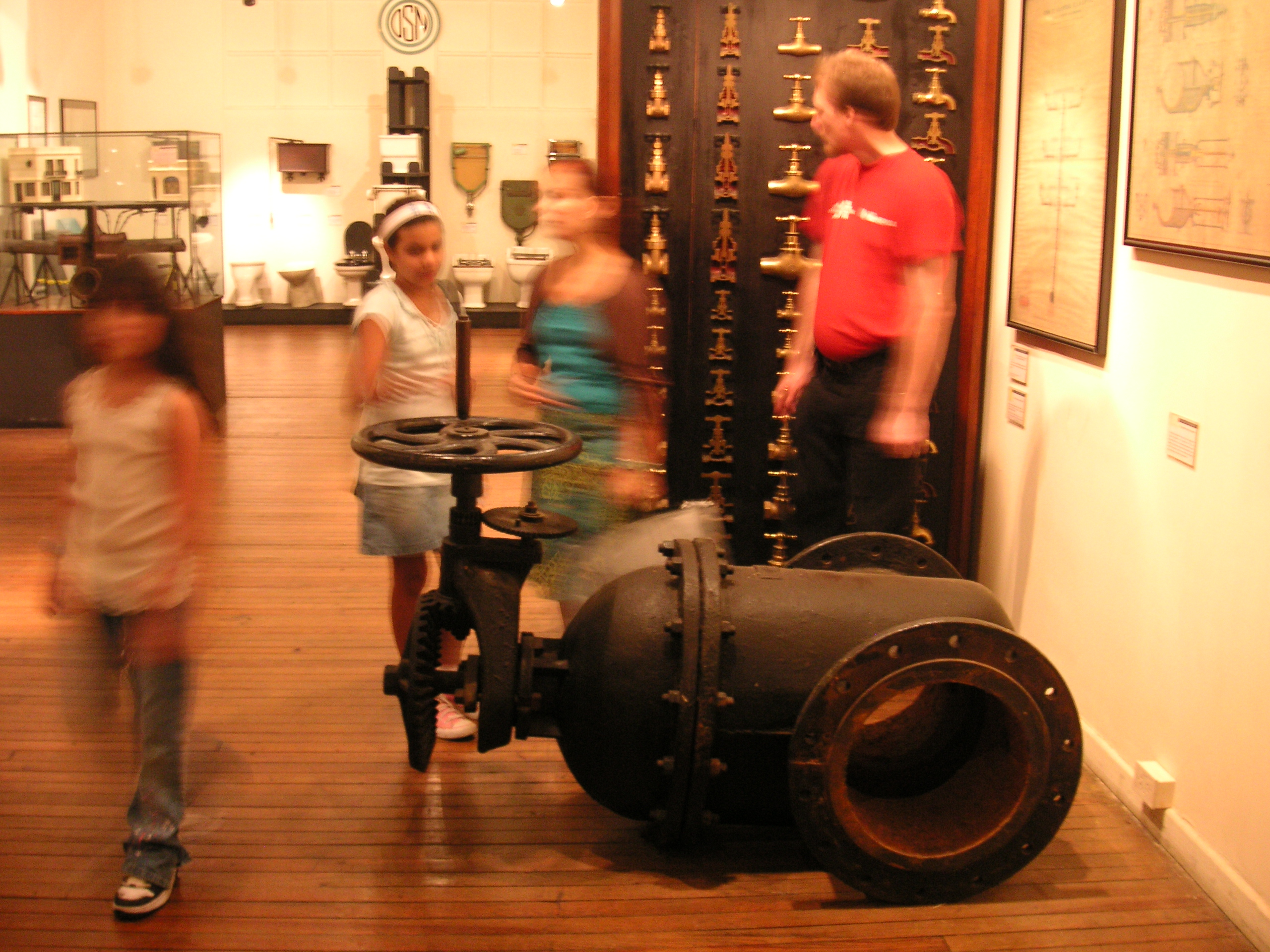
Building's museum

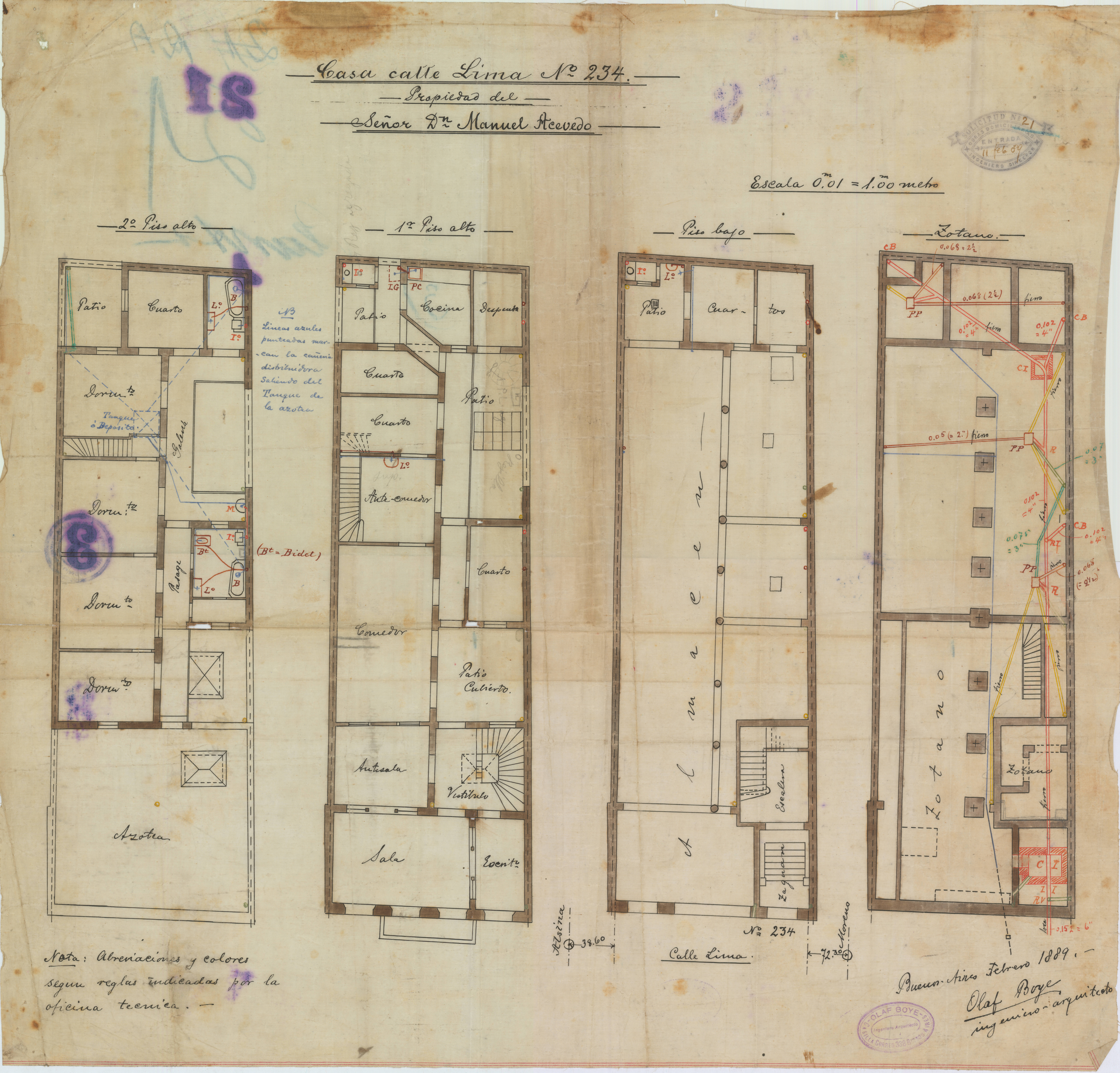
Historic plumbing plan

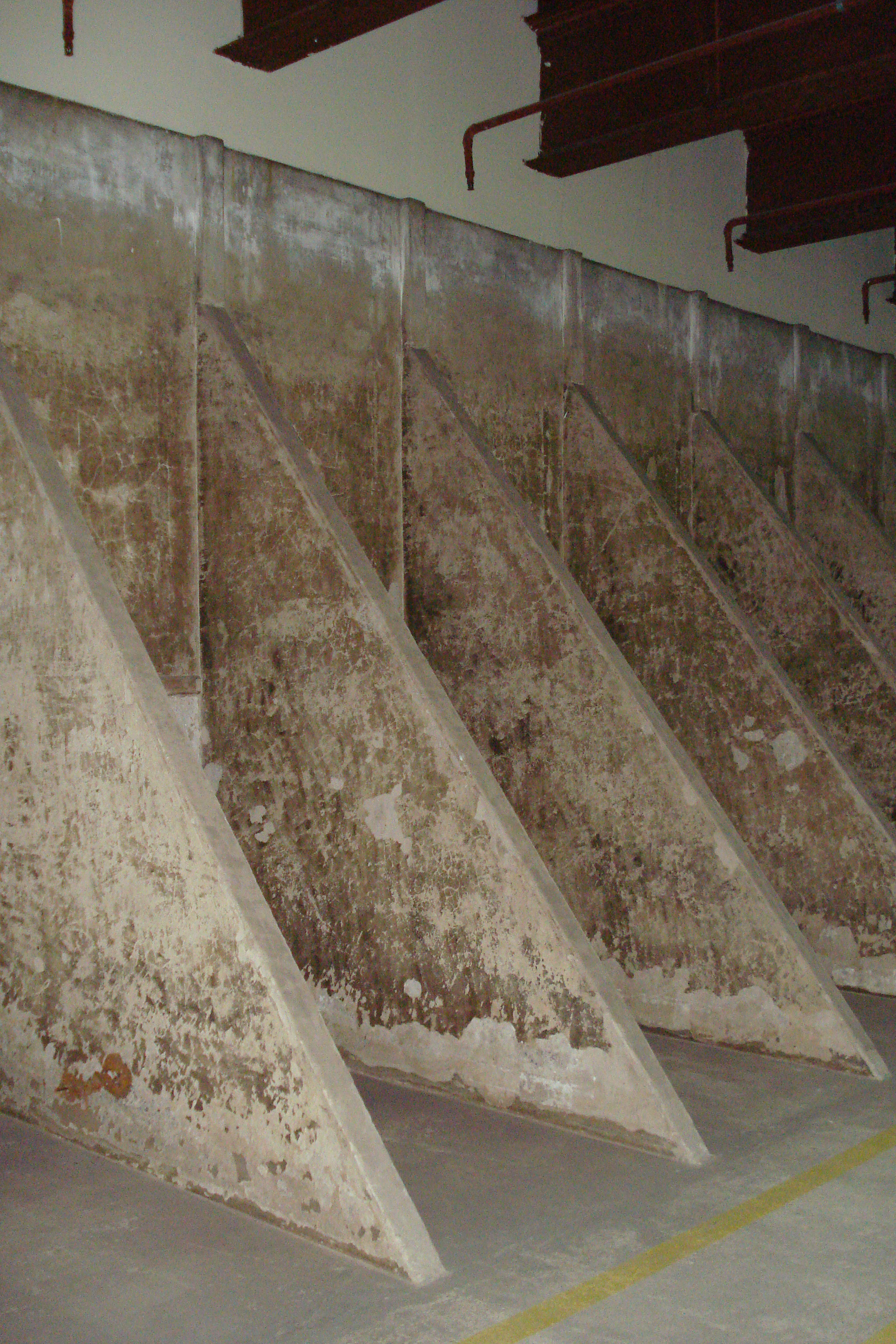
Former water reservoir

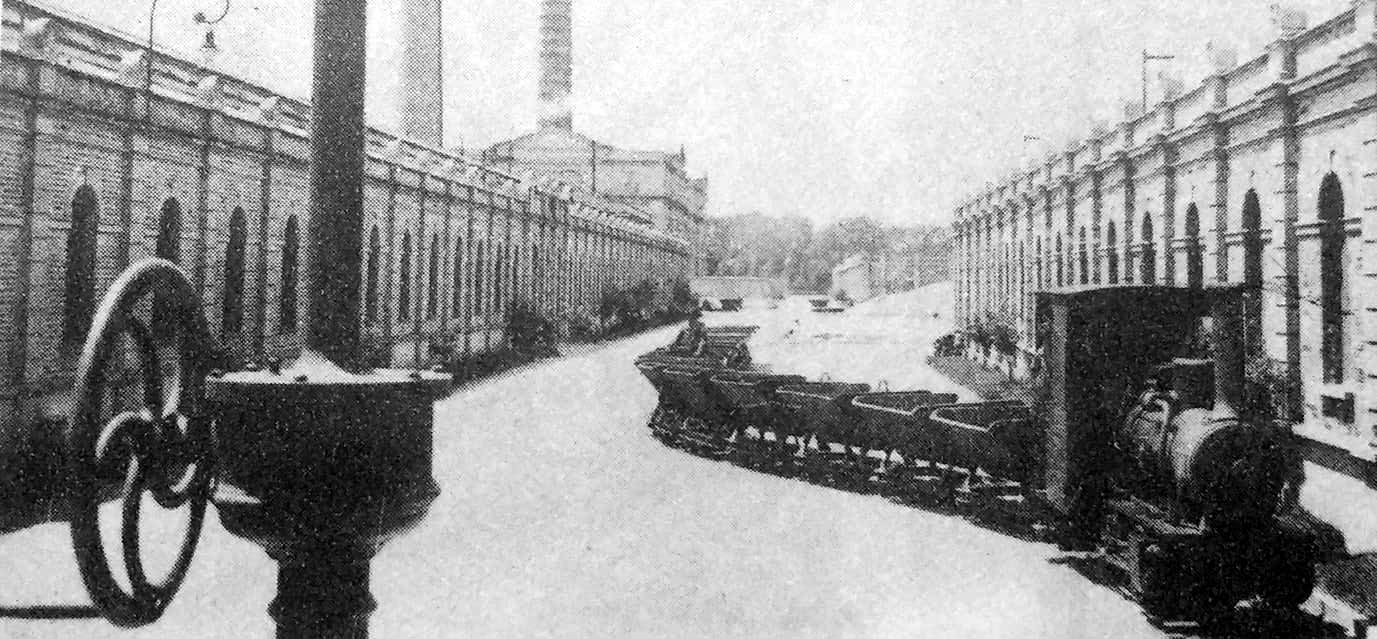
Train in the interior c. 1925

== In the popular culture ==
The building figures prominently in the book Santa Evita by Tomas Eloy Martinez.
