= Agua y Saneamientos Argentinos =

Argentine Water and Sanitation S.A.

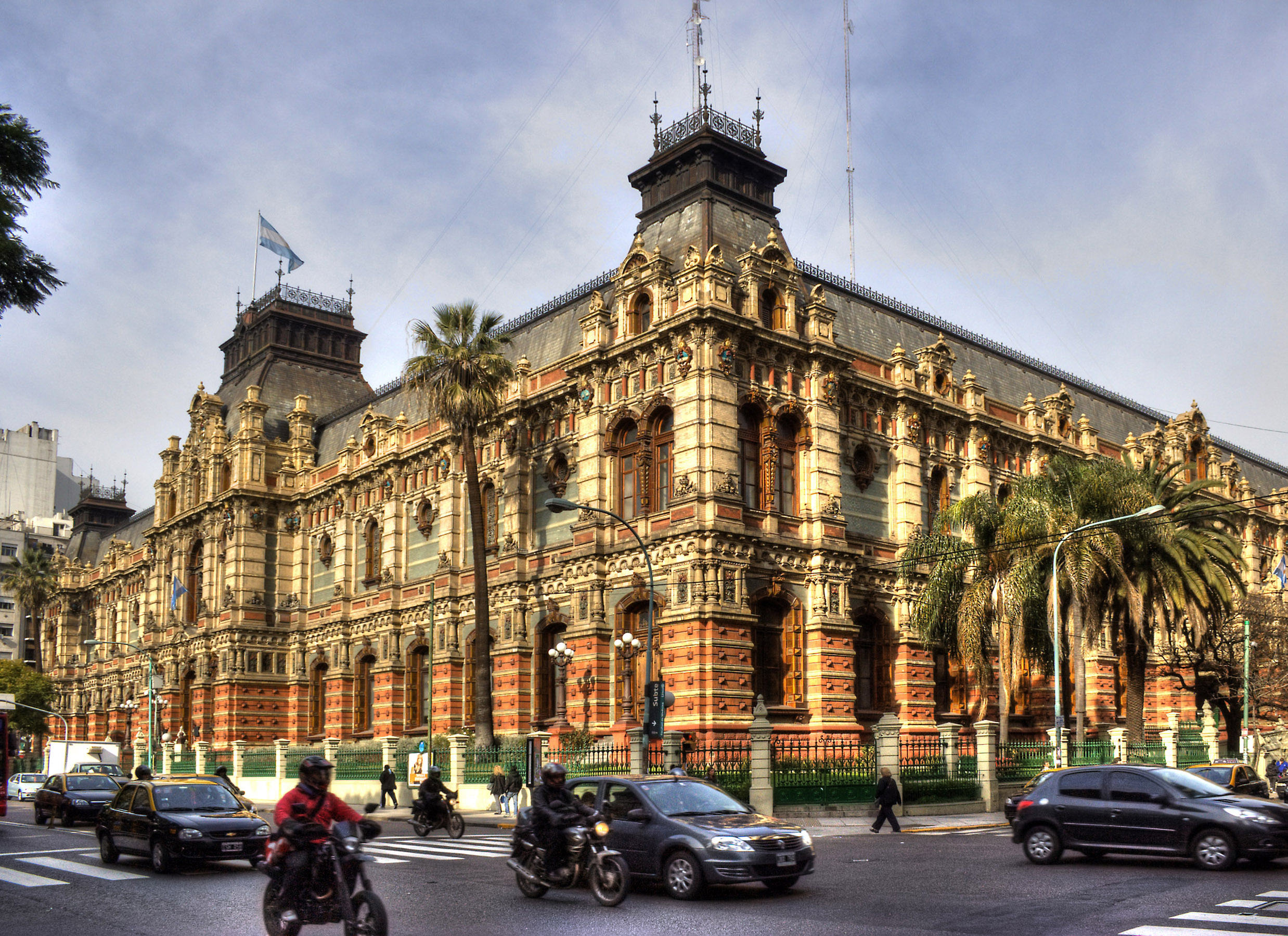
- Palacio de Aguas Corrientes, Aysa main building
- Native name: Agua y Saneamientos Argentinos S.A.
- Company type: S.A.
- Industry: Sanitation
- Predecessor: Obras Sanitarias (1912–1993); Aguas Argentinas (1993–2006)
- Founded: March 2006; 19 years ago
- Founder: Néstor Kirchner
- Headquarters: Buenos Aires, Argentina
- Area served: Buenos Aires autonomous city Greater Buenos Aires
- Key people: Oscar Ferrari (President)
- Products: Drinking water, sewer service
- Owner: Government of Argentina
- Number of employees: 8,000 (2022)
- Parent: Ministry of Interior
- Website: aysa.com.ar

Argentine Water and Sanitation (Spanish: Agua y Saneamientos Argentinos, mostly known for its acronym AySA) is a state-owned company of Argentina dedicated to supplying the public with running water and sewer services. Created in 2006 after the Government of Argentina rescinded the contract with "Aguas Argentinas", a corporate group that had granted concession during the Carlos Menem's administration in the 1990s. This way, 90% of the company remained under the control of the Ministry of the Interior, Public Works and Housing, later falling into the jurisdiction of the Ministry of Public Works when it was reformed back into its own ministerial portfolio.

AySA's operation area includes the Buenos Aires autonomous city and 25 partidos of Greater Buenos Aires. As of May 2022, the company had 8,000 employees.

== History ==
=== Background ===
In 1824 the government of Buenos Aires, under the administration of Bernardino Rivadavia, took out an international loan from Baring Brothers to build the port of Buenos Aires and the construction of a potable water system in the city. Nevertheless, those works were never carried out.

On July 18, 1912, "Obras Sanitarias de la Nación" (OSN) was established by Law 8,889 as part of the first Sanitation Plan of 1909 under the presidency of Roque Sáenz Peña. OSN began to expand its area of operation, reaching cities outside Buenos Aires Province. By 1910, 14 capital cities of Argentina had a running water system, with four of them also including sewer system.

After Perón was deposed by the Revolución Libertadora in 1955, the investments decreased abruptly, leaving the preventive maintenance behind. From then on, only urgent works were carried out, resulting in a deterioration of the service, also affected by the rampant inflation in the country. Since the 1960s, OSN associated with local cooperative companies that supply services to small cities (less than 50,000 people each), decentralising operations. In 1973, under the Héctor Cámpora administration, a plant was built in General Belgrano to supply areas of the Buenos Aires south region. Works finished in 1975.

In 1980, all the water services were transferred to the provinces, with Obras Sanitarias focusing only in Buenos Aires.

=== Privatization ===
The government of Carlos Menem carried out a plan of privatization that included OSN, granting concession to "Aguas Argentinas", a corporation group formed by French-owned Suez Environnement, and Spanish Aguas de Barcelona and Banco Galicia. The contract set a term of 20 years of concession, then extended during the government of Fernando de la Rúa.

The OSN debts were not absorbed by Aguas Argentinas, leaving them to the Argentine state. OSN was dissolved in August. Through decree n° 999/92, the rates were increased 74%. The service quality decreased in several cities of Greater Buenos Aires, with no new investments from the company. Maintenance works ceased in order to save costs. From May 1993 to January 2002, rates for residential user increased 88%.

After the 2001 economic crisis, the company suspended payments to suppliers, with USD 57 million debts in payment to suppliers and 102 million in debts to the Argentine state, plus AR$ 97 million in unpaid debts.

=== Concession revoked and nationalization ===
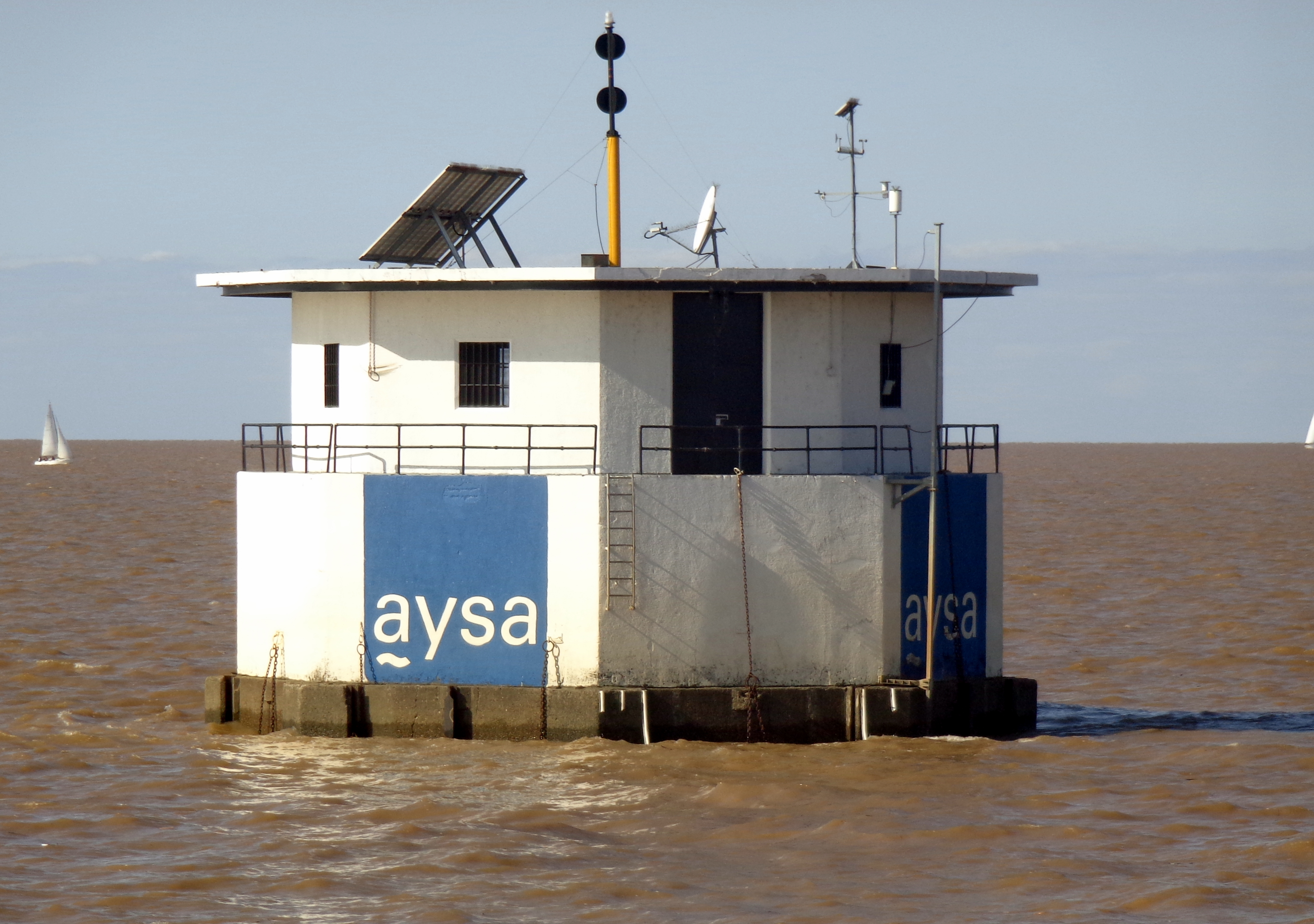
River intake structure in Buenos Aires

According to a study by the Auditor General of Argentina, only 12% of the water was treated by Aguas Argentinas, with the rest poured to the river in Berazategui district. After having found fraudulent invoices for non-existent works carried out and false addresses given, the contract was revoked by the Néstor Kirchner administration in March 2006.

As a result, the 90% of the company became state-owned, with a 10% handed by its employees. By 2015, sewerage system reached 7,207,546 people.

In 2019, Malena Galmarini was appointed president of AySA, becoming the first woman to preside over the company.

== See also ==
- Water supply and sanitation in Argentina
- Water privatization in Argentina
