= Avenida Córdoba =

Street in Buenos Aires, Argentina

Coordinates: 34°35′53″S 58°24′27″W

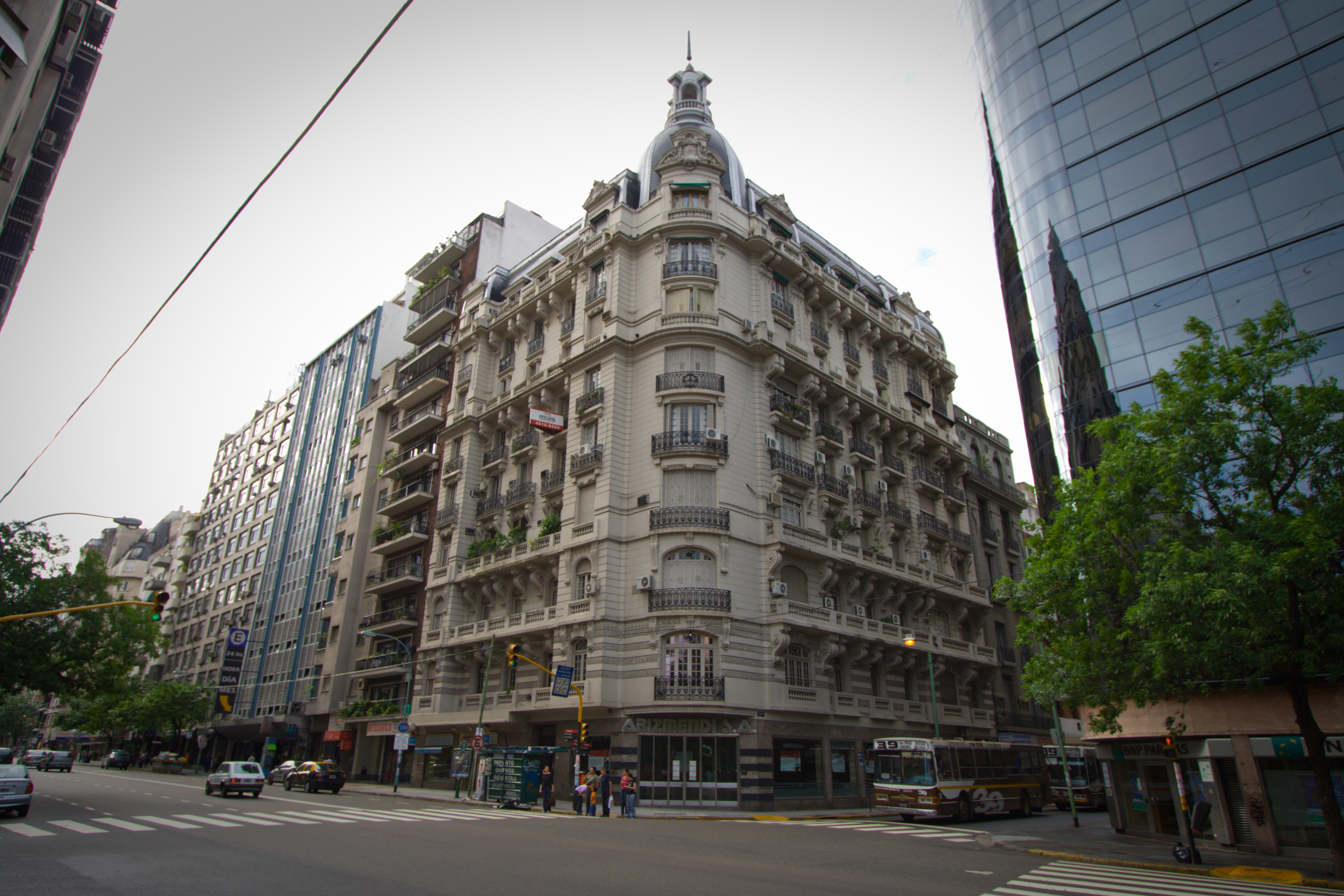
Córdoba Avenue

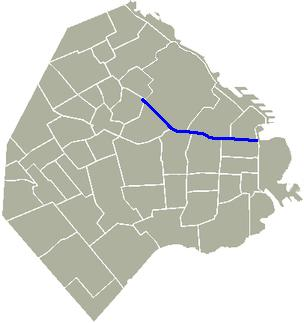
Location of Córdoba Avenue in Buenos Aires.

Córdoba Avenue is one of the principal thoroughfares in Buenos Aires, Argentina.

== History ==
Mayor Torcuato de Alvear, inspired by the urban redevelopment works in Paris at the hand of Baron Haussmann, drew up master plans for major boulevards, running east to west, every six blocks. During the 1880s, Córdoba Avenue was included in the plan and widened. The Buenos Aires Metro authority at the time, operated by the Spanish-Argentine concern CHADOPyF, built Line largely under Córdoba Avenue during the 1930s. Following the popularization of the automobile in Argentina during the 1960s, a 1967 ordinance made the avenue a one-way thoroughfare, east to west (making Córdoba Avenue one of the major routes used by the city's evening commuters).

== Overview ==
The avenue's outset at Eduardo Madero Avenue is the continuation of Cecilia Grierson Street in Puerto Madero. Past this point, Córdoba Av. enters downtown Buenos Aires and passes along the northern end of the financial district. Microsoft's Latin American headquarters, opened in 2000, and the 42-story Alas building are located on this corner; the Alas building, built in the early 1950s by the administration of Juan Perón for the Argentine Air Force, was the tallest in Argentina until 1995. Past Leandro Alem Avenue (the city's original shoreline), the avenue climbs around 15 m (50 ft) in a block-long segment known as "el bajo" - an incline where the riverfront once was. The Lancaster Hotel, located at the top of the incline, is where writer Graham Greene stayed in Buenos Aires while writing his celebrated mystery, The Honorary Consul.

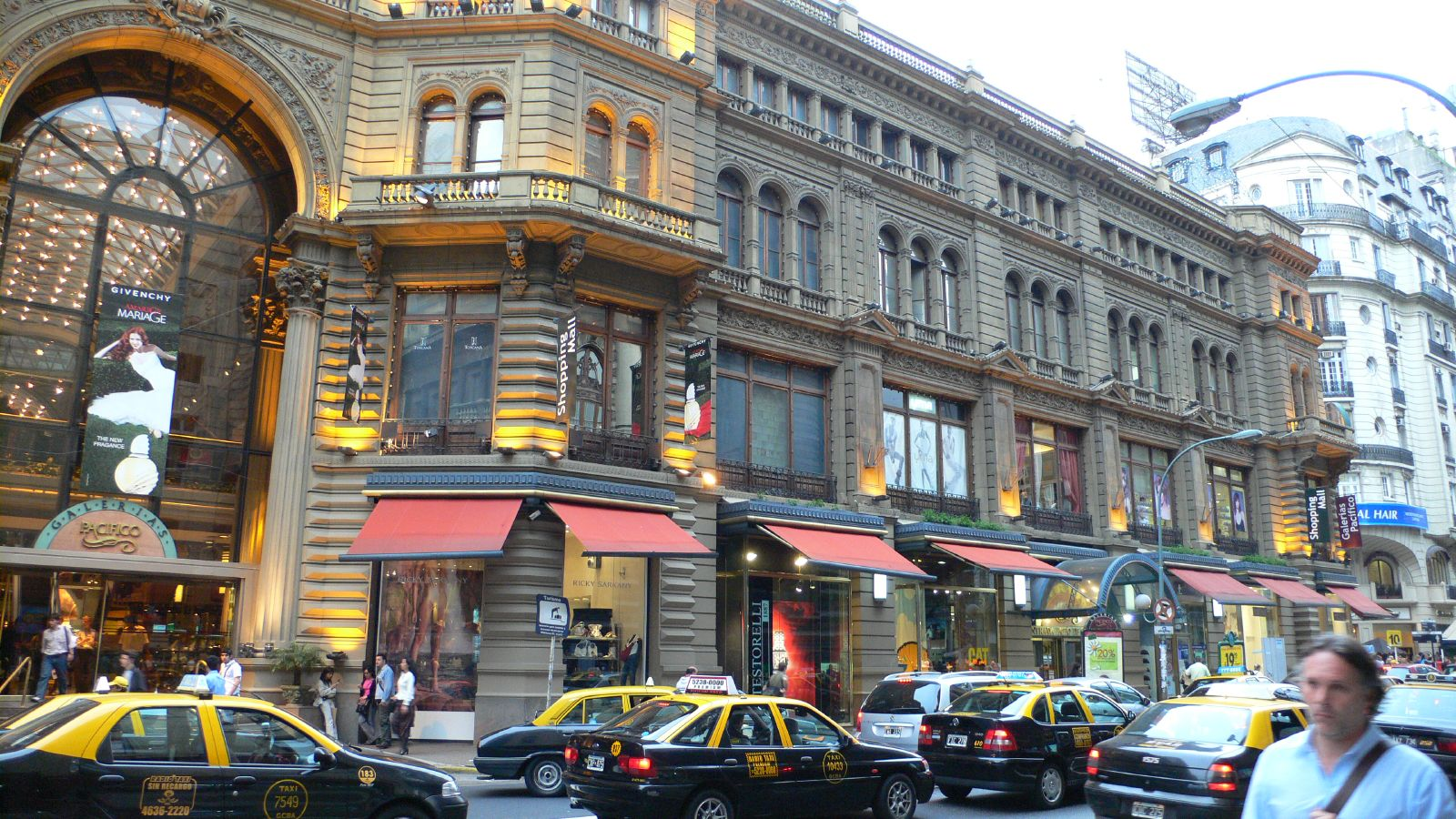
The avenue along the Galerías Pacífico shopping centre

The avenue crosses pedestrianized Florida Street a few blocks on. The southeast corner of this intersection is known for the Galerías Pacífico shopping arcade, housed in ornate structure occupying a city block and built in 1889 as the Buenos Aires affiliate of Paris' renowned Bon Marché. The eclectic Beaux-Arts structure is complemented by the Naval Officers' Association building, on the intersection's northeast corner; adjacent to the latter building is Harrods Buenos Aires, currently undergoing renovations. Writer Jorge Luis Borges frequented the Café St. James nearby (at Córdoba and Maipú), where he held his lectures on English literature during the 1950s and 1960s. One block west is the eclecticist Bencich Building, known for its tapered red cupola. Buenos Aires' Nueve de Julio Avenue (one of the world's widest) was extended northwards past Córdoba Avenue in the 1950s, and the intersection of the two avenues was graced by the placement of two fountains originally located at the Plaza de Mayo. Italian automaker FIAT opened the Mirafiori Tower, its Argentine headquarters, at this intersection in 1964.

Its intersection with Libertad Street (one block past Nueve de Julio) is distinguished by Plaza Lavalle, the Cervantes Theatre and the Libertad Street Temple, the most important synagogue in Buenos Aires (home to the largest Jewish community in Latin America). Further west, the avenue passes by the Palacio de Aguas Corrientes, an ornate water pumping station completed in 1894; the effect of rainfall on the building's porcelain tile exterior is an attraction to many, in itself. The Neo-classical Sáenz Peña Teachers' School is across the avenue. Córdoba Avenue is home to a concentration of University of Buenos Aires schools, as well. The Faculty of Medicine and its Hospital de Clínicas are across the avenue from the Faculty of Economics, and all are a block east of the Neo-Gothic National Music Conservatory. Entering the historic Jewish district of Buenos Aires, the avenue's intersection with Pasteur Street lies one block north of the Jewish Argentine Mutual Association, whose original building was destroyed in an as-yet-unsolved 1994 terrorist attack (the worst ever in Argentine history).

The 8 km (5 mi) avenue demarcates a number of Buenos Aires' boroughs. At its outset, it separates Retiro to the north from San Nicolás and, further west, from Balvanera. It then separates Balvanera from Recoleta, to the north and, further west, Palermo from Almagro and Villa Crespo (both to Palermo's south). Entering Villa Crespo, the avenue passes under Reconquista Bridge, an overpass opened in 1969 to facilitate traffic along Juan B. Justo Avenue. Córdoba Avenue's Villa Crespo section is known for its many apparel and footwear stores. The avenue ends as such at Federico Lacroze Avenue, though geographically it continues as Giribone Street for another eight blocks, extending well into the Chacarita borough.

Avenida Córdoba
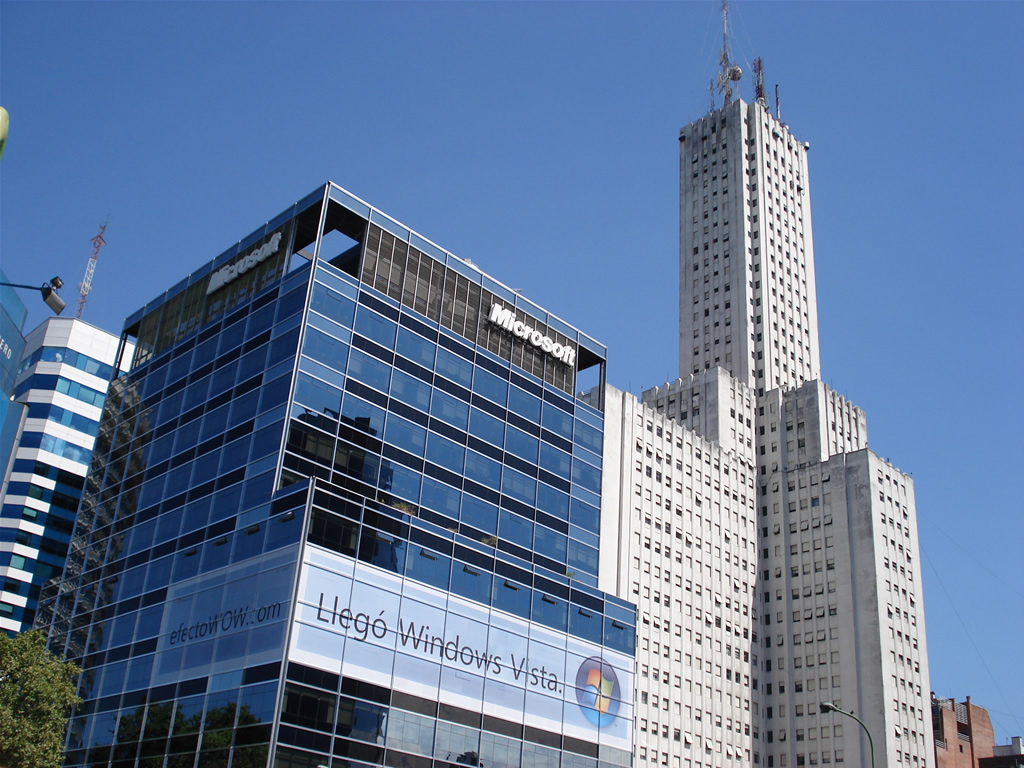
Microsoft and Alas buildings

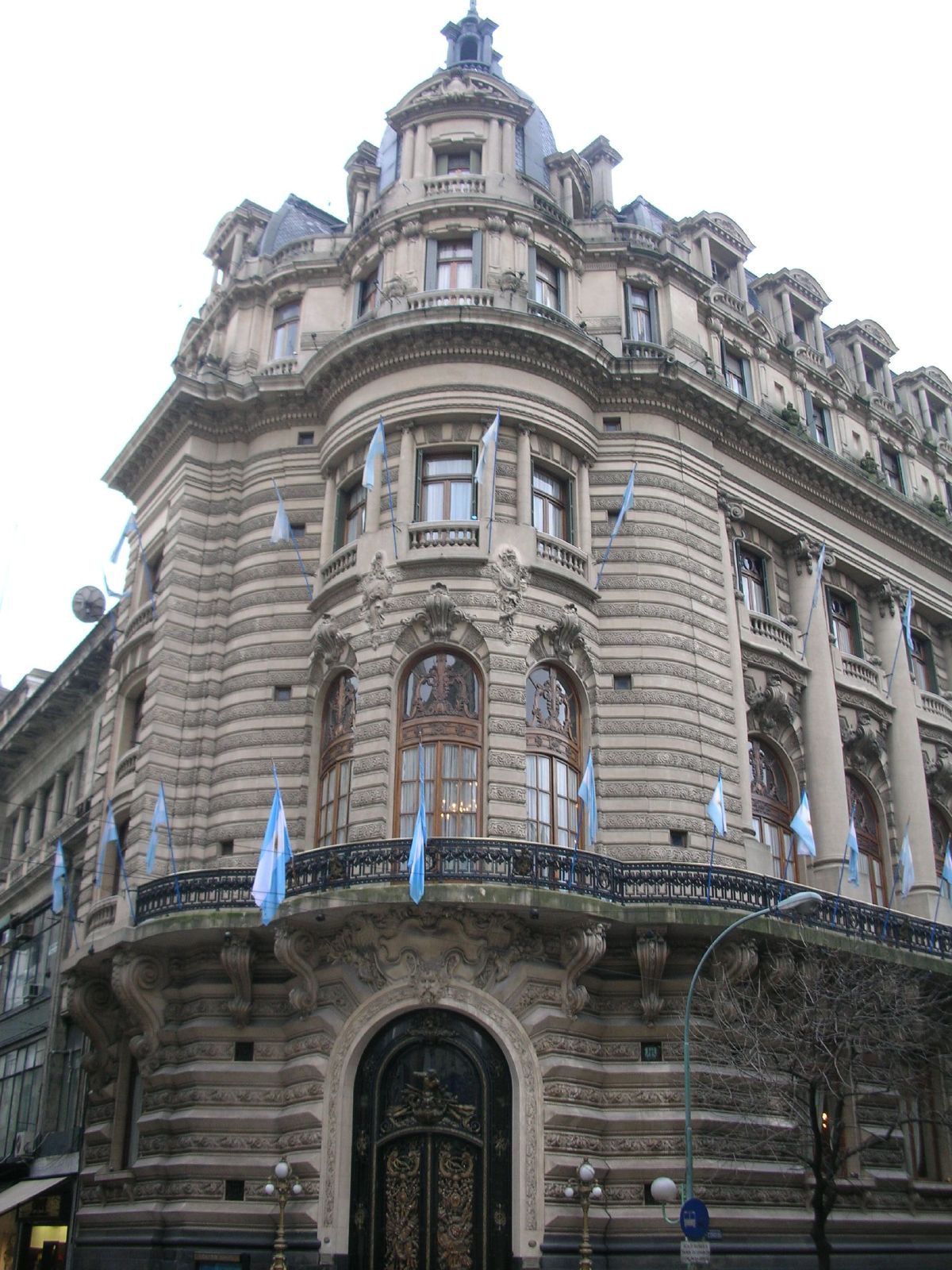
Naval Officers' Association

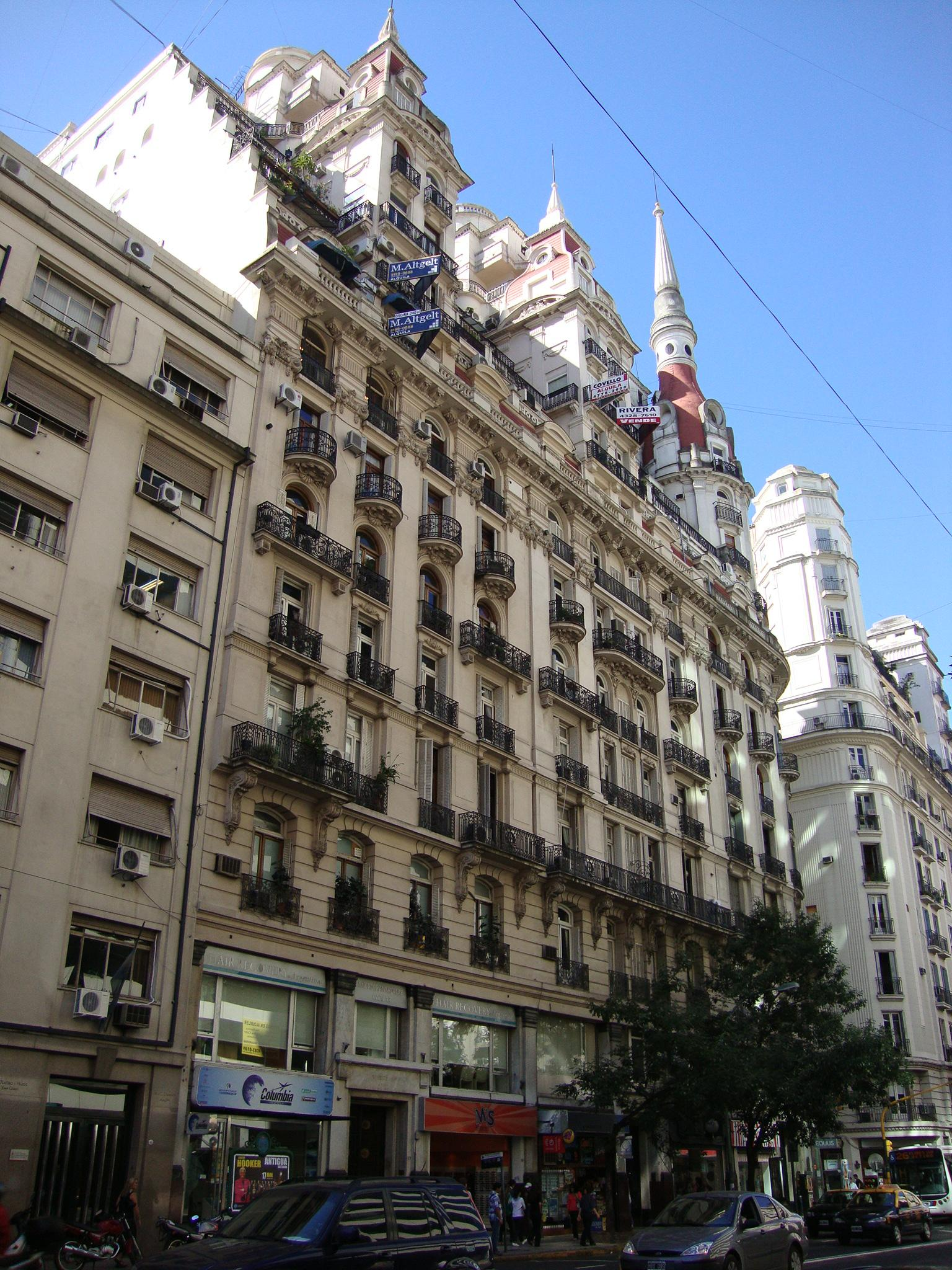
Bencich Building

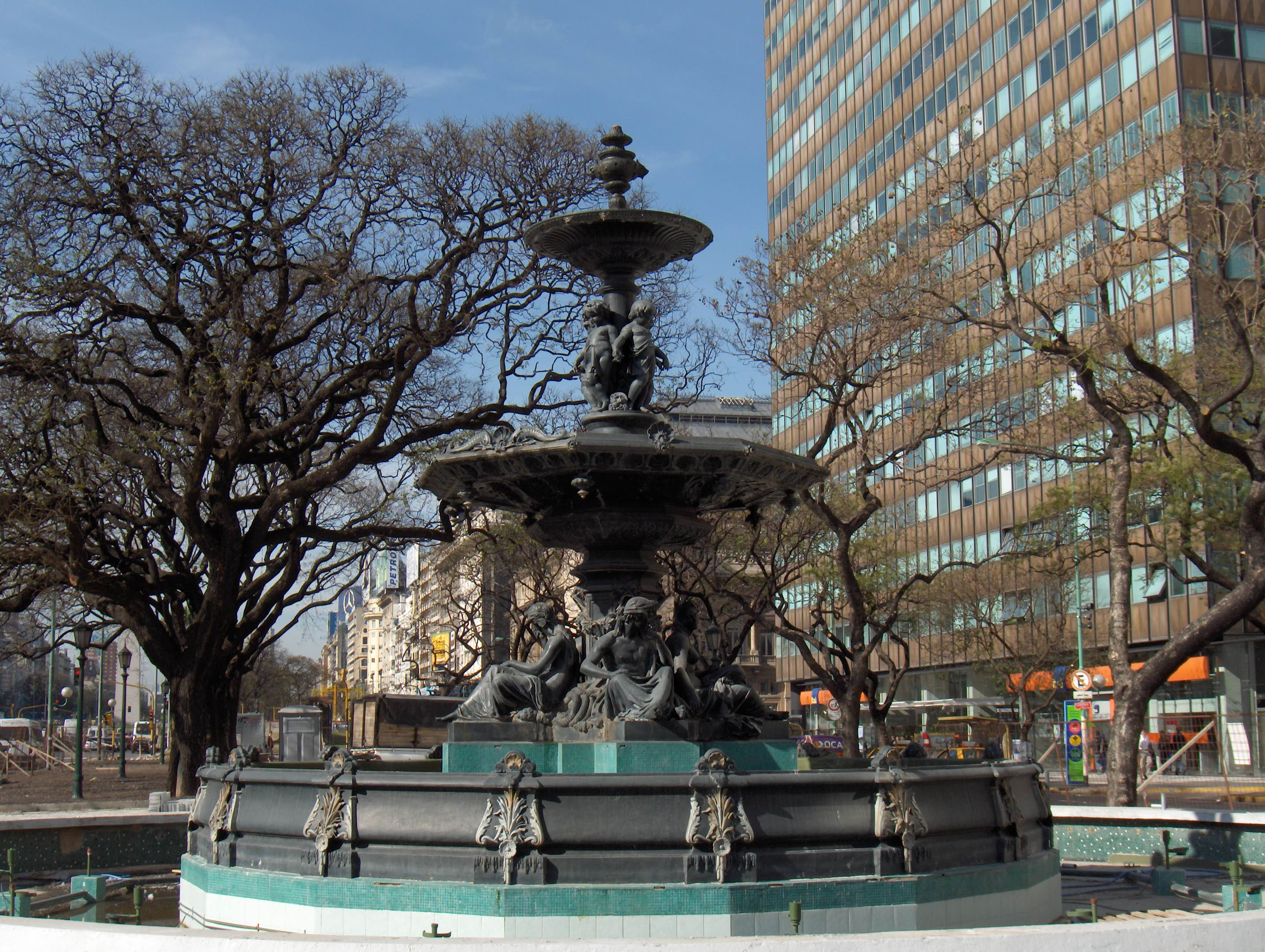
Fountain and the former FIAT building

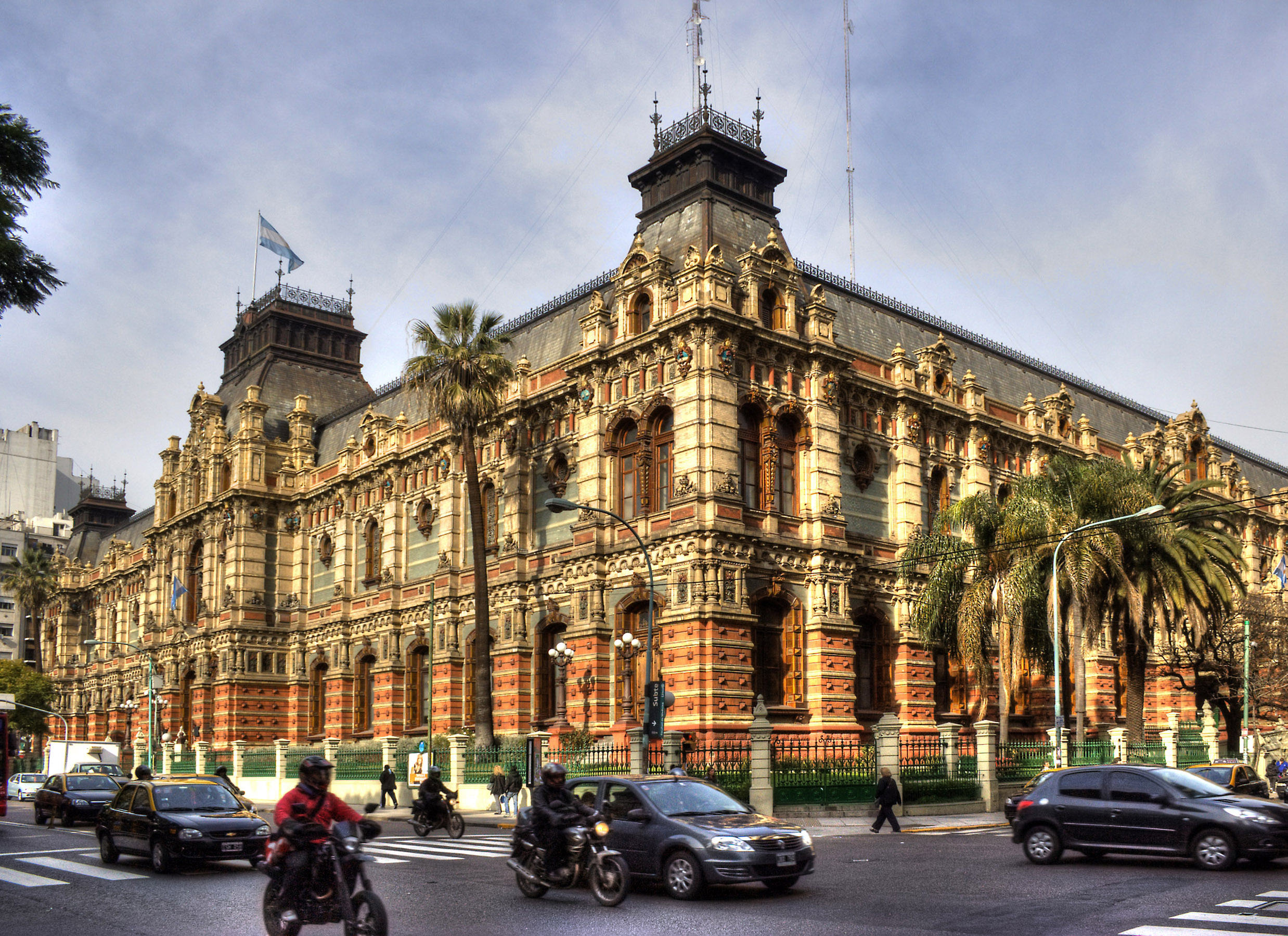
Palacio de Aguas Corrientes
