= 1938 =

1938 in various calendars
- Gregorian calendar: 1938; MCMXXXVIII
- Ab urbe condita: 2691
- Armenian calendar: 1387; ԹՎ ՌՅՁԷ
- Assyrian calendar: 6688
- Baháʼí calendar: 94–95
- Balinese saka calendar: 1859–1860
- Bengali calendar: 1344–1345
- Berber calendar: 2888
- British Regnal year: 2 Geo. 6 – 3 Geo. 6
- Buddhist calendar: 2482
- Burmese calendar: 1300
- Byzantine calendar: 7446–7447
- Chinese calendar: 丁丑年 (Fire Ox); 4635 or 4428 — to — 戊寅年 (Earth Tiger); 4636 or 4429
- Coptic calendar: 1654–1655
- Discordian calendar: 3104
- Ethiopian calendar: 1930–1931
- Hebrew calendar: 5698–5699
- Hindu calendars
- Vikram Samvat: 1994–1995
- Shaka Samvat: 1859–1860
- Kali Yuga: 5038–5039
- Holocene calendar: 11938
- Igbo calendar: 938–939
- Iranian calendar: 1316–1317
- Islamic calendar: 1356–1357
- Japanese calendar: Shōwa 13 (昭和１３年)
- Javanese calendar: 1868–1869
- Juche calendar: 27
- Julian calendar: Gregorian minus 13 days
- Korean calendar: 4271
- Minguo calendar: ROC 27 民國27年
- Nanakshahi calendar: 470
- Thai solar calendar: 2480–2481
- Tibetan calendar: མེ་མོ་གླང་ལོ་ (female Fire-Ox); 2064 or 1683 or 911 — to — ས་ཕོ་སྟག་ལོ་ (male Earth-Tiger); 2065 or 1684 or 912

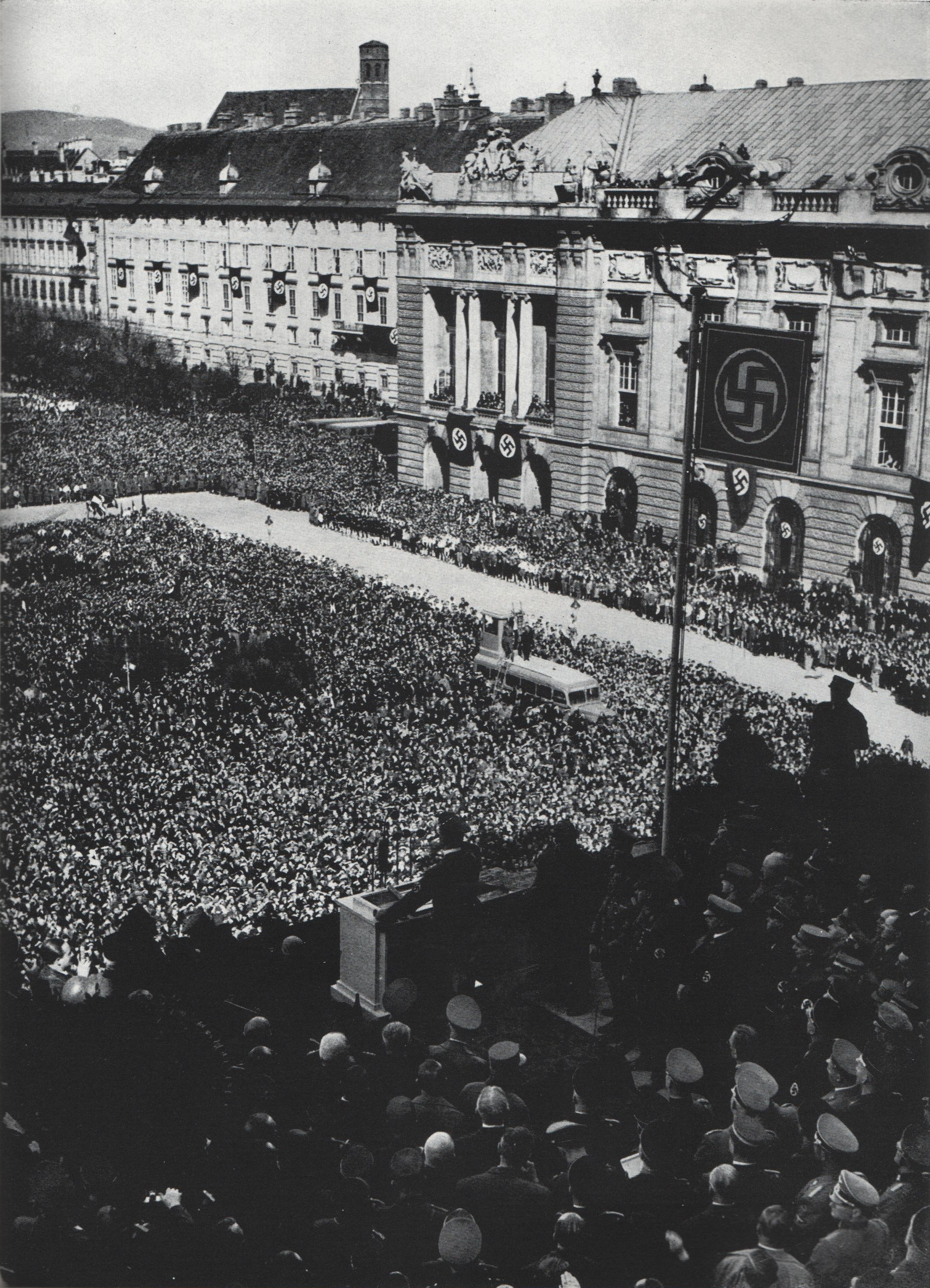
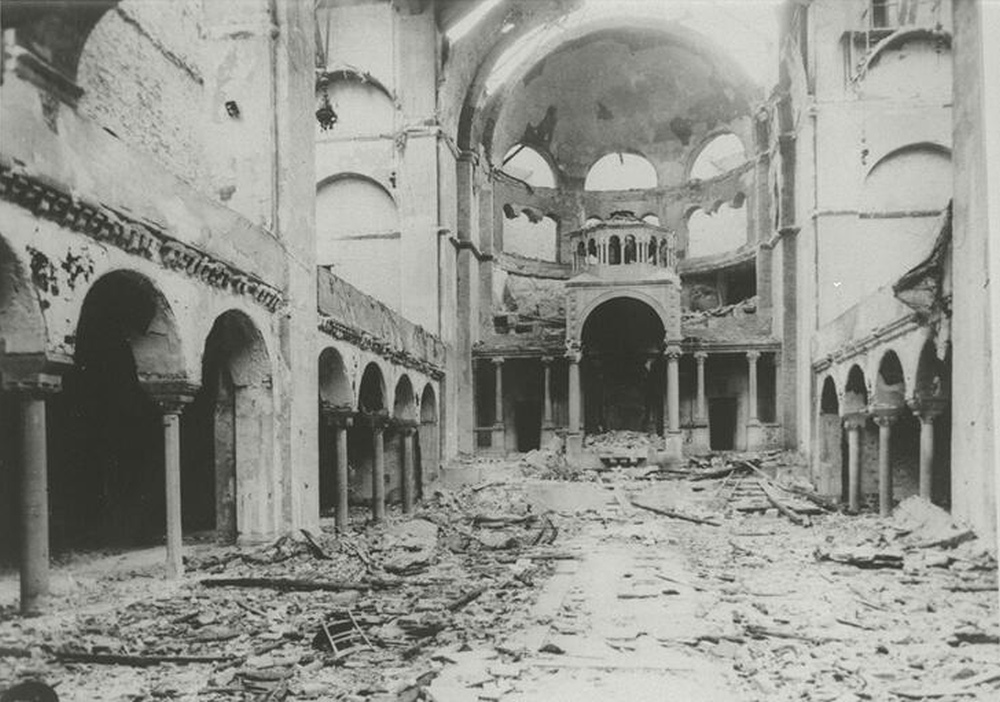
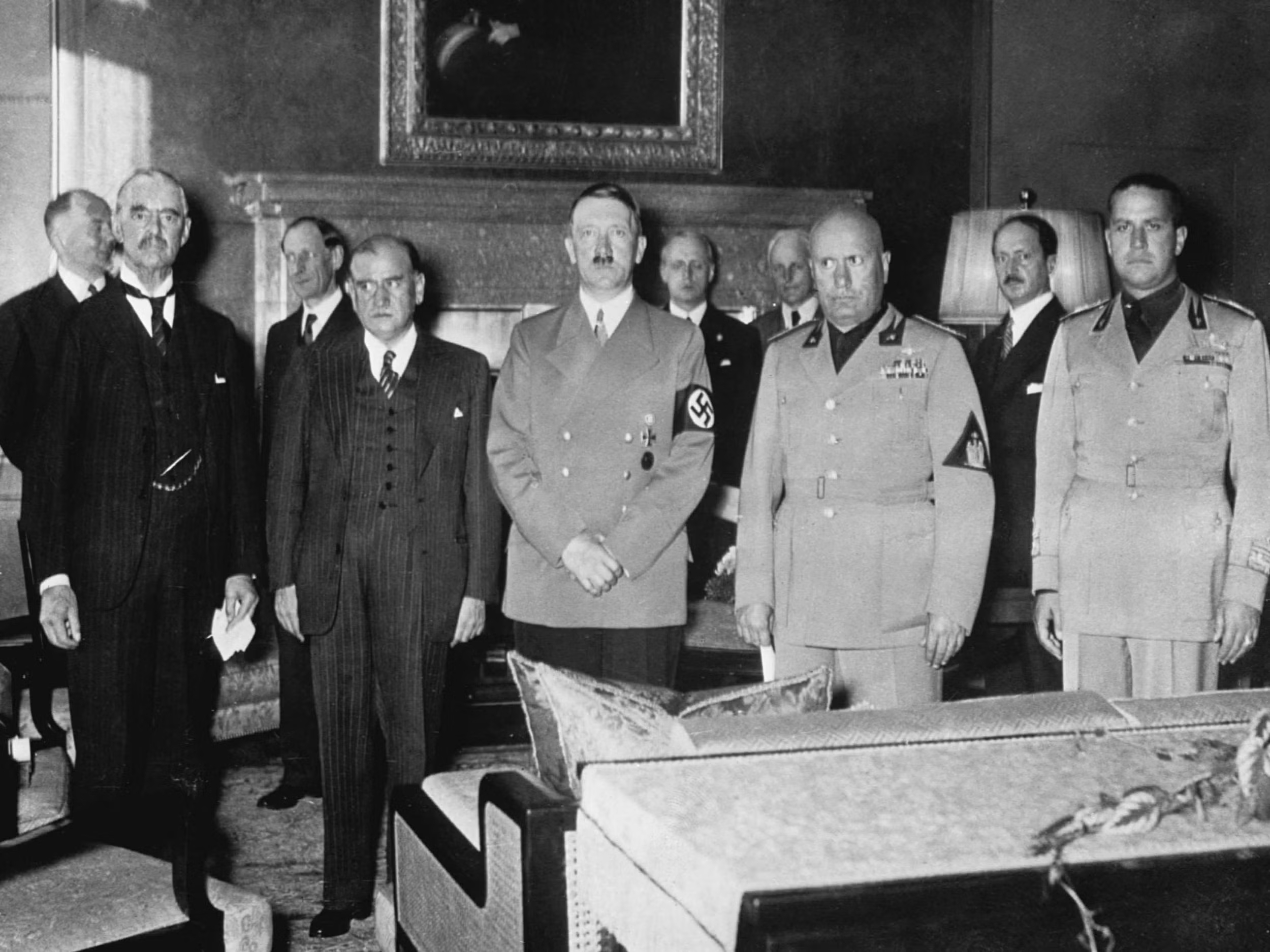
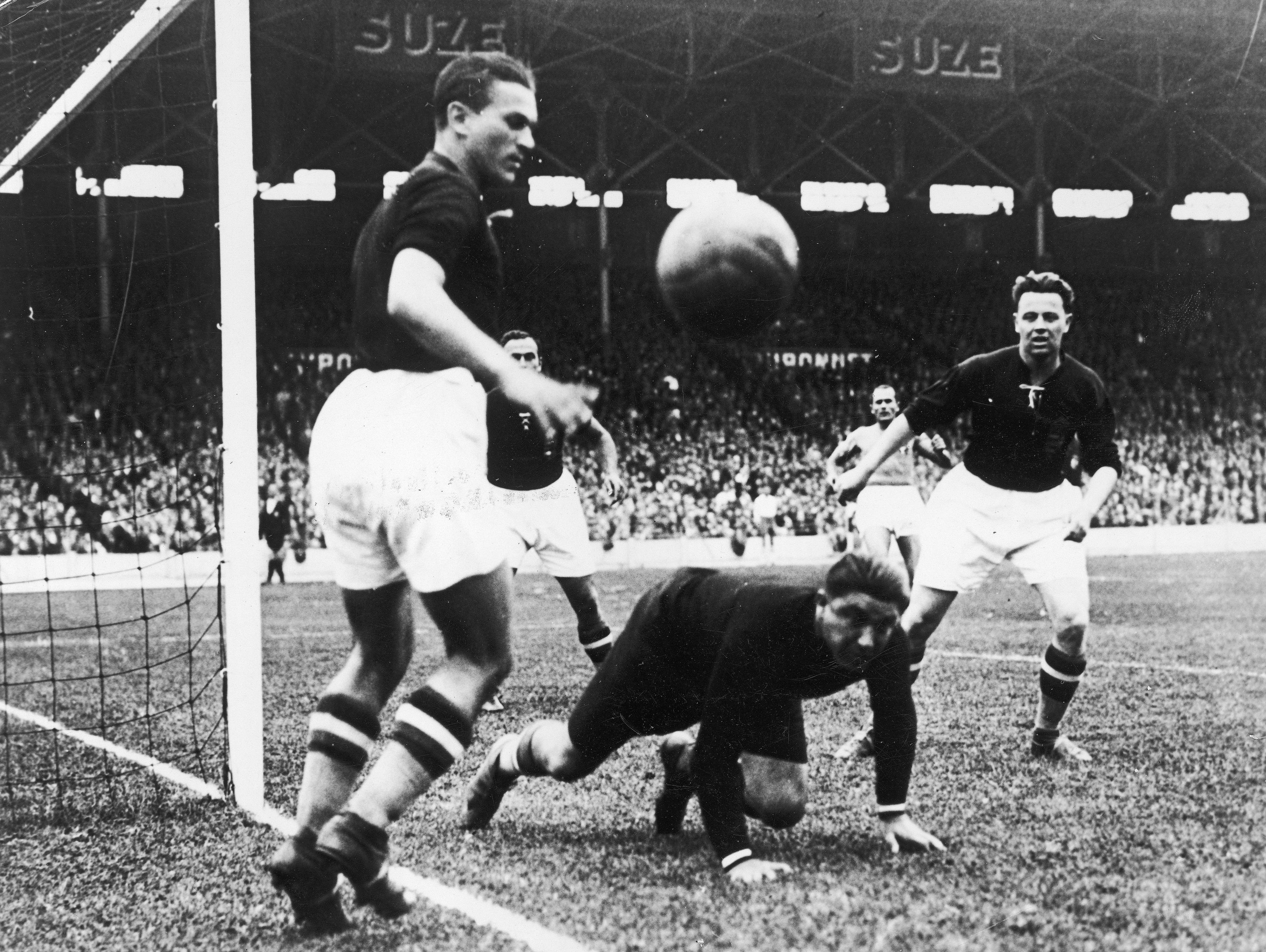
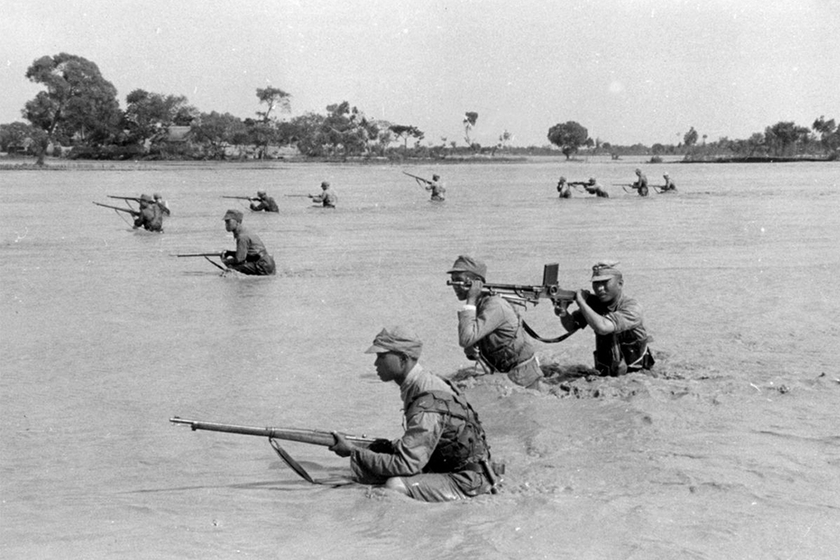
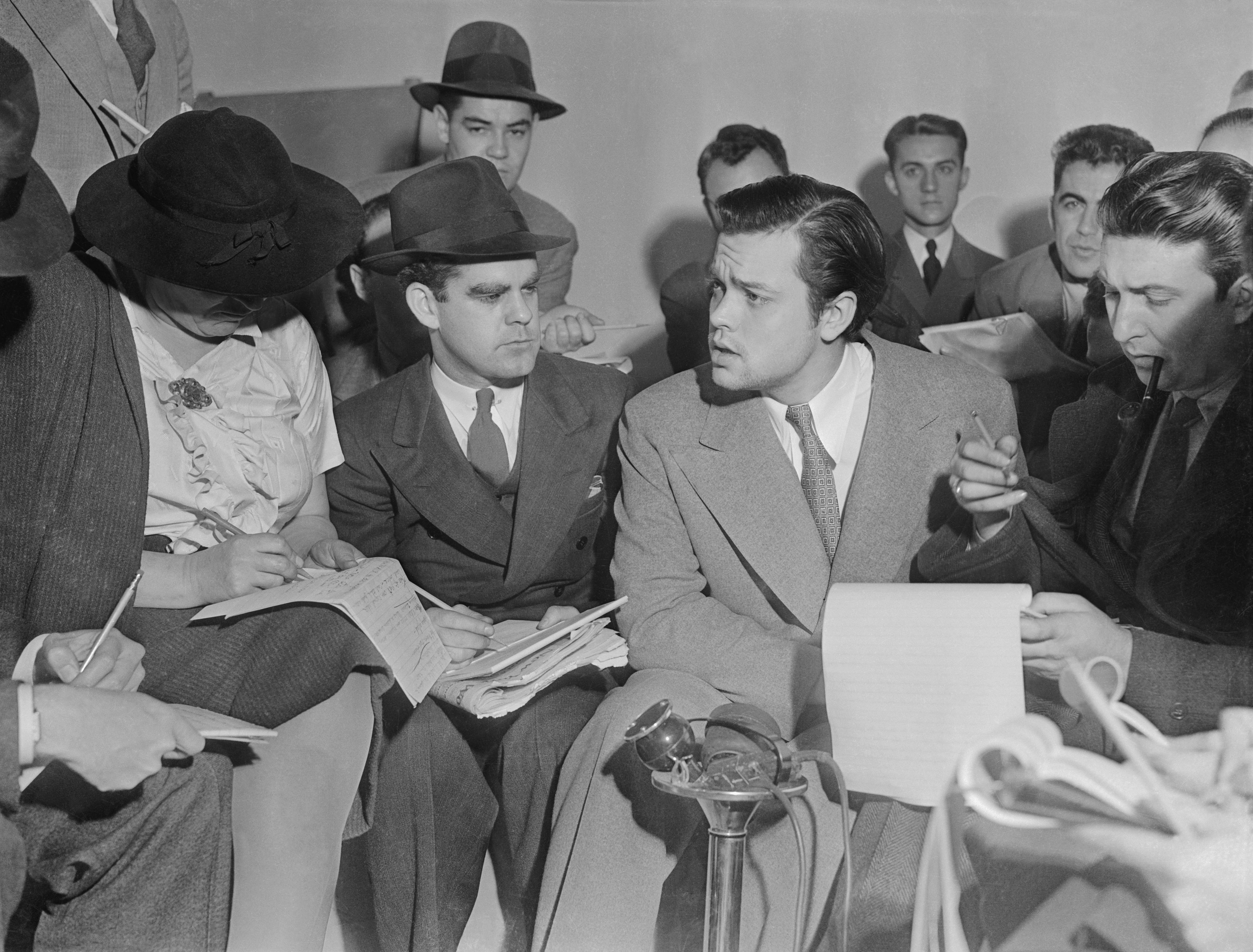
From top to bottom, left to right:
- The Anschluss sees Nazi Germany annex Austria, escalating Hitler's expansionist agenda;
- Kristallnacht erupts across Germany and Austria, with Jewish homes, businesses, and synagogues destroyed, thousands of Jewish people killed or arrested;
- The Munich Agreement is signed as Britain and France appease Hitler by allowing the annexation of the Sudetenland in Czechoslovakia;
- The 1938 FIFA World Cup is held in France, with Italy winning their second consecutive title;
- The 1938 Yellow River flood in China, caused by intentional dike breaches during the Second Sino-Japanese War, displaces millions;
- Orson Welles broadcasts "The War of the Worlds", causing panic among listeners.

1938 (MCMXXXVIII) was a common year starting on Saturday of the Gregorian calendar, the 1938th year of the Common Era (CE) and Anno Domini (AD) designations, the 938th year of the 2nd millennium, the 38th year of the 20th century, and the 9th year of the 1930s decade.

== Events ==
=== January ===
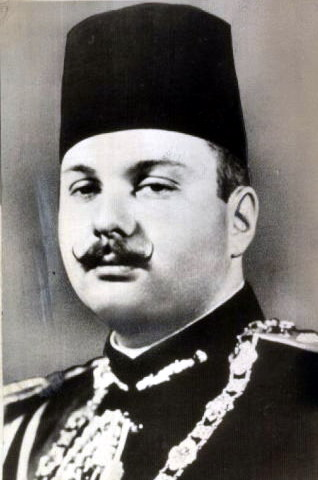
January 20: King Farouk

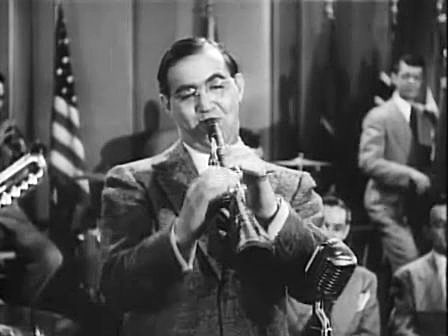
January 16: Benny Goodman in New York City

- January 1 – State-owned railway networks are created by merger, in France (SNCF) and the Netherlands (Nederlandse Spoorwegen – NS).
- January 20 – King Farouk of Egypt marries Safinaz Zulficar, who becomes Queen Farida, in Cairo.
- January 27 – The Honeymoon Bridge at Niagara Falls, New York, collapses as a result of an ice jam.

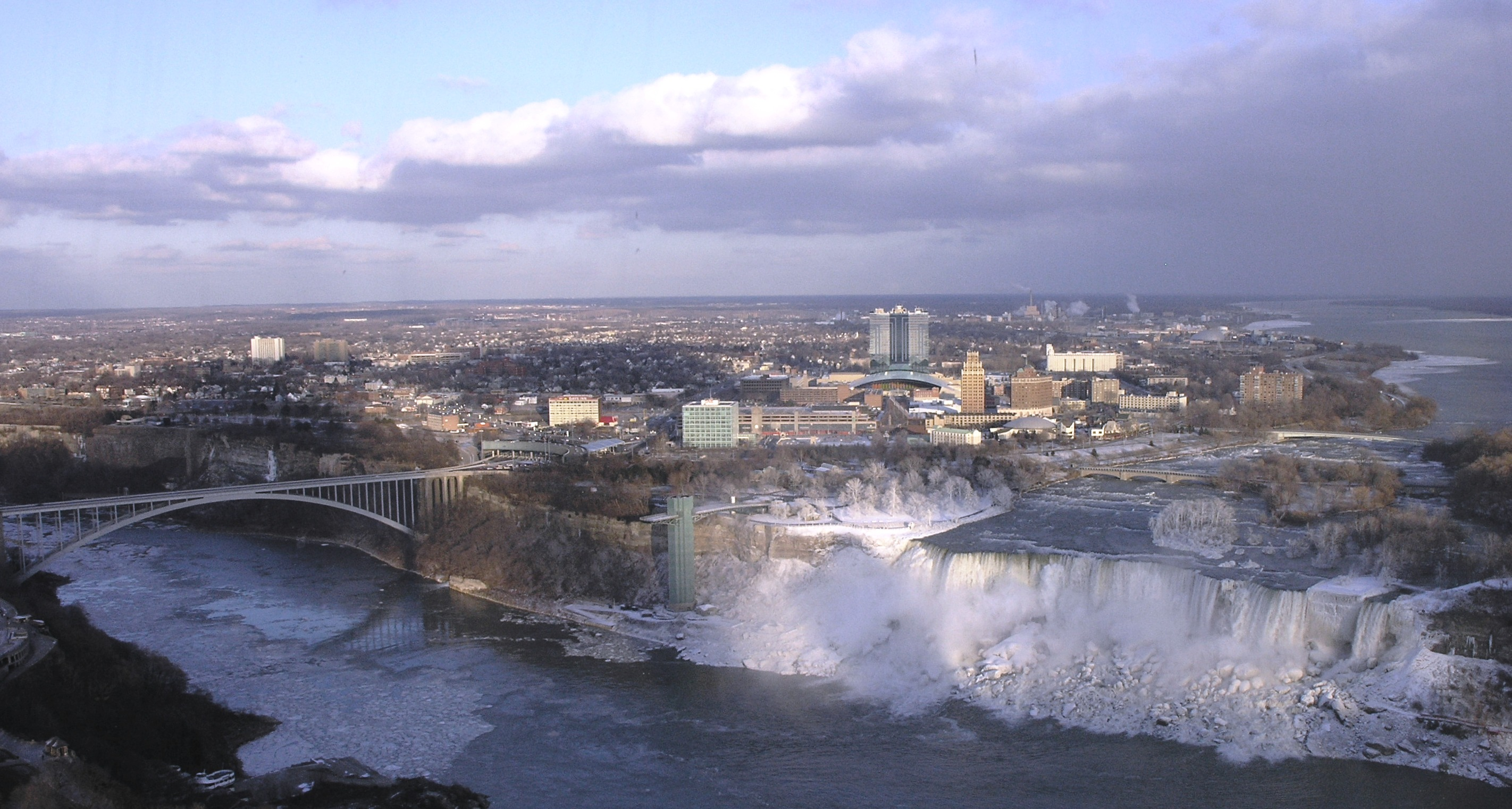
January 27: The Honeymoon Bridge, Niagara, collapses under ice.

=== February ===
- February 4
  - Adolf Hitler abolishes the War Ministry and creates the Oberkommando der Wehrmacht (High Command of the Armed Forces), giving him direct control of the German military. In addition, he dismisses political and military leaders considered unsympathetic to his philosophy or policies. General Werner von Fritsch is forced to resign as Commander of Chief of the German Army following accusations of homosexuality, and replaced by General Walther von Brauchitsch. Foreign Minister Baron Konstantin von Neurath is dismissed, and replaced by Joachim von Ribbentrop.
  - Walt Disney's Snow White and the Seven Dwarfs, the first cel-animated feature in motion picture history, is released in the United States, following a premiere on December 21 of the previous year.
- February 6 – Black Sunday at Bondi Beach, Sydney, Australia: 300 swimmers are dragged out to sea in 3 freak waves; 80 lifesavers save all but 5.
- February 10
  - Carol II of Romania takes dictatorial powers.
  - Second Sino-Japanese War: Bombing of Chongqing begins.
- February 12 – Chancellor Kurt von Schuschnigg of Austria meets Adolf Hitler at Berchtesgaden and, under threat of invasion, is forced to yield to German demands for greater Nazi participation in the Austrian government.
- February 22 – The Battle of Teruel ends in a Nationalist victory with recapture of the city, a turning point in the Spanish Civil War.
- February 24 – A nylon bristle toothbrush becomes the first commercial product to be made with nylon yarn.

=== March ===
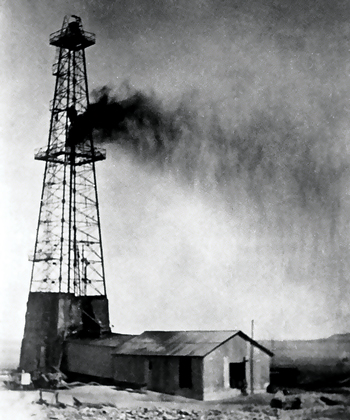
March 4: First commercial oil discovery in Saudi Arabia at Dammam No. 7

- March 1 – Lee Byung-chul establishes a trucking business in Daegu, South Korea, which he names Samsung Trading Co, the forerunner to Samsung.
- March 3
  - The Santa Ana River in California, United States, spills over its banks during a rainy winter, killing 58 people in Orange County, and causing trouble as far inland as Palm Springs.
  - Sir Nevile Henderson, British Ambassador to Germany, presents a proposal to Hitler for an international consortium to rule much of Africa (in which Germany would be assigned a leading role), in exchange for a German promise never to resort to war to change her frontiers; Hitler rejects the British offer.
- March 12 – Anschluss: German troops occupy Austria; annexation is declared the following day.
- March 14 – French Premier Léon Blum reassures the Czechoslovak government that France will honor its treaty obligations to aid Czechoslovakia, in the event of a German invasion.
- March 17 – Poland presents an ultimatum to Lithuania, to establish normal diplomatic relations that were severed over the Vilnius Region.
- March 27 – Italian mathematician Ettore Majorana disappears suddenly under mysterious circumstances, while travelling by ship from Palermo to Naples.
- March 28 – At a meeting with Hitler in Berlin, Konrad Henlein is instructed to make increasing demands concerning the status of the Sudetenland, but to avoid reaching an agreement with Czechoslovak authorities.
- March 30 – Italy's Duce Benito Mussolini is granted equal power over the Italian military to that of King Victor Emmanuel III, as First Marshal of the Empire.

=== April ===
- April 10
  - Édouard Daladier becomes prime minister of France. He appoints as Foreign Minister a leading advocate of the policy of appeasement, Georges Bonnet, effectively negating Blum's reassurances of March 14.
  - A referendum on the Anschluss is held in the former territories of Austria. The official results show 99.73% support.
- April 16 – The UK and Italy sign an agreement that sees Britain recognise Italian control of Ethiopia (formally on November 16), in return for an Italian pledge to withdraw all its 10,000 troops from Spain, at the conclusion of the civil war there.
- April 18 – Superman first appears in Action Comics #1 (cover date June). The date is established in court documents released during the legal battle over the rights to Superman (on April 18, 2018, DC Comics released Action Comics #1000).
- April 24 – Konstantin Päts becomes the first President of Estonia.

=== May ===
- May 5
  - The Vatican recognizes Francisco Franco's government in Spain.
  - General Ludwig Beck, Chief of the German Army's General Staff, submits a memorandum to Hitler opposing Fall Grün (Case Green), the plan for a war with Czechoslovakia, under the grounds that Germany is ill-prepared for the world war likely to result from such an attack.
- May 12 – U.S. Secretary of State Cordell Hull rejects the Soviet Union's offer of a joint defence pact, to counter the rise of Nazi Germany.
- May 14 – Chile withdraws from the League of Nations.
- May 19 – May Crisis 1938: Czechoslovak intelligence receives reports of menacing German military concentrations (it later appears the reports are false).
- May 20 – Czechoslovakia orders a partial mobilization of its armed forces along the German border.
- May 21 – Tsuyama massacre: Matsuo Toi kills 30 people in a village in Okayama, Japan, in the world's worst spree killing by an individual until 1957.
- May 23 – No evidence of German troop movements against Czechoslovakia is found, and the May Crisis subsides. Germany is, nevertheless, perceived to have backed down in the face of Czechoslovak mobilization and international diplomatic unity, but the issue of the future of the Sudetenland is far from resolved.
- May 25
  - Spanish Civil War: Alicante is bombed by fascist rebels, resulting in 313 deaths.
  - The Soviet ambassador to the United States, A. A. Troyanovsky, declares Moscow ready to defend Czechoslovakia.
- May 28 – In a conference at the Reich Chancellery, Hitler declares his decision to destroy Czechoslovakia by military force, and orders the immediate mobilization of 96 Wehrmacht divisions.
- May 30 – Hitler issues a revised directive for Fall Grün ("Case Green") – the invasion of Czechoslovakia – to be carried out by October 1, 1938.

=== June ===
- June 5 & 7 – The 1938 Yellow River flood is created by the Nationalist government in central China, breaching embankments during the early stage of the Second Sino-Japanese War, in an attempt to halt the rapid advance of Japanese forces. The flood kills at least 400,000, covers and destroys thousands of square kilometers of farmland, and shifts the mouth of the Yellow River hundreds of kilometers to the south.
- June 11 – Fire destroys 214 buildings in Ludza, Latvia.
- June 15 – László Bíró patents the ballpoint pen in Britain.
- June 19 – Italy beats Hungary 4–2, to win the 1938 FIFA World Cup.
- June 22 – Heavyweight boxing champion Joe Louis knocks out Max Schmeling in the first round of their rematch, at Yankee Stadium in New York City.
- June 25 – Dr. Douglas Hyde takes office as the first President of Ireland.
- June 27 – Kathryn Beaumont, British actress

=== July ===
- July – The Mauthausen concentration camp is built in Austria.
- July 1 – The South African Press Association is established, with offices in Cape Town, Johannesburg, Durban, Bloemfontein and Pretoria.
- July 3
  - The steam locomotive Mallard sets the world speed record for steam, by reaching 125.88 mph on the London and North Eastern Railway.
  - The last reunion of the Blue and Gray commemorates the 75th anniversary of the Battle of Gettysburg, in Gettysburg, Pennsylvania.
- July 5 – The Non-Intervention Committee reaches an agreement to withdraw all foreign volunteers from the Spanish Civil War. The agreement is respected by most Republican International Brigades, notably those from England and the United States, but is ignored by the governments of Germany and Italy.
- July 6 – The Evian Conference on Refugees is convened in France. No country in Europe is prepared to accept Jews fleeing persecution, and the United States will take only 27,370.
- July 14 – Howard Hughes sets a new record, by completing a 91-hour airplane flight around the world.
- July 18 – Wrong Way Corrigan takes off from New York, ostensibly heading for California. He lands in Ireland instead.
- July 22 – Britain rejects a proposal from its ambassador in Berlin, Nevile Henderson, for a four-power summit on Czechoslovakia consisting of Britain, France, Germany and the U.S.S.R., as London will under no circumstances accept the U.S.S.R. as a diplomatic partner.
- July 24 – The north face of the Eiger in the Alps is first ascended.
- July 28
  - 1938 Greek coup d'état attempt: A revolt against the Ioannis Metaxas dictatorship in Greece is put down in Chania.
  - Pan Am flying boat Hawaii Clipper disappears with 6 passengers and 9 crew members, en route from Guam to Manila.

=== August ===
- August – In the face of overwhelming Japanese military pressure, Chiang Kai-shek withdraws his government to Chungking.
- August 18 – Colonel General Ludwig Beck, convinced that Hitler's decision to attack Czechoslovakia will lead to a general European war, resigns his position as Chief of the Army General Staff in protest.
- August 23 – Hitler, hosting a dinner on board the ocean liner Patria in Kiel Bay, tells the Regent of Hungary, Admiral Horthy, that action against Czechoslovakia is imminent and that "he who wants to sit at the table must at least help in the kitchen", a reference to Horthy's designs on Carpathian Ruthenia.

=== September ===
- September – The European crisis over German demands for annexation of the Sudeten borderland of Czechoslovakia becomes increasingly severe.
- September 5 – Czechoslovak President Edvard Beneš invites mid-level representatives of the Sudeten Germans Hradčany Palace, to tell them he will accept whatever demands they care to make, provided the Sudetenland remains part of the Republic of Czechoslovakia.
- September 6 – What eventually proves to be the last of the "Nuremberg Rallies" begins. It draws worldwide attention because it is widely assumed that Hitler, in his closing remarks, will signal whether there will be peace with or war over Czechoslovakia.
- September 10 – Hermann Göring, in a speech at Nuremberg, calls the Czechs a "miserable pygmy race" who are "harassing the human race". That same evening, Edvard Beneš, President of Czechoslovakia, makes a broadcast in which he appeals for calm.
- September 12 – Hitler makes his much-anticipated closing address at Nuremberg, in which he vehemently attacks the Czech people and President Beneš. American news commentator H. V. Kaltenborn begins his famous marathon of broadcast bulletins over the CBS Radio Network, with a summation of Hitler's address.
- September 13 – The followers of Konrad Henlein begin an armed revolt against the Czechoslovak government in Sudetenland. Martial law is declared and after much bloodshed on both sides order is temporarily restored. Neville Chamberlain personally sends a telegram to Hitler, urgently requesting that they both meet.
- September 15 – Neville Chamberlain arrives in Berchtesgaden, to begin negotiations with Hitler over the Sudetenland.
- September 16 – Lord Runciman is recalled to London from Prague, in order to brief the British government on the situation in the Sudetenland.
- September 17 – Neville Chamberlain returns temporarily to London, to confer with his cabinet. The U.S.S.R. Red Army masses along the Ukrainian frontier. Romania agrees to allow Soviet soldiers free passage across her territory to defend Czechoslovakia.
- September 18
  - During a meeting between Neville Chamberlain, the recently elected Premier of France, Édouard Daladier, and Daladier's Foreign Minister, Georges Bonnet, it becomes apparent that neither the British nor the French governments are prepared to go to war over the Sudetenland. The Soviet Union declares it will come to the defence of Czechoslovakia only if France honours her commitment to defend Czechoslovak independence.
  - Mussolini makes a speech in Trieste, Italy, where he indicates that Italy is supporting Germany in the Sudeten crisis.
- September 21
  - In the early hours of the day, representatives of the French and British governments call on Czechoslovak President Edvard Beneš, to tell him France and Britain will not fight Hitler if he decides to annex the Sudetenland by force. Late in the afternoon, the Czechoslovak government capitulates to the French and British demands.
  - Winston Churchill warns of grave consequences to European security, if Czechoslovakia is partitioned. The same day, Soviet Foreign Commissar Maxim Litvinov makes a similar statement in the League of Nations.
  - Following the capitulation of the Czech government to Germany's demands, both Poland and Hungary demand slices of Czech territory where their nationals reside.
  - The 1938 New England hurricane in the United States strikes Long Island and southern New England, killing over 300 along the Rhode Island shoreline and 600 altogether.
- September 22
  - Unable to survive the previous day's capitulation to the demands of the British and French governments, Czechoslovak premier Milan Hodža resigns. General Jan Syrový takes his place.
  - Neville Chamberlain arrives in the city of Bad Godesberg, for another round of talks with Hitler over the Sudetenland crisis. Hitler raises his demands to include occupation of all German Sudeten territories by October 1. That night after a telephone conference, Chamberlain reverses himself and advises the Czechoslovaks to mobilize.
- September 23
  - The Czechoslovak army mobilizes.
  - As the Polish army masses along the Czech border, the Soviet Union warns Poland that if it crosses the Czech frontier, Russia will regard the 1932 non-aggression pact between the two countries as void.
- September 24
  - Sir Eric Phipps, British Ambassador to France, reports to London, "all that is best in France is against war, almost at any price", being opposed only by a "small, but noisy and corrupt, war group". Phipps's report creates major doubts about the ability and willingness of France to go to war.
  - At 1:30 AM, Adolf Hitler and Neville Chamberlain conclude their talks on the Sudetenland. Chamberlain agrees to take Hitler's demands, codified in the Godesberg Memorandum, personally to the Czech Government. The Czech Government rejects the demands, as does Chamberlain's own cabinet. The French Government also initially rejects the terms and orders a partial mobilization of the French army.
- September 25 – British Royal Navy is ordered to sea.
- September 26 – In a vitriolic speech at Berlin's Sportpalast, Hitler defies the world and implies war with Czechoslovakia will begin at any time.
- September 28 – As his self-imposed October 1 deadline for occupation of the Sudetenland approaches, Adolf Hitler invites Italian Duce Benito Mussolini, French Premier Édouard Daladier, and British Prime Minister Neville Chamberlain to one last conference in Munich. The Czechs themselves are not invited.
- September 29
  - Colonel Graham Christie, former British military attaché in Berlin, is told by Carl Friedrich Goerdeler that the mobilization of the Royal Navy has badly damaged the popularity of the Nazi regime, as the German public realizes that Fall Grün is likely to cause a world war.
  - Munich Agreement: German, Italian, British and French leaders agree to German demands regarding annexation of the Sudetenland in Czechoslovakia. The Czechoslovak government is largely excluded from the negotiations, and is not a signatory to the agreement.
  - The Republic of Hatay is declared in Syria; it lasts for less than a year.
- September 30 – Neville Chamberlain returns to Britain from meeting with Adolf Hitler, and declares "Peace for our time".

=== October ===
- October – The Imperial Japanese Army largely overruns Canton.
- October 1 – German troops march into the Sudetenland. The Polish government gives the Czech government an ultimatum, stating that Trans-Olza region must be handed over within twenty-four hours. The Czechs have little choice but to comply; Polish forces occupy Trans-Olza.
- October 2
  - Tiberias massacre: Arab raiders murder 19 Jewish immigrants.
  - Disgusted with Neville Chamberlain's conduct at Munich, Duff Cooper resigns his post as First Lord of the Admiralty. With his resignation, formal debate begins in the Parliament of the United Kingdom on the Munich Agreement, but with Chamberlain at the peak of his popularity, there can be little doubt His Majesty's Government will receive a vote of confidence.
- October 4 – The Republican forces in the Spanish Civil War begin withdrawing their foreign volunteers from combat, as agreed on July 5.
- October 5
  - Edvard Beneš, president of Czechoslovakia, resigns.
  - Nuremberg Laws: In Nazi Germany, Jews' passports are invalidated, and those who need a passport for emigration purposes are given one marked with the letter J ("Jude" – "Jew").
- October 16 – Winston Churchill, in a broadcast address to the United States, condemns the Munich Agreement as a defeat, and calls upon America and western Europe to prepare for armed resistance against Hitler.
- October 18 – The German government expels 12,000 Polish Jews living in Germany; the Polish government accepts 4,000 and refuses admittance to the remaining 8,000, who are forced to live in the no-man's land on the German-Polish frontier.
- October 21 – In direct contravention of the recently signed Munich Agreement, Adolf Hitler circulates among his high command a secret memorandum stating that they should prepare for the "liquidation of the rest of Czechoslovakia" and the occupation of Memel.
- October 24
  - French Foreign Minister Georges Bonnet carries out a major purge of the Ministry of Foreign Affairs, dismissing or exiling a number of anti-appeasement officials such as Pierre Comert and René Massigli.
  - At a "friendly luncheon" in Berchtesgaden, German foreign minister Joachim von Ribbentrop tells Józef Lipski, the Polish ambassador to Germany, that the Free City of Danzig must return to Germany, that the Germans must be given extraterritorial rights in the Polish Corridor, and that Poland must sign the Anti-Comintern Pact.
- October 27 – DuPont announces a name for its new synthetic yarn: "nylon".

=== November ===
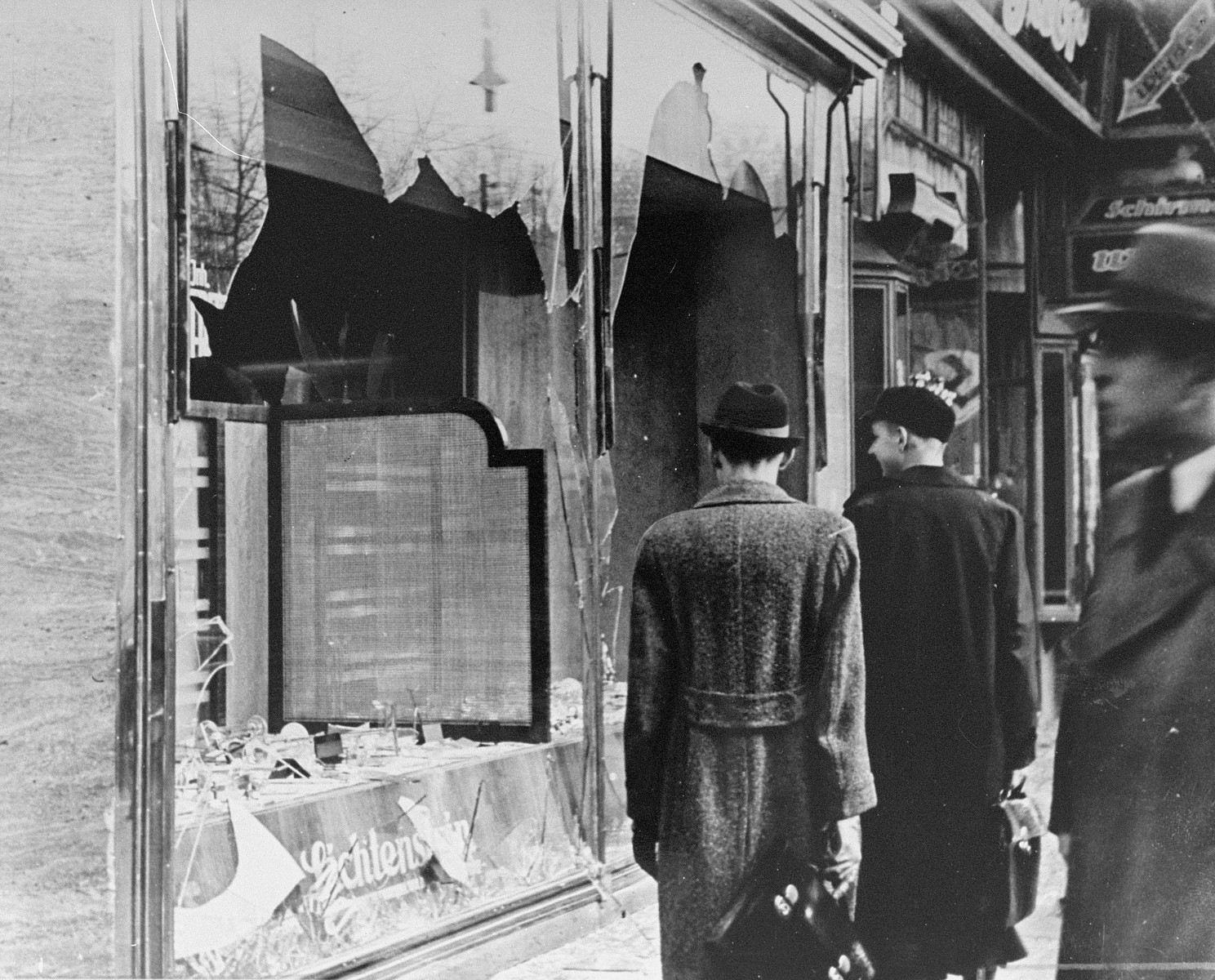
November 9–10: Night of Broken Glass

- November 2 – Arising from The Munich Agreement, Hungary is "awarded" the Felvidek region of South Slovakia and Ruthenia.
- November 7 – Ernst vom Rath, the Third Secretary at the German Embassy in Paris, is assassinated by Herschel Grynszpan.
- November 9 – Holocaust – Kristallnacht: In Germany, the "night of broken glass" begins as Nazi activists and sympathizers loot and burn Jewish businesses (the all night affair sees 7,500 Jewish businesses destroyed, 267 synagogues burned, 91 Jews killed and at least 25,000 Jewish men arrested). One of several significant events on 9 November in German history.
- November 11
  - İsmet İnönü becomes the second president of Turkey.
  - Celâl Bayar forms the new government of Turkey (10th government; Celal Bayar had served twice as a prime minister).
- November 12 – French Finance Minister Paul Reynaud brings into effect a series of laws aiming at improving French productivity (thus aiming to undo the economic weaknesses which led to Munich), and undoes most of the economic and social laws of the Popular Front.
- November 16 – LSD is first synthesized by Albert Hofmann from ergotamine, at the Sandoz Laboratories in Basel.
- November 25 – French Foreign Minister Georges Bonnet informs Léon Noël, the French Ambassador to Poland, that France should find an excuse for terminating the 1921 Franco-Polish alliance.
- November 30
  - The Czechoslovak parliament elects Emil Hácha as the new president of Czechoslovakia.
  - Benito Mussolini and his Foreign Minister, Count Galeazzo Ciano, order "spontaneous" demonstrations in the Italian Chamber of Deputies, demanding that France cede Tunisia, Nice, Corsica and French Somaliland to Italy. This begins an acute crisis in Franco-Italian relations, that lasts until March 1939.
  - Corneliu Zelea Codreanu, leader of the Romanian fascist Iron Guard, is murdered on the orders of King Carol II of Romania. Officially, Codreanu and the 13 other Iron Guard leaders are "shot while trying to escape".
  - A general strike is called in France by the French Communist Party, to protest the laws of November 12.

=== December ===
- December – Adolf Hitler is Time magazine's "Man of the Year", as the most influential person of the year.
- December 1 – Slovakia is granted the status of an autonomous state, under Catholic priest Fr. Joseph Tiso.
- December 6 – German Foreign Minister Joachim von Ribbentrop visits Paris, where he is allegedly informed by French Foreign Minister Georges Bonnet that France now recognizes all of Eastern Europe as being in Germany's exclusive sphere of influence. Bonnet's alleged statement (he subsequently always denies making the remark) to Ribbentrop is a major factor in German policy in 1939.
- December 11 – Kingdom of Yugoslavia parliamentary election: The opposition gains votes but not seats.
- December 13 – The Neuengamme concentration camp opens near Hamburg.
- December 15 – The Netherlands closes its border to refugees.
- December 17 – Otto Hahn discovers the nuclear fission of uranium, the scientific and technological basis of nuclear power, which marks the beginning of the Atomic Age.
- December 23 – A coelacanth, a fish thought to have been extinct, is caught off the coast of South Africa, near the Chalumna River.
- December 24 – Leading Korean dancer Choi Seung-hee arrives in Le Havre, France after her tour in the United States. This is to begin her European tour in France, Belgium, Switzerland, Italy, Germany, and the Netherlands. She is the first Korean Wave entertainer.
- December 27 – A massive avalanche of snow hits a construction worker dormitory site in Kurobe, Japan, killing 87 people.

=== Date unknown ===
- Majlis Khuddam-ul Ahmadiyya is established by Khalifat-ul Masih II, Mirza Basheer-ud-Din Mahmood Ahmad, the second Caliph of the Ahmadiyya Muslim Community.
- The last Schomburgk's deer in the wild is said to have been killed.
- Herbert E. Ives and G. R. Stilwell execute the Ives–Stilwell experiment, showing that ions radiate at frequencies affected by their motion.

== Births ==
=== January–February ===
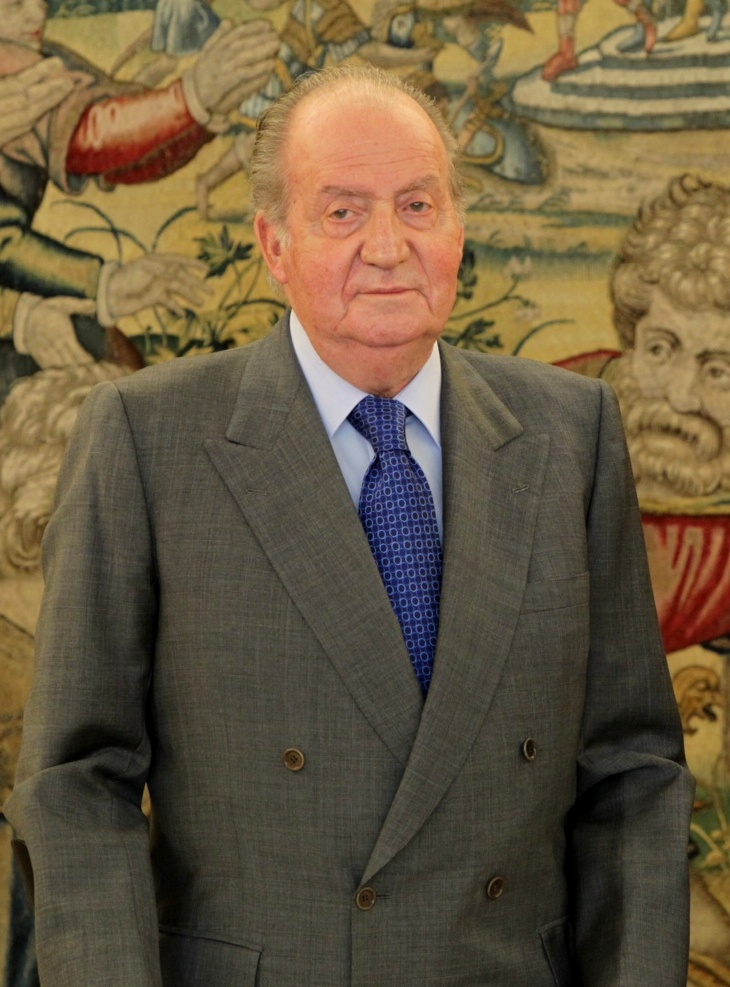
King Juan Carlos I of Spain

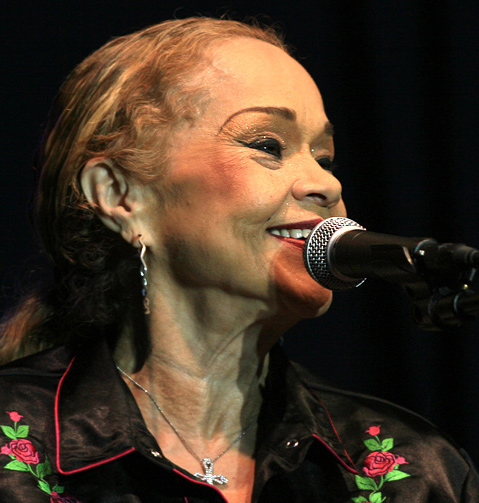
Etta James

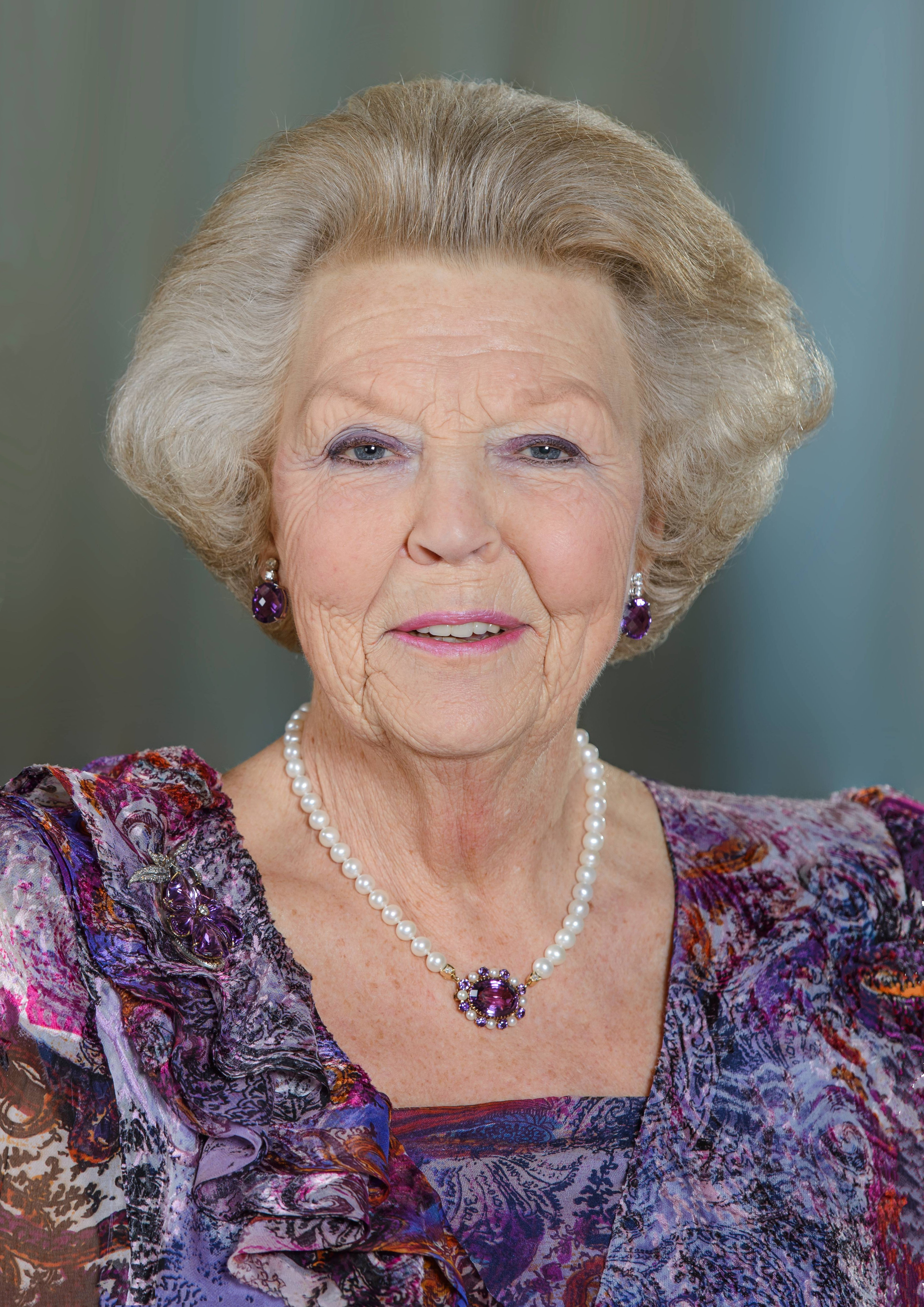
Queen Beatrix of the Netherlands

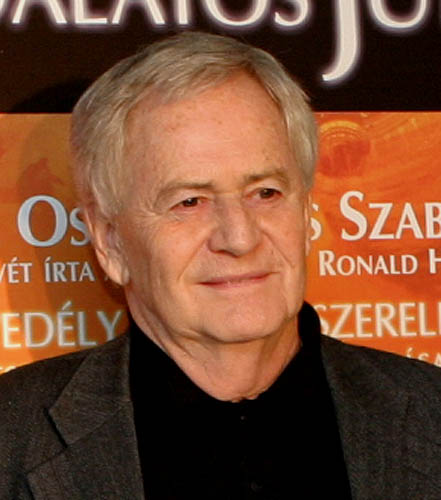
István Szabó

- January 2
  - Goh Kun, Korean politician, Mayor of Seoul and 31st Prime Minister of the Republic of Korea (South Korea)
  - Bohumil Němeček, Czech Olympic boxer (d. 2010)
- January 4 – Mohamed Rahmat ("Tok Mat"), Malaysian politician (d. 2010)
- January 5
  - King Juan Carlos I of Spain
  - Ngũgĩ wa Thiong'o, Kenyan writer (d. 2025)
- January 6 – Adriano Celentano, Italian singer-songwriter, musician, actor, and filmmaker
- January 7 – Roland Topor, French illustrator (d. 1997)
- January 10 – Donald Knuth, American mathematician and computer scientist
- January 13 – Shivkumar Sharma, Indian musician (d. 2022)
- January 14
  - Morihiro Hosokawa, Japanese politician, 50th Prime Minister of Japan
  - Jack Jones, American singer (d. 2024)
  - Allen Toussaint, American musician, composer (d. 2015)
- January 23 – Georg Baselitz, German painter, sculptor (d. 2026)
- January 24 – Don McGowan, Canadian television personality (d. 2023)
- January 25
  - Etta James, African-American singer (d. 2012)
  - Shotaro Ishinomori, Japanese manga artist (d. 1998)
  - Vladimir Vysotsky, Russian singer-songwriter, poet and actor (d. 1980)
  - Yolanda Ciani, Mexican actress (d. 2023)
- January 28 – Tomas Lindahl, Swedish biochemist, recipient of the Nobel Prize in Chemistry
- January 30 – Islam Karimov, President of Uzbekistan (d. 2016)
- January 31 – Queen Beatrix of the Netherlands
- February 1 – Sherman Hemsley, African-American comedian and actor (d. 2012)
- February 2 – Pilar Pellicer, Mexican actress (d. 2020)
- February 3 – Emile Griffith, American welterweight boxer (d. 2013)
- February 11 – Mohammed Gammoudi, Tunisian Olympic athlete
- February 18 – István Szabó, Hungarian film director
- February 21 – Anja Hatakka, Finnish actress and beauty pageant competitor (d. 2026)
- February 24
  - James Farentino, American actor (d. 2012)
  - Phil Knight, American sportswear entrepreneur
- February 25 – Herb Elliott, Australian runner
- February 27 – Pascale Petit, French actress

=== March–April ===
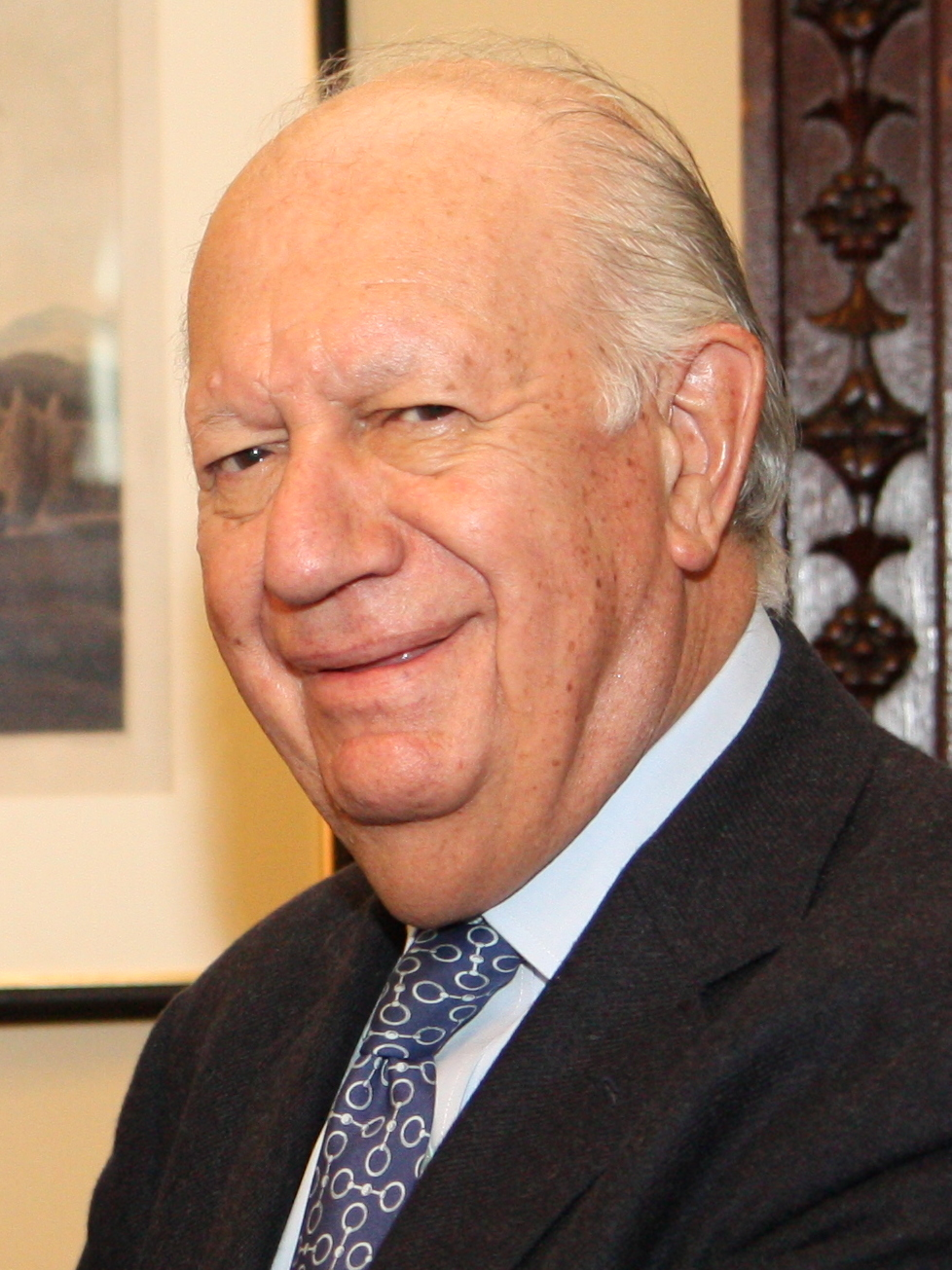
Ricardo Lagos Escobar

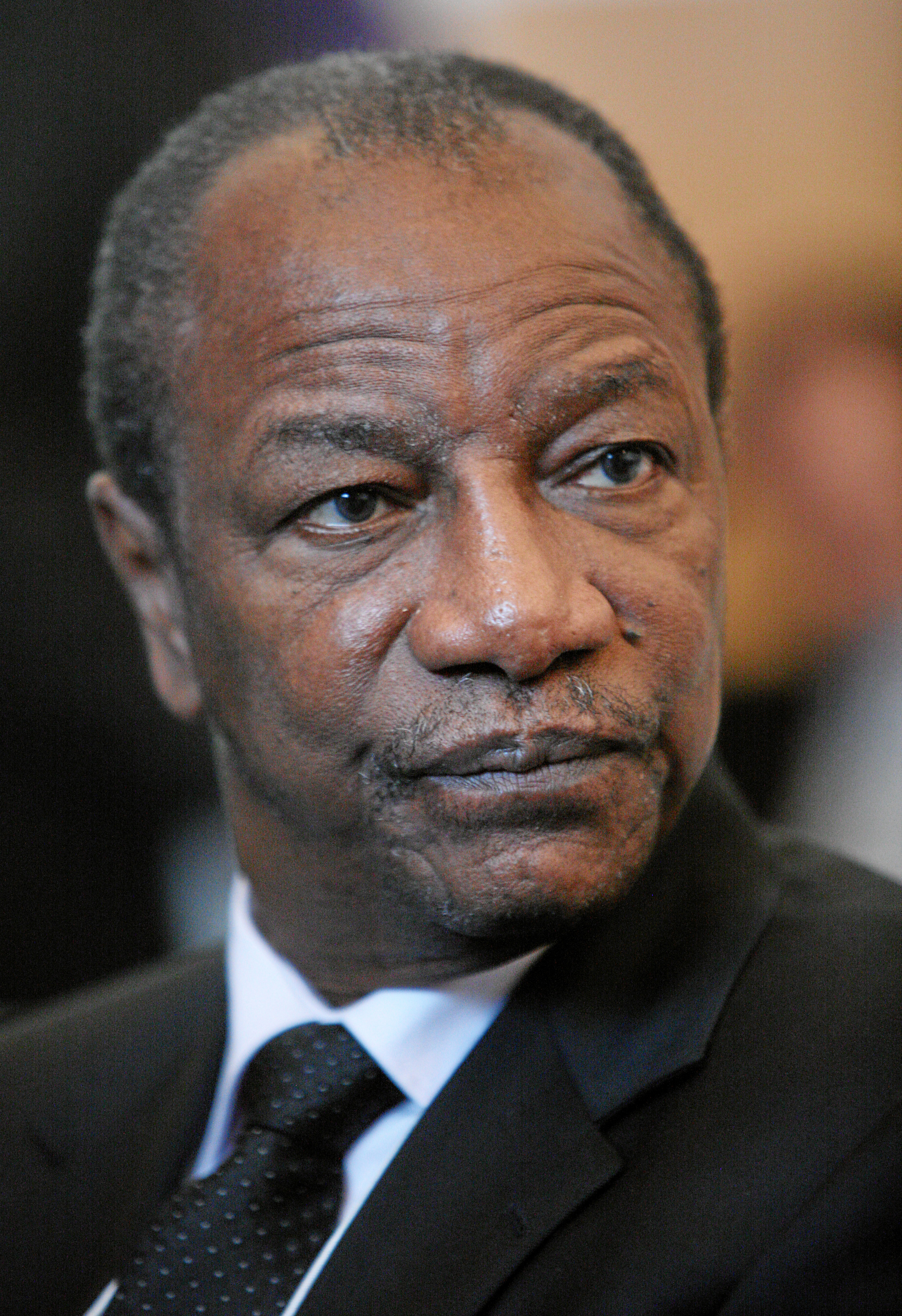
Alpha Condé

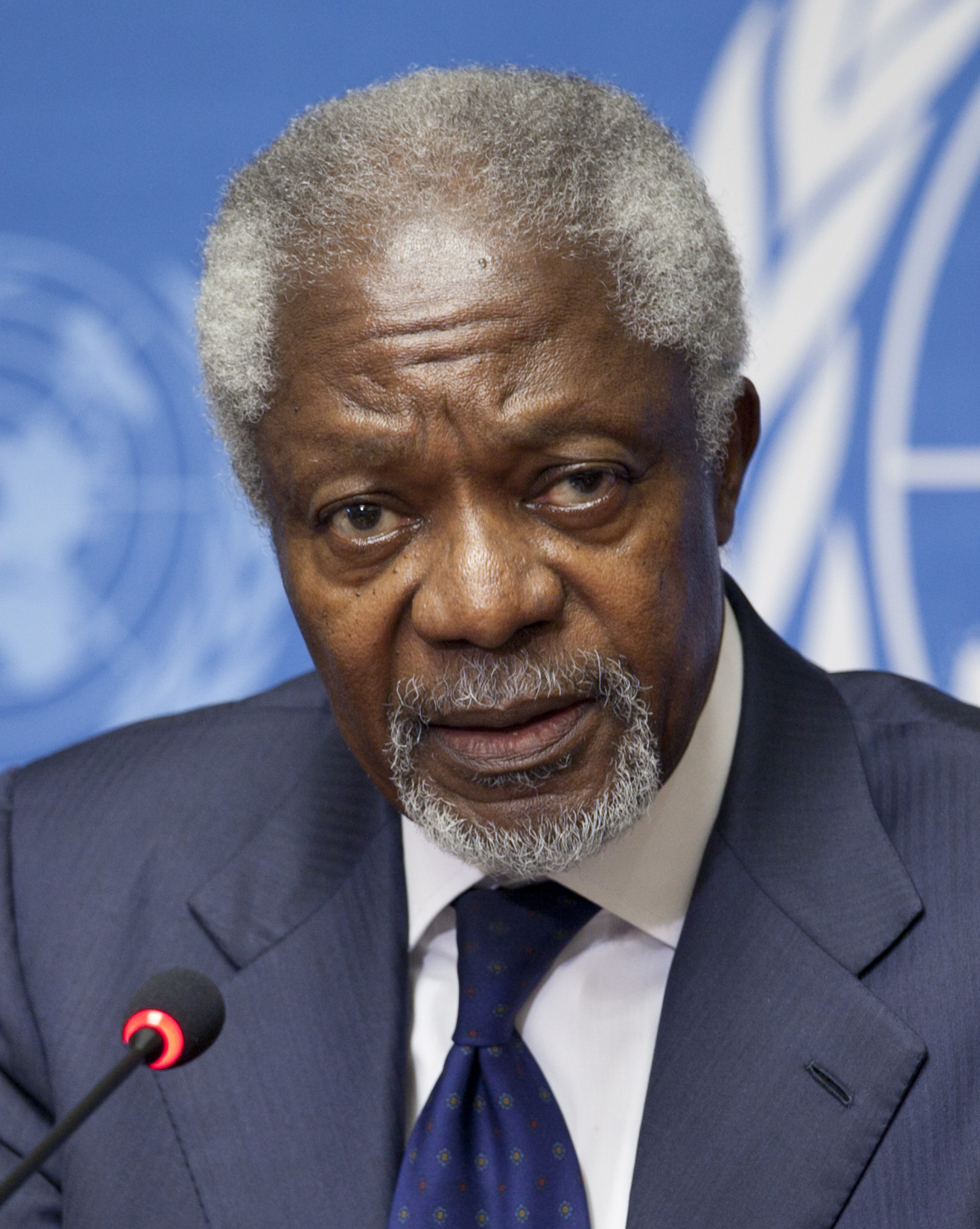
Kofi Annan

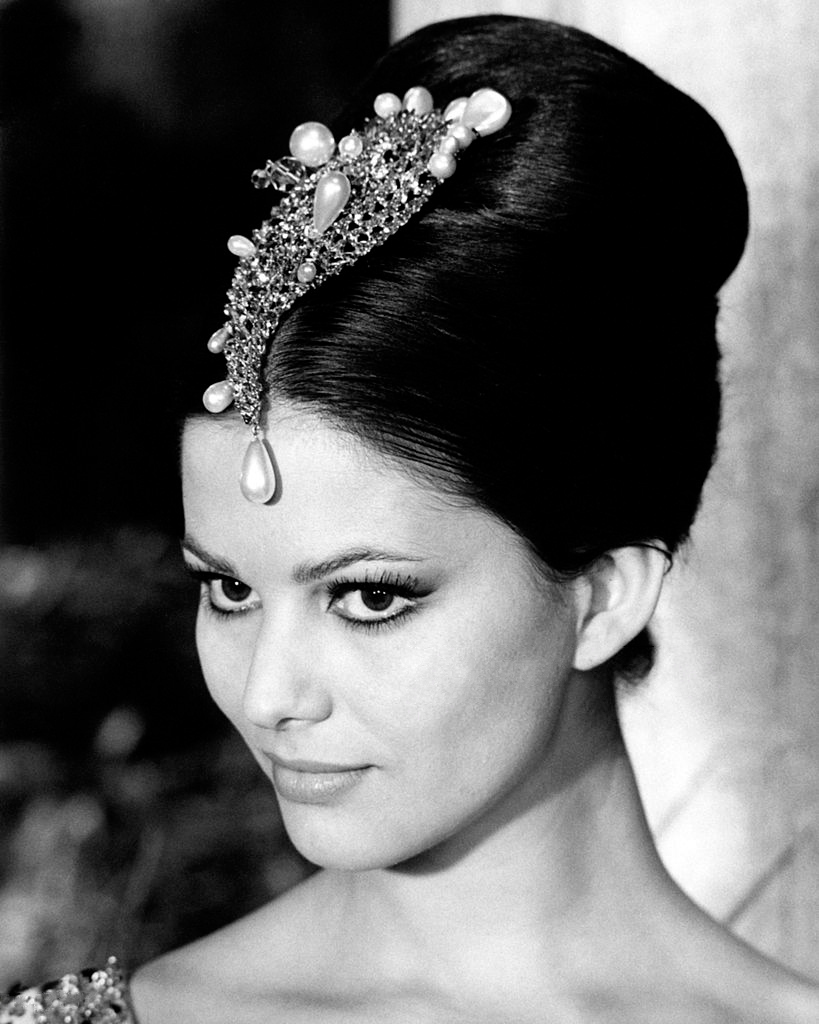
Claudia Cardinale

- March 1 – Tufuga Efi, Samoa political figure, 3rd Prime Minister of Samoa and O le Ao o le Malo of Samoa
- March 2 – Ricardo Lagos Escobar, President of Chile
- March 4
  - Alpha Condé, 4th President of Guinea
  - Paula Prentiss, American actress
- March 5 – Fred Williamson, American football player and actor
- March 7 – David Baltimore, American biologist, recipient of the Nobel Prize in Physiology or Medicine (d. 2025)
- March 14 – Árpád Orbán, Hungarian footballer (d. 2008)
- March 17
  - Rudolf Nureyev, Russian-born dancer, choreographer (d. 1993)
  - Keith O'Brien, Roman Catholic prelate, Archbishop of Edinburgh (d. 2018)
- March 18
  - Timo Mäkinen, Finnish racing driver (d. 2017)
  - Shashi Kapoor, Indian actor, director, and producer (d. 2017)
- March 21 – Luigi Tenco, Italian singer-songwriter (d. 1967)
- March 25 – Hoyt Axton, American country music singer, songwriter and actor (d. 1999)
- March 26 – Anthony James Leggett, American physicist, Nobel Prize laureate (d. 2026)
- March 30 – Klaus Schwab, German economist, founder of the World Economic Forum
- March 31 – Sheila Dikshit, Indian politician (d. 2019)
- April 7 – Freddie Hubbard, American jazz trumpeter (d. 2008)
- April 8 – Kofi Annan, Ghanaian Secretary-General of the United Nations, recipient of the Nobel Peace Prize (d. 2018)
- April 10 – Viktor Chernomyrdin, Russian politician (d. 2010)
- April 11 – Kurt Moll, German operatic bass (d. 2017)
- April 15 – Claudia Cardinale, Tunisian-born Italian actress (d. 2025)
- April 16 – Kasdi Merbah, Algerian politician, 4th Prime Minister of Algeria (d. 1993)
- April 20 – Betty Cuthbert, Australian track athlete (d. 2017)
- April 22 – Issey Miyake, Japanese fashion designer (d. 2022)
- April 26
  - Nino Benvenuti, Italian Olympic boxer (d. 2025)
  - Duane Eddy, American rock guitarist (d. 2024)
- April 28 – Madge Sinclair, Jamaican-American actress (d. 1995)
- April 29 – Bernard Madoff, American financial fraudster (d. 2021)
- April 30 – Larry Niven, American author

=== May–June ===
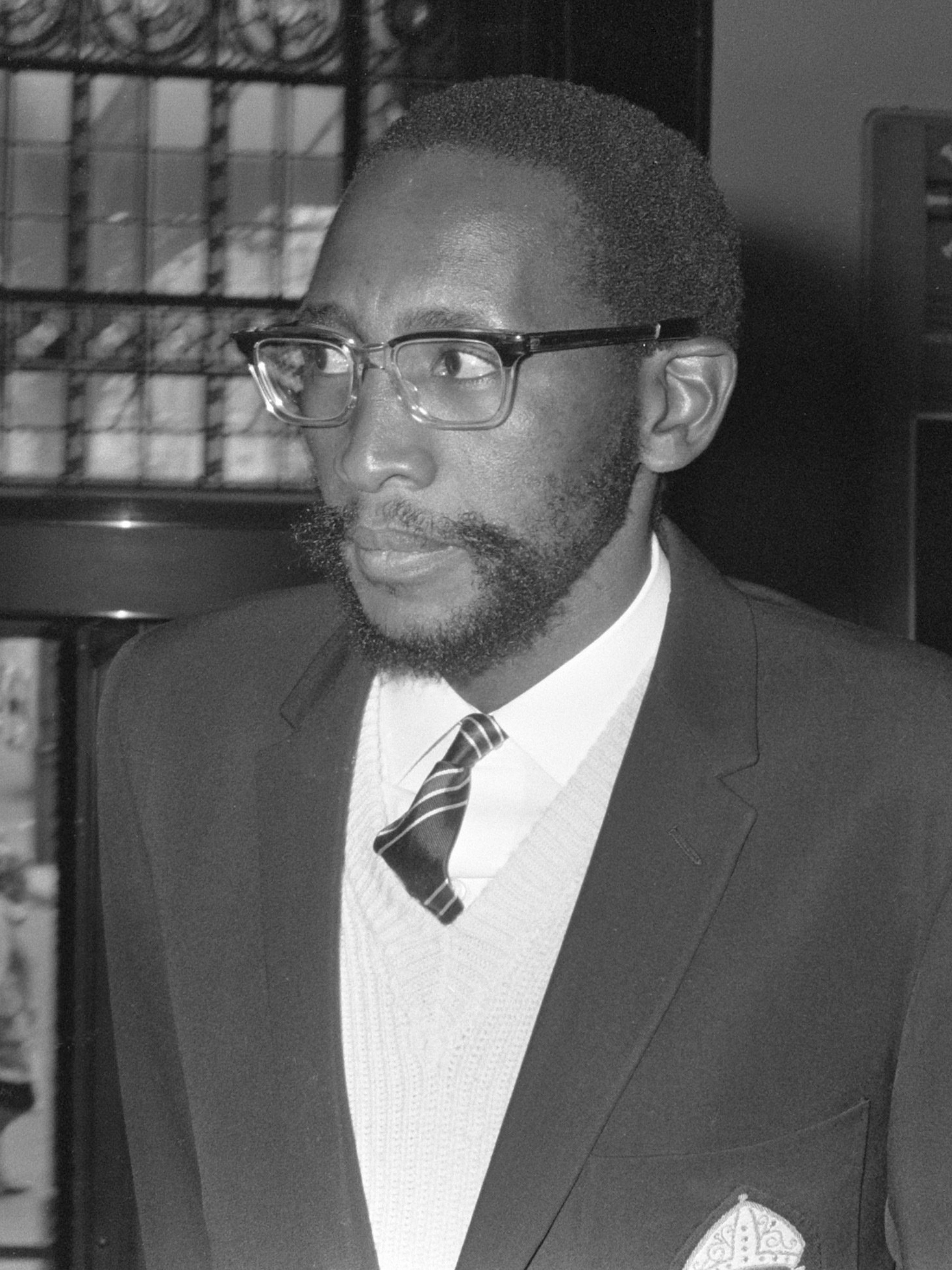
King Moshoeshoe II

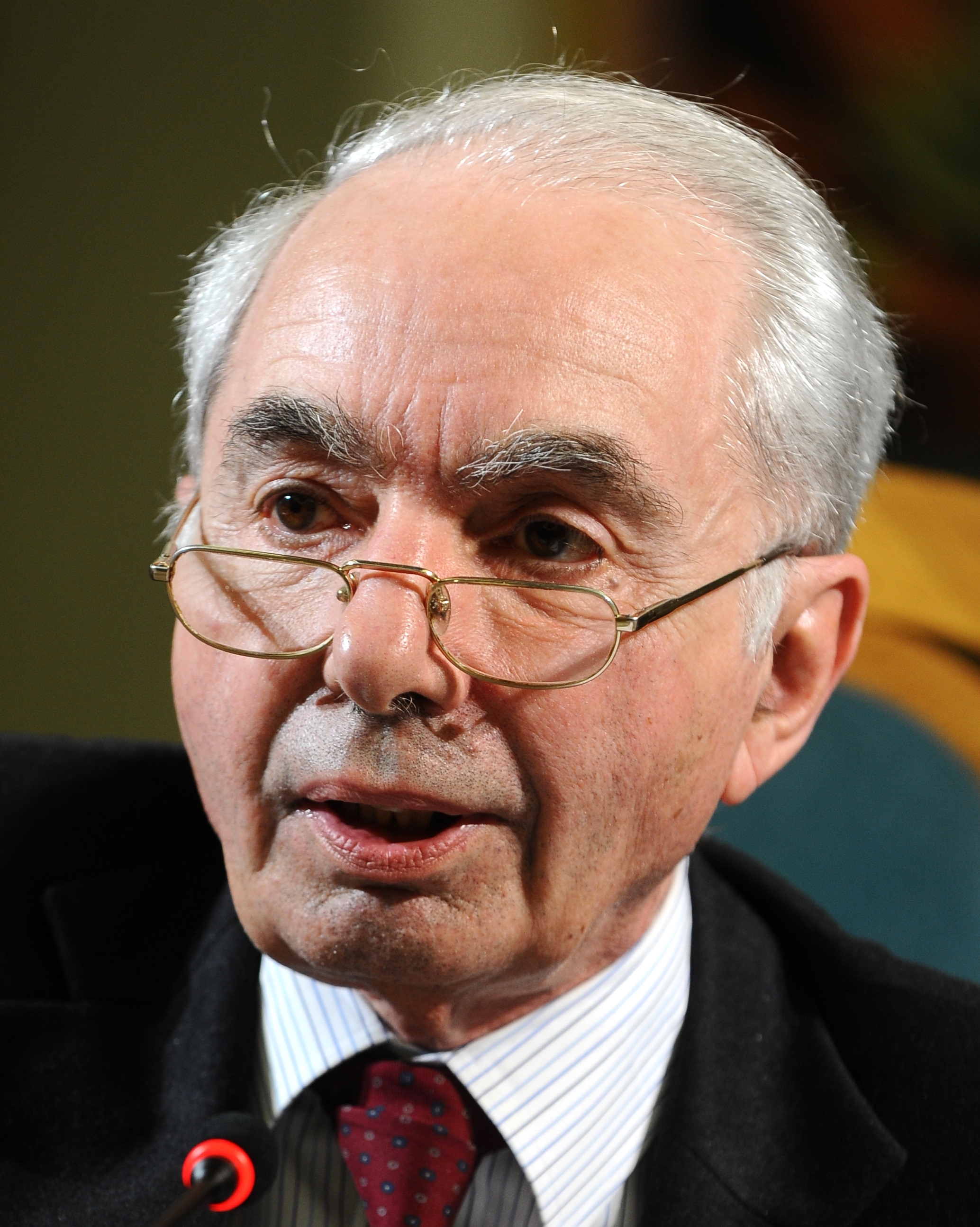
Giuliano Amato

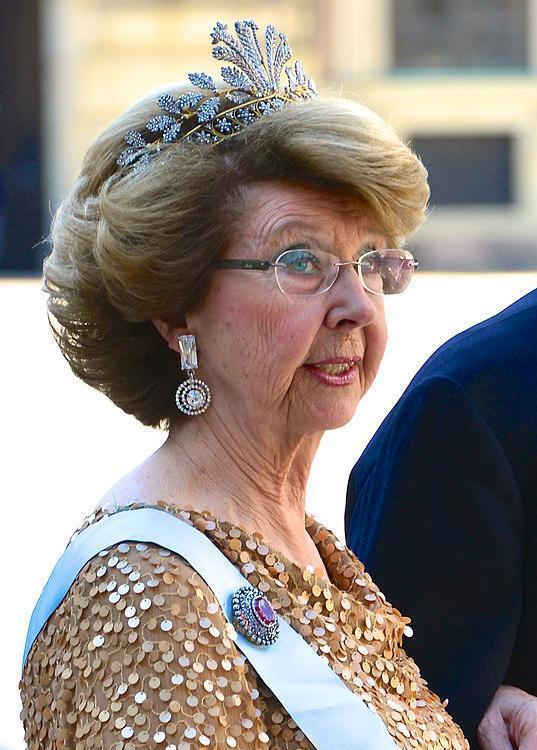
Princess Désirée

- May 2 – King Moshoeshoe II of Lesotho (d. 1996)
- May 13 – Giuliano Amato, 48th Prime Minister of Italy
- May 15 – Diane Nash, American civil rights movement activist
- May 16 – Marco Aurelio Denegri, Peruvian literature critic, television host and sexologist (d. 2018)
- May 19 – Girish Karnad, Indian actor, screenwriter and playwright (d. 2019)
- May 22 – Susan Strasberg, American actress (d. 1999)
- May 24 – Prince Buster, Jamaican singer-songwriter (d. 2016)
- May 26
  - William Bolcom, American composer and arranger
  - Teresa Stratas, Canadian operatic soprano
- May 28
  - Jerry West, American basketball player and executive (d. 2024)
  - Dale Bell, American TV producer
- June 2 – Princess Désirée, Baroness Silfverschiöld, Princess of Sweden (d. 2026)
- June 5 – Karin Balzer, German athlete (d. 2019)
- June 24 – Abulfaz Elchibey, Azerbaijani political figure, 2nd President of Azerbaijan (d. 2000)
- June 26 – Maria Velho da Costa, Portuguese writer (d. 2020)
- June 30 – Billy Mills, American Olympic athlete

=== July–August ===
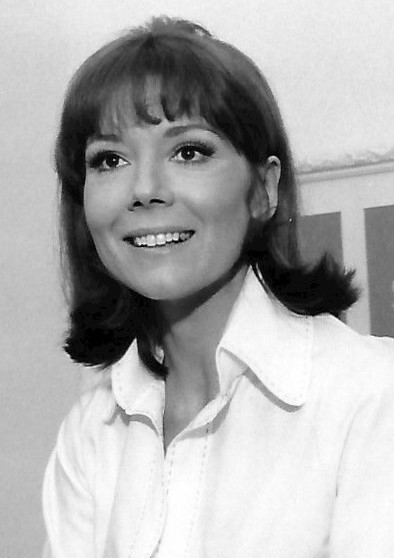
Diana Rigg

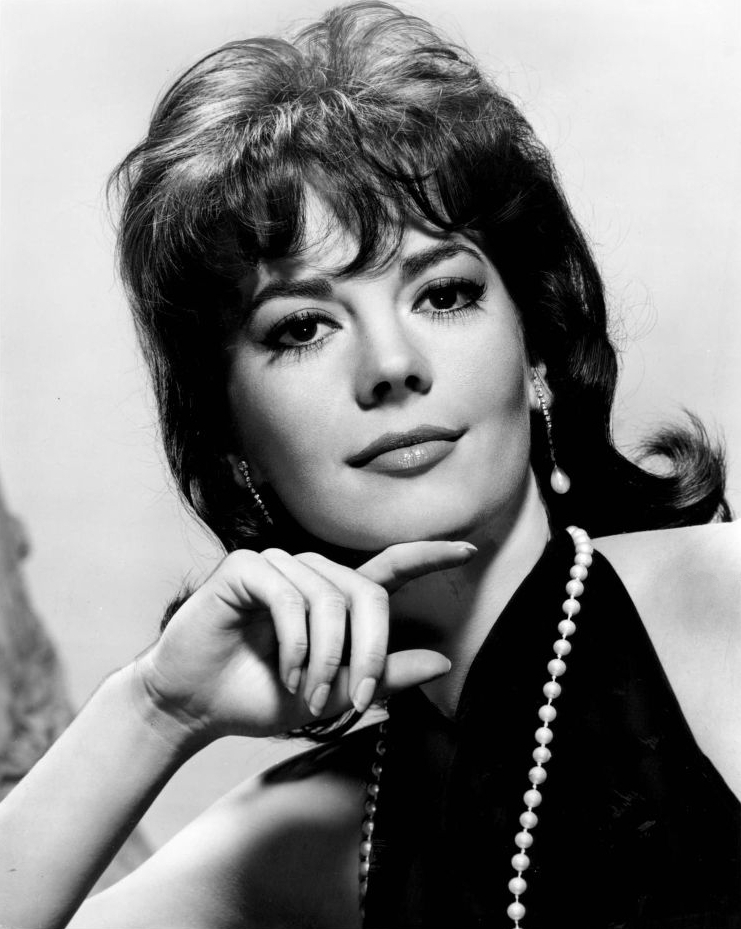
Natalie Wood

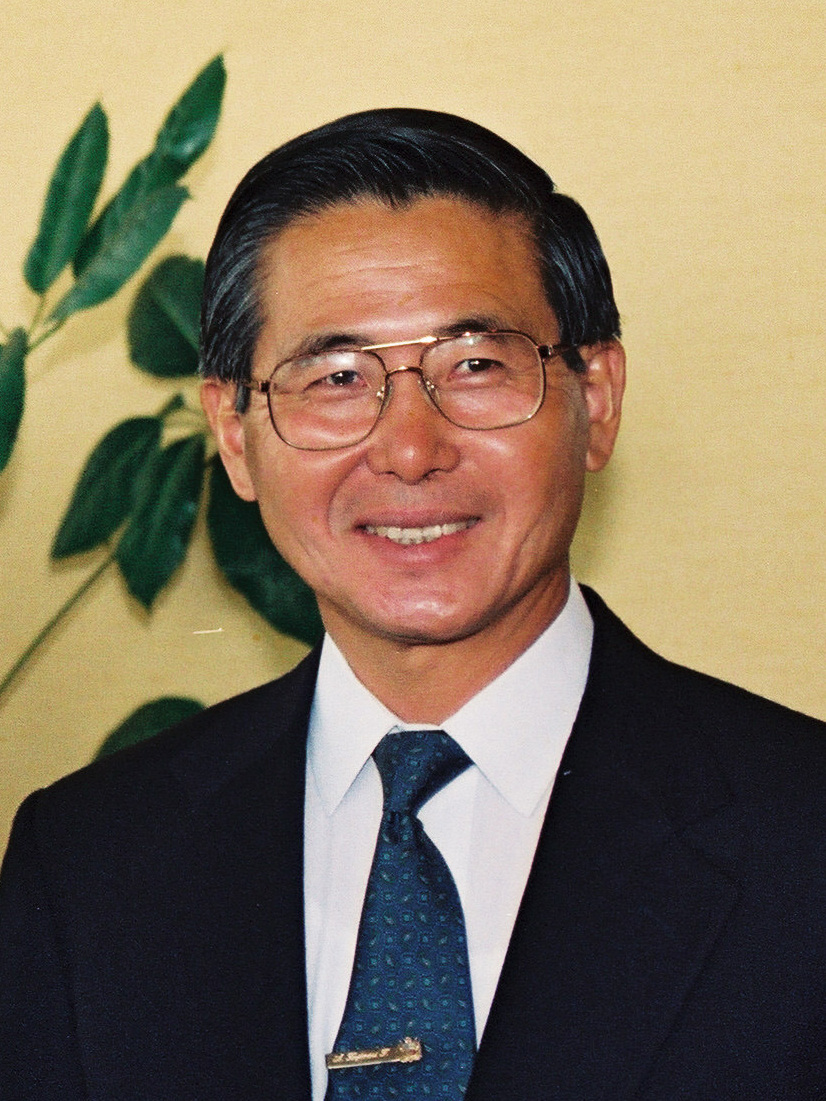
Alberto Fujimori

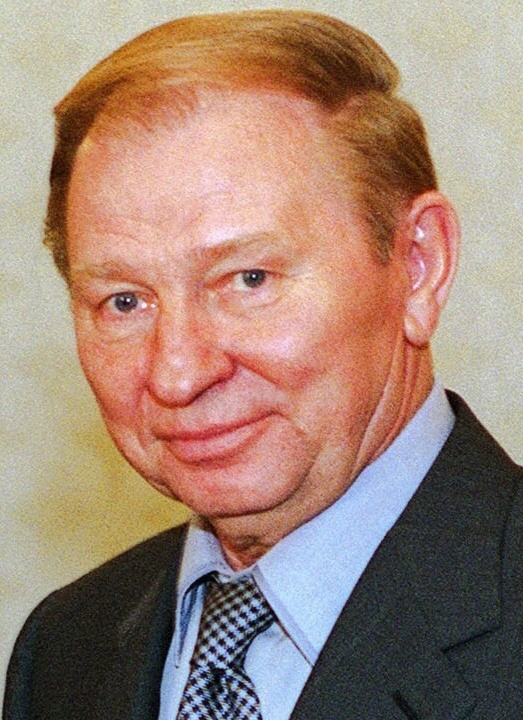
Leonid Kuchma

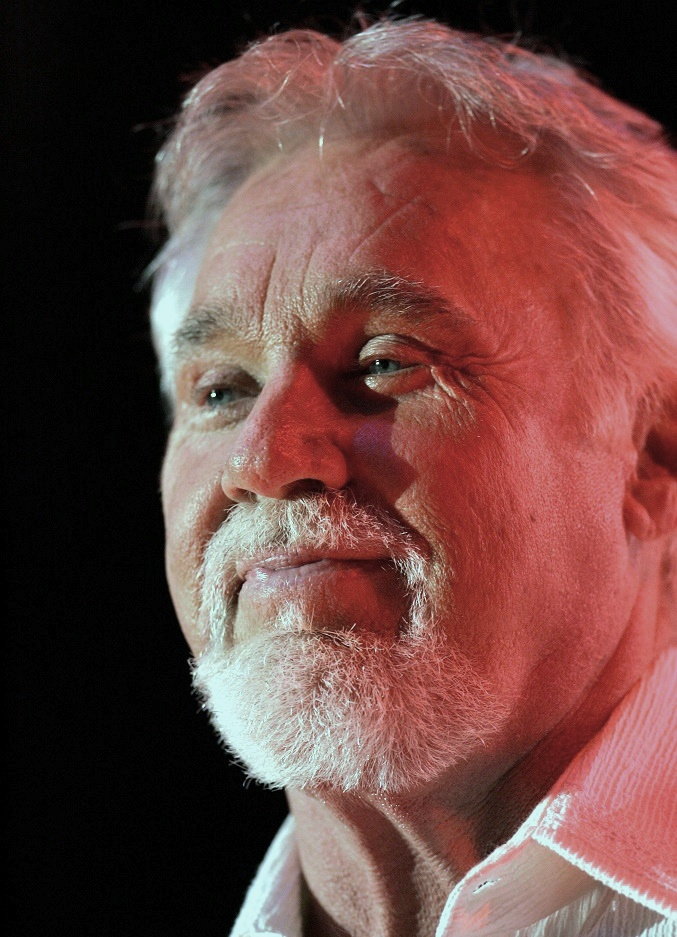
Kenny Rogers

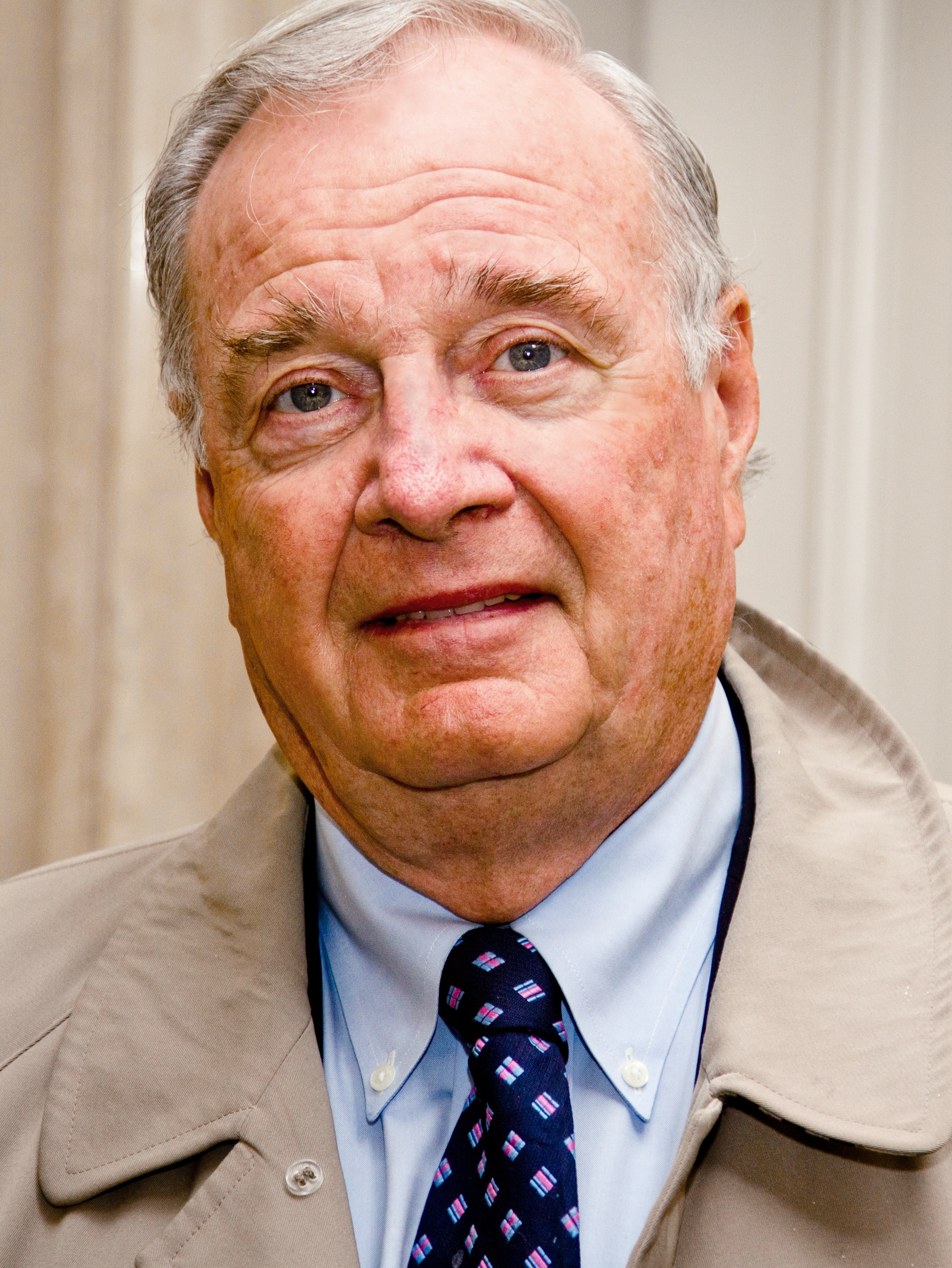
Paul Martin

- July 1 – Hariprasad Chaurasia, Indian classical flutist
- July 3 – Sjaak Swart, Dutch footballer
- July 4 – Bill Withers, African-American singer-songwriter (d. 2020)
- July 9 – Brian Dennehy, American actor (d. 2020)
- July 15 – Enrique Figuerola, Cuban sprinter
- July 18 – Paul Verhoeven, Dutch film director
- July 19 – Jayant Narlikar, Indian astrophysicist (d. 2025)
- July 20
  - Diana Rigg, English actress (d. 2020)
  - Natalie Wood, American actress (d. 1981)
- July 21 – Janet Reno, American lawyer, U.S. Attorney General under Bill Clinton (d. 2016)
- July 22 – Terence Stamp, English actor (d. 2025)
- July 27 – Gary Gygax, American author, game designer (d. 2008)
- July 28
  - Luis Aragonés, Spanish football player, manager (d. 2014)
  - Alberto Fujimori, Peruvian politician and dictator, President of Peru (d. 2024)
  - Chuan Leekpai, Thai politician, 20th Prime Minister of Thailand
- July 29 – Peter Jennings, Canadian-American journalist (d. 2005)
- August 1 – Edward Sokoine, 2nd Prime Minister of Tanzania (d. 1984)
- August 3 – Sir Terry Wogan, Irish radio broadcaster, television presenter/personality (d. 2016)
- August 4 – Jean Nguza Karl-i-Bond, Zairian politician (d. 2003)
- August 8 – Connie Stevens, American actress, singer and businesswoman
- August 9
  - Michèle Girardon, French actress (d. 1975)
  - Leonid Kuchma, President of Ukraine
  - Rod Laver, Australian tennis player
- August 11 – Nagat, Egyptian singer and actress
- August 14 – Bennie Muller, Dutch footballer (d. 2024)
- August 15
  - Stephen Breyer, former Associate Justice of the Supreme Court of the United States
  - Maxine Waters, US Representative
- August 16 – Emmanuel Rakotovahiny, 8th Prime Minister of Madagascar (d. 2020)
- August 19 – Valentin Mankin, Ukrainian Soviet sailor, Olympic triple champion and silver medalist (d. 2014)
- August 20
  - Jacqueline Andere, Mexican actress
  - Alain Vivien, French politician
- August 21 – Kenny Rogers, American country singer (d. 2020)
- August 25 – Frederick Forsyth, English novelist (d. 2025)
- August 28 – Paul Martin, 21st Prime Minister of Canada
- August 29
  - Elliott Gould, American actor
  - Robert Rubin, 70th US Treasury Secretary

=== September–October ===
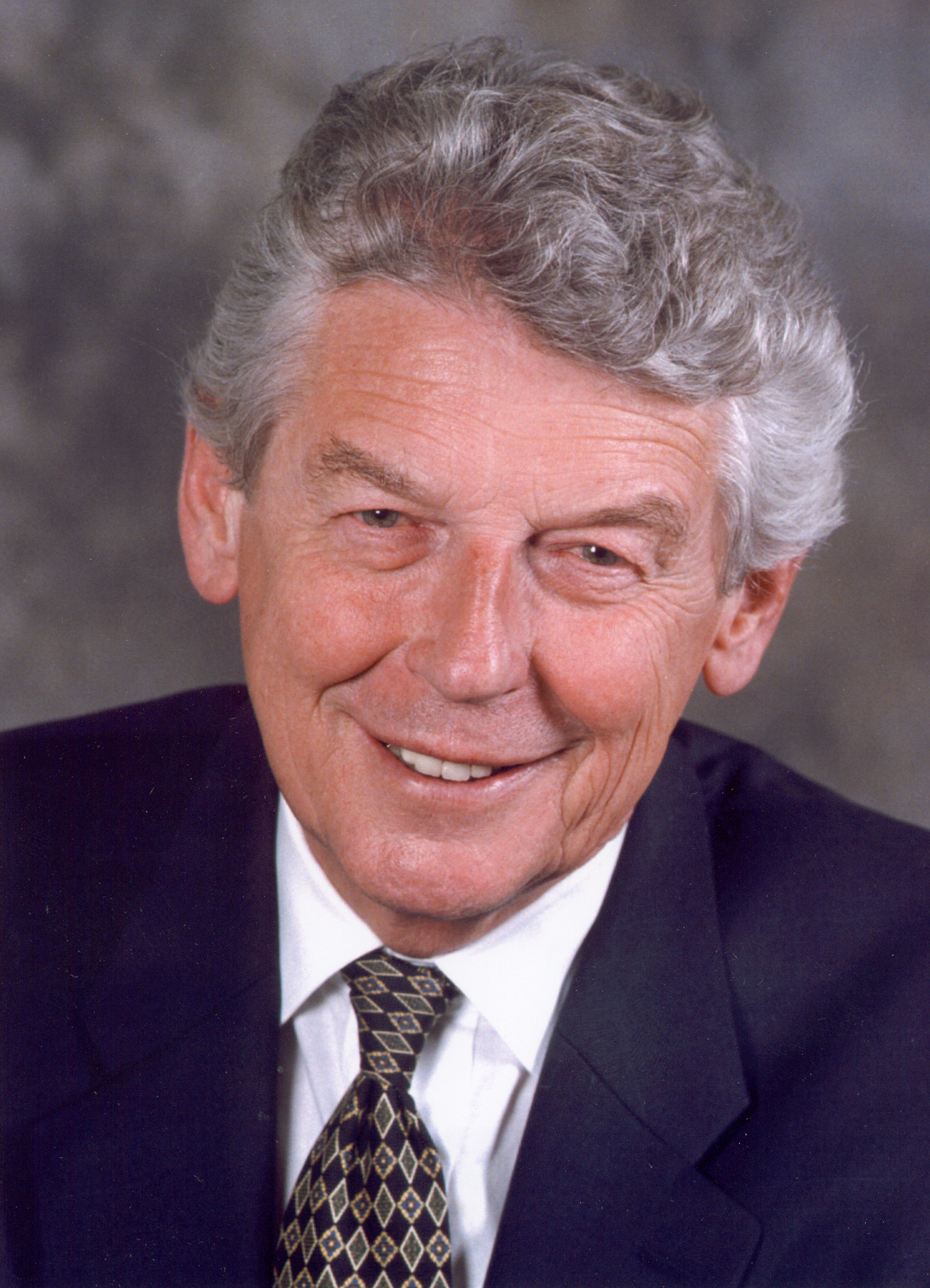
Wim Kok

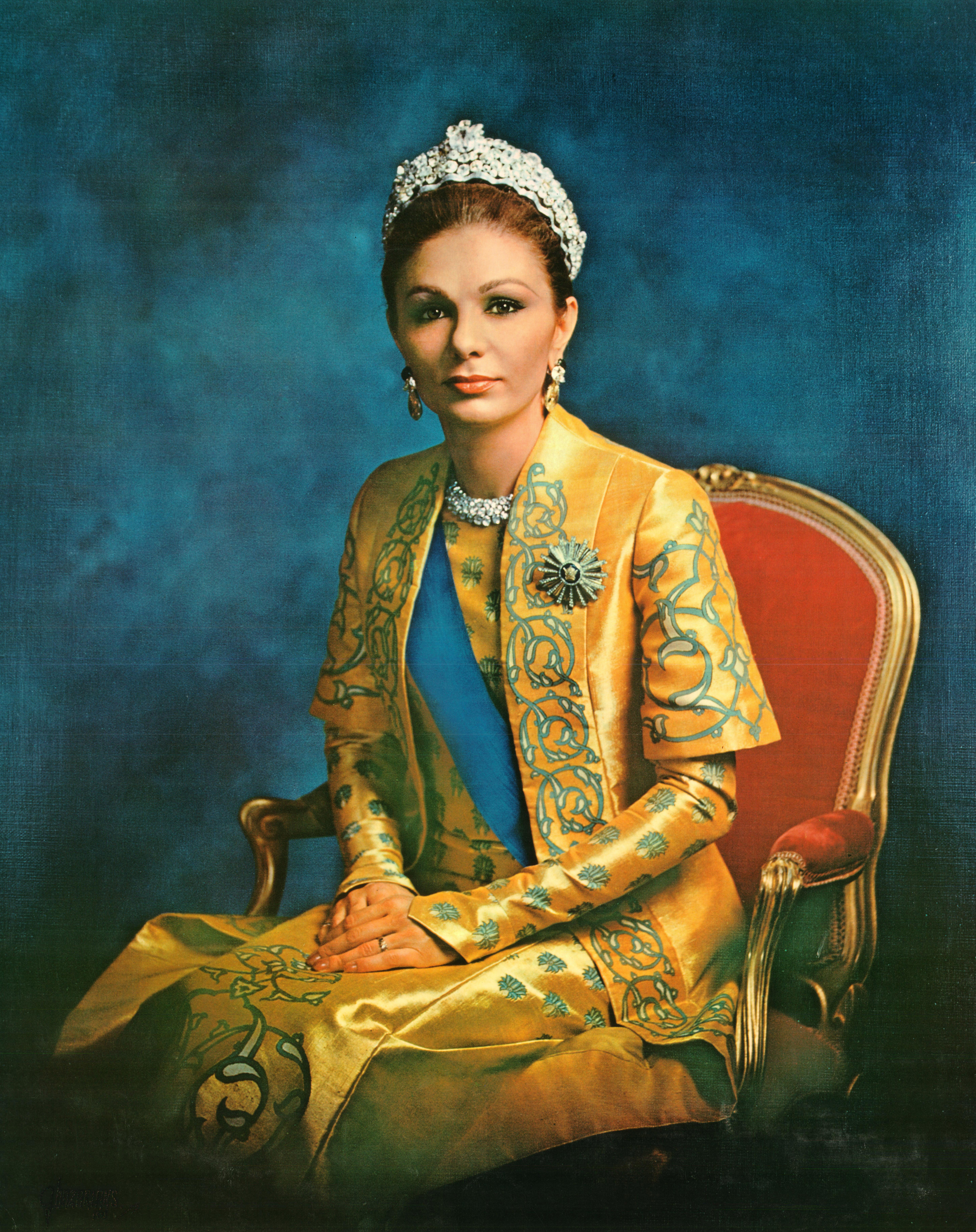
Farah Diba

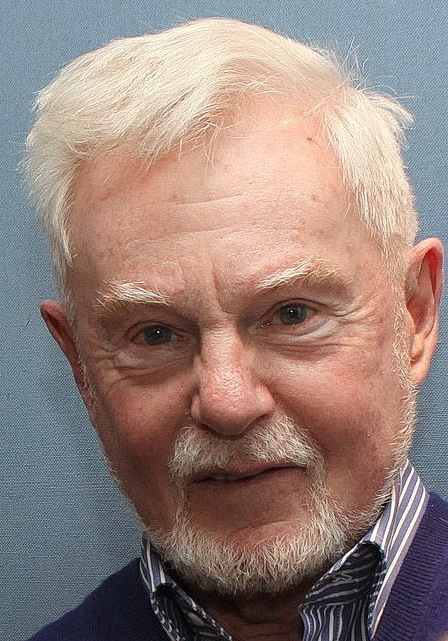
Derek Jacobi

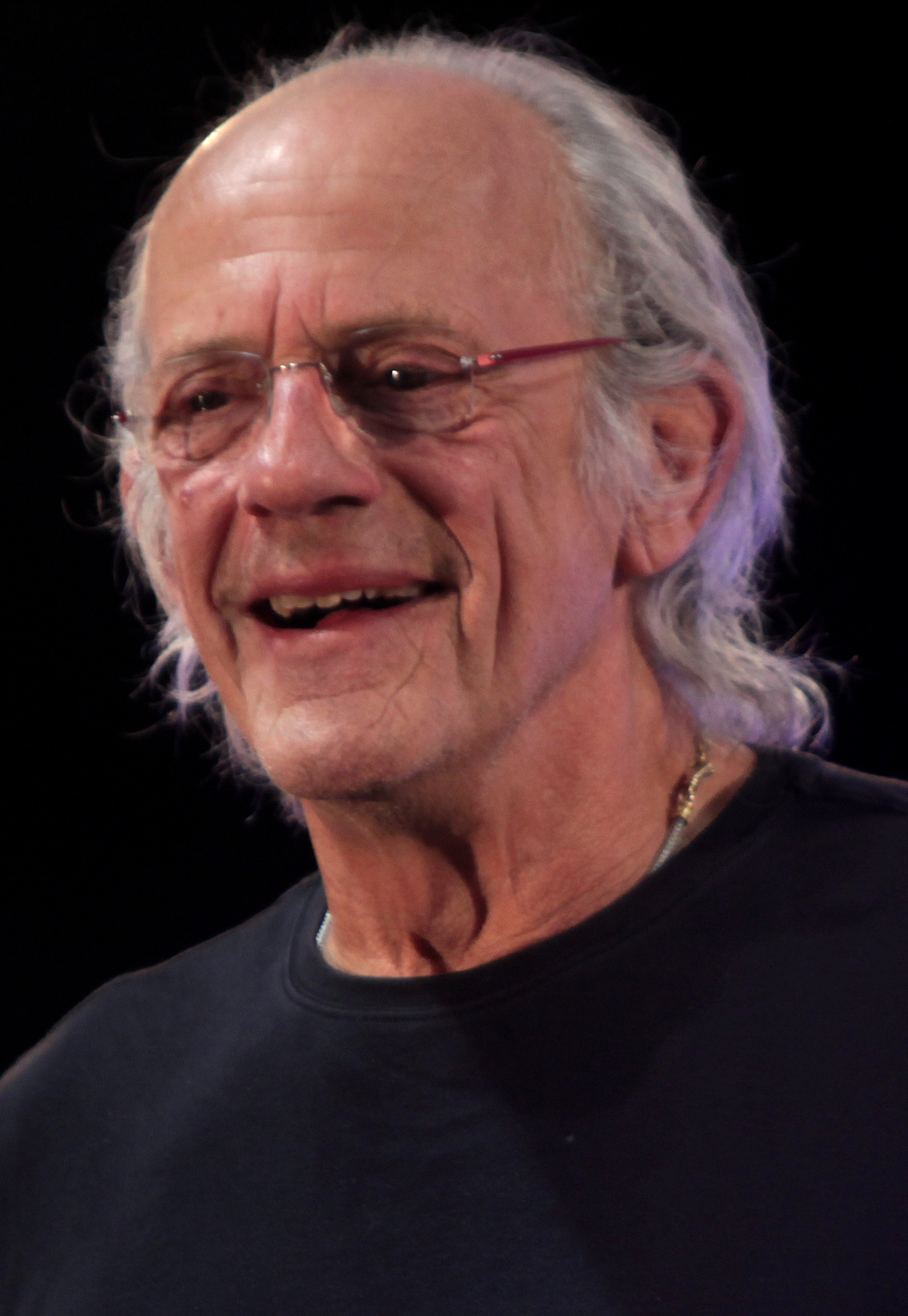
Christopher Lloyd

- September 1 – Alan Dershowitz, American lawyer and academic
- September 2 – Giuliano Gemma, Italian actor (d. 2013)
- September 3 – Ryōji Noyori, Japanese chemist, Nobel laureate
- September 6 – Dennis Oppenheim, American artist (d. 2011)
- September 10 – Tomasi Puapua, Tuvaluan politician, 2nd Prime Minister of Tuvalu and 6th Governor-General of Tuvalu
- September 23 – Romy Schneider, German-French actress (d. 1982)
- September 25
  - Celestino Rocha da Costa, 2nd Prime Minister of São Tomé and Príncipe (d. 2010)
  - Jonathan Motzfeldt, Prime Minister of Greenland (d. 2010)
- September 28 – Ben E. King, American singer-songwriter (d. 2015)
- September 29 – Wim Kok, Dutch politician, 48th Prime Minister of the Netherlands from 1994 until 2002 (d. 2018)
- October 1 – Stella Stevens, American actress and model (d. 2023)
- October 3
  - Eddie Cochran, American rock and roll singer (d. 1960)
  - Pedro Pablo Kuczynski, Peruvian entrepreneur and politician, 66th President of Peru
- October 4 – Kurt Wüthrich, Swiss chemist, Nobel Prize laureate
- October 8 – Bronislovas Lubys, 5th Prime Minister of Lithuania (d. 2011)
- October 14 – Farah Diba, Empress of Iran
- October 15 – Fela Kuti, Nigerian musician, activist (d. 1997)
- October 16 – Nico, German-American singer (d. 1988)
- October 17 – Evel Knievel, American motorcycle daredevil (d. 2007)
- October 18 – Dawn Wells, American actress (d. 2020)
- October 22
  - Derek Jacobi, English actor and director
  - Christopher Lloyd, American actor
- October 29
  - Ralph Bakshi, Israeli cartoonist, film director, and video producer
  - Ellen Johnson Sirleaf, 24th President of Liberia

=== November–December ===
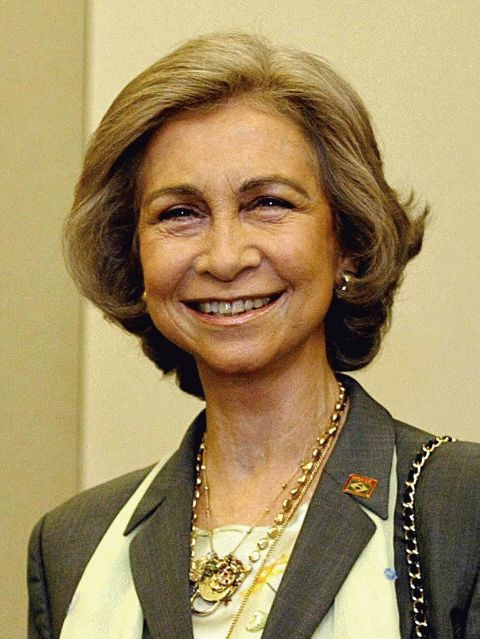
Queen Sofía of Spain

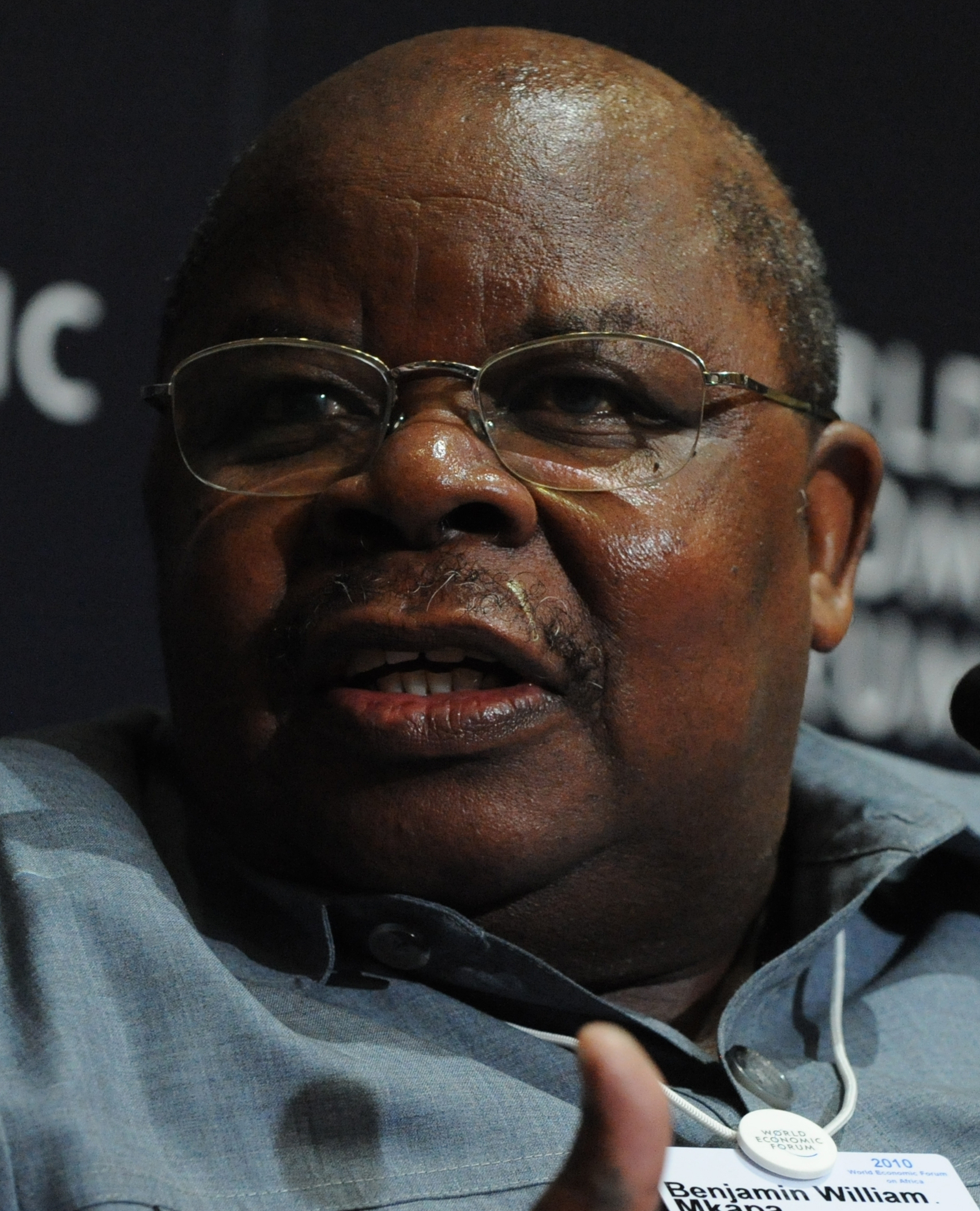
Benjamin Mkapa

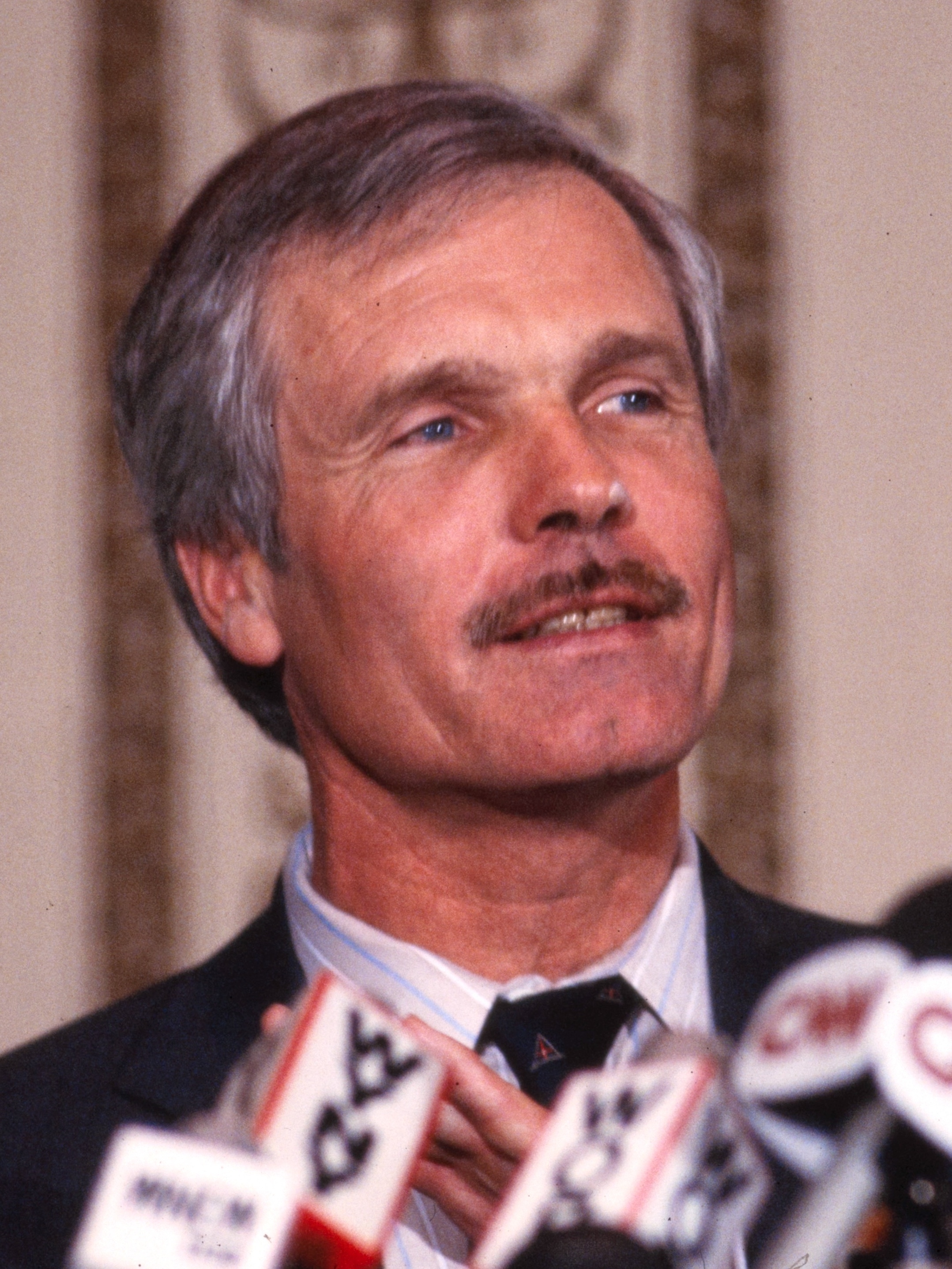
Ted Turner

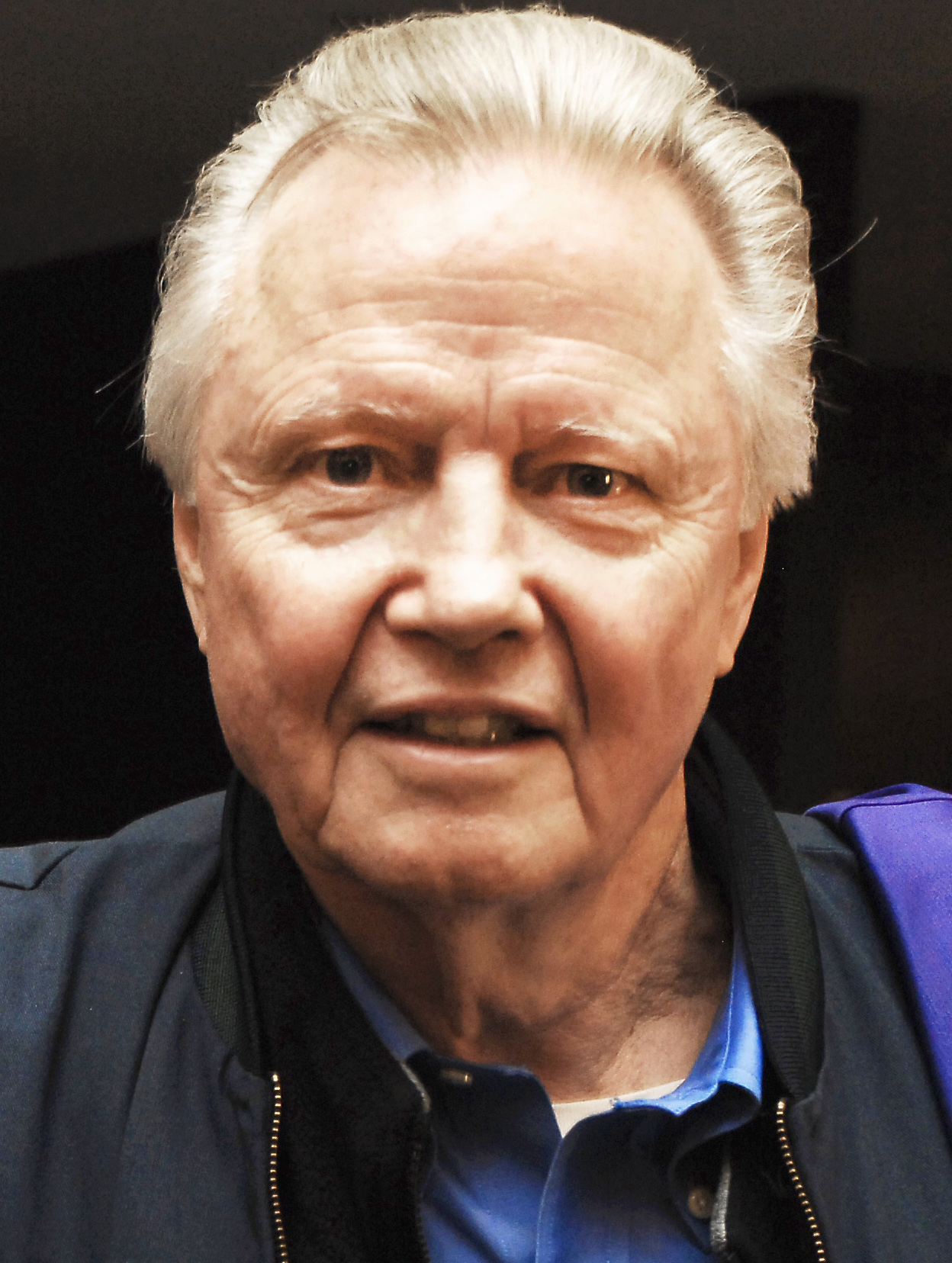
Jon Voight

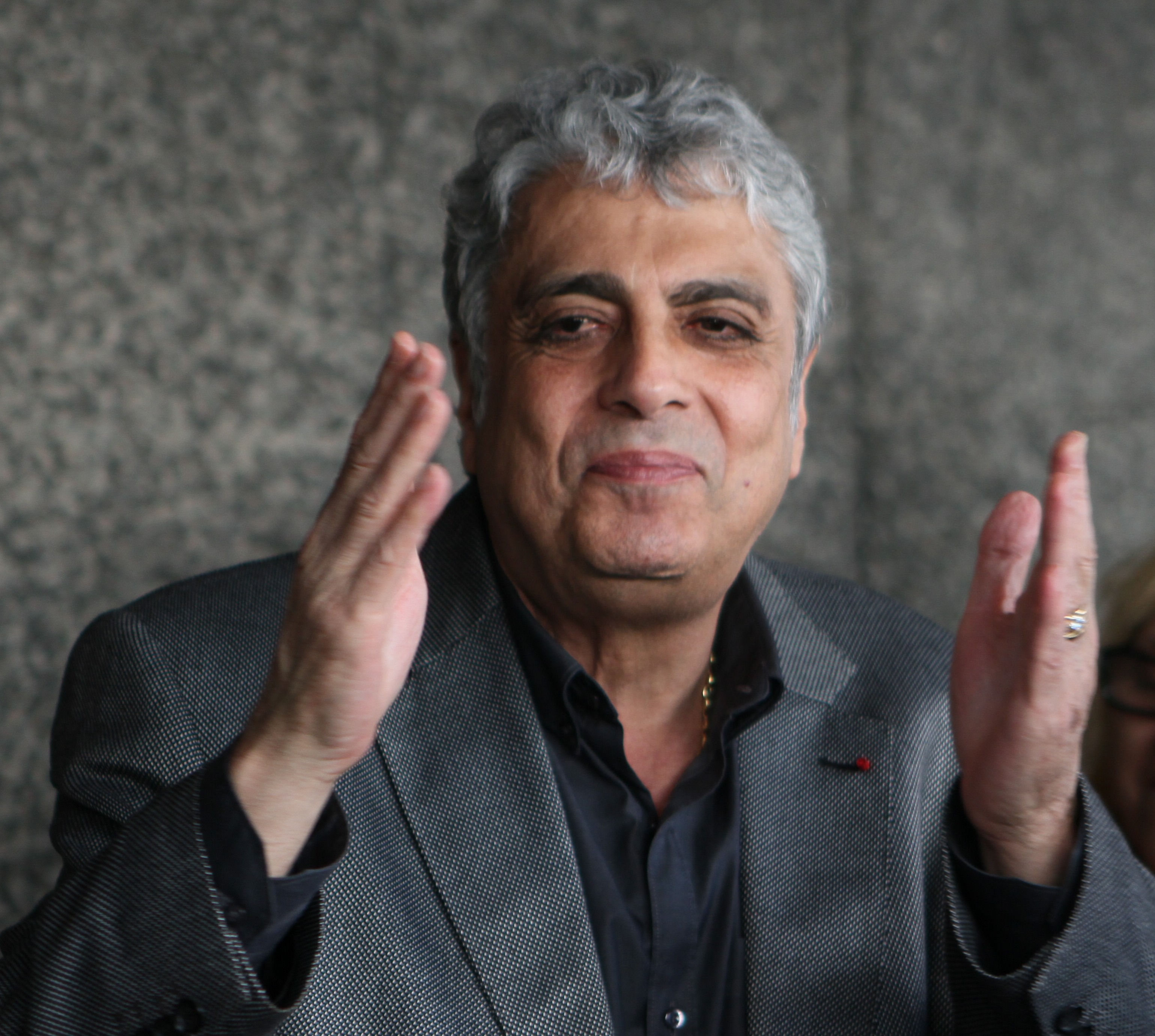
Enrico Macias

- November 2
  - Pat Buchanan, American conservative political operative, journalist, pundit and one-time presidential candidate
  - Queen Sofía of Spain
- November 5
  - Joe Dassin, French singer (d. 1980)
  - Ionatana Ionatana, 5th Prime Minister of Tuvalu (d. 2000)
  - César Luis Menotti, Argentine football coach (d. 2024)
- November 8 – Satch Sanders, American basketball player
- November 12 – Benjamin Mkapa, 3rd President of Tanzania (d. 2020)
- November 13 – Jean Seberg, American actress (d. 1979)
- November 16 – Robert Nozick, American philosopher (d. 2002)
- November 17 – Gordon Lightfoot, Canadian folk singer-songwriter (d. 2023)
- November 18
  - Ahmad Obeidat, Prime Minister of Jordan (d. 2026)
  - Norbert Ratsirahonana, 9th Prime Minister of Madagascar
- November 19 – Ted Turner, American entrepreneur and cable television pioneer (d. 2026)
- November 21 – Helen, Indian actress and dancer
- November 24 – Oscar Robertson, African-American basketball player
- December 5 – J. J. Cale, American singer-songwriter, guitarist (d. 2013)
- December 8 – John Kofi Agyekum Kufuor, President of Ghana
- December 13 – Heino, German singer
- December 15 – Juan Carlos Wasmosy, 48th President of Paraguay
- December 16 – Liv Ullmann, Norwegian actress
- December 17 – Peter Snell, New Zealand athlete (d. 2019)
- December 28 – Lagumot Harris, Nauruan politician, President (d. 1999)
- December 29 – Jon Voight, American actor

=== Date unknown ===
- Sidi Ould Cheikh Abdallahi, 7th President of Mauritania (d. 2020)
- Tafazzul Haque Habiganji, Bangladeshi Islamic scholar and politician (d. 2020)

== Deaths ==
=== January ===
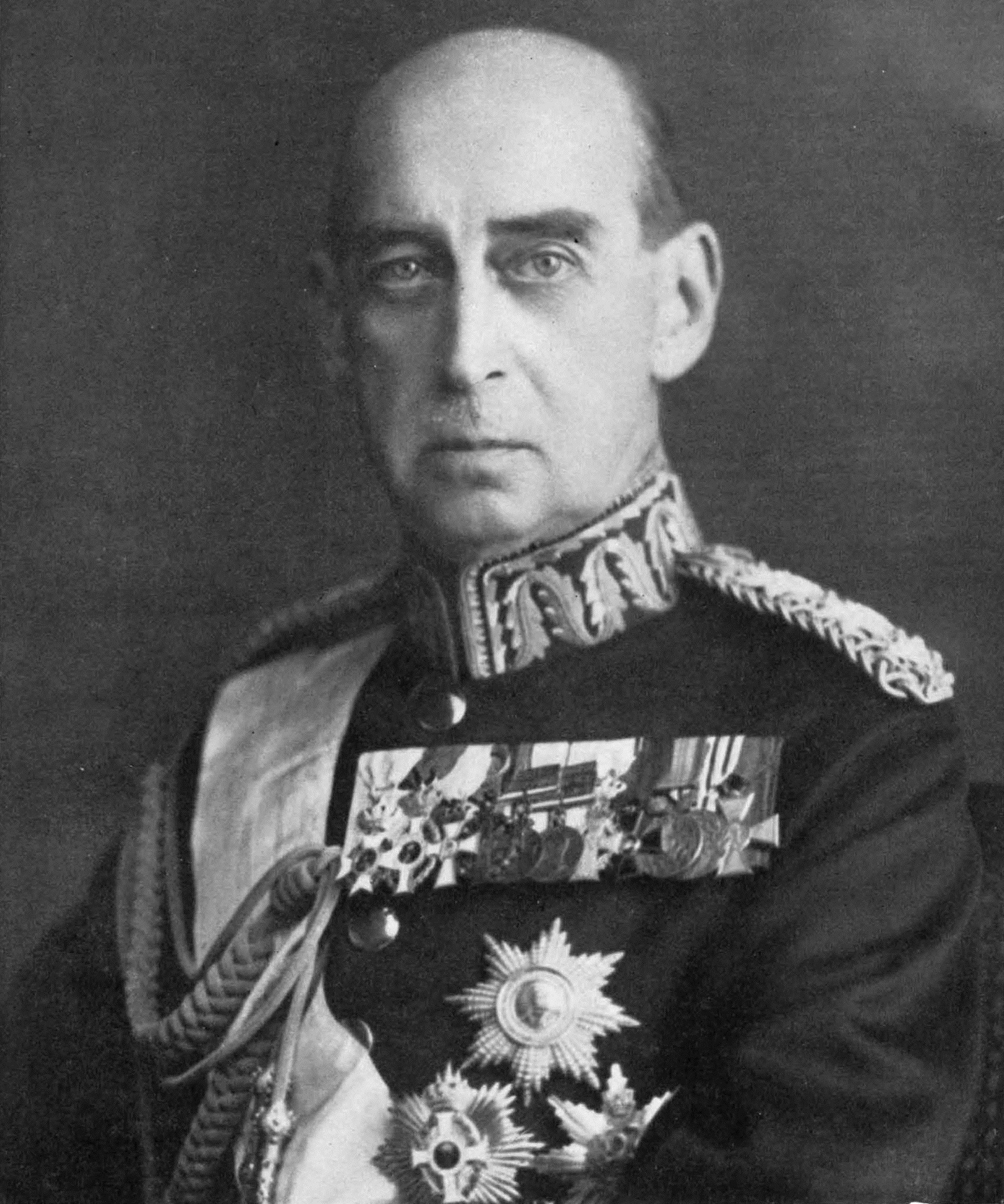
Prince Nicholas of Greece and Denmark

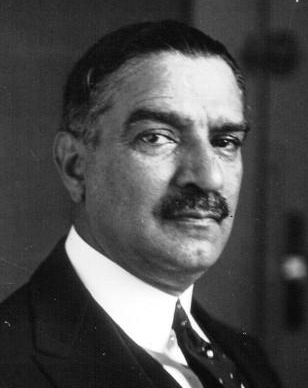
Andreas Michalakopoulos

- January 4 – Paola Drigo, Italian novelist (b. 1876)
- January 5 – Karel Baxa, Czech politician (b. 1863)
- January 6 – Protógenes Guimarães, Brazilian admiral and politician (b. 1876)
- January 8 – Christian Rohlfs, German painter (b. 1849)
- January 9 – Johnny Gruelle, American cartoonist and children's book author (b. 1880)
- January 11 – Isidore Konti, Austrian-born Hungarian sculptor (b. 1862)
- January 14 – Jaakko Mäki, Finnish politician (b. 1878)
- January 17 – Vladimir Beneshevich, Soviet scholar, martyr (executed) (b. 1874)
- January 20
  - Émile Cohl, French caricaturist, animator (b. 1857)
  - Liu Xiang, Chinese general (b. 1890)
- January 21 – Georges Méliès, French film director (b. 1861)
- January 22 – Sergei Buturlin, Soviet ornithologist (b. 1872)
- January 23 – J. P. Dahlén, Swedish worker, politician (b. 1881)
- January 28 – Bernd Rosemeyer, German racing driver (b. 1909)
- January 29 – Armando Palacio Valdés, Spanish writer (b. 1853)
- January 31 – Marcella Cosgrave, Irish nationalist leader (b. 1873)

=== February ===
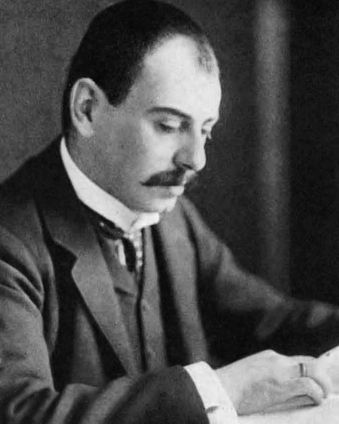
Edmund Landau

- February 3 – Howard Gould, American actor (b. 1863)
- February 6 – George Auriol, French poet (b. 1863)
- February 7 – Harvey Firestone, American tire manufacturer (b. 1868)
- February 8 – Prince Nicholas of Greece and Denmark (b. 1872)
- February 9 – Arturo Caprotti, Italian engineer, architect (b. 1881)
- February 11
  - Kalle Korhonen, Finnish politician (executed) (b. 1878)
  - Kazimierz Twardowski, Polish philosopher, logician (b. 1866)
- February 18 – Leopoldo Lugones, Argentine writer, journalist (b. 1874)
- February 19 – Edmund Landau, German mathematician (b. 1877)
- February 21 – Matvei Petrovich Bronstein, Soviet physicist (executed) (b. 1906)

=== March ===
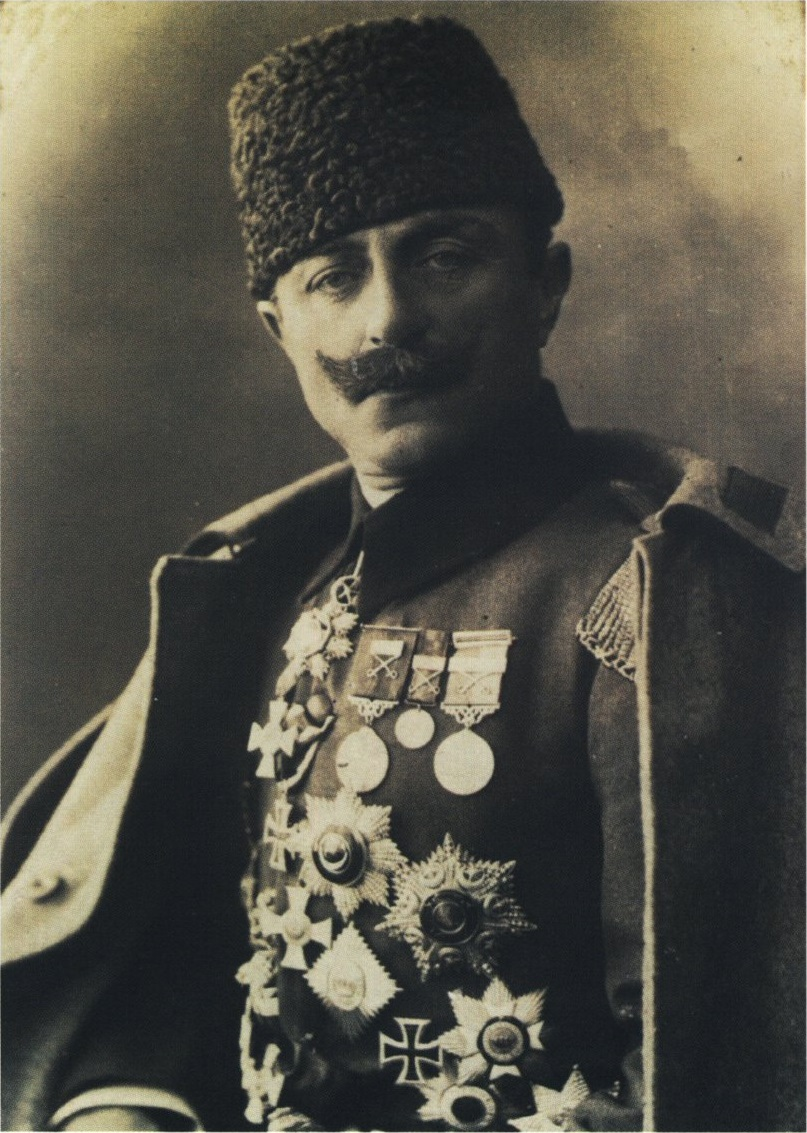
Cevat Çobanlı

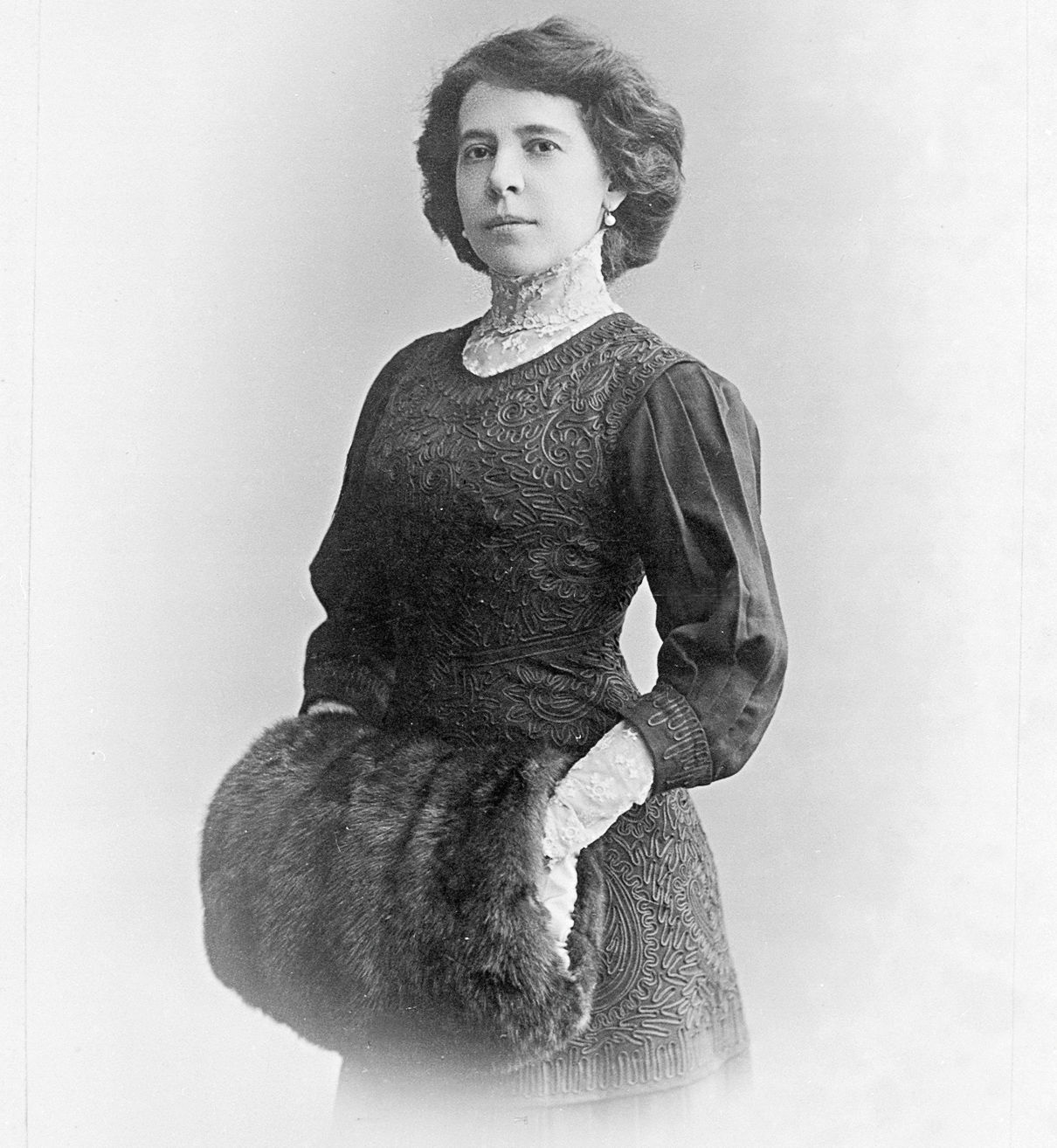
Lidia Charskaya

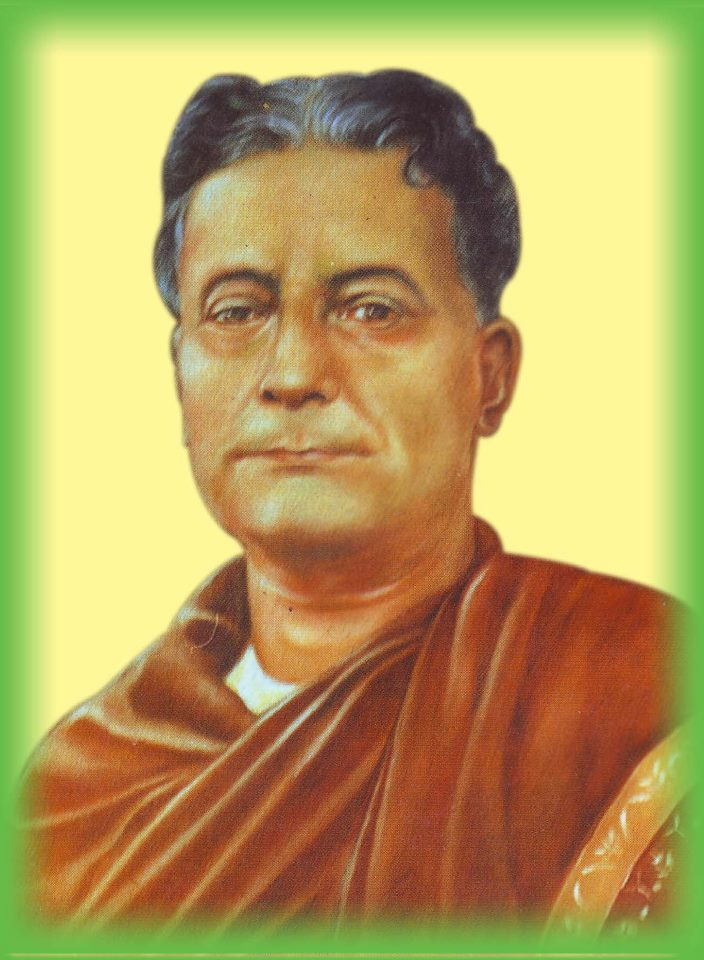
Lakshminath Bezbaroa

- March 1 – Gabriele D'Annunzio, Italian writer, war hero, and politician (b. 1863)
- March 2 – William Blomfield, New Zealand cartoonist (b. 1866)
- March 7 – Andreas Michalakopoulos, Greek politician, 47th Prime Minister of Greece (b. 1876)
- March 10 – Ahn Changho, Korean independence activist (b. 1878)
- March 12 – Lyda Roberti, Polish actress (b. 1906)
- March 13
  - Cevat Çobanlı, Ottoman military commander, Turkish army officer (b. 1870)
  - Clarence Darrow, American attorney (b. 1857)
- March 14 – Wang Mingzhang, Chinese general of the National Revolutionary Army (b. 1893)
- March 15
  - Alexei Rykov, Premier of Russia and Premier of the Soviet Union (executed) (b. 1881)
  - Nikolai Bukharin, Soviet politician (executed) (b. 1888)
  - Genrikh Yagoda, Soviet police and intelligence official (executed) (b. 1891)
- March 18 – Lidia Charskaya, Soviet actress, writer (b. 1875)
- March 19 – Magzhan Zhumabayev, Soviet writer, pedagogue (b. 1893)
- March 20
  - Martin Burrell, Canadian politician (b. 1858)
  - Aleksandar Malinov, 17th Prime Minister of Bulgaria (b. 1867)
- March 26 – Lakshminath Bezbaroa, Indian writer, dramatist, novelist, poet and editor (b. 1864)
- March 27
  - William Stern, German psychologist, philosopher (b. 1871)
  - Helen M. Winslow, American editor, author, and publisher (b. 1851)
- March 28 – Zheng Xiaoxu, Chinese statesman, diplomat and calligrapher, first Prime Minister of Manchukuo (b. 1860)
- March 29 – Marcel Bloch, Swiss aviator (b. 1890)

=== April ===
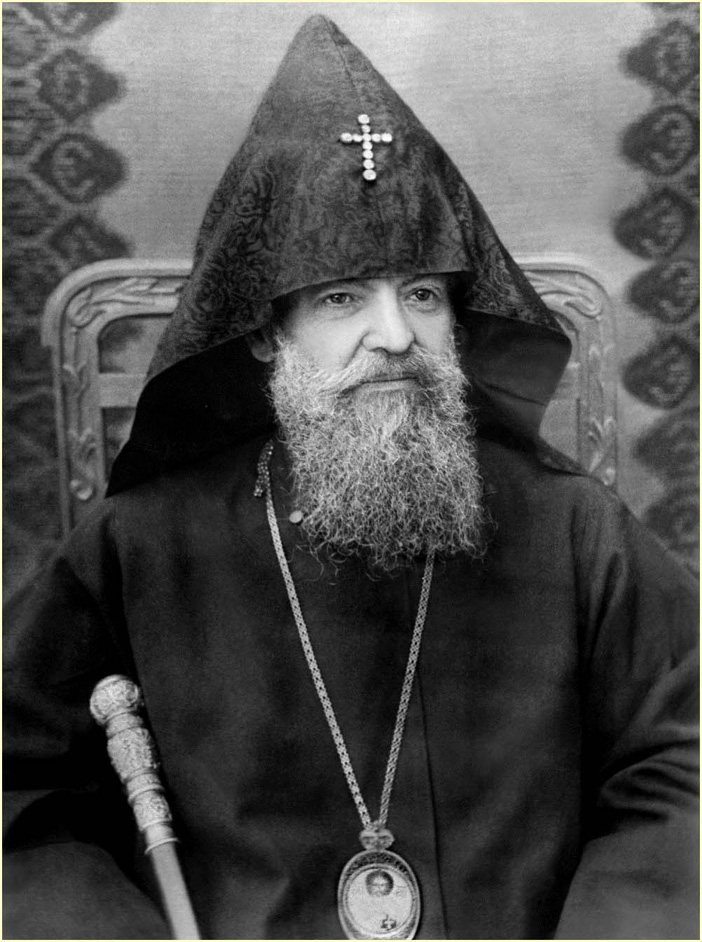
Patriarch Khoren I of Armenia

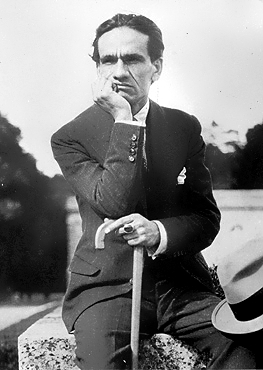
César Vallejo

- April 1 – Louis-Henri Foreau, French painter (b. 1866)
- April 2 – Hermanus Johannes Lovink, Dutch agriculturist and politician (b. 1866)
- April 6 – Khoren I of Armenia, Catholicos of the Armenian Apostolic Church and patriarch (b. 1873)
- April 8 – King Oliver, American jazz musician (b. 1885)
- April 9 – Manuel Carrasco Formiguera, Spanish lawyer, politician (b. 1890)
- April 12 – Feodor Chaliapin, Soviet bass (b. 1873)
- April 14 – Gillis Grafström, Swedish figure skater (b. 1893)
- April 15 – César Vallejo, Peruvian poet (b. 1892)
- April 16 – Steve Bloomer, English footballer (b. 1874)
- April 17 – Viktor Graf von Scheuchenstuel, Austro-Hungarian general (b. 1857)
- April 21
  - Sultan Majid Afandiyev, Soviet revolutionary, statesman (b. 1887)
  - Sir Muhammad Iqbal, Indian philosopher, poet (b. 1877)
- April 25 – Aleksander Świętochowski, Polish writer (b. 1849)
- April 27 – Edmund Husserl, Austrian philosopher (b. 1859)

=== May ===
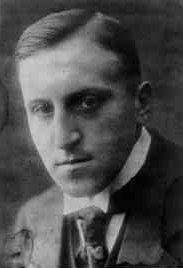
Carl von Ossietzky

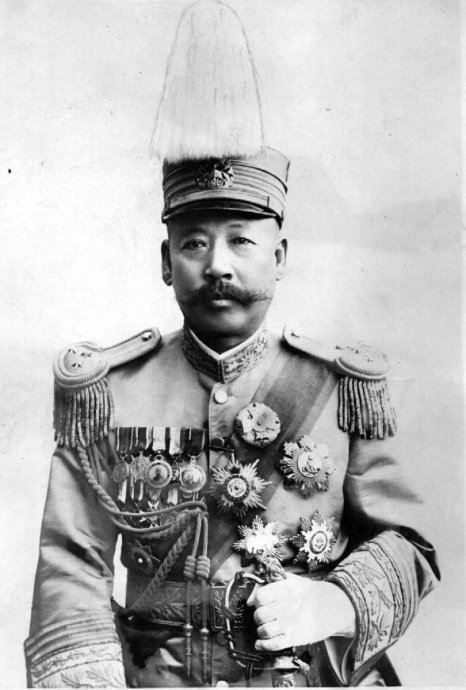
Cao Kun

- May 4 – Carl von Ossietzky, German pacifist, recipient of the Nobel Peace Prize (b. 1889)
- May 6 – Victor Cavendish, 9th Duke of Devonshire, British politician and Governor General of Canada (b. 1868)
- May 7 – Octavian Goga, 37th Prime Minister of Romania (b. 1881)
- May 13 – Charles Édouard Guillaume, French physicist, Nobel Prize laureate (b. 1861)
- May 14 – Miguel Cabanellas, Spanish army officer (b. 1872)
- May 15 – Cao Kun, 6th President of the Republic of China (b. 1862)
- May 16 – Ivan Mrkvička, Czech-born Bulgarian painter (b. 1856)
- May 18 – Mikhail Babushkin, Soviet polar aviator (b. 1893)
- May 26 – John Jacob Abel, American pharmacologist (b. 1857)
- May 29 – Miguel Fleta, Spanish tenor (b. 1897)

=== June ===
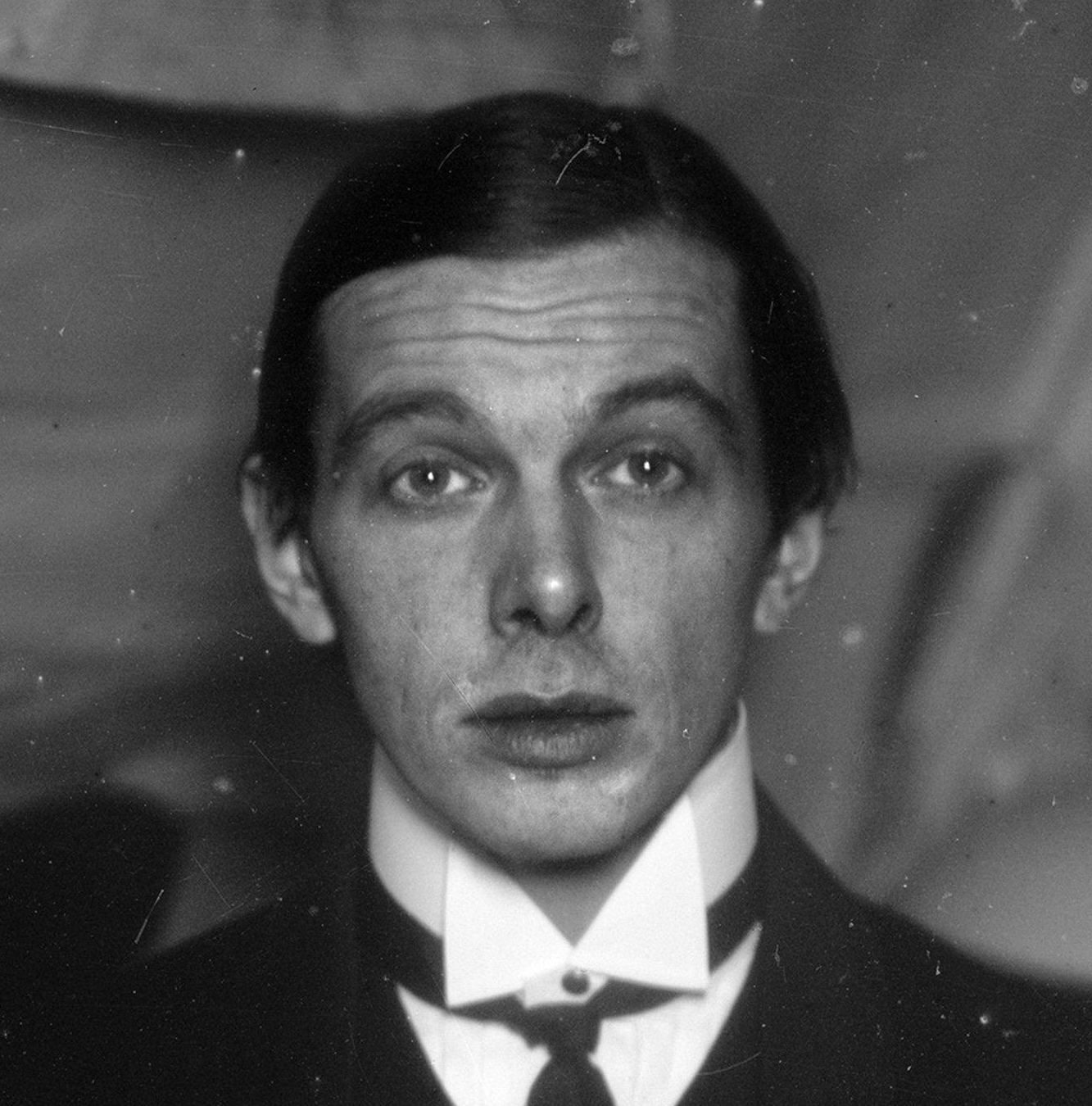
Ernst Ludwig Kirchner

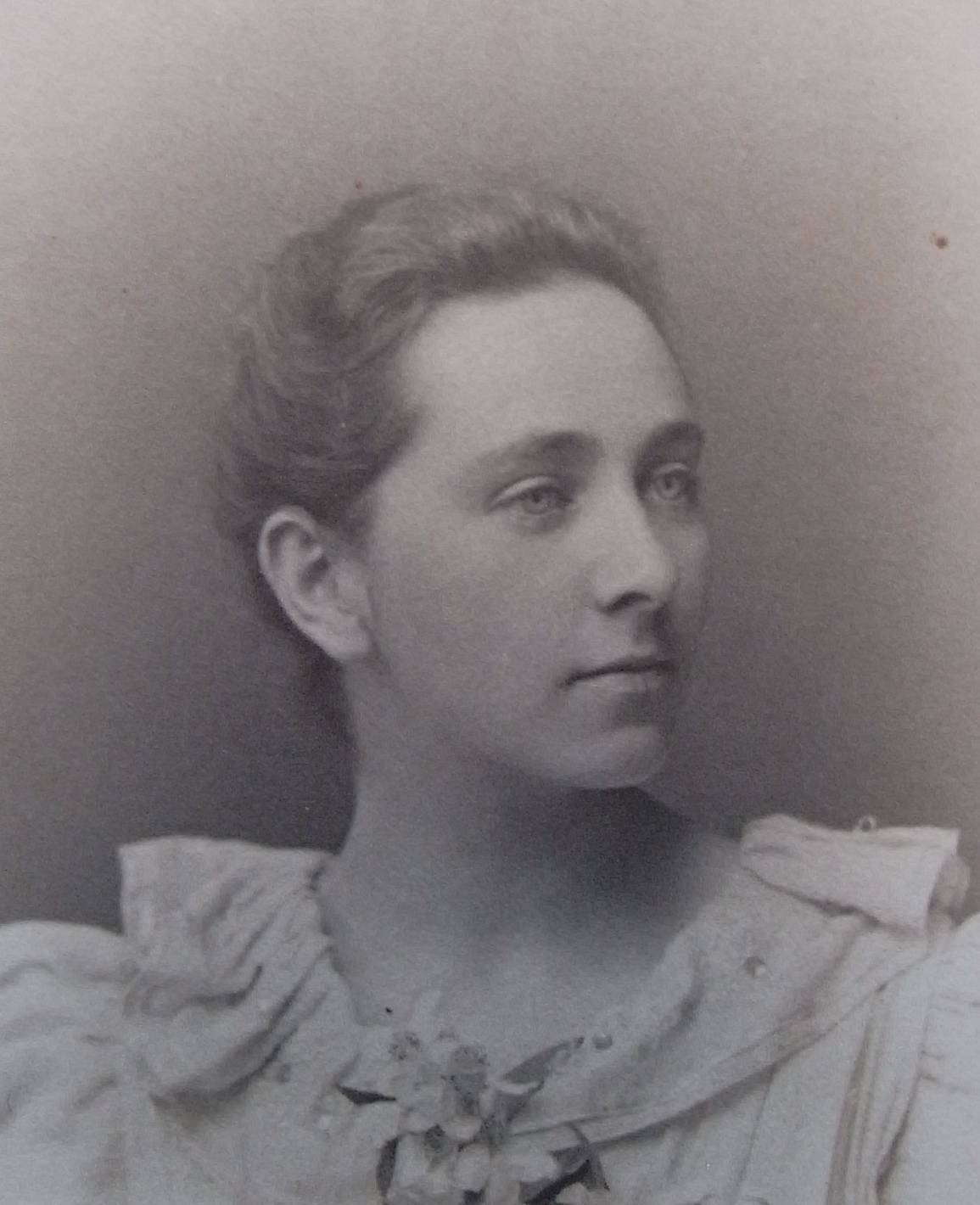
Edith Anne Stoney

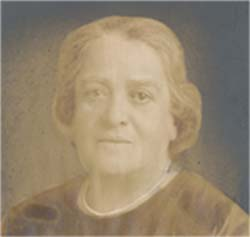
María Obligado de Soto y Calvo

- June 3 – Tulio Febres Cordero, Venezuelan writer, journalist (b. 1860)
- June 4 – Oscar Bystrom, Swedish actor (b. 1857)
- June 7 – Jenő Dsida, Hungarian poet, translator (b. 1907)
- June 15 – Ernst Ludwig Kirchner, German painter (b. 1880)
- June 19 – María Obligado de Soto y Calvo, Argentinian painter (b. 1857)
- June 21 – Mathilde Comont, French-born American actress (b. 1886)
- June 25 – Edith Anne Stoney, Irish physicist (b. 1869)
- June 26 – James Weldon Johnson, American author, politician, and diplomat (b. 1871)
- June 27 – Kathryn Beaumont, British actress
- June 29 – Shlomo Ben-Yosef, Israeli Zionist leader (b. 1913)

=== July ===
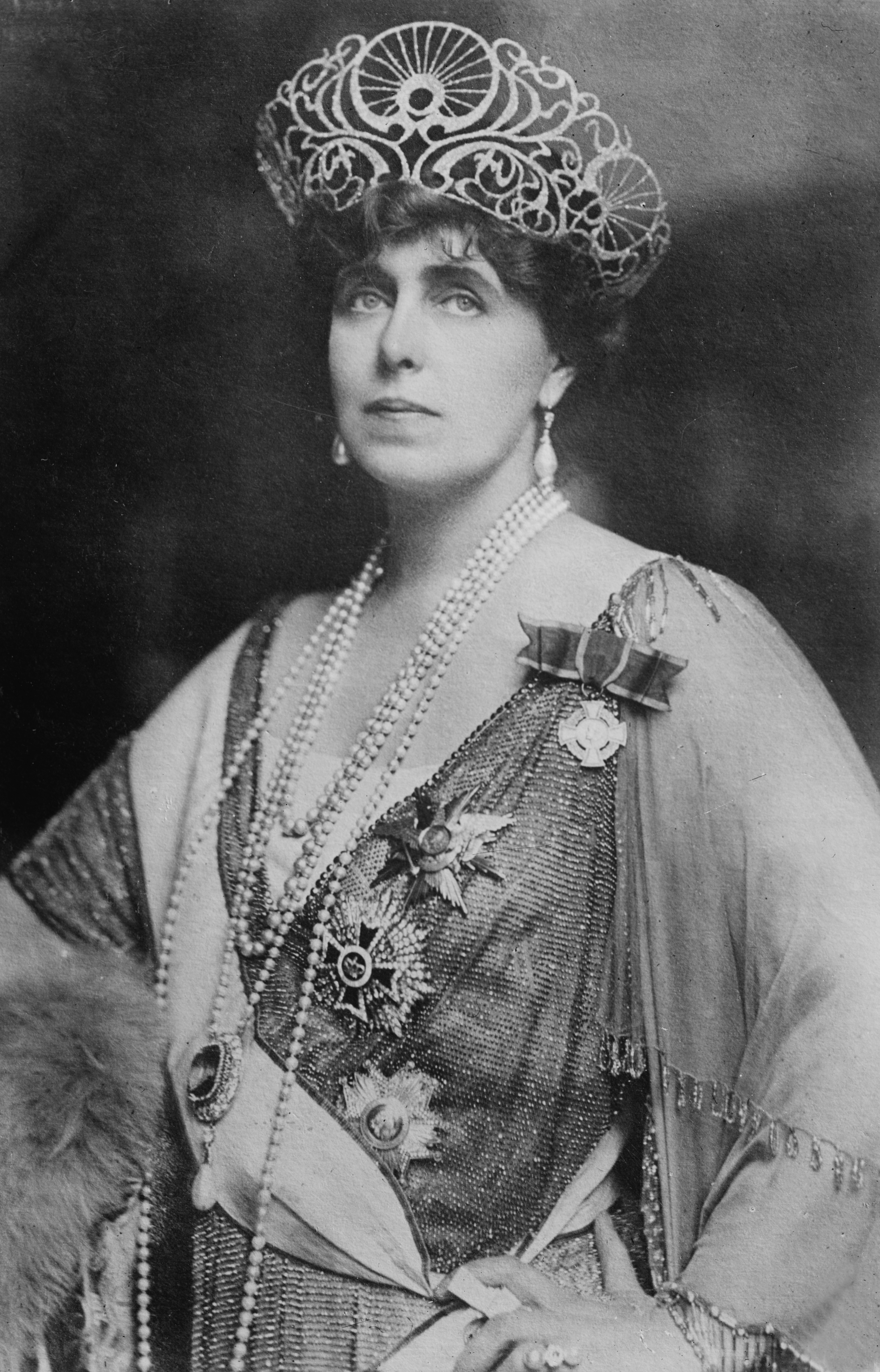
Queen Marie of Romania

- July 1 – Carrie Daumery, Dutch-born American actress (b. 1863)
- July 4
  - Otto Bauer, Austrian Social Democratic politician (b. 1881)
  - Suzanne Lenglen, French tennis champion (b. 1899)
- July 9 – Benjamin N. Cardozo, United States Supreme Court Justice (b. 1870)
- July 10 – Arthur Barclay, 15th president of Liberia (b. 1854)
- July 18 – Queen Marie of Romania (b. 1875)
- July 24 – Pedro Figari, Uruguayan painter, writer and politician (b. 1861)
- July 25
  - Franz I, Prince of Liechtenstein (b. 1853)
  - Kōsaku Hamada, Japanese academic, archaeologist and author (b. 1881)
- July 27 – Tom Crean, Irish seaman, Antarctic explorer (b. 1877)
- July 28
  - Yakov Davydov, Soviet general (executed) (b. 1888)
  - Jukums Vācietis, Soviet military commander (executed) (b. 1873)
  - Iosif Vareikis, Soviet politician (executed) (b. 1894)
- July 29
  - Yakov Alksnis, Soviet aviator, commander of Red Army Air Forces (executed) (b. 1897)
  - Nikolai Antipov, Soviet politician (executed) (b. 1894)
  - Yan Karlovich Berzin. Soviet politician and military intelligence officer (executed) (b. 1889)
  - Pavel Dybenko, Russian bolshevik and Soviet military commander (executed) (b. 1889)
  - Nikolai Krylenko, Russian bolshevik and Soviet politician (executed) (b. 1885)
  - Jānis Rudzutaks, Russian bolshevik and Soviet politician (executed) (b. 1887)

=== August ===
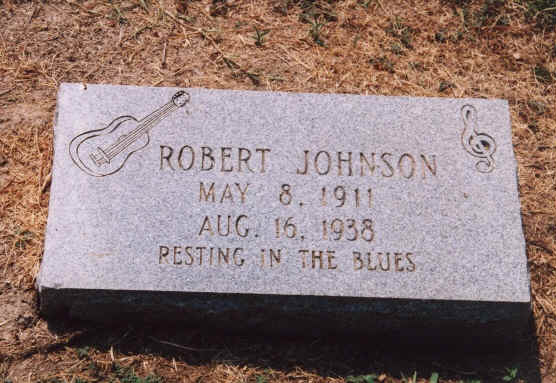
Robert Johnson

- August 2 – Edmund Dunggan, Irish-born Australian actor (b. 1862)
- August 4 – Pearl White, American actress (b. 1889)
- August 6 – Warner Oland, Swedish-born American actor (b. 1879)
- August 7 – Konstantin Stanislavsky, Soviet theatre practitioner (b. 1863)
- August 9 – Leo Frobenius, German ethnologist, archaeologist and Africanist (b. 1873)
- August 14 – Hugh Trumble, Australian cricketer (b. 1867)
- August 16 – Robert Johnson, American blues singer (b. 1911)
- August 17 – Wage Rudolf Supratman, Indonesian violinist and composer (b. 1903)
- August 21 – Tomasz Dąbal, Polish activist (b. 1890)
- August 26 – Teodor Axentowicz, Polish-born Soviet painter (b. 1859)
- August 29 – Béla Kun, Hungarian Communist leader (b. 1886)

=== September ===
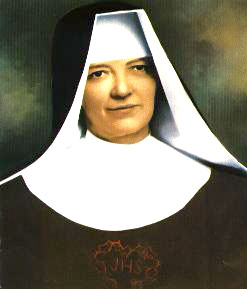
Blessed Maria Teresa of St. Joseph

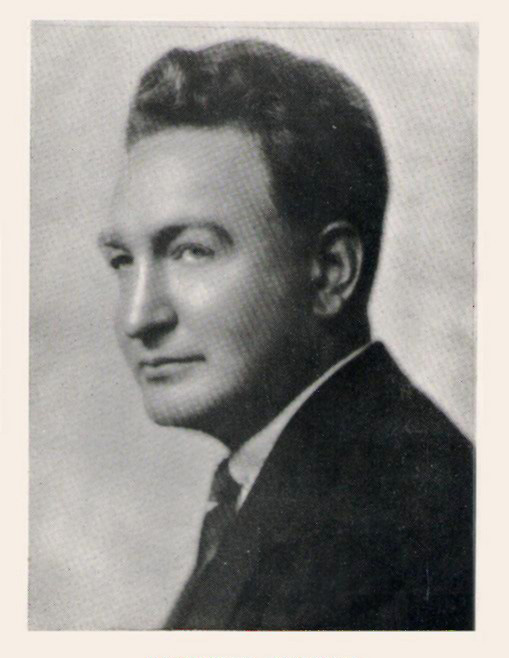
Aurelio Giorni

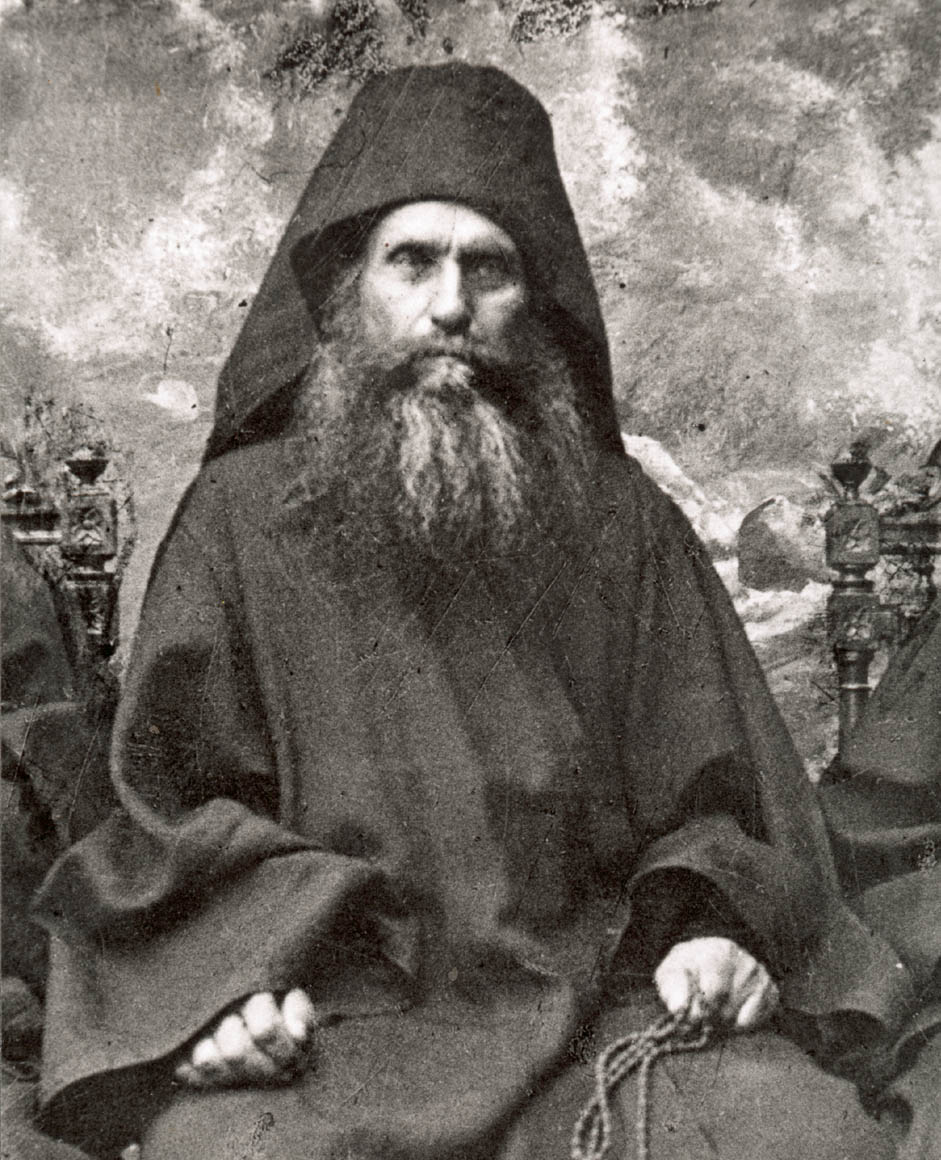
Silouan the Athonite

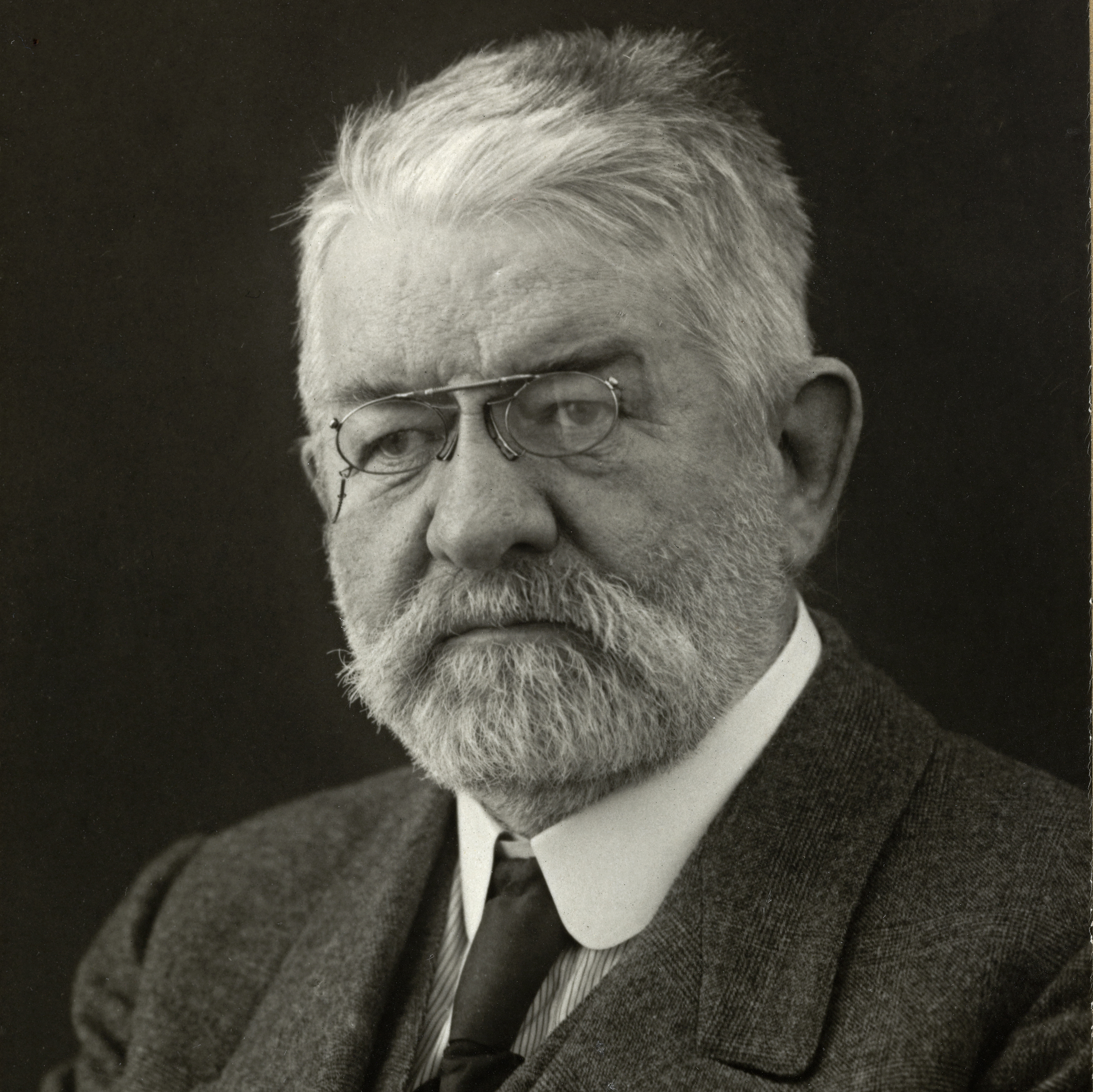
Paul Olaf Bodding

- September 1 – Nikolai Bryukhanov, Soviet statesman, political figure and People's Commissar of Finances (b. 1878)
- September 3 – Gustav Adolf Closs, German illustrator, painter (b. 1864)
- September 5 – Gheorghe Mărdărescu, Romanian general and politician (b. 1866)
- September 6 – Alfonso de Borbón y Battenberg, Prince of Asturias, former heir apparent to the throne of Spain (b. 1907)
- September 8 – Cecilio Apostol, Filipino poet, laurate (b. 1877)
- September 12 – Prince Arthur of Connaught (b. 1883)
- September 15
  - Yannoulis Chalepas, Greek sculptor (b. 1851)
  - Thomas Wolfe, American author (b. 1900)
- September 16
  - Herman Baltia, Belgian general (b. 1863)
  - Valerie Bergere, French-born American actress (b. 1867)
- September 17 – Bruno Jasieński, Polish poet (b. 1901)
- September 19 – Pauline Frederick, American actress (b. 1883)
- September 20 – Maria Teresa of St. Joseph, German Roman Catholic religious professed and blessed (b. 1855)
- September 21 – Ivana Brlić-Mažuranić, Yugoslav writer (b. 1874)
- September 23
  - Philbert Maurice d'Ocagne, French engineer, mathematician (b. 1862)
  - Aurelio Giorni, Italian composer, pianist (b. 1895)
- September 24 – Silouan the Athonite, Soviet Orthodox priest and saint (b. 1866)
- September 25 – Paul Olaf Bodding, Norwegian missionary to India, creator of the Santali Latin alphabet (b. 1865)
- September 30 – Tang Shaoyi, First Premier of the Republic of China (b. 1862)

=== October ===
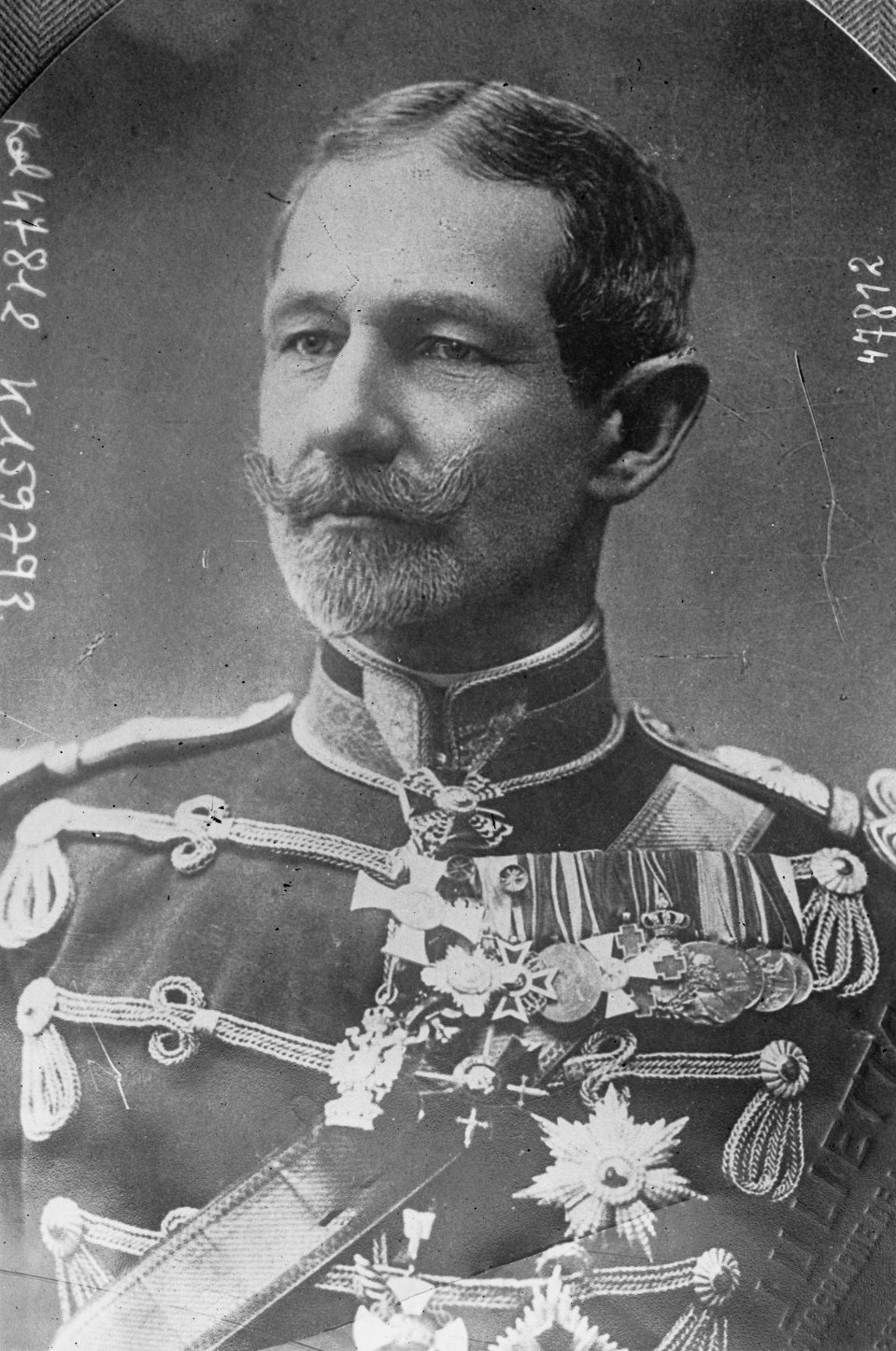
Alexandru Averescu

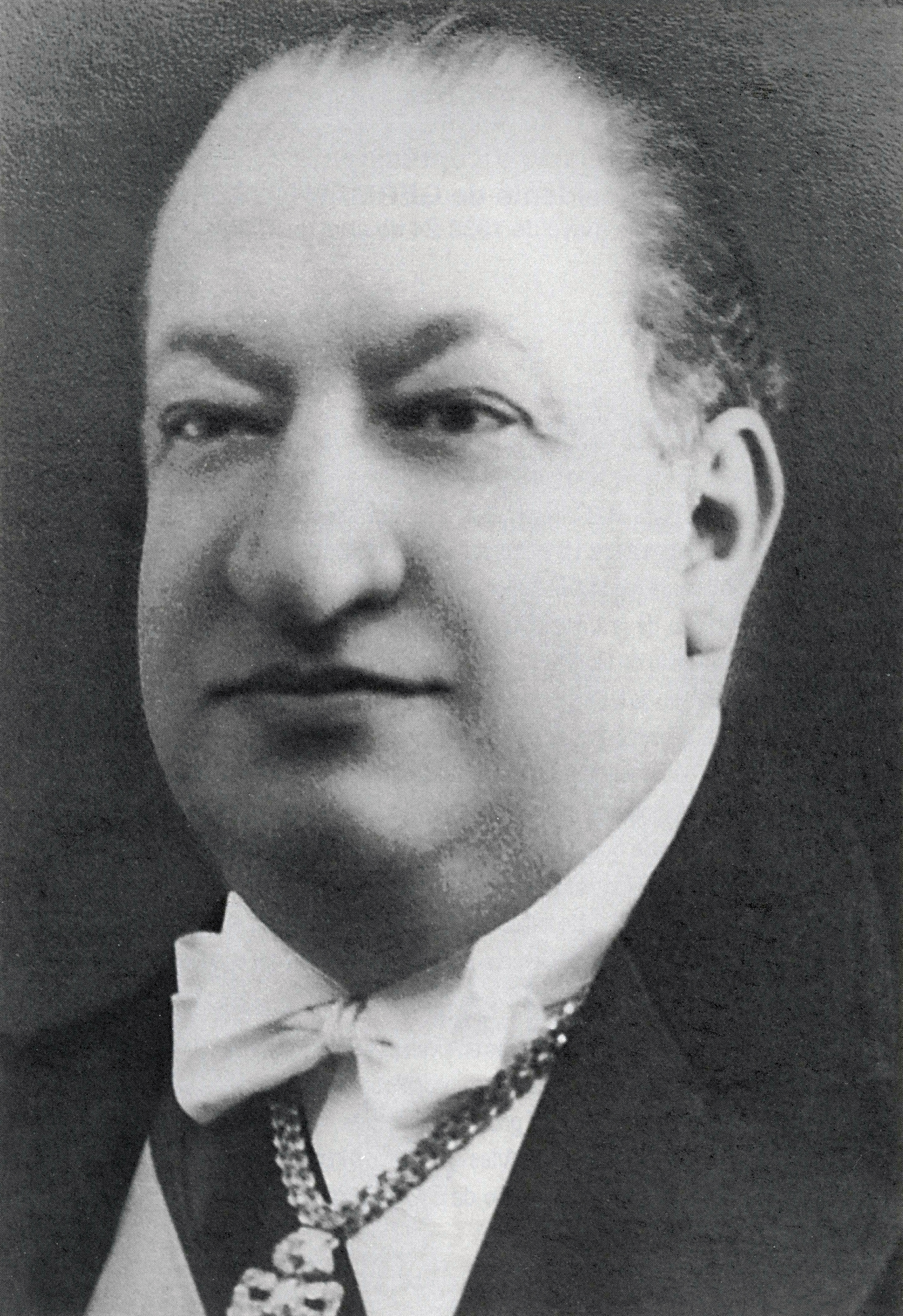
José Luis Tejada Sorzano

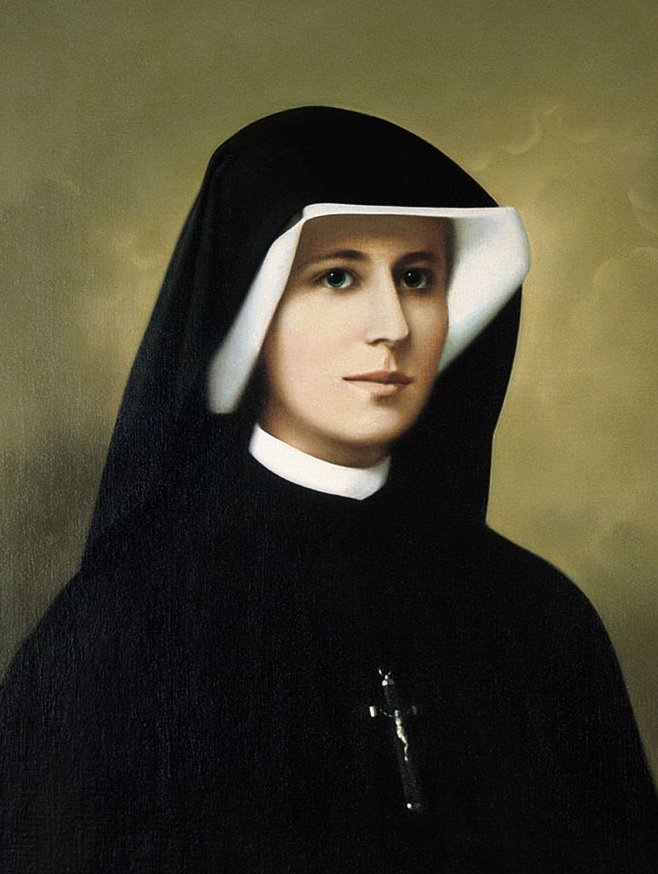
Saint Faustina Kowalska

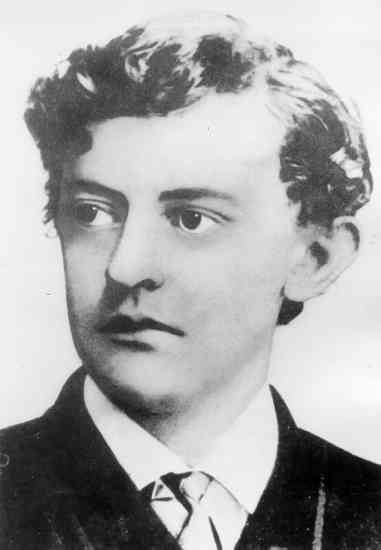
Ernst Barlach

- October 2 – Alexandru Averescu, Romanian general, politician, and 24th Prime Minister of Romania (b. 1859)
- October 4 – José Luis Tejada Sorzano, Bolivian lawyer, politician and 34th President of Bolivia (b. 1882)
- October 5
  - Faustina Kowalska, Polish nun and saint, the Secretary of Divine Mercy (b. 1905)
  - Albert Ranft, Swedish theatre director, actor (b. 1858)
- October 12 – Kirill Vladimirovich, Grand Duke of Russia (b. 1876)
- October 13 – E. C. Segar, American comics artist (Popeye) (b. 1894)
- October 14 – Charles Dalmas, French architect (b. 1863)
- October 17
  - Eshref Frasheri, Albanian politician (b. 1874)
  - Karl Kautsky, Austrian Marxist theoretician (b. 1854)
- October 19
  - Niño Fidencio, Mexican Roman Catholic priest and saint (b. 1898)
  - Prince Fushimi Hiroyoshi of Japan (b. 1897)
- October 22
  - Chrysostomos I of Athens, Greek priest, metropolitan (b. 1868)
  - May Irwin, Canadian actress, singer (b. 1862)
- October 24 – Ernst Barlach, German sculptor and poet (b. 1870)
- October 25
  - Raoul Bensaude, French physician (b. 1866)
  - Alfonsina Storni, Argentine poet (b. 1892)
- October 27
  - Lascelles Abercrombie, English poet and critic (b. 1881)
  - Alma Gluck, American soprano (b. 1884)
- October 28 – Ramón Franco, Spanish aviation pioneer (b. 1896)
- October 31
  - Sakari Ainali, Finnish farmer, businessman and politician (b. 1874)
  - Jean Degoutte, French general, leader of World War I (b. 1866)

=== November ===
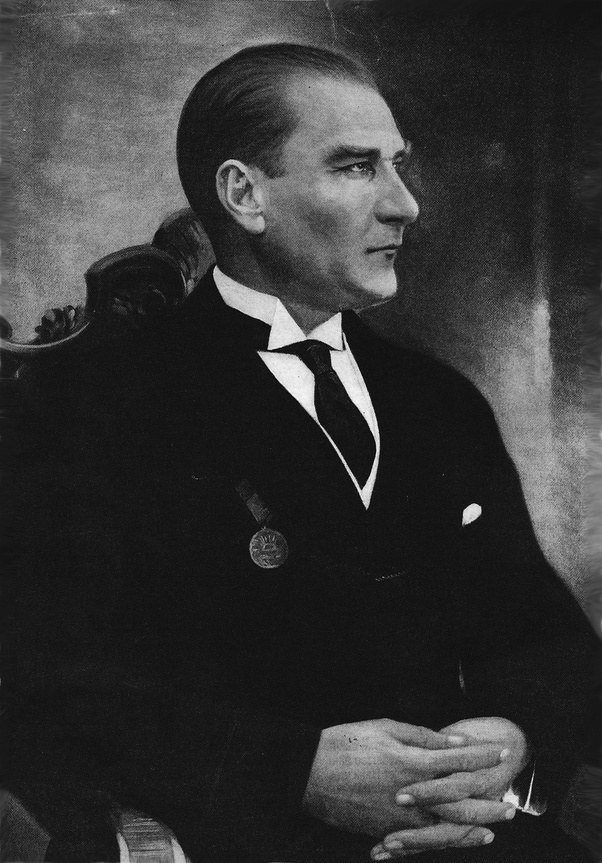
Mustafa Kemal Atatürk

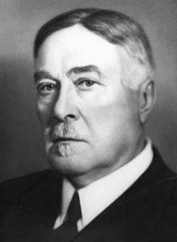
Kaarlo Castren

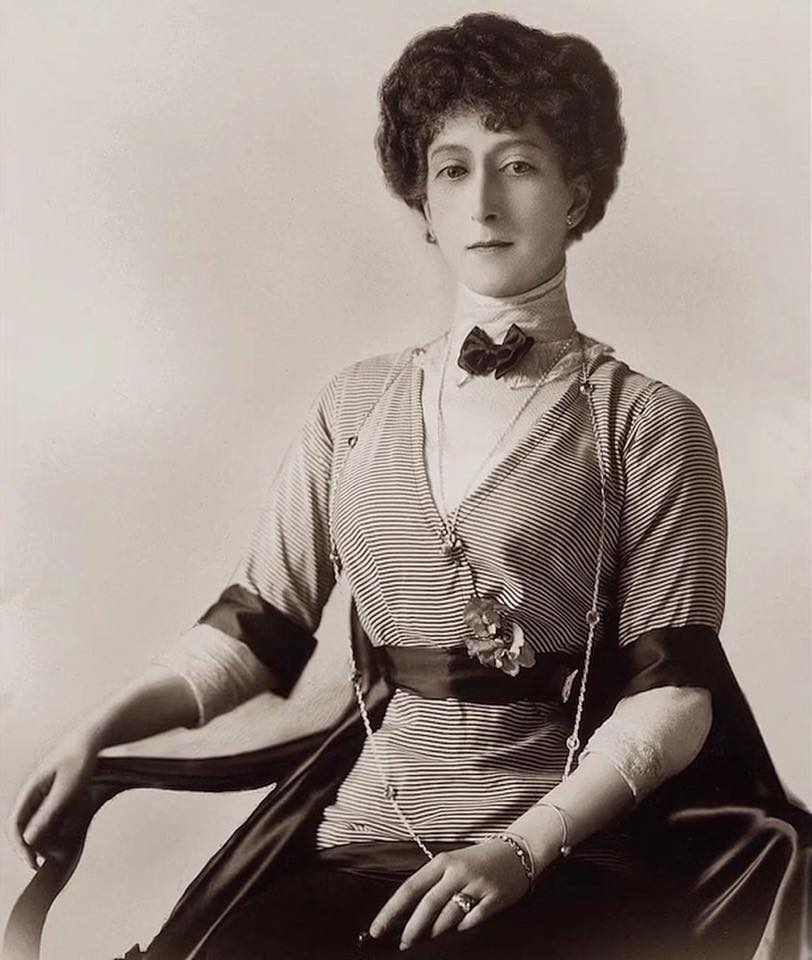
Maud, Queen of Norway

- November 4 – Jiang Baili, Chinese general of the National Revolutionary Army (b. 1882)
- November 7 – Prince Georgy Konstantinovich of Russia (b. 1903)
- November 9
  - Vasily Blyukher, Soviet military commander, Marshal of the Soviet Union (b. 1889)
  - Ernst vom Rath, German diplomat (b. 1909)
- November 10 – Mustafa Kemal Atatürk, 1st Prime Minister of Turkey, 1st President of Turkey (b. c.1881)
- November 11 – Mary Mallon (Typhoid Mary), first known (in the United States) asymptomatic carrier of the pathogen associated with typhoid fever (b. 1869)
- November 14 – William Lygon, 7th Earl Beauchamp, British politician and colonial governor (b. 1872)
- November 19 – Kaarlo Castren, Finnish politician, 4th Prime Minister of Finland (b. 1860)
- November 20
  - Arthur Elliott, South African photographer (b. 1870)
  - Maud of Wales, Queen of Haakon VII of Norway (b. 1869)
- November 22 – Sahachiro Hata, Japanese bacteriologist (b. 1873)
- November 25 – Otto von Lossow, Bavarian, German general (b. 1868)
- November 30 – Corneliu Zelea Codreanu, Romanian fascist politician, leader of the Iron Guard (executed along other Guard activists) (b. 1899)

=== December ===
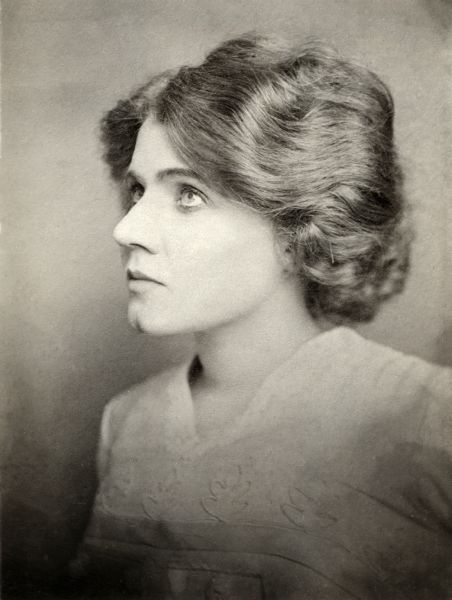
Florence Lawrence

- December 3 – Juho Vennola, 5th Prime Minister of Finland (b. 1872)
- December 11 – Christian Lous Lange, Norwegian pacifist, Nobel Peace Prize recipient (b. 1869)
- December 14 – Maurice Emmanuel, French composer (b. 1862)
- December 15
  - Antonio Rafael Barcelo, Puerto Rican lawyer, businessman and politician (b. 1868)
  - Valery Chkalov, Soviet test pilot (b. 1904)
- December 24 – Bruno Taut, German architect, urban planner (b. 1880)
- December 25
  - Karel Čapek, Czech author (b. 1890)
  - Theodor Fischer, German architect (b. 1862)
- December 27
  - Calvin Bridges, American scientist (b. 1889)
  - Osip Mandelstam, Soviet poet (b. 1891)
  - Emile Vandervelde, Belgian Socialist politician (b. 1866)
- December 28 – Florence Lawrence, Canadian actress (b. 1886)

== Nobel Prizes ==

- Physics – Enrico Fermi
- Chemistry – Richard Kuhn
- Physiology or Medicine – Corneille Jean François Heymans
- Literature – Pearl S. Buck
- Peace – Nansen International Office for Refugees, Geneva
