= Belgrano C =

Coordinates: 34°33′32″S 58°27′04″W

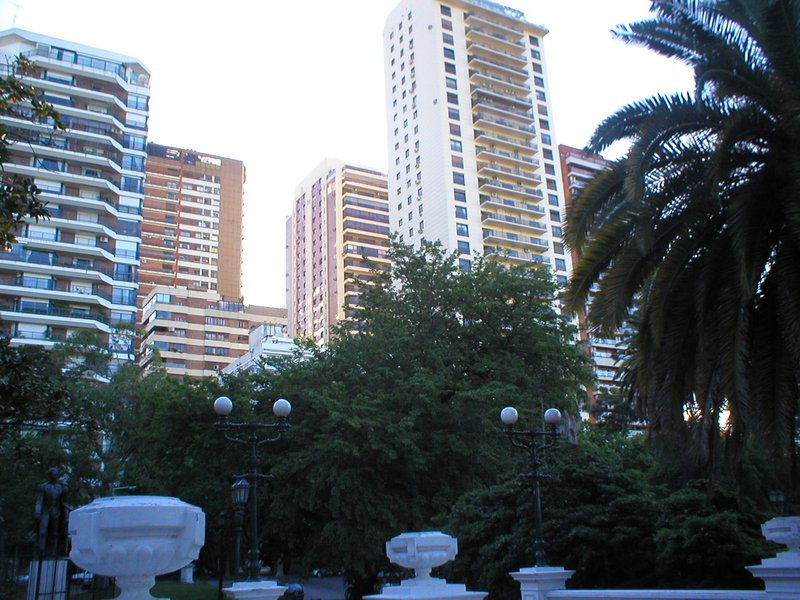
Architecture in Belgrano C

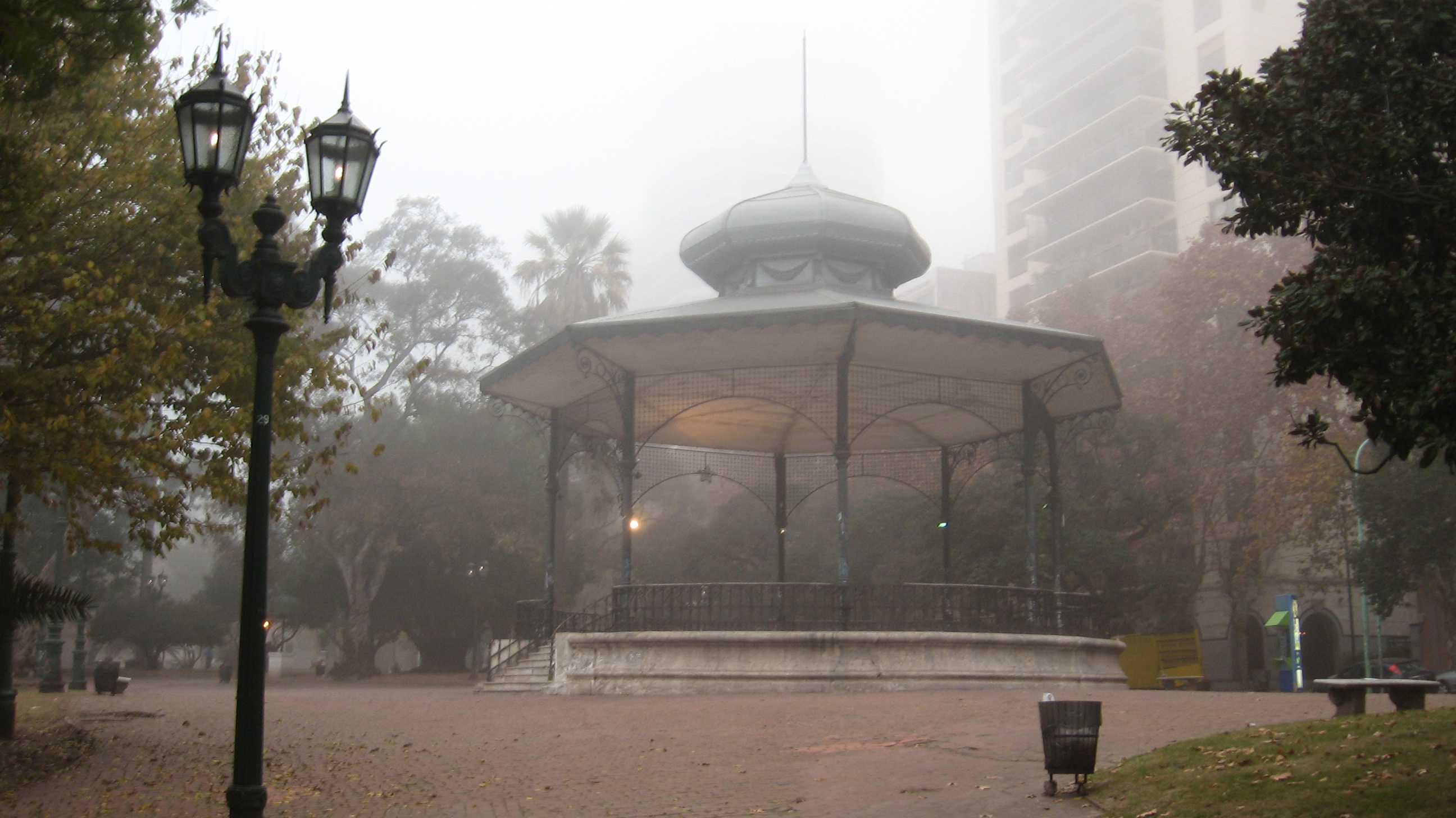
Bandstand in the Barrancas de Belgrano Park

Belgrano C is a sector within the barrio of Belgrano of Buenos Aires, Argentina, and is not officially recognised as one of the 48 barrios of Buenos Aires.

The district is also known as Barrancas de Belgrano, and is centered on Juramento Avenue and the Barrancas de Belgrano Park. The Museo Histórico Sarmiento and the Parish of the Immacualte Conception are among the best-known neighborhood landmarks. Along with Bajo Belgrano, Belgrano R, Chinatown and the River Barrio, Belgrano C is one of the 5 sub-sections or unofficial barrios of Belgrano.

== Etymology ==
The C stands for the train station that belonged to the Central Argentine Railway, called Belgrano C, to differentiate it from the Belgrano R Railway Station. The C is mistakenly believed to be originated in the word commercial or center.
