= Agujari =

Agujari or Aguiari is a surname. Notable people with the surname include:

- Eleonora Aguiari (born 1969), Italian installation artist and author
- Lucrezia Aguiari, Italian coloratura soprano
- Giuseppe Agujari (1843–1885), Italian-Argentine painter
- Tito Agujari (1834–1908), Italian portraitist and history painter
