= María Obligado de Soto y Calvo =

Argentine painter

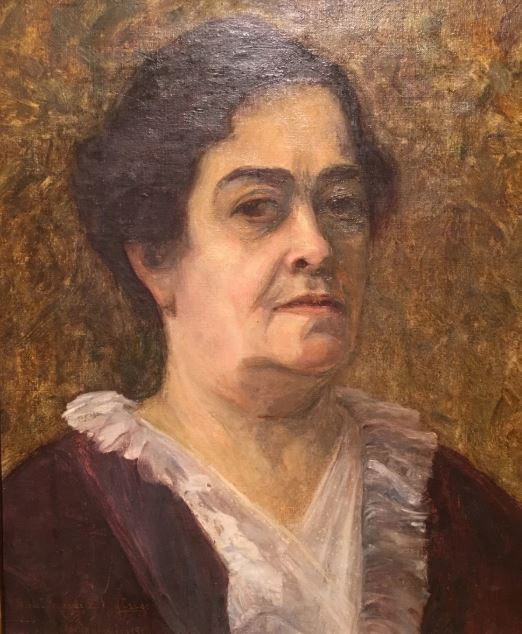
Self-portrait (date unknown)

María Obligado de Soto y Calvo (4 February 1857 – 19 June 1938) was an Argentine painter who worked in a variety of genres.

== Biography ==
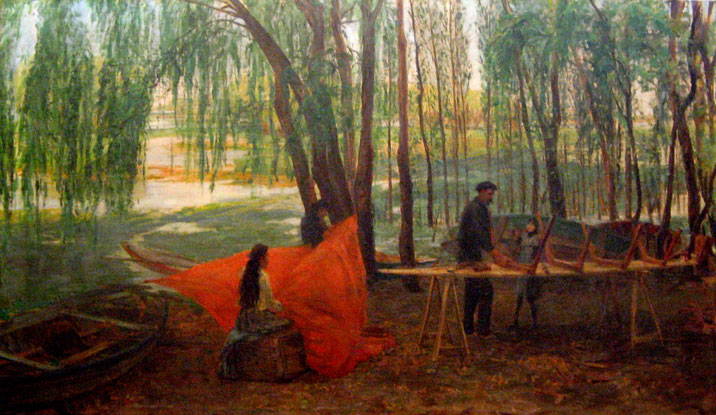
Obligado Tarea en el río (At Work on the River)

She was born in Buenos Aires, and grew up in a stimulating family environment, along with her brother, the poet Rafael Obligado. While still quite young, she began studying with Giuseppe Agujari, an Italian-born professor who tutored many young women from high society with artistic inclinations, but it soon became clear that her interests were more than a hobby.

As with many other Argentine artists of that period, she went to Paris to complete her studies and gain some knowledge of art history. While there, she studied at the Académie Julian with Jean-Paul Laurens and Jean-Joseph Benjamin-Constant; maintaining a close professional relationship with them throughout her career.

After marrying the writer Francisco Soto y Calvo (1860-1936), in 1888, the couple would alternate between living in Europe and Argentina until 1910. He proved to be very supportive of her aspirations and was able to provide essential connections with potential purchasers.

In 1896, she held a joint exhibition with Julia Wernicke at the Ateneo de Buenos Aires. In 1910, she and several other women artists, notably Eugenia Belin Sarmiento, participated in the Exposición Internacional del Centenario. Her most important group showings, however, were at the Paris Salon in 1900, 1901, 1902 and 1909. She also had three significant individual showings at the Galería Witcomb in 1902, 1918 and 1927, when she was seventy. Despite these successes, her name has played a very small role in Argentine art history. She died in Ramallo.

Her works may be seen at the Dr. Julio Marc Provincial Historical Museum in Rosario, to which she donated most of her works, the National Historical Museum and the Tigre Art Museum. Her works have also been included at recent exhibitions of modern art at the Museo Nacional de Bellas Artes.

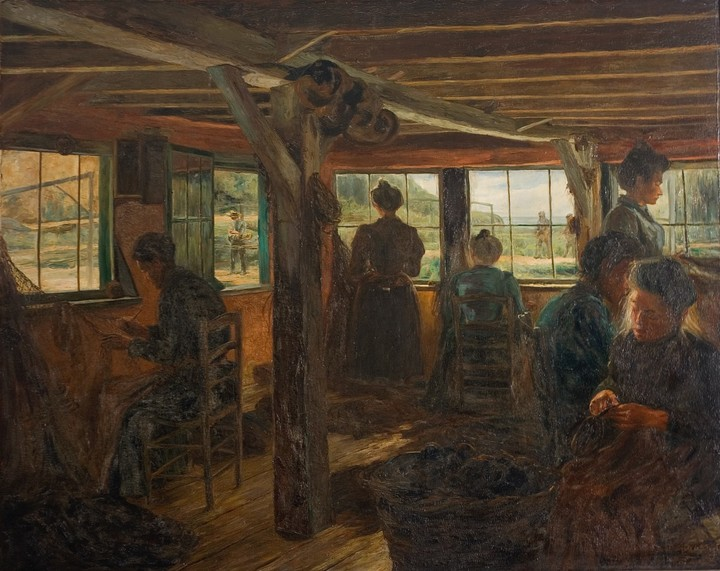
En Normandie (In Normandy, 1902)
