= Inmaculada Concepción parish =

Church building in Buenos Aires, Argentina

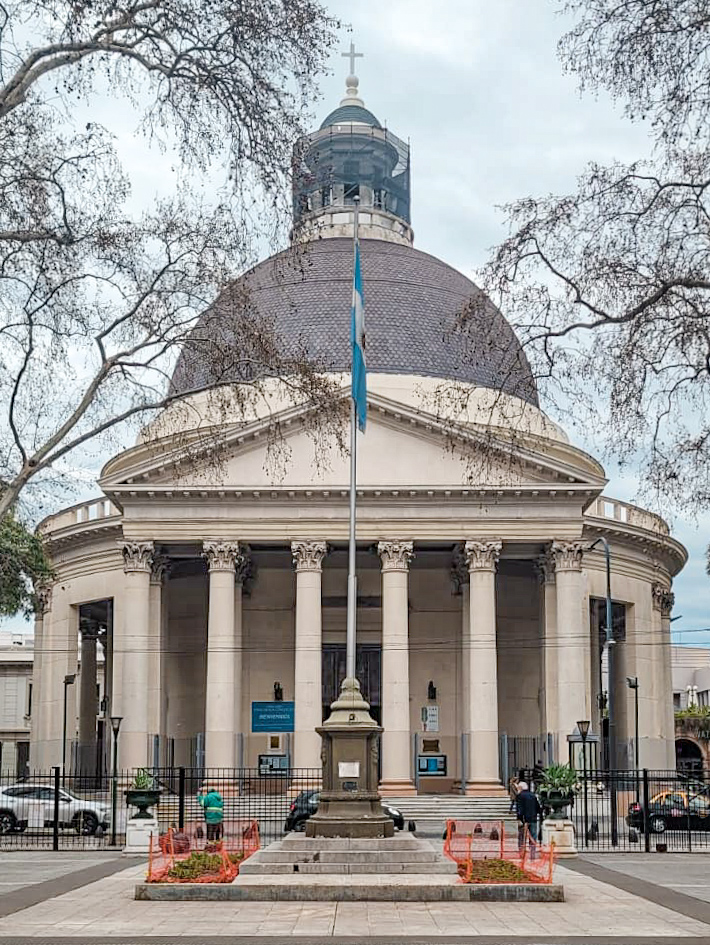
- Main facade of the parish

Religion
- Affiliation: Roman Catholic
- Diocese: Archdiocese of Buenos Aires
- Ecclesiastical or organizational status: Parish

Location
- Municipality: Buenos Aires
- Interactive map of Inmaculada Concepción parish
- Coordinates: 34°20′04″S 58°16′19″W

Architecture
- Style: Neo-Renaissance
- Completed: 1878; 148 years ago

The Inmaculada Concepción parish is a church in the neighborhood of Belgrano, Buenos Aires. Popularly known as "the round church" or "La Redonda," the parish is in front of the Manuel Belgrano Square, across from Larreta museum, and near the Sarmiento museum.

== History ==
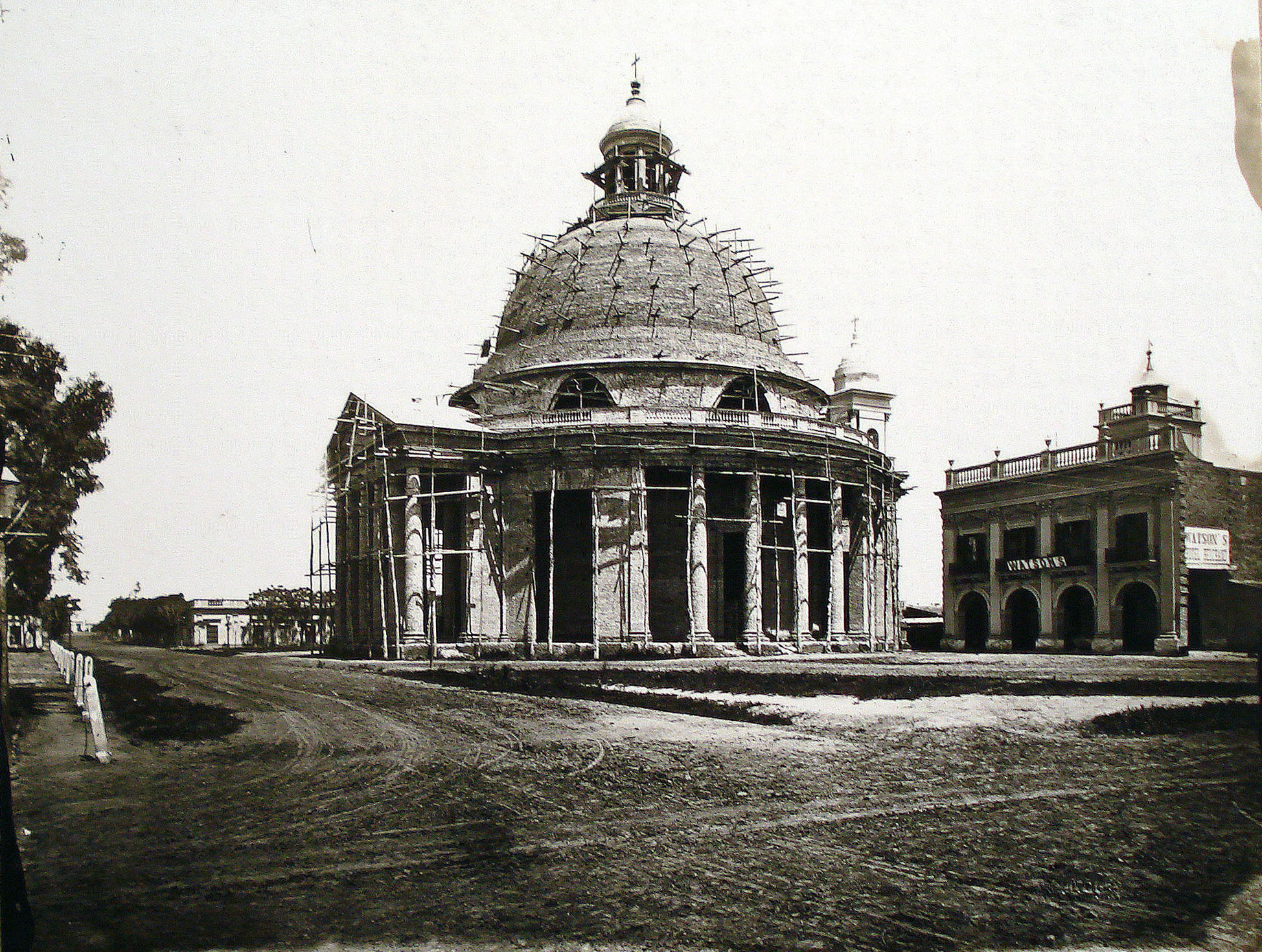
The parish in 1875.

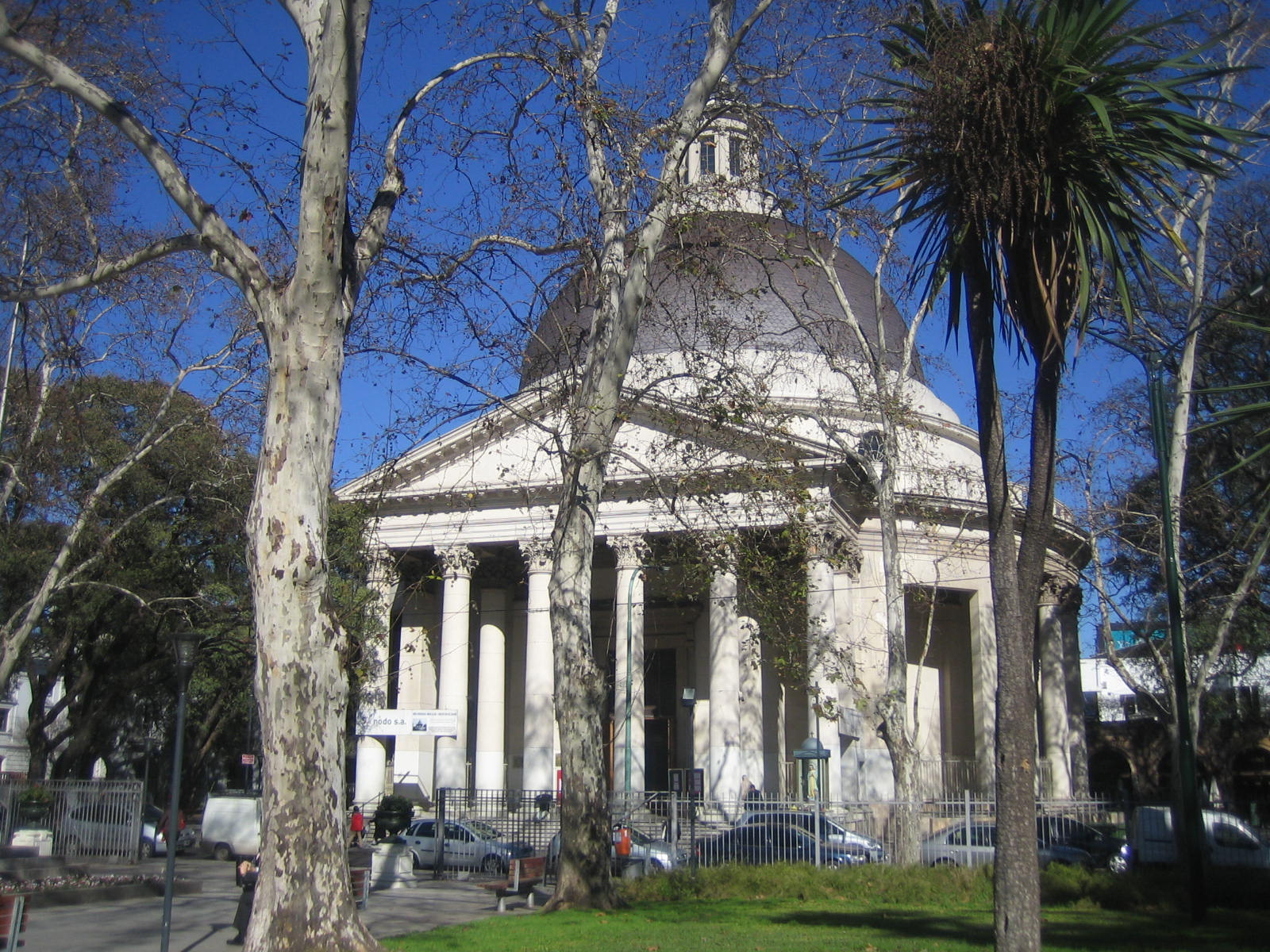
View from Manuel Belgrano Square.

The first parish in the Belgrano neighborhood was located at the corner of La Pampa and 11 de Septiembre. According to legend, it was originally built by the owner of the land, so that his slaves, who were engaged in farm work, would have a place to hear mass. In its early years, the parish was dedicated to San Benito.

Many years later the property transferred to José Julián Arriola, who donated the parish to the church and the adjacent lands to the Curia. A brick kiln and a lime kiln built by Arriola were later used by the Franciscan Fathers.

The decree of 6 December 1855, which approved the delineation of the village, stated in one article that: "it would also be their duty to provide immediate restoration of the old building that exists there, so that it could temporarily serve a school that should form and for a chapel, while the square were built in the respective buildings for those destinations."

On December 8, 1856, the restoration of the chapel was completed and celebrated with a large party. The opening celebration was widely attended, with guests including the Governor of Buenos Aires (Valentín Alsina), ministers, the Archbishop of Buenos Aires, and Monsignor Aneiros. Fray Olegario conducted a sung solemn mass after first chaplain officiated.

Two years later, the parish was designated to the attention of the priest José Salomón, and on April 20, 1860, it was declared an official Parish. Don Miguel Padin served as the first priest at the new church. The chapel was "modest conditions for a population of unusual development, poor in its physical condition, and uncomfortable for attendees to get to because the dirt roads were often muddy." The Municipality of Belgrano, which at that time was headed by Don Laureano J. Oliver, decided in early 1864 to organize a committee to take charge of the work for the construction of a new temple to replace the old Parish.

After completing all studies relating to the new Parish's construction (this should have started in mid-1864, or earlier) and setting aside a budget of $1,630,000, Sunday, 23 January 1865 was set as the date for placing the foundation stone. The event took place at six o'clock, at which time a record was signed and placed in a chest, along with the pens used, and several silver medals given by the Godfather of the ceremony, Dr. Valentin Alsina.

The construction of the monumental temple was entrusted to engineer Nicolas Canale. After his death in 1876, the work was continued by his son Joseph, with architect Juan Antonio Buschiazzo also contributing to the later stages of the project. For lack of money, the building process was slow. To get more funds, he had to auction off the grounds containing the old chapel and the new construction. A text of the time stated "Today, the interesting ball past the Paseo de la Barranca building and land belonging to the old church takes place. Would recommend this field to rich capitalists who love the good and progress, much remains its product intended for the continuation of our colossal monument, the new church. "

From 1871 to 1875 the Priest Don Diego Miller was in charge of the Parish. Don Diego Miller was one of the most well-esteemed priests, for his tireless work leading the religious and spiritual life of the Belgrano during those years. Miller devoted all his efforts to the construction of the new temple, a job that by its magnitude also required the continued work of many people. His name headed the list that, until a few years ago, was taped to the side of the altar, on the wall, which reminded those who formed the Commission at the time of opening of the temple. That list was as follows: "Commission of the works of this temple Mr. Priest Canon Diego D. Miller, D. Benjamin Carranza Cura Vicario, Juan Buschiazzo, architect, Mr. Don Alejandro Caride, Mr. John B. Corti., Jorge Civit, 1878. "

The church was finally opened on December 8, 1878. To celebrate, a ceremony was held featuring the President of the Republic, Dr. Nicolás Avellaneda and his ministers; the governor of the province of Buenos Aires, Carlos Tejedor and the highest dignities of the Church, the Magistrate of Belgrano, José María Sagasta Island and Parish Priest, and Benjamin D. Carranza.

== Gallery ==
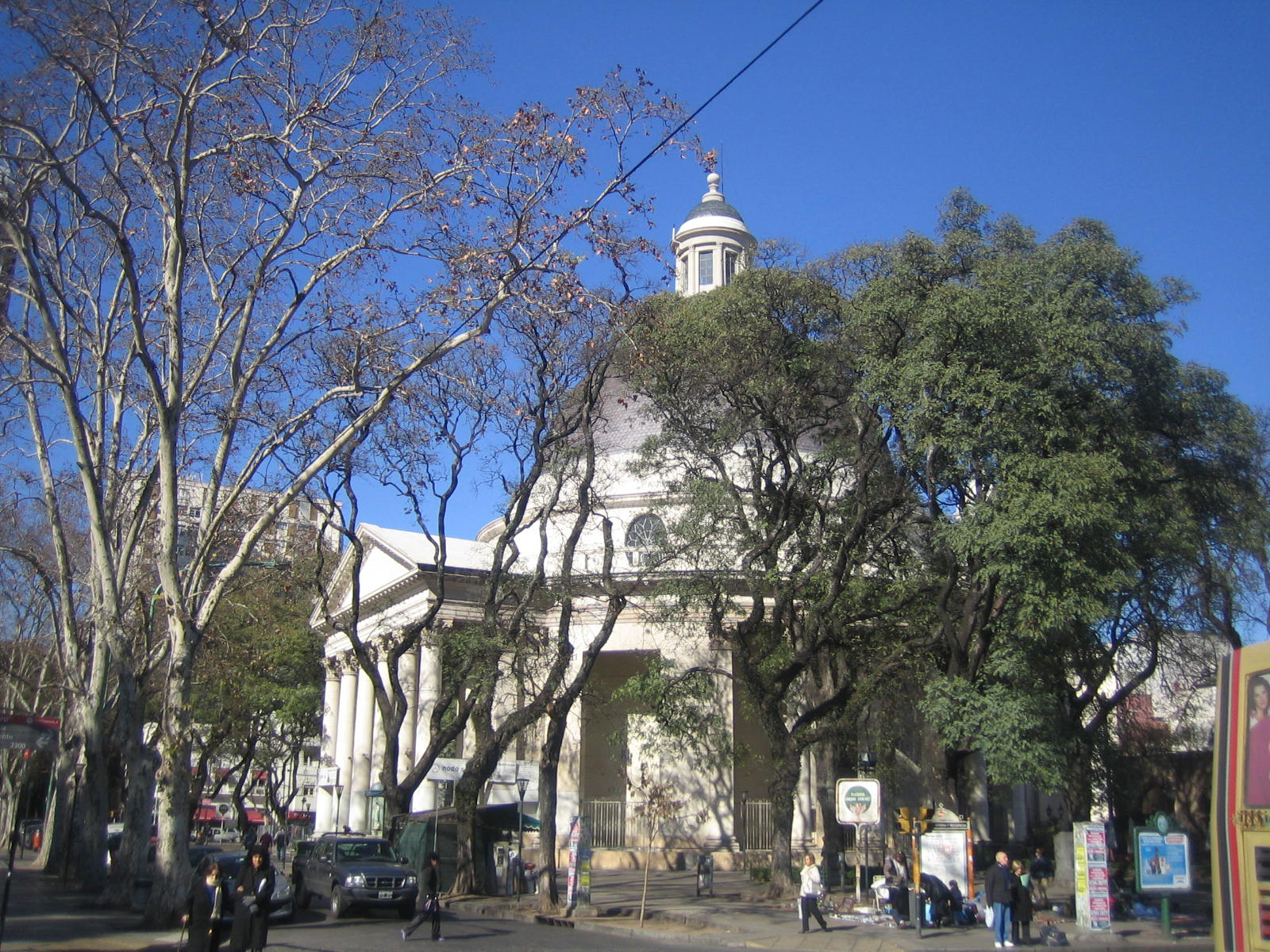

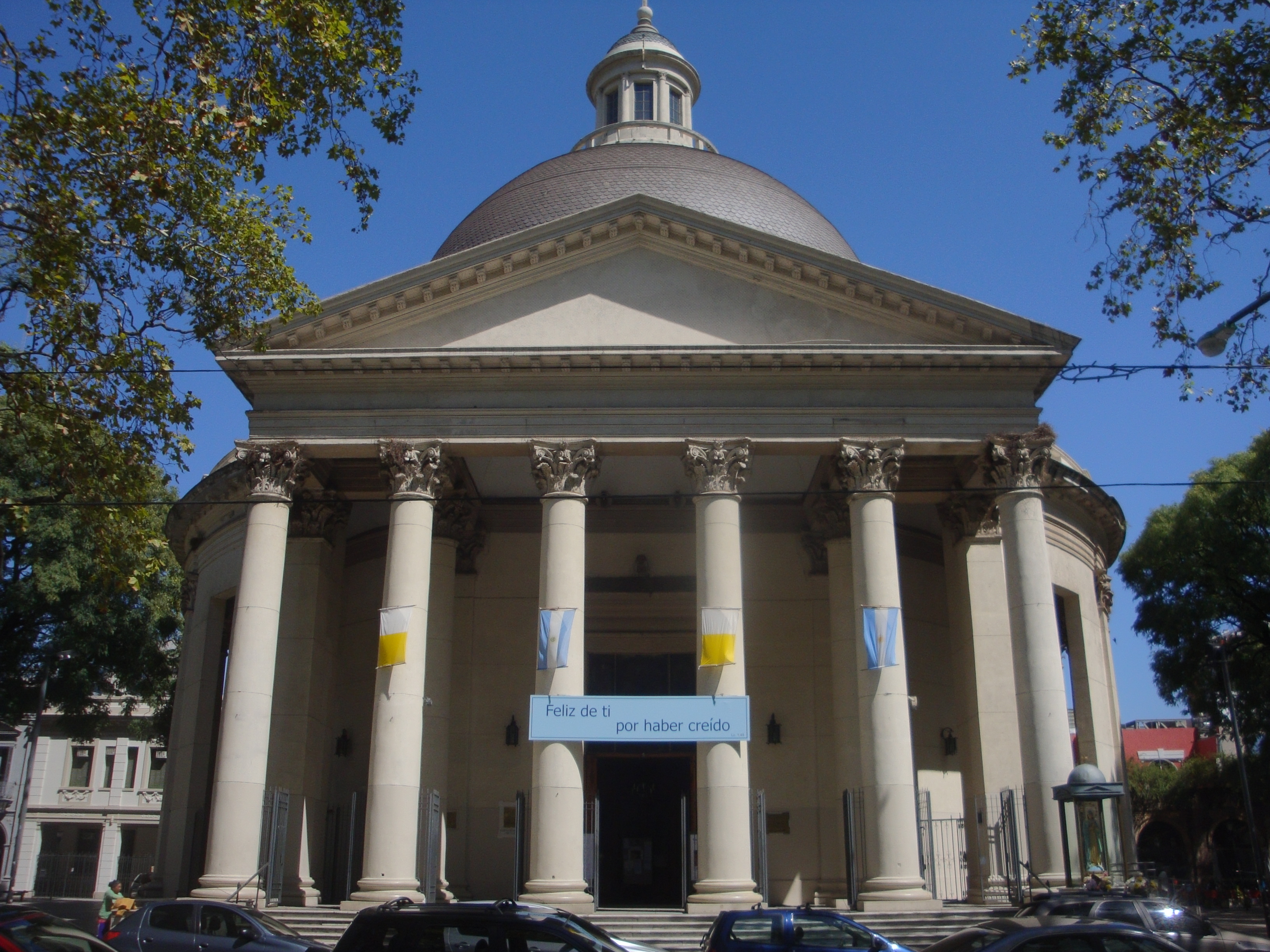

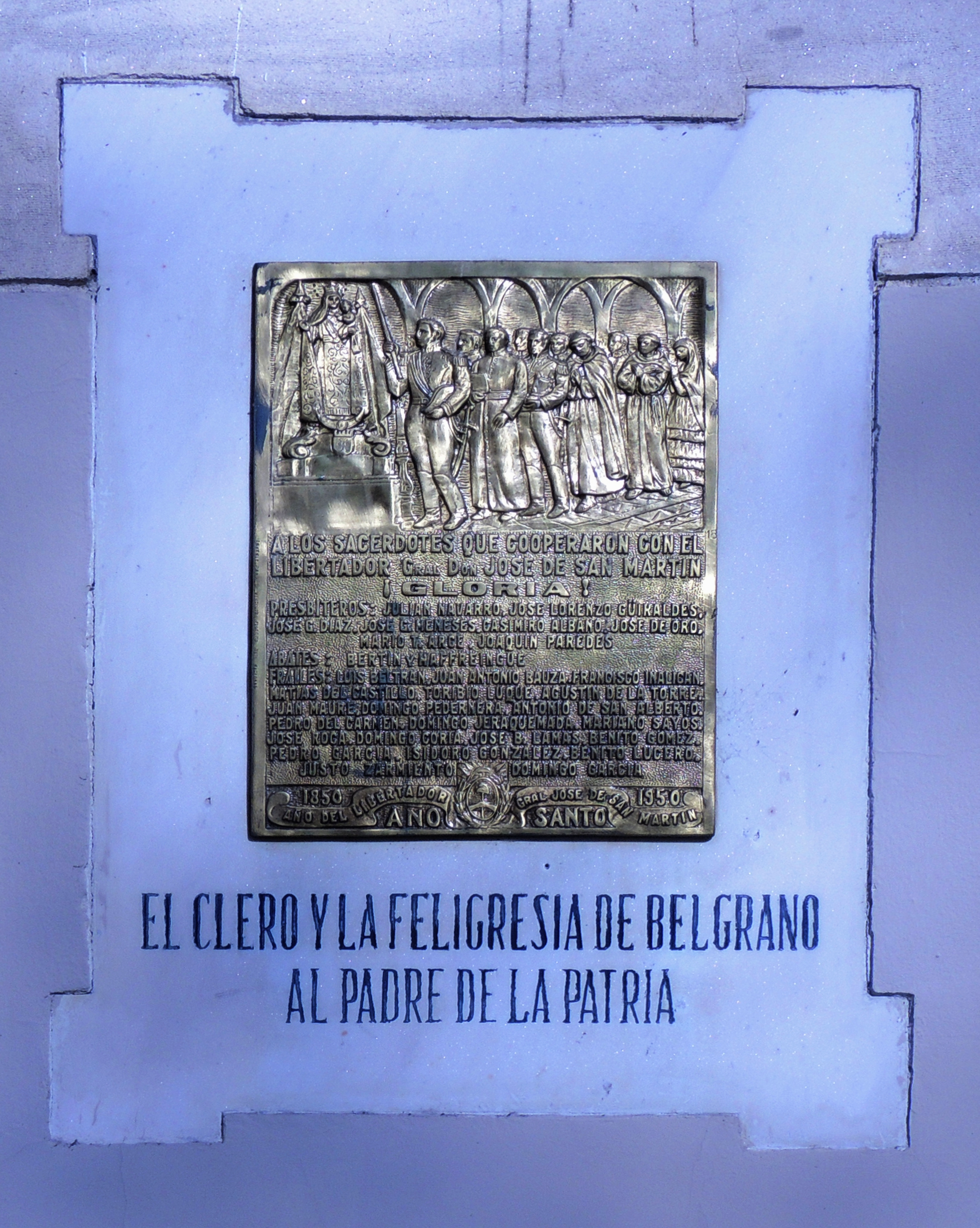

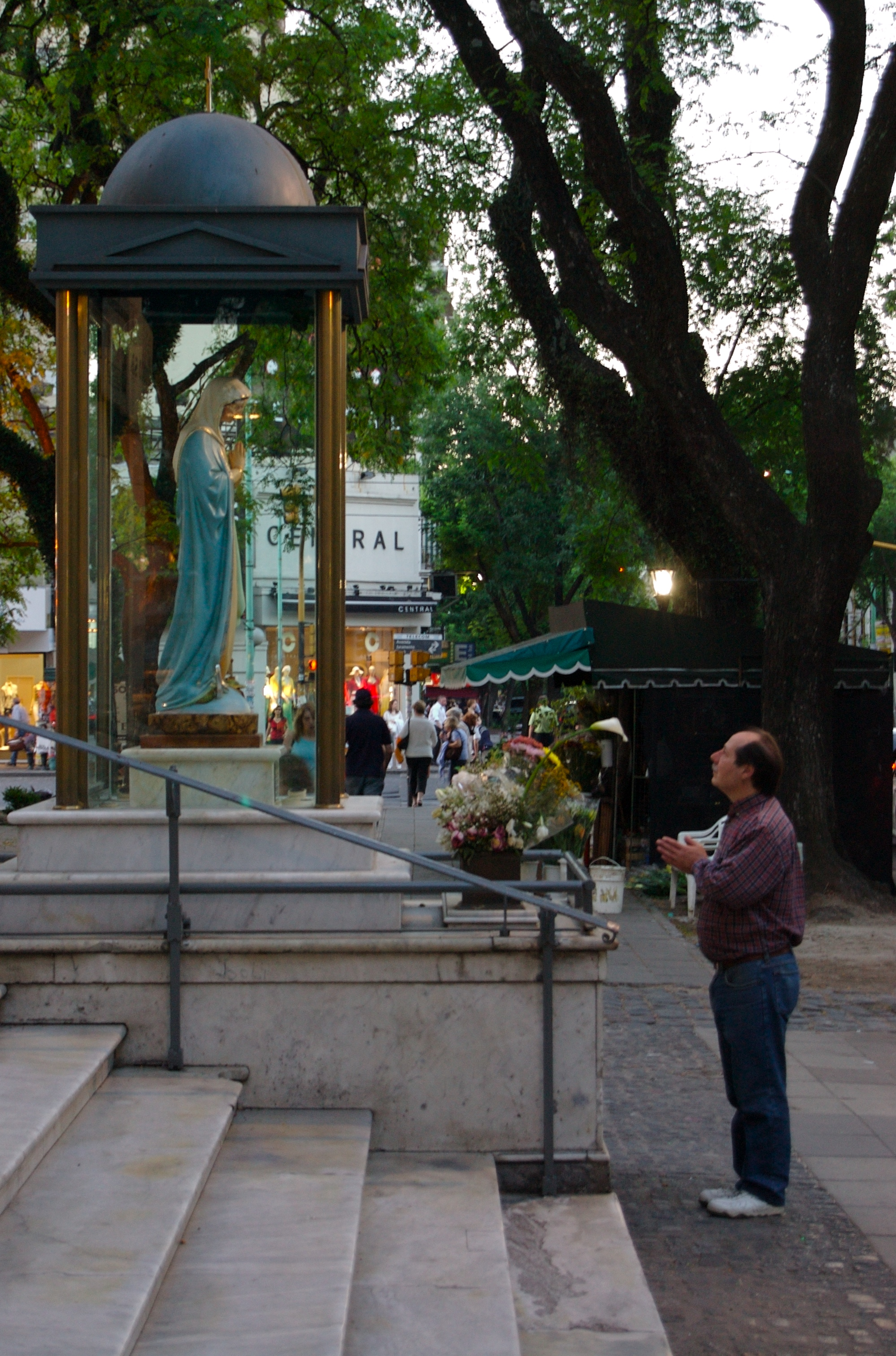
