= Juan Antonio Buschiazzo =

Italian-born Argentine architect and engineer (1845–1917)

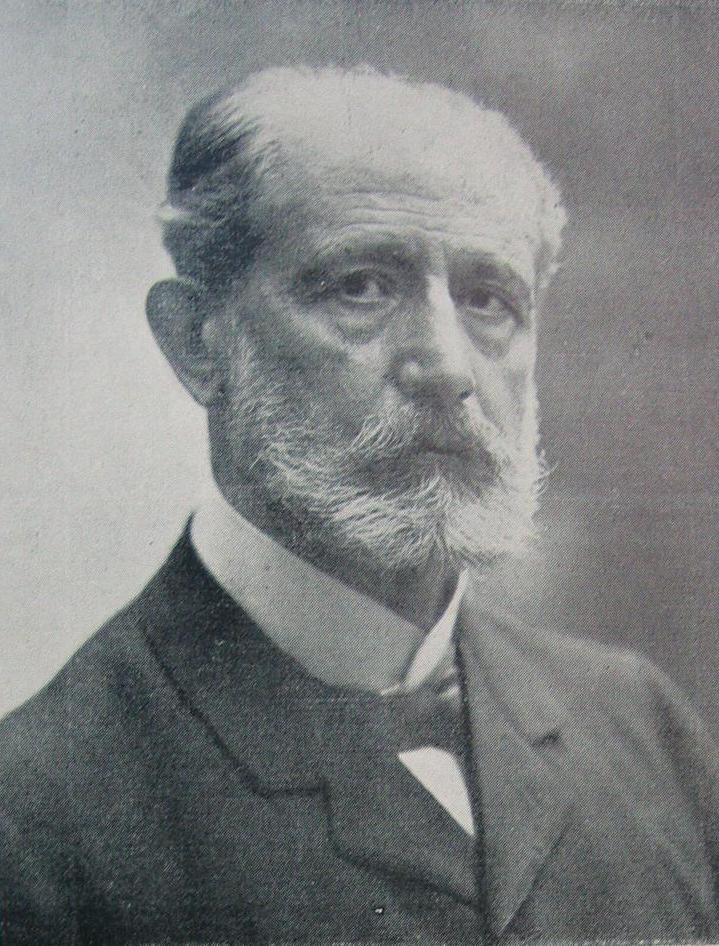
Buschiazzo in 1966

Juan Antonio Buschiazzo (October 29, 1845 – May 13, 1917) was an Italian-born Argentine architect and engineer who contributed to the modernisation of Buenos Aires, Argentina in the 1880s and to the construction of the city of La Plata, the new capital of the Buenos Aires Province.

== Biography ==
Born on October 29, 1845, in Pontinvrea, Buschiazzo was the son of Margarita Bresciani and Carlos Buschiazzo. In 1850, the family arrived to Argentina and took up residence in Belgrano, a town that was soon to become a neighbourhood of the city of Buenos Aires. It was here that his four brothers and sisters were born.

In 1862, he started work in the studio of the Italian architect Nicolás Canale and his son José, and in 1869 he graduated from the University of Buenos Aires with a degree in architecture and construction engineering. In 1875, he became a member of the Municipal Commission for Public Works in Belgrano and in 1878 he qualified as an architect. In 1879, his son, Juan Carlos, was born and was later to become an architect and work with his father on a number of projects.

When Buenos Aires officially became the capital of Argentina in 1880 he was invited by the first mayor of the city, Torcuato de Alvear, to join the Department of Municipal Engineers. Thereafter he was involved with a wide range of projects concerned with the modernisation of Buenos Aires and the construction of public buildings, houses, hospitals, cemeteries, churches, parks, banks etc. In 1881, he joined the Commission for overseeing building projects in the city of La Plata.

In 1886, he founded the Central Society of Architects and became its president between 1888 and 1891 and again between 1901 and 1902.

Between 1908 and 1910, he participated in the Commission for the International Centennial Exposition. He died in Buenos Aires on 13 May 1917.
