= Belgrano, Buenos Aires =

Coordinates: 34°33′45″S 58°27′30″W

Belgrano
- Neighborhood of Buenos Aires
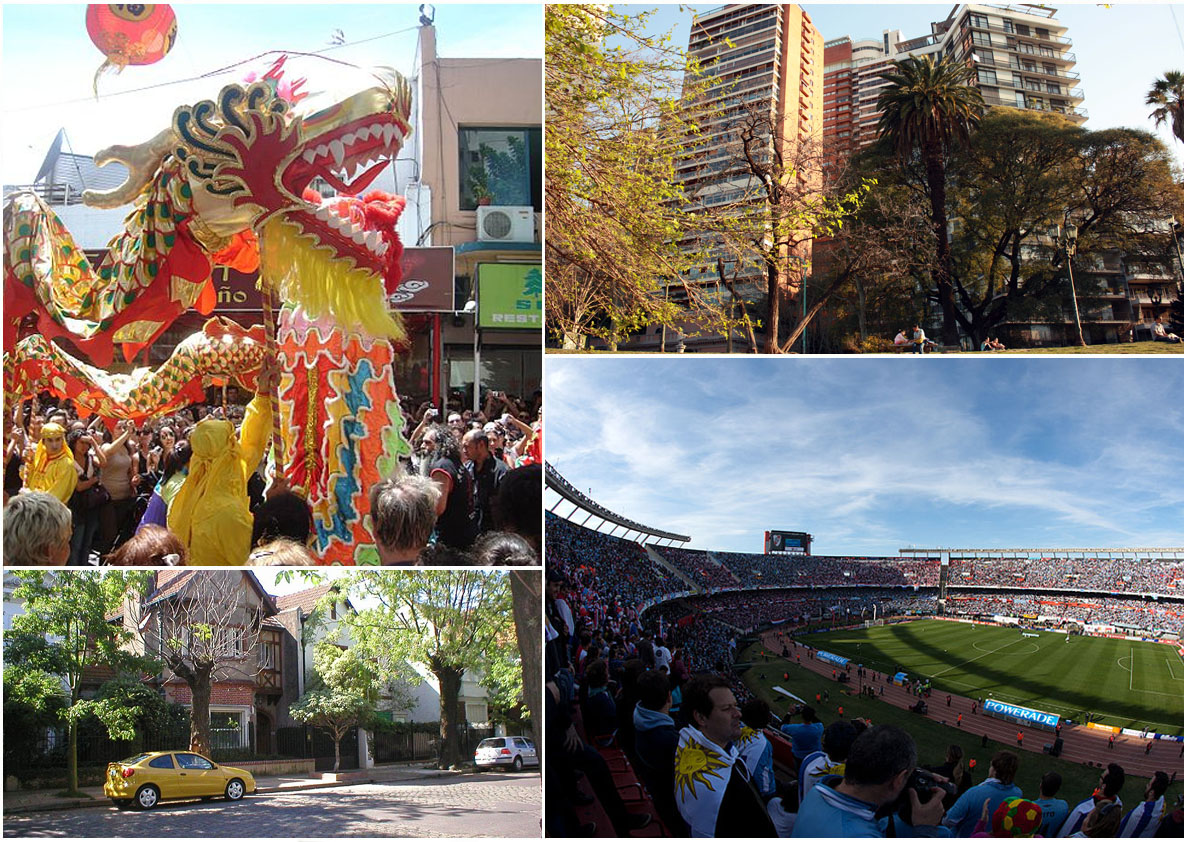
- Clockwise from top: Chinese New Year celebrations in Chinatown, Barrancas de Belgrano, a typical residential street in Belgrano R and River Plate Stadium.

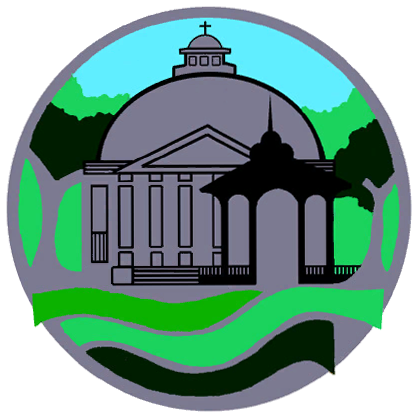
- Emblem
- Interactive map of Belgrano
- Country: Argentina
- Autonomous City: Buenos Aires
- Comuna: C13

Government
  - President: Florencia Scavino (PRO-JxC)

Area
  - Total: 6.8 km^{2} (2.6 sq mi)

Population (2022)
  - Total: 142,129
  - Density: 21,000/km^{2} (54,000/sq mi)
- Time zone: UTC-3 (ART)

Belgrano is a northern barrio or neighborhood of Buenos Aires, Argentina. It is primarily composed of middle and upper class residents. Belgrano has three distinct areas: the main one that is made up of apartment buildings, Belgrano "R" which is a leafy suburb area with English architecture, and Buenos Aires' Chinatown.

== Location ==
The barrio of Palermo is to the southeast; Núñez is to the northwest; Coghlan, Villa Urquiza, Villa Ortúzar and Colegiales are to the southwest.

== History ==
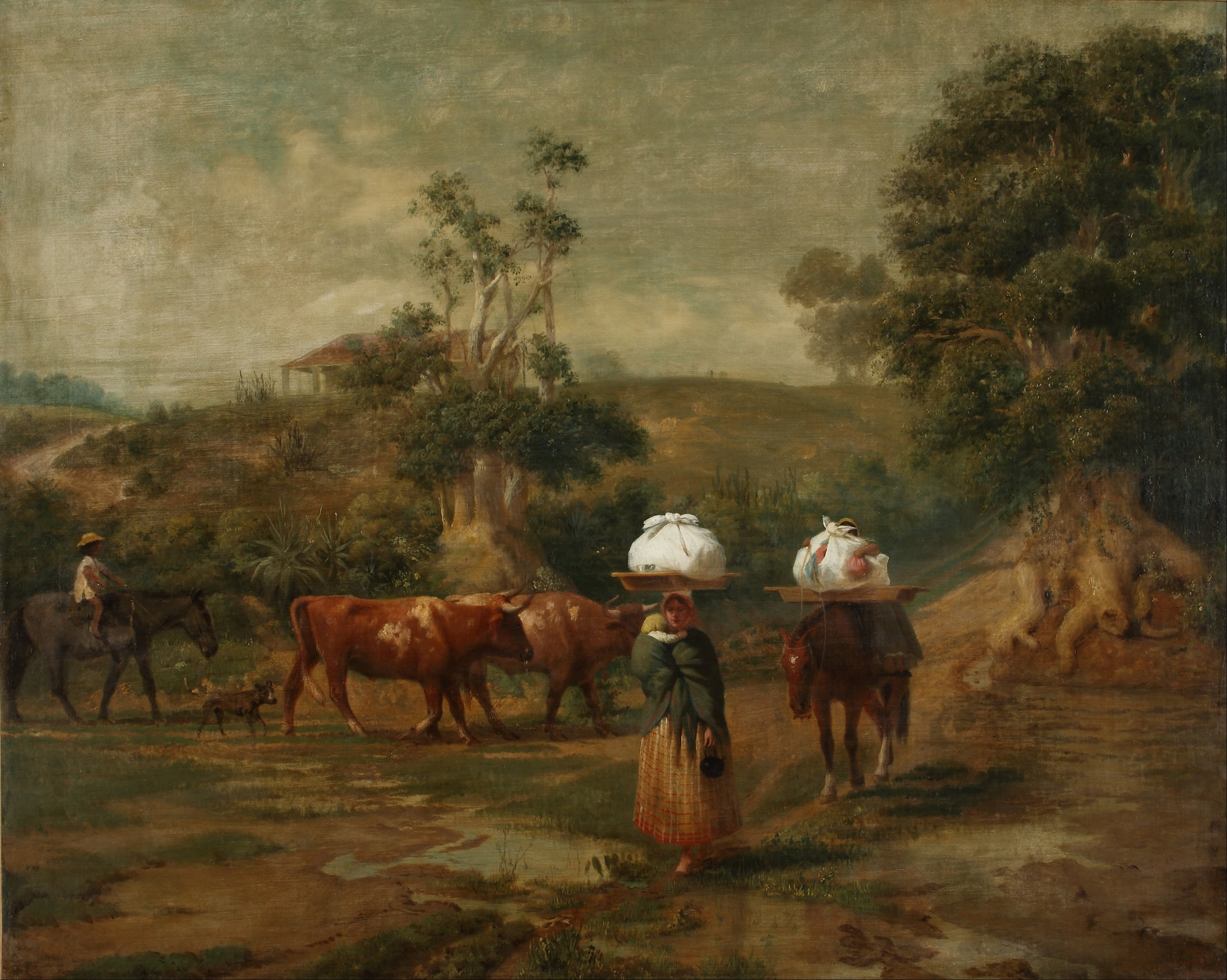
Washerwomen in Bajo Belgrano, painting by Prilidiano Pueyrredón, 1865

Belgrano was named after Manuel Belgrano, a politician and military leader who created the national flag of Argentina. In 1820, at Belgrano's death, Buenos Aires' legislature introduced a law to name the next town to be founded after him. This happened in 1855, when the Buenos Aires government, fearful that relatives of Juan Manuel de Rosas would dispute the governmental decision to expropriate Rosas' lands, laid down a new town on part of it and named it Belgrano. The town was declared a city shortly thereafter, due to its booming growth, and in 1880 it became the nation's capital for a few weeks, because of the dispute between the national government and Buenos Aires province for the status of the city of Buenos Aires. It was in Belgrano that the law declaring Buenos Aires as Argentina's federal capital was issued.

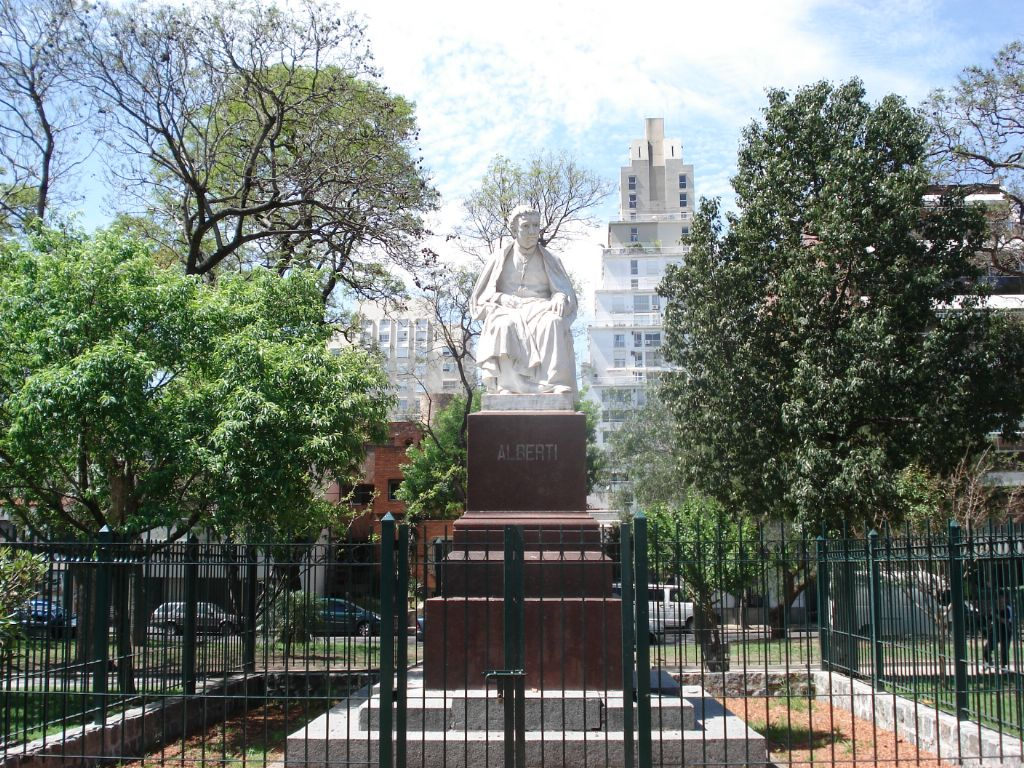
Alberti Sq.

In 1887, the federal district was enlarged by the annexation of the towns (partidos) of Belgrano and Flores.

Between June 2005 and July 2006, Belgrano was the epicentre of a series of shooting attacks by Martín Ríos who eventually killed an 18-year-old man during a mass shooting on Cabildo Avenue.

== Subsections ==
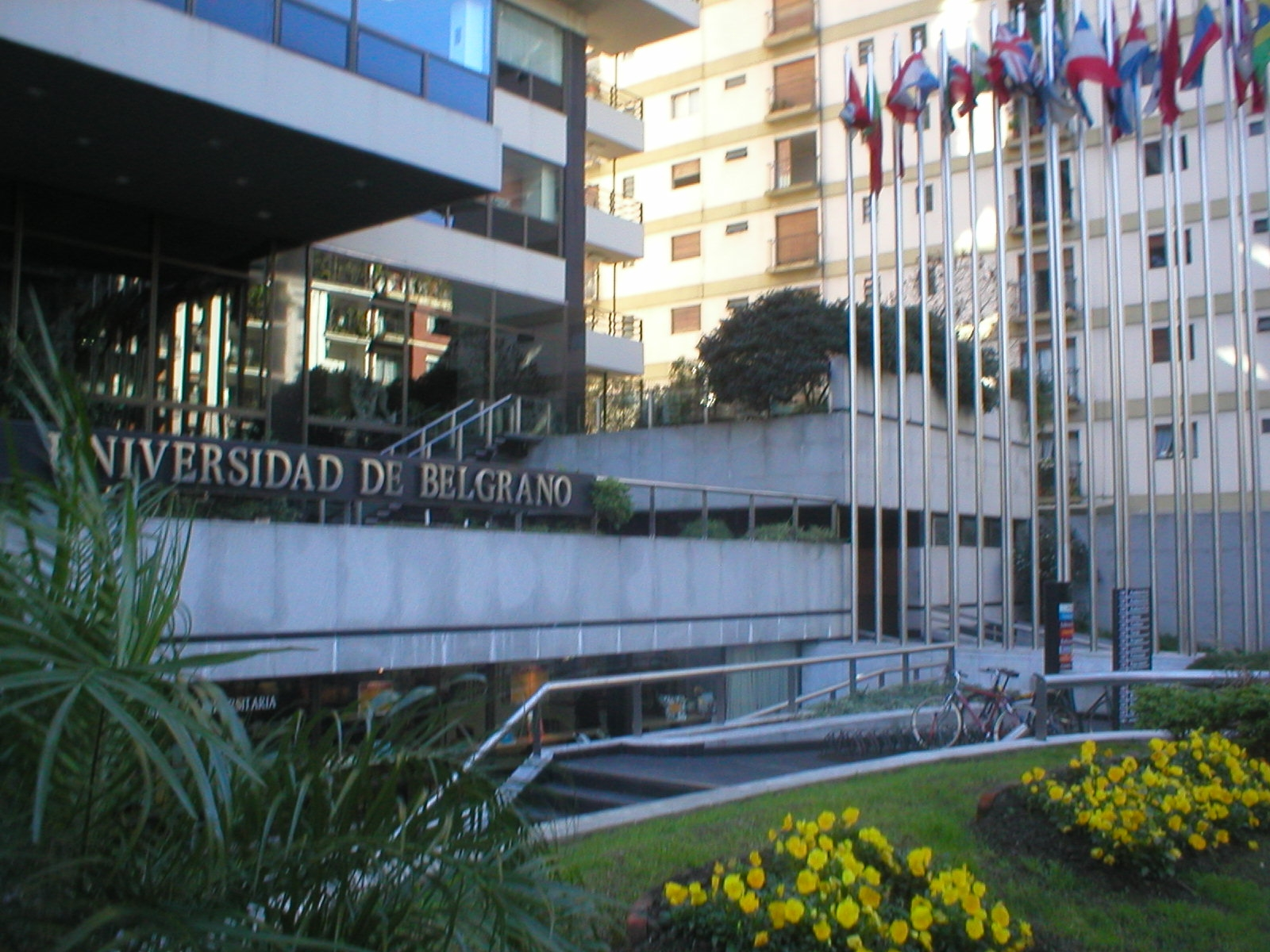
The front of Universidad de Belgrano

Belgrano is an upper-middle-class neighborhood that can be roughly divided into Belgrano R, Belgrano C, central Belgrano, and Lower Belgrano (Bajo Belgrano). The heart of the barrio pulses with life on its main thoroughfare, Avenida Cabildo, which runs Northwest to Southeast; the subway (subte) Line D follows its route.

Avenida Cabildo carries heavy automobile traffic, and features corner cafés, grocery stores, movie theaters, specialty shops, clothing boutiques, bookstores, and other retail venues. Thanks to its wide sidewalks, pedestrians are especially numerous on weekend afternoons as Porteños (residents of Buenos Aires) from various areas of the city come to shop.

Most of the neighborhood's densest housing is located in the vicinity of Cabildo. High-rise luxury apartment buildings are clustered on the leafy streets surrounding the Universidad de Belgrano, a private liberal-arts university.

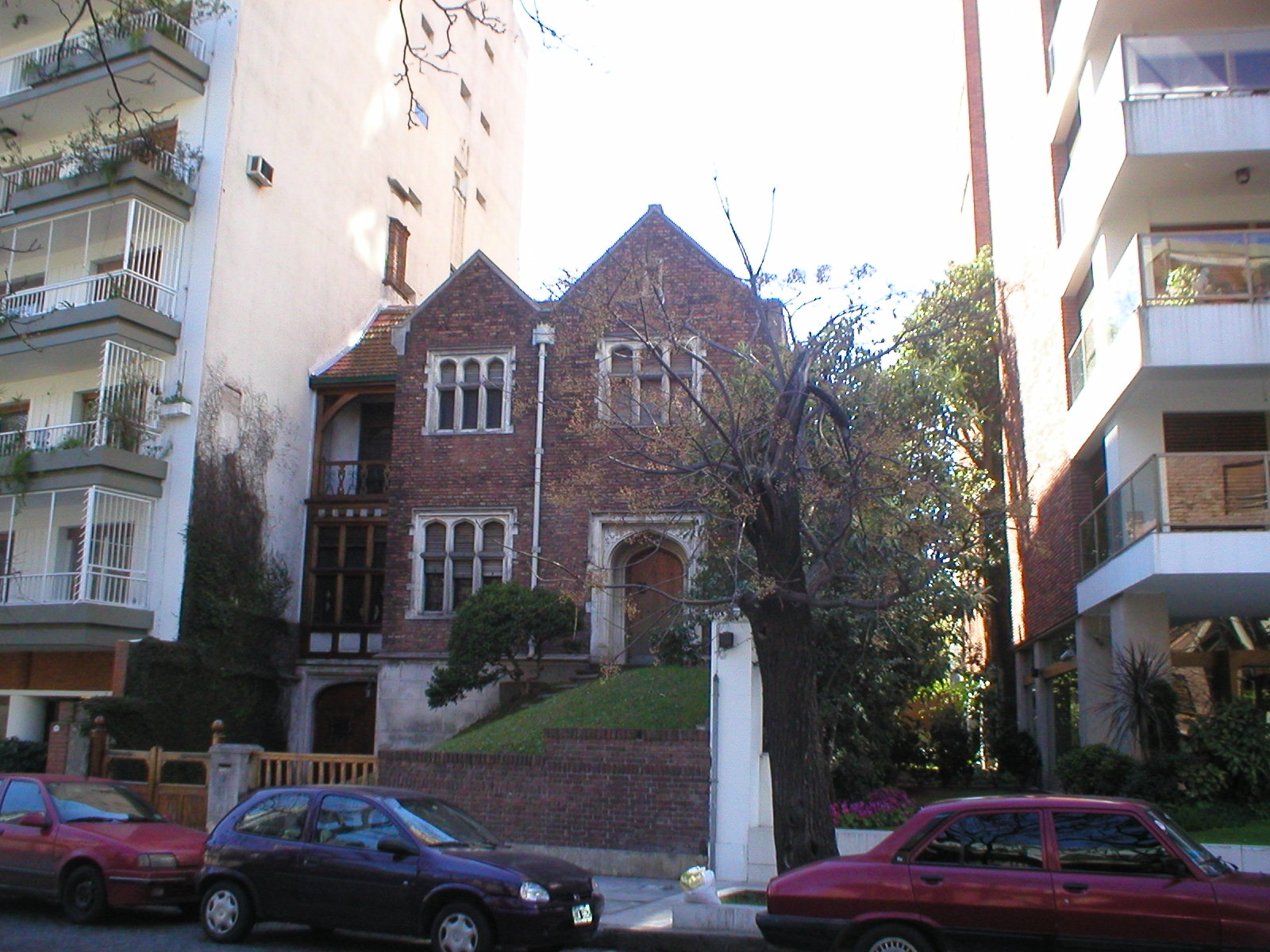
Many older single-family homes have been replaced by high-rise residential structures in the denser sections of Belgrano.

West of Crámer avenue, "Belgrano R" is chiefly residential and lower-density in nature, characterized by calm streets lined with large, mature shade trees. Most buildings in this section are detached single-family homes that follow North American architectural styles; some residences have sizable backyards with swimming pools. This section is favored by wealthy Argentines and expatriate businesspeople, and also by the embassies of Egypt, Japan, Republic of Korea, Tunisia, United Arab Emitates, among others. Some expensive private, bilingual schools are located in the area.

"Belgrano C" is also home to Buenos Aires's small Chinatown. The district is crowded with restaurants and specialty grocery stores catering to Asian-Argentines and to the general public.

== Transportation ==
Other than Cabildo, avenues Libertador, Luis Maria Campos, Crámer, Ricardo Balbín (formerly known as del Tejar), and Figueroa Alcorta run parallel to the riverbank, while Federico Lacroze, Juramento, Monroe and Congreso run from the riverbank to the Southwest direction. Belgrano is served by the Buenos Aires metro line D, many bus lines (notably Colectivo 60), and two commuter rail lines. Approximately 1.5 km to the west of Belgrano lies Avenida General Paz, a major limited-access freeway that defines the city limits of Buenos Aires proper. Beyond this avenue lie the suburbs of Vicente Lopez, Florida and Olivos.

Highrise apartment buildings overlooking Barrancas de Belgrano

== Notable attractions ==
The lush park Barrancas de Belgrano was designed by the famous French-Argentine landscape/park architect Carlos Thays, who designed many open spaces throughout Buenos Aires. Several blocks north of the Belgrano University, Barrancas de Belgrano spans several city blocks and is overlooked by highrise upper-middle class apartment buildings.

On Manuel Belgrano square, a local artisan fair is held regularly, and becomes especially vibrant on weekends. It features a small bust of Manuel Belgrano on its middle spot.

In the edge of the plaza lies the Inmaculada Concepción church, called "La Redonda" (the round one) by locals because of its circular plan. Many weddings are celebrated in this church in the afternoon hours. Two museums are also across Juramento and Cuba streets: Larreta and Sarmiento, respectively. Larreta museum focus on Spanish art. It is located on the former private residence of writer Enrique Larreta, designed by architect Ernesto Bunge on 1882. It features a well kept Andalusian garden. Historical Museum Sarmiento exhibits some objects belonging to former presidents Domingo Faustino Sarmiento and Nicolás Avellaneda. It is located in what used to be Belgrano townhall, where the national congress held its sessions while Belgrano was the capital of the Argentine republic. Nearby, going down to Lower Belgrano (Bajo Belgrano), appears the Barrancas de Belgrano, three squares along together, older Rio de la Plata River natural terraces. Two blocks away, in Lower Bergrano there is the Estadio de Excursionistas, the local football team. Although neighboring Nuñez is widely known as the home of River Plate, its landmark stadium River Plate Stadium—also home of the Argentina national football team—is located within the boundaries of Belgrano.

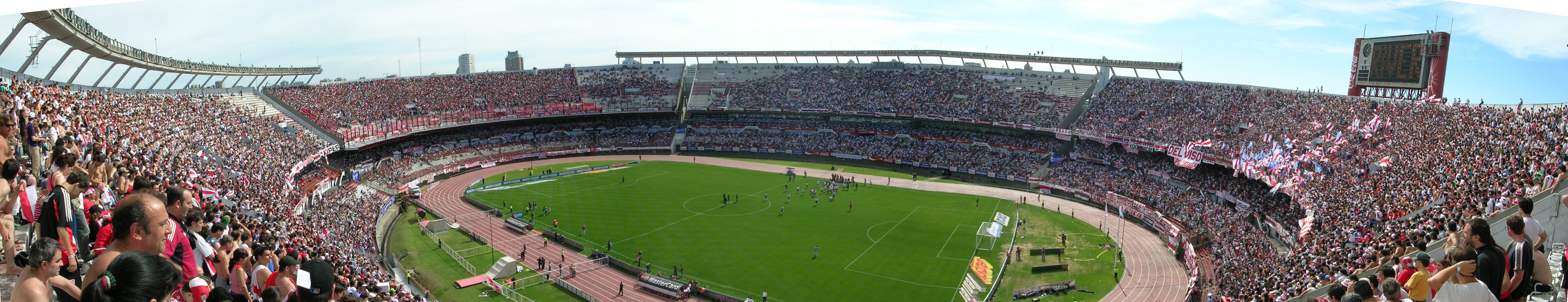
River Plate Stadium

== Image gallery ==
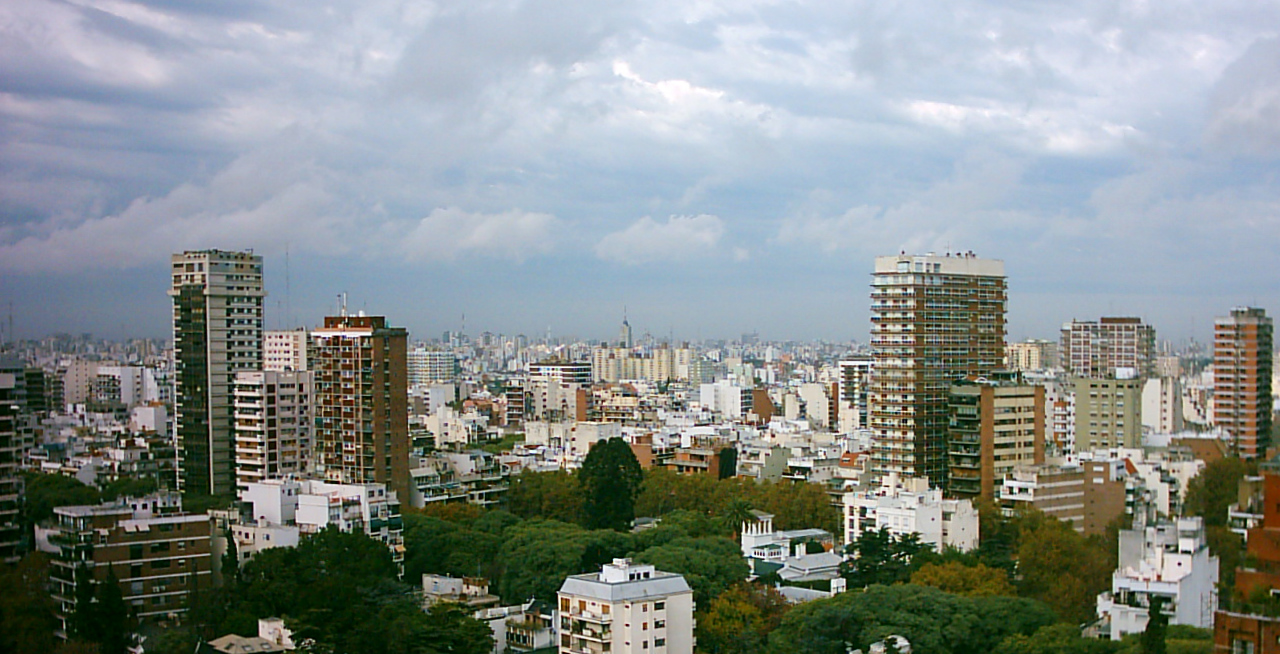
Panorama view of Belgrano

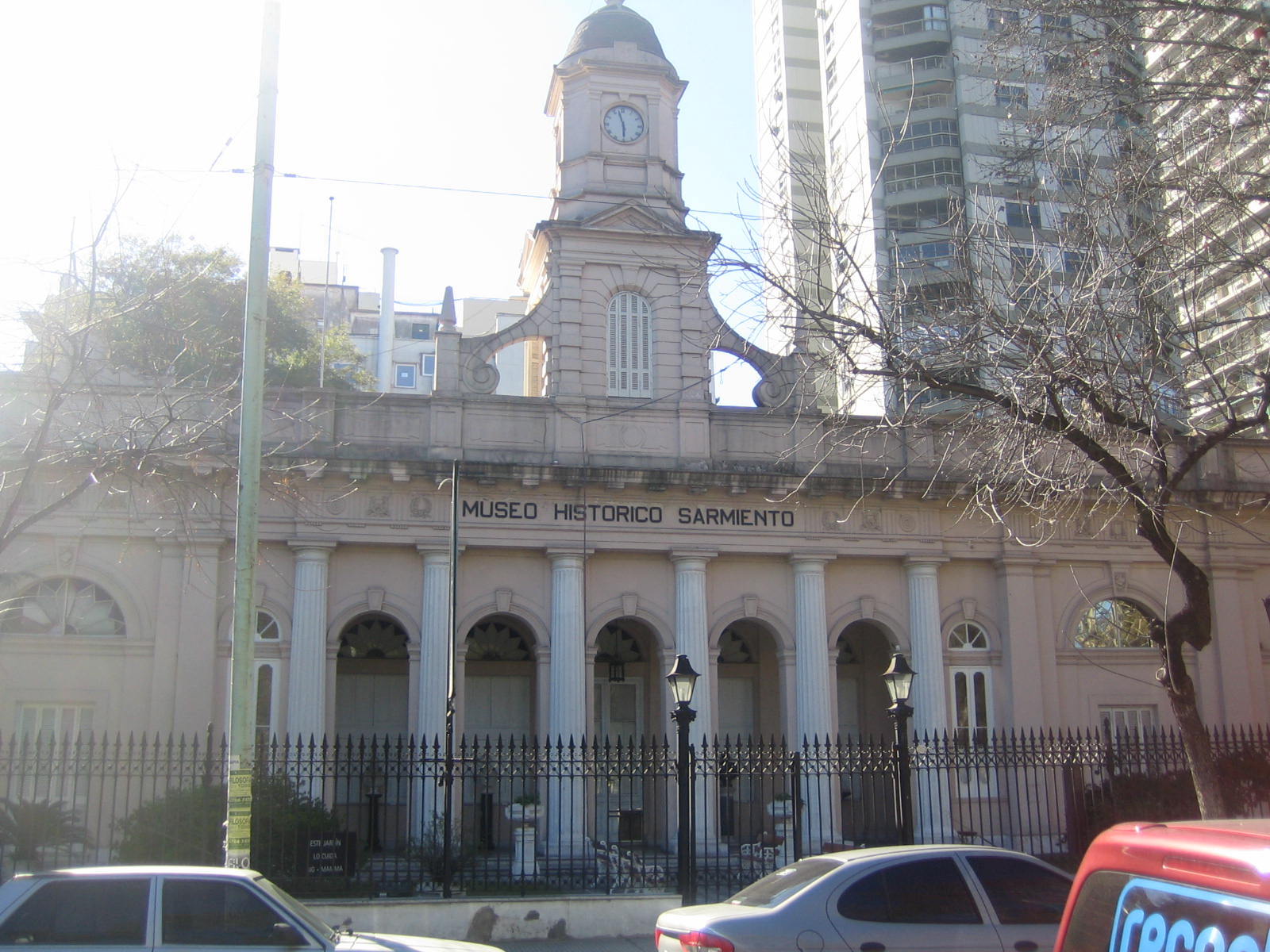
Domingo Sarmiento Historical Museum

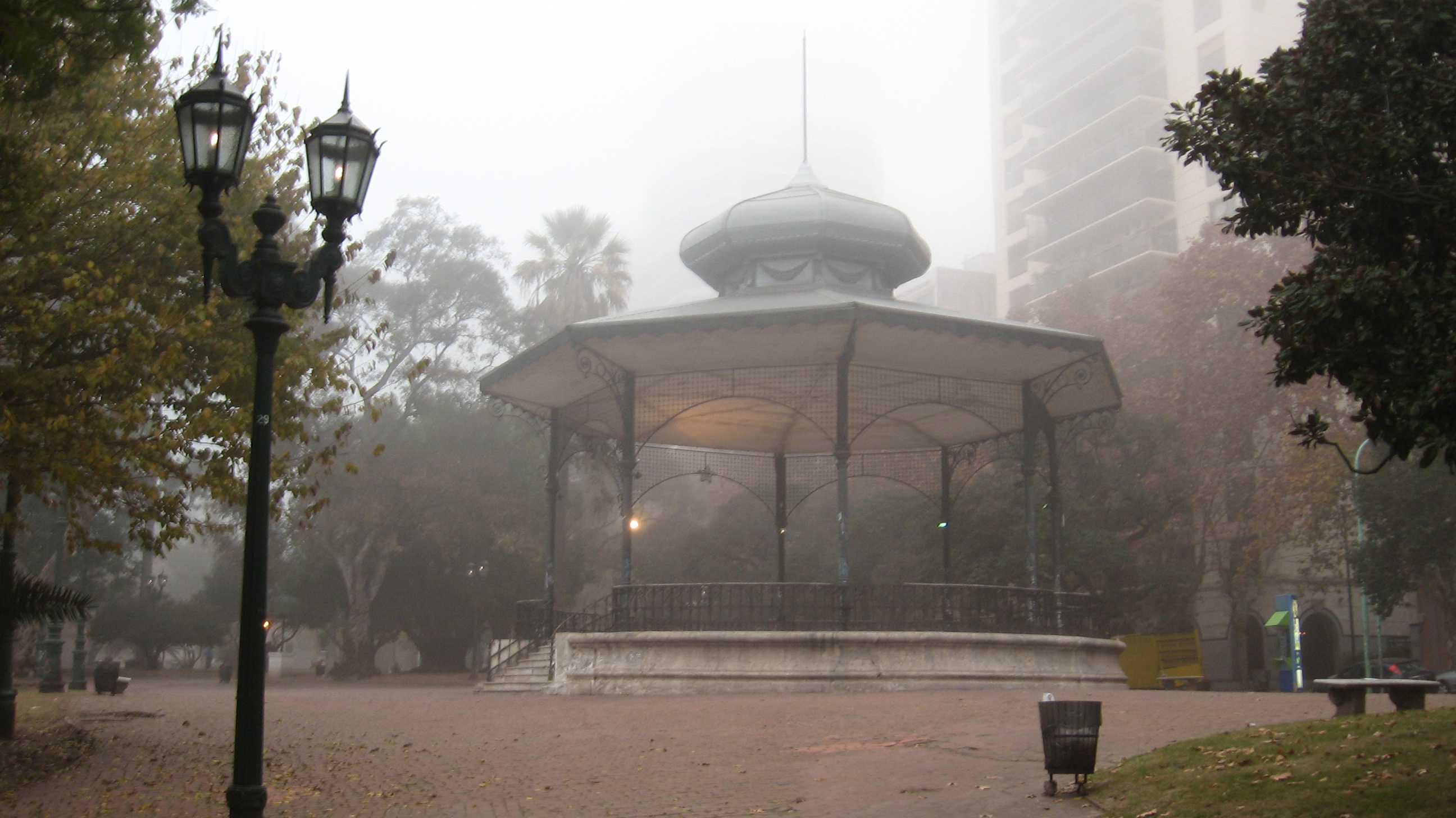
Gazebo at Barrancas Park

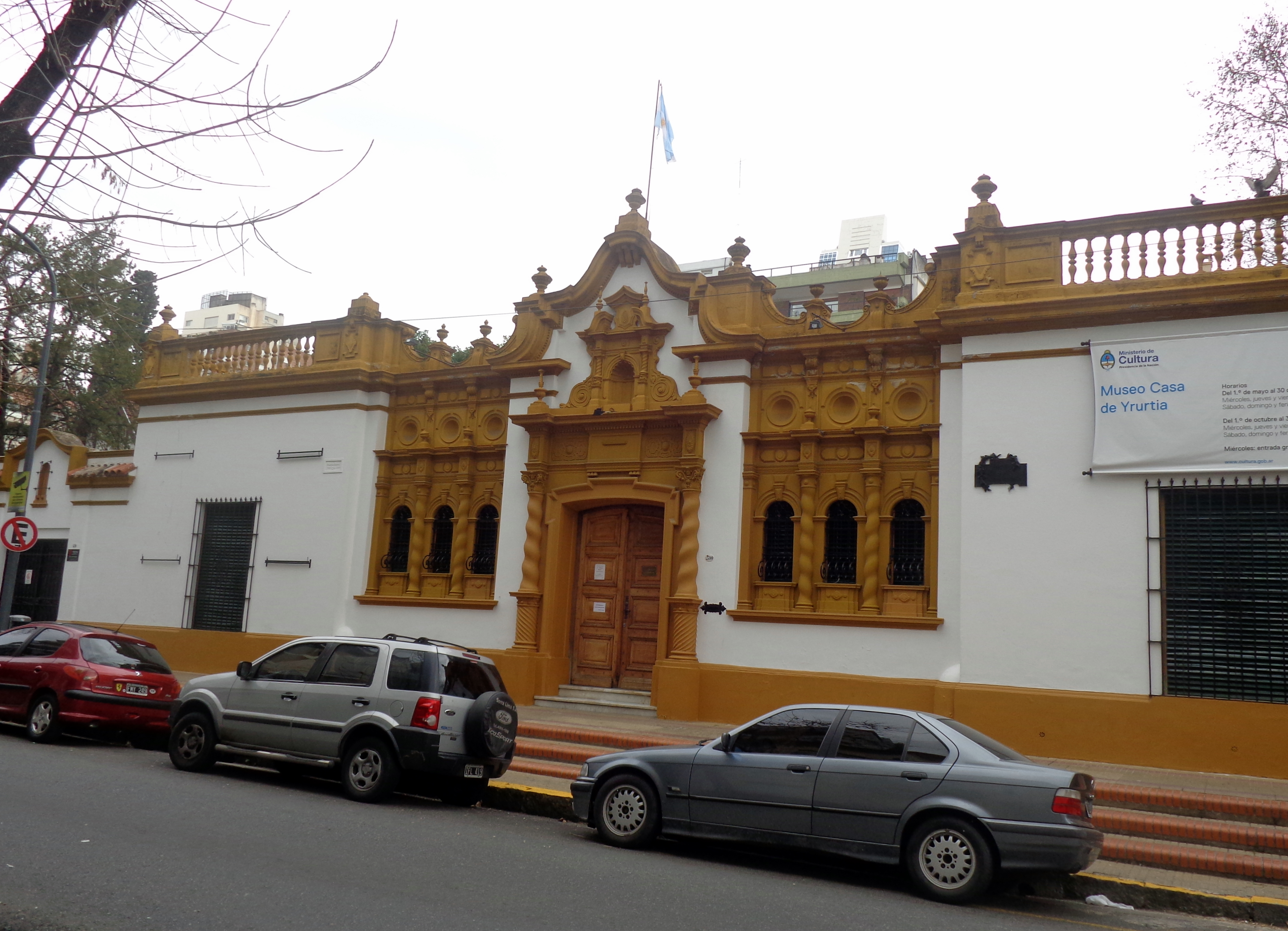
The Rogelio Yrurtia museum

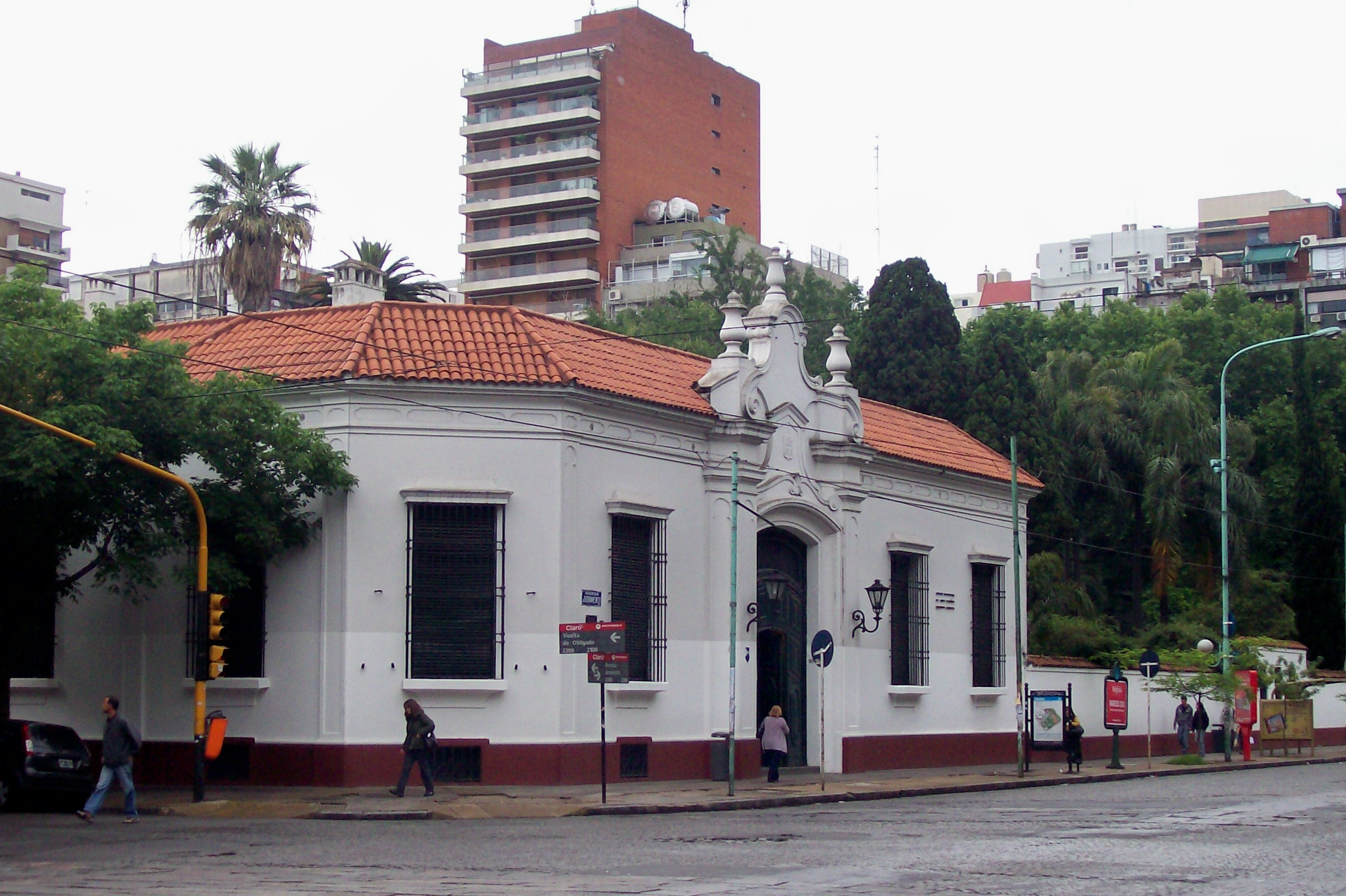
Larreta museum

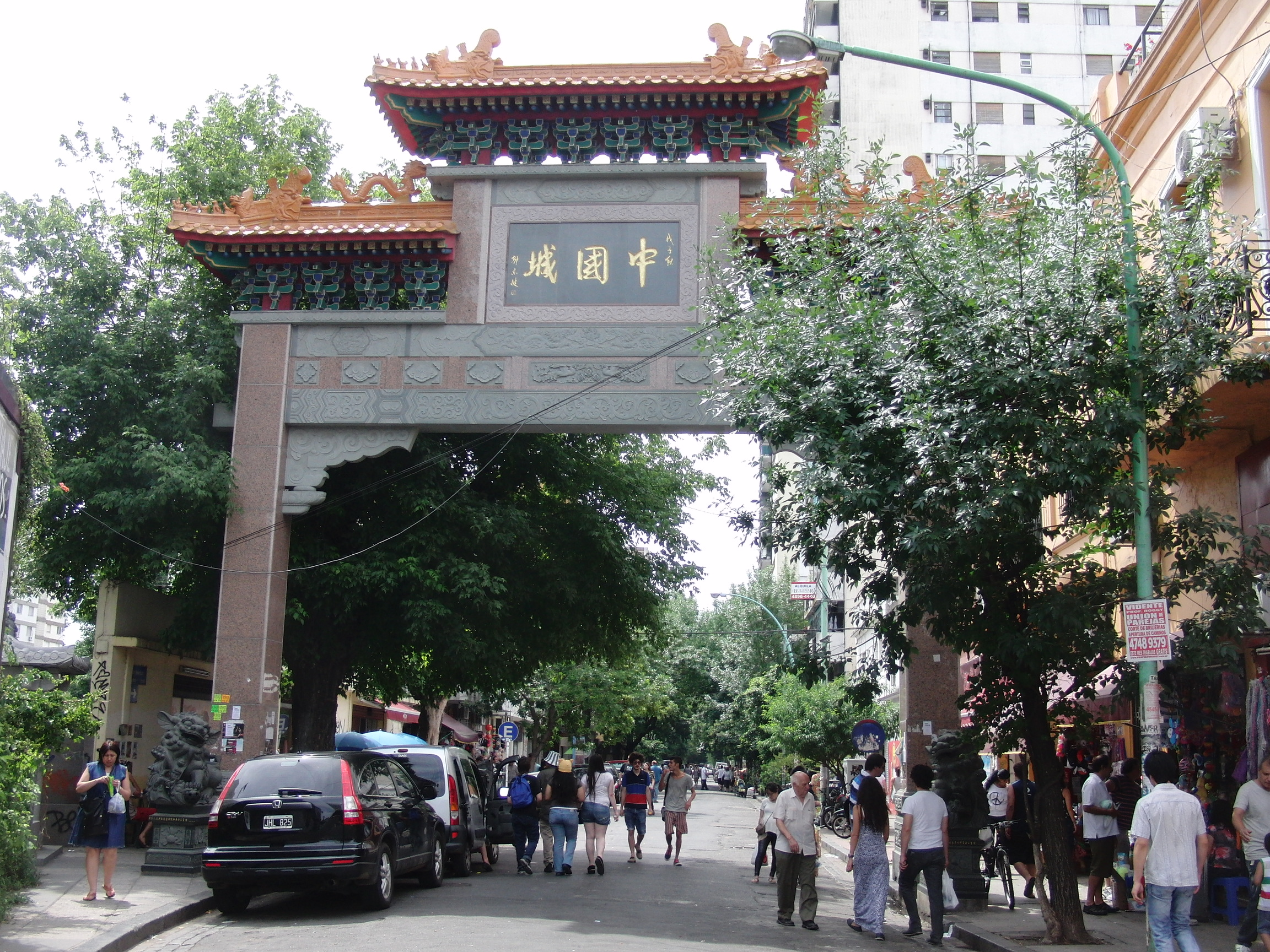
Entrance to Chinatown

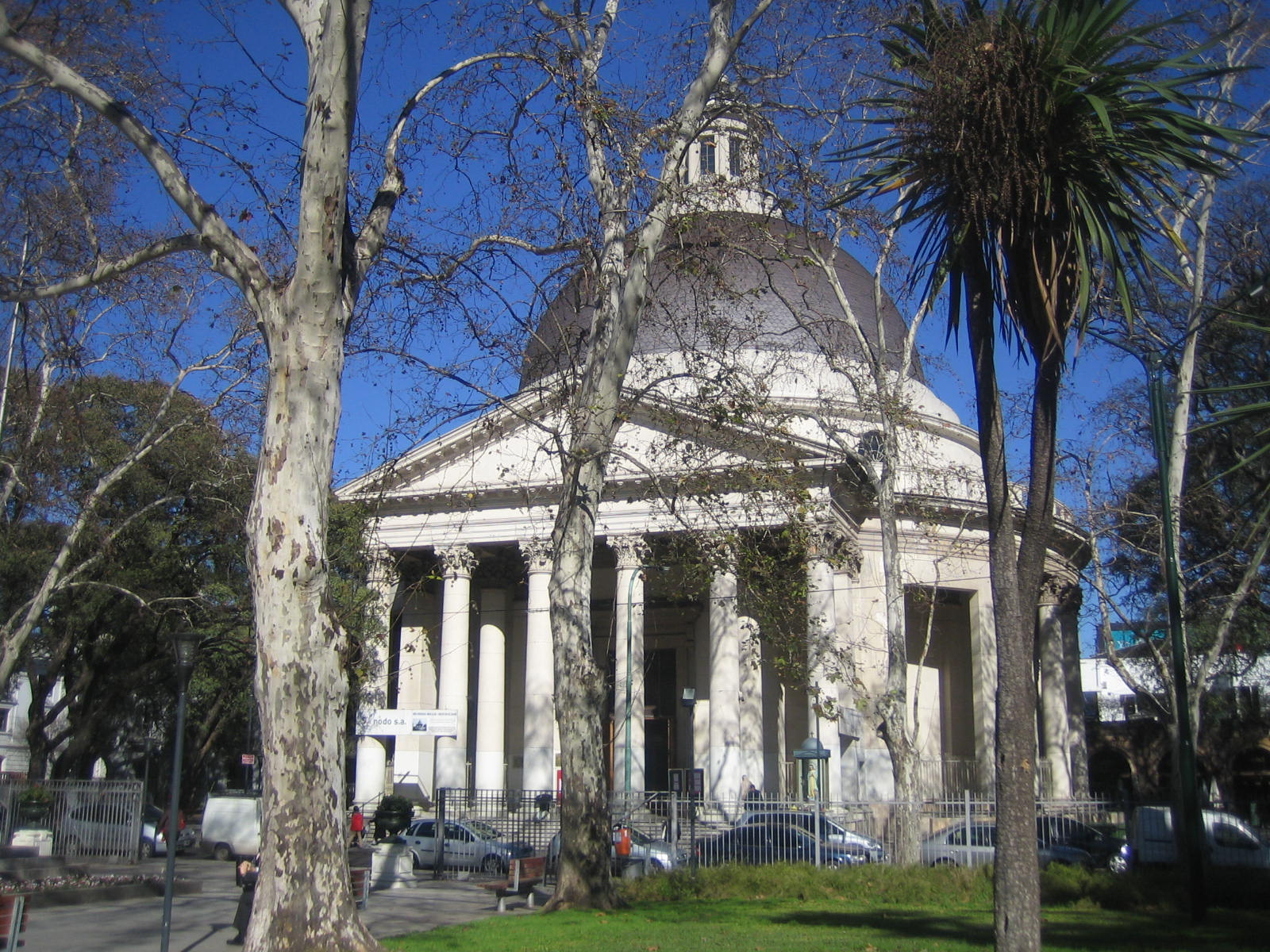
Inmaculada Concepción parish
