= Sarmiento Historical Museum =

Coordinates: 34°33′39.6″S 58°27′15.5″W

Sarmiento History Museum
- Museo Histórico Sarmiento
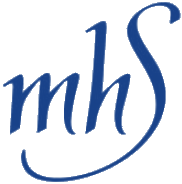

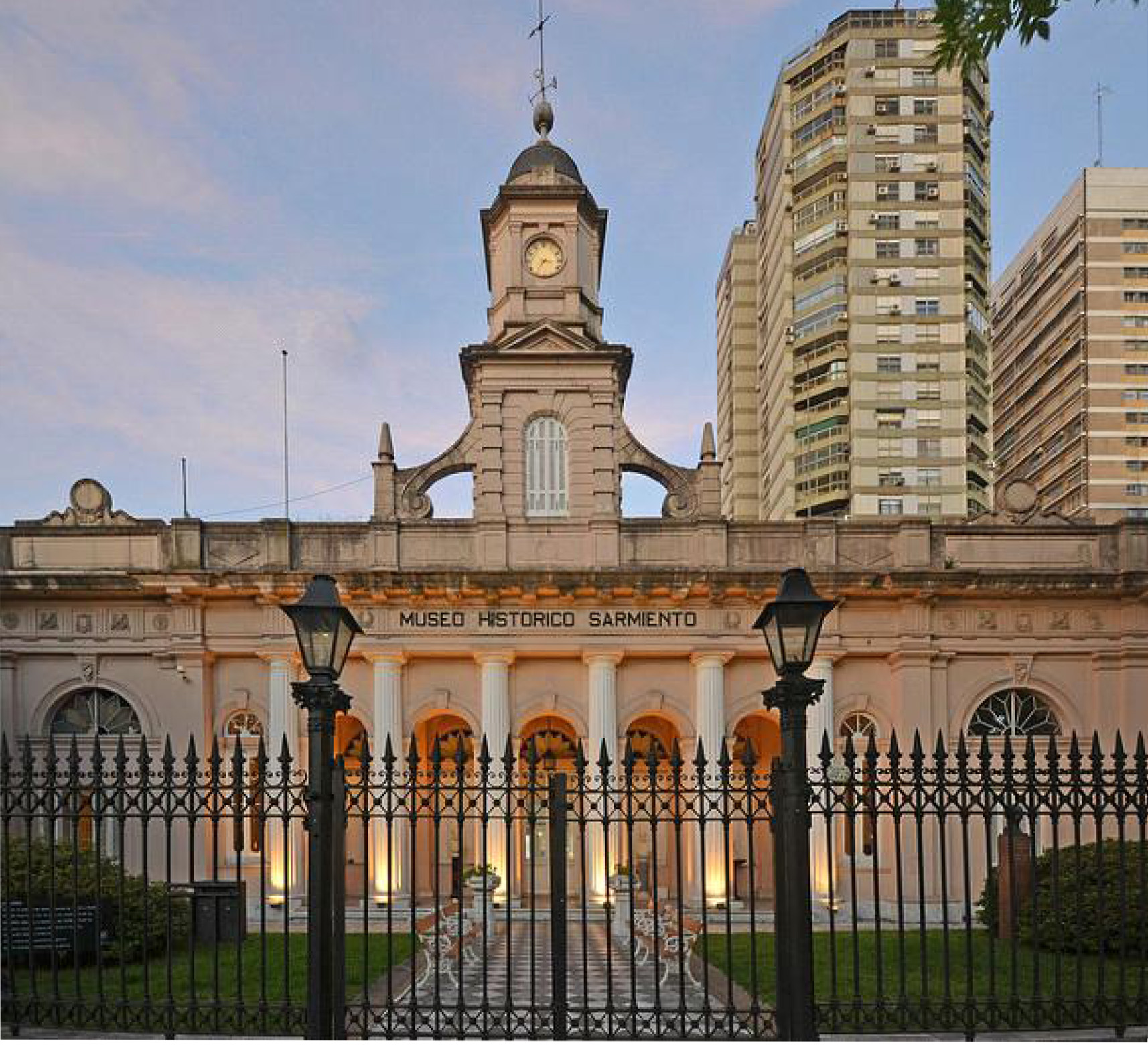
- Facade of the museum in 2019
- Established: 1938; 88 years ago
- Location: Belgrano, Buenos Aires, Argentina
- Type: History museum
- Collections: Furniture, cutlery, period-specific items, objects related to Domingo Faustino Sarmiento
- Architect: Juan Antonio Buschiazzo
- Website: museosarmiento.cultura.gob.ar

National Historic Monument of Argentina

The Sarmiento History Museum (Spanish: Museo Histórico Sarmiento), located in the Buenos Aires neighborhood of Belgrano, is a museum dedicated to Argentine history, and in particular to the Generation of '80 and the life of President Domingo Faustino Sarmiento, a writer and political figure who was President of Argentina between 1868 and 1874.

There are also sections that show the literary works of Nicolás Avellaneda, his presidential successor and about the revolution caused by the federalization of Buenos Aires in 1880, when the national government had to abandon its location in downtown Buenos Aires and move to the building where the museum is today in Belgrano, then the outskirts of the city.

== History ==
=== The building ===
The building is an Italian-style townhouse, built in 1873 as planned by Juan Antonio Buschiazzo, one of the architects brought in the mid-19th century to Argentina by Bernardino Rivadavia. At the time, it housed the executive, legislative and judicial powers of the federal government, when they had to leave Buenos Aires. The National Congress, met in the biggest of it meeting when they declared Buenos Aires as the nation's capital, under president Avellaneda. At the end of the civil war, the Federalization Law was signed in this building. Due to this event, it was declared a National Historic Monument.

In 1938, at the 50th anniversary of Sarmiento's death, the federal government dedicated it as a museum. On 28 July of that year, the mansion was dedicated by presidential decree of then president Roberto Marcelino Ortiz, after a proposal of then head of the Historical Museums Commission Ricardo Levene.

The Sarmiento Museum was declared National Historic Monument of Argentina.

=== The collection ===
The museum displays some of Sarmiento's belongings, as established by Law #12556. In 1913 his grandchildren donated other objects of his to the collection. The museum's collection contains furniture, and various sets of cutlery obtained by the president during his travels.

== Rooms ==
=== Sarmiento Room ===
Used for temporary exhibitions
Has a portrait of Sarmiento by his granddaughter Eugenia Belin Sarmiento and showcases with different objects of daily use.
Bedroom
This room displays the period from 1811 to 1841 in chronological order. It contains Victorian furniture from Sarmiento's home in Buenos Aires.
Dining room
Another portrait of the president by his granddaughter, Eugenia Belin Sarmiento, plus some personal objects.
Facundo's room
This room commemorates the work on Facundo: Civilization and Barbarism written by Sarmiento, showing old editions and copies from editions in other languages.

== Gallery ==
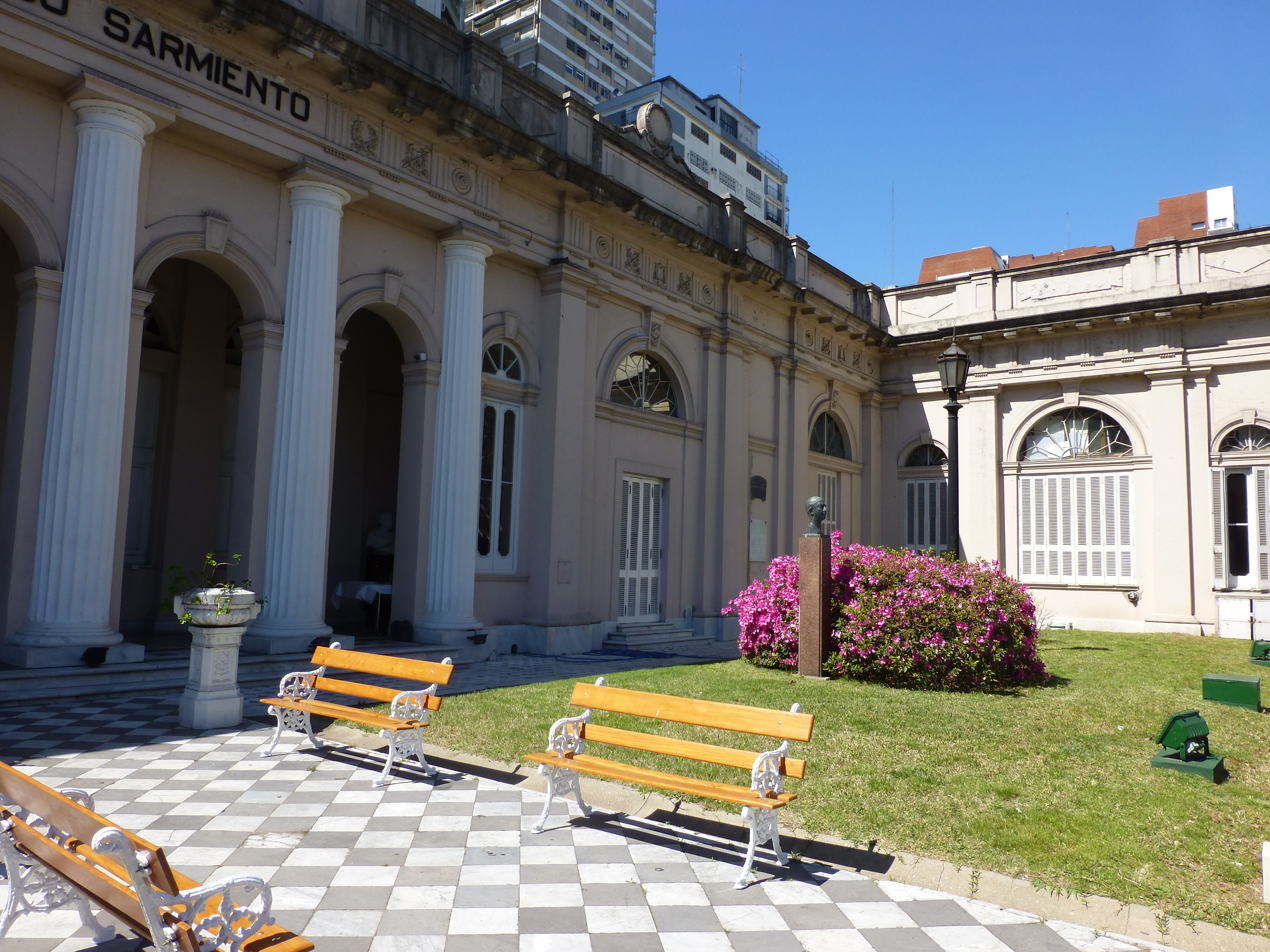

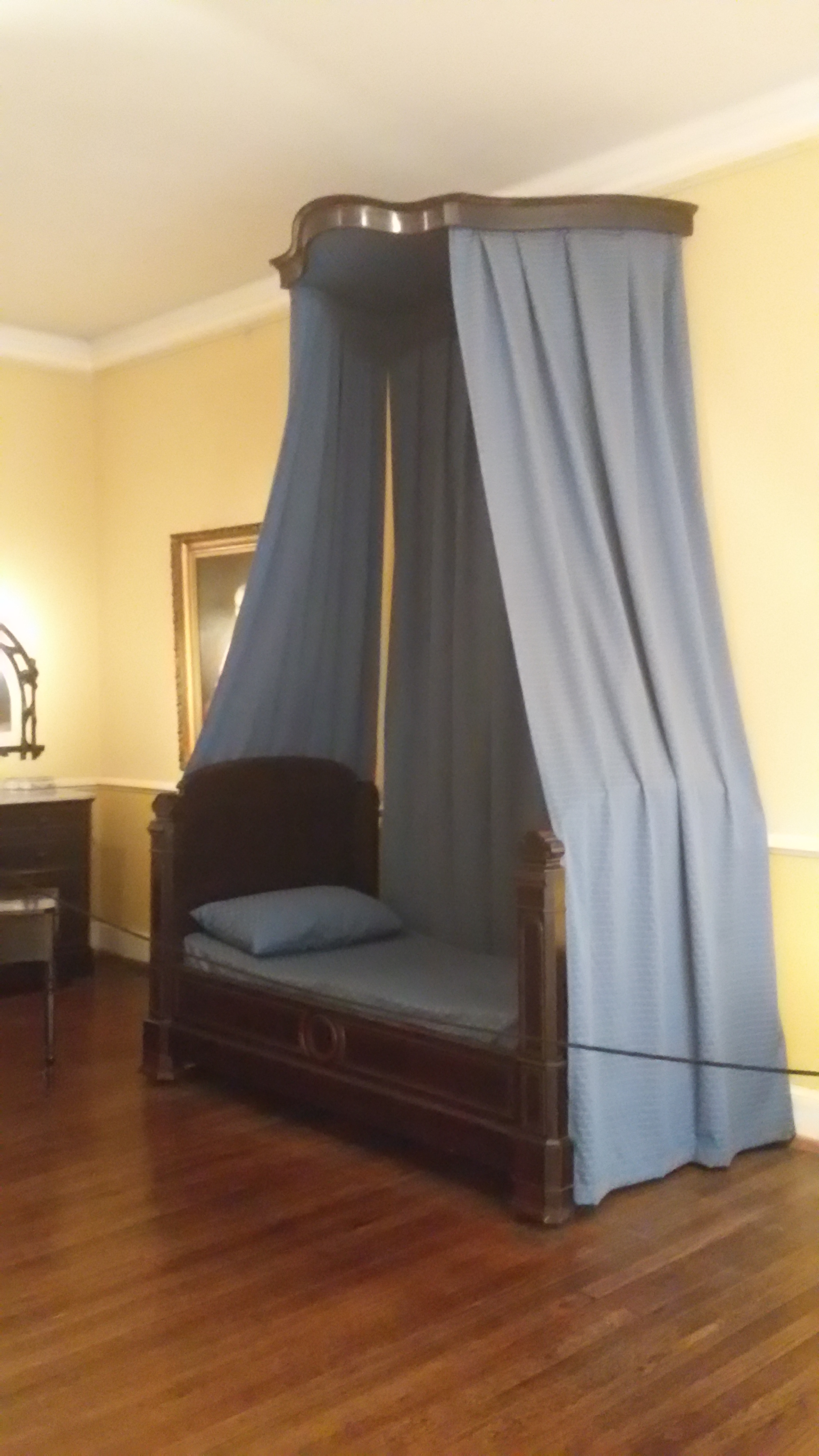

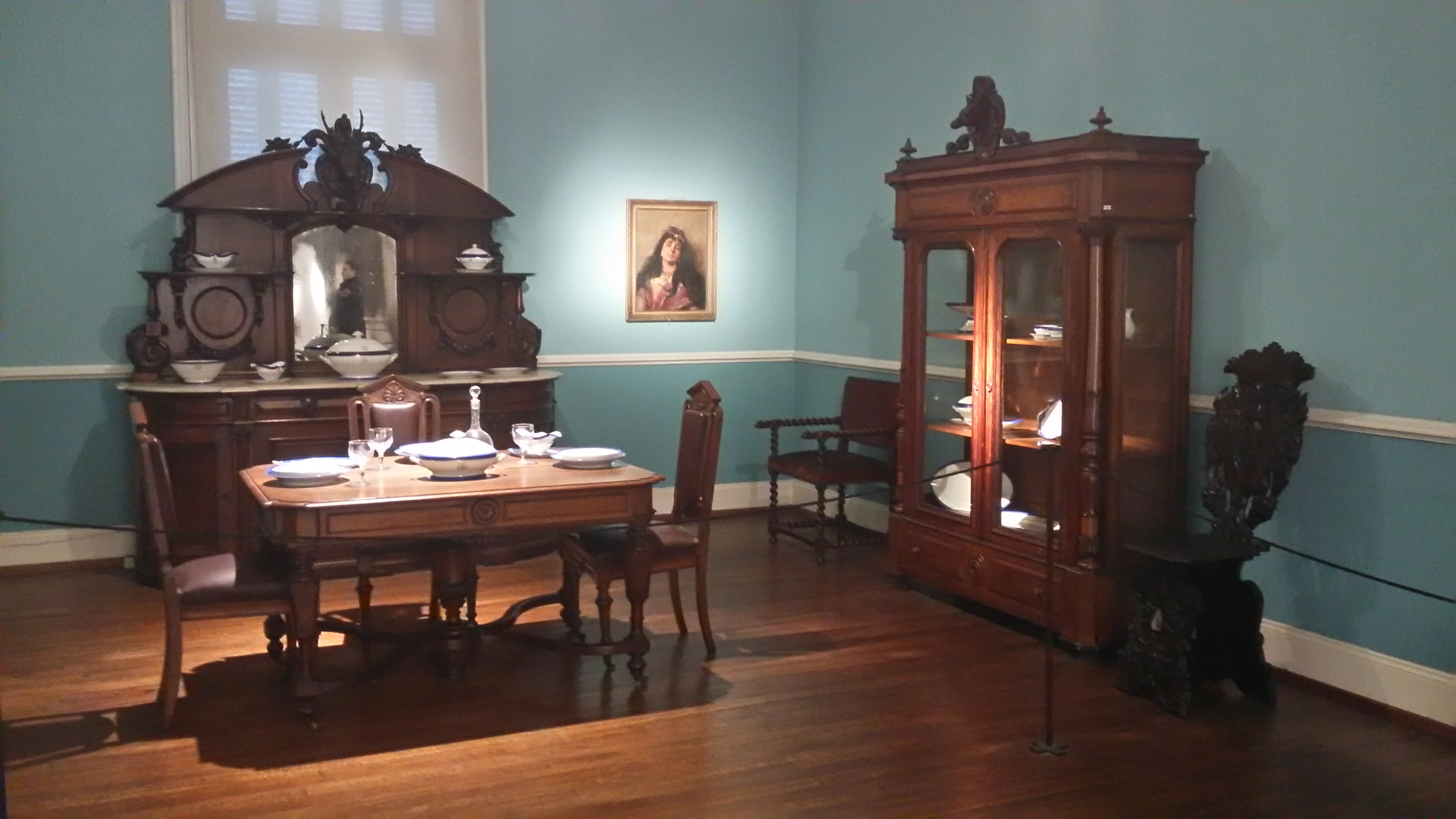

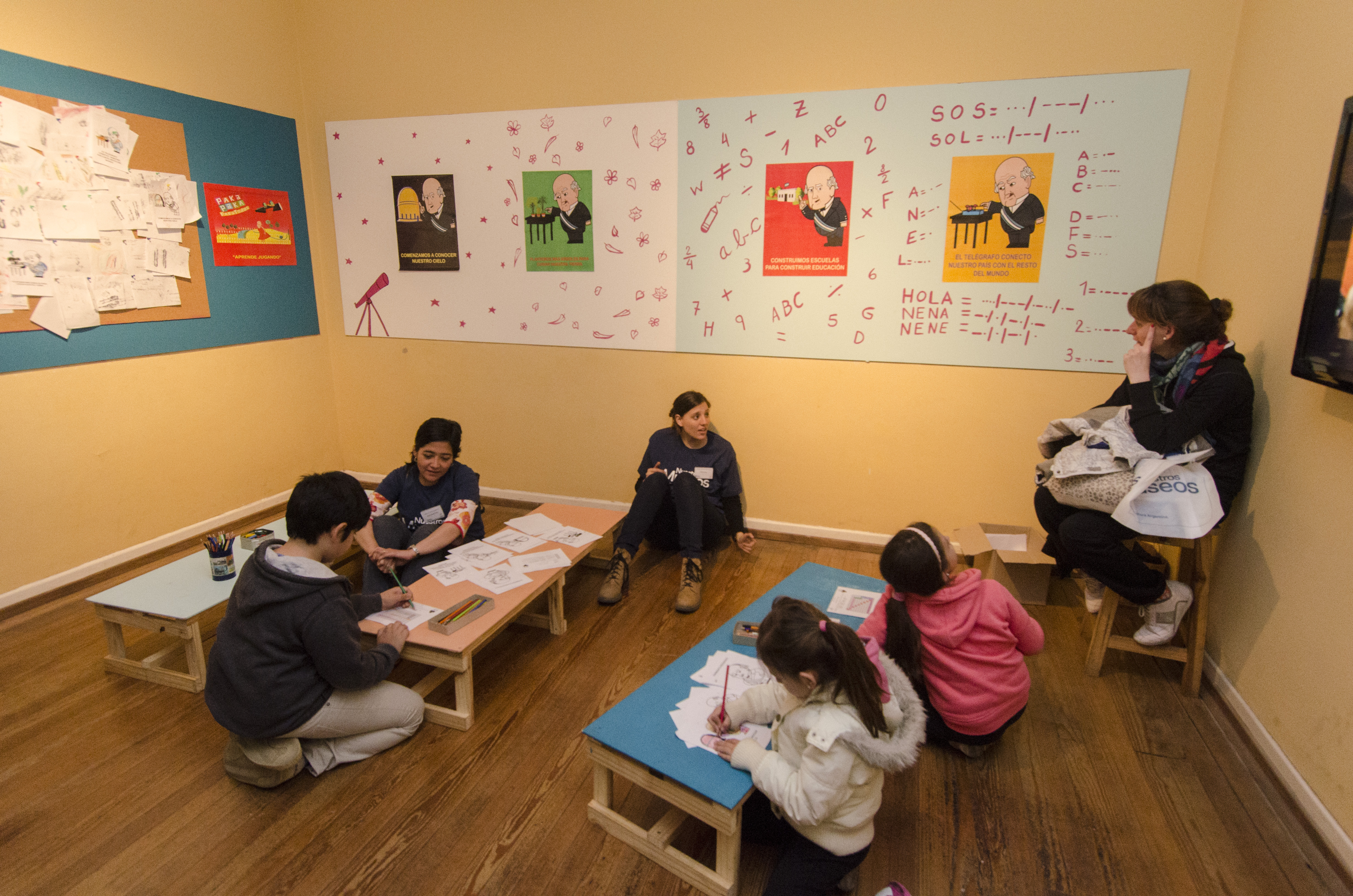

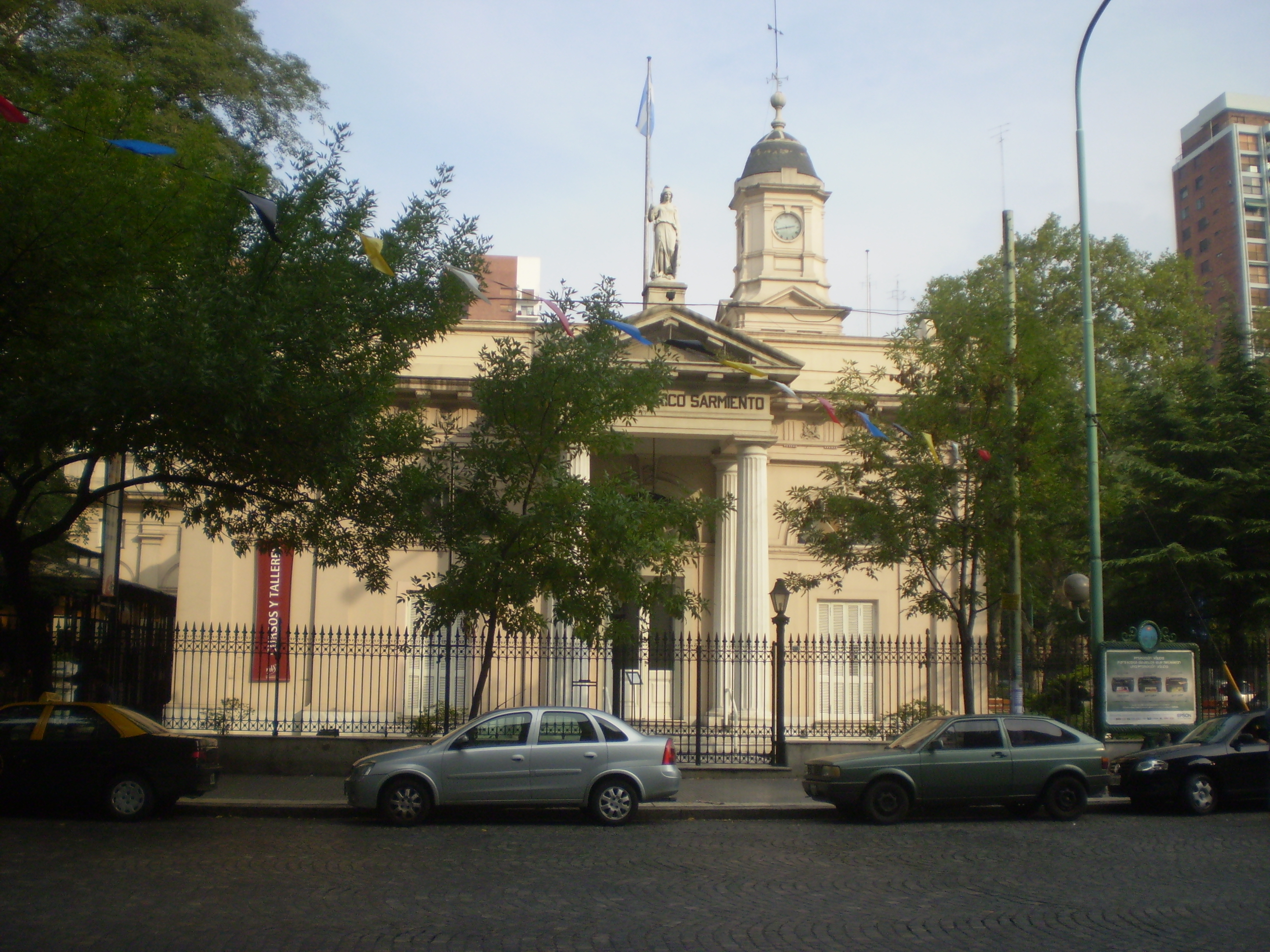

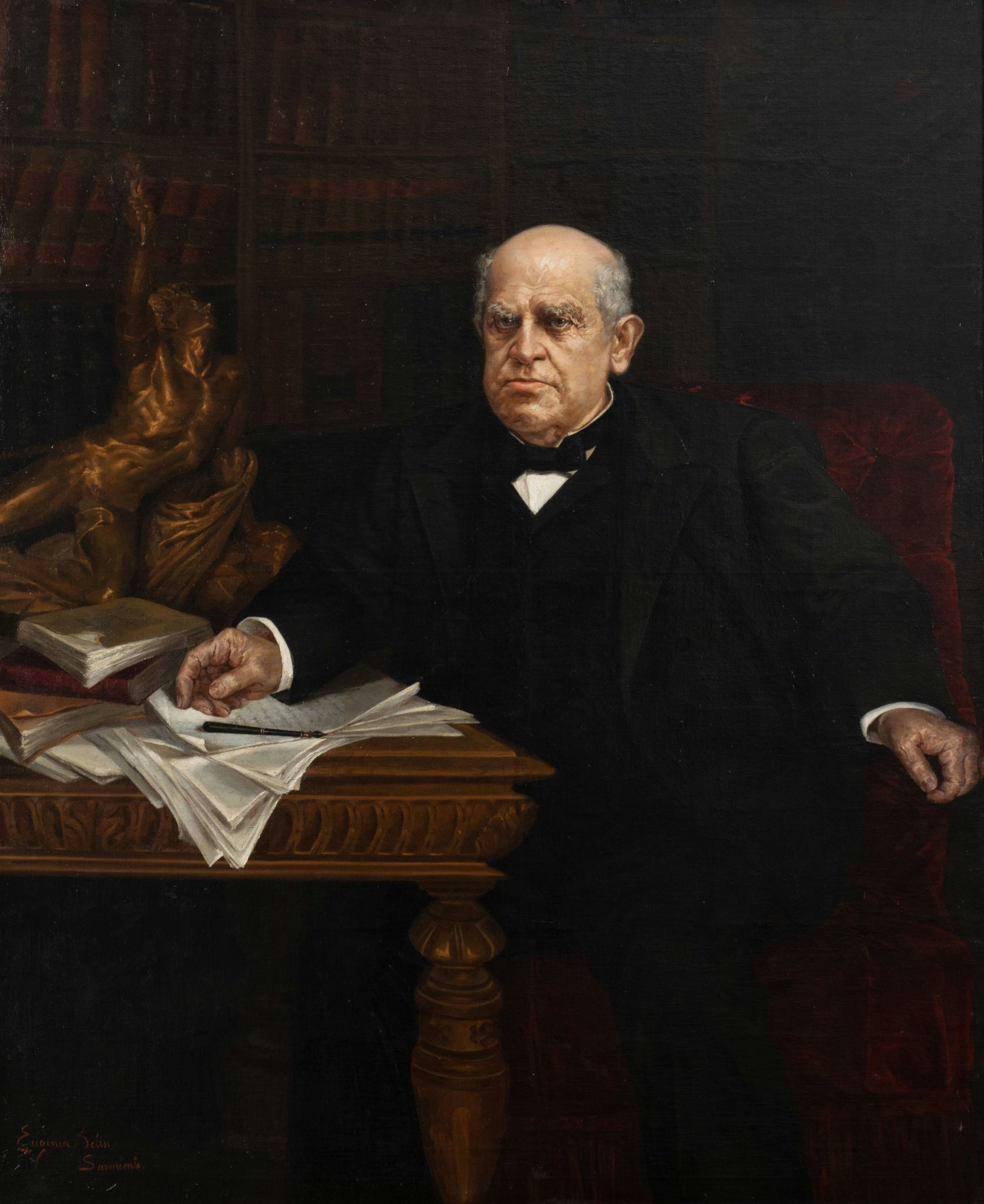
