= Giuseppe Agujari =

Italian-Argentine painter

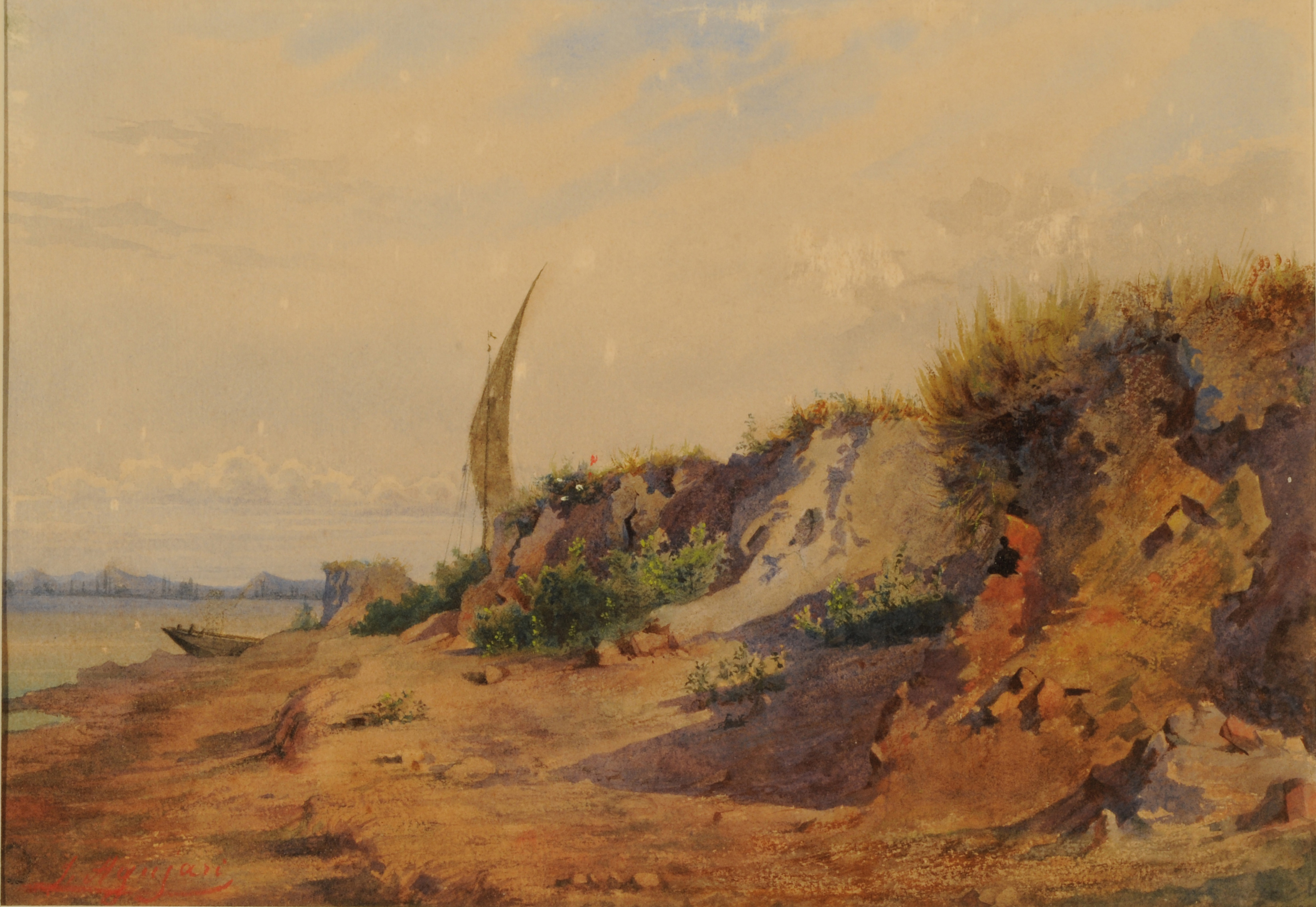
Barrancas del Paraná, Museo Nacional de Bellas Artes, Buenos Aires.

Giuseppe Agujari (1843 – September 16, 1885), also known as Jose Agujari, was an Italian-Argentine painter, known mainly for his watercolors.

== Life and works ==
Agujari was born in Adria near Trieste, then in the Austrian Empire, to Leopoldo and Laura Tretti.

After studying at the Academy of Fine Arts in Venice, he later enrolled at the Municipal Technical School of Trieste, where his brother Tito Agujari was his tutor. Here, he perfected the techniques of drawing and watercolor.

In 1871 he exhibited many of his works at the Royal Academy of Arts in London. In the same year he moved to Buenos Aires, Argentina, where he became a lecturer at the National College.

In 1876 he was part of a group that founded the Sociedad de Estimulo des Bellas Artes, becoming the first president.

Agujari died in 1885 in Buenos Aires. Many of his works are preserved in the Fernandez Blanco Museum in Buenos Aires.
