= Barrio Chino (Buenos Aires) =

Unofficial neighbourhood in Belgrano, Buenos Aires, Argentina

- Unofficial Neighbourhood
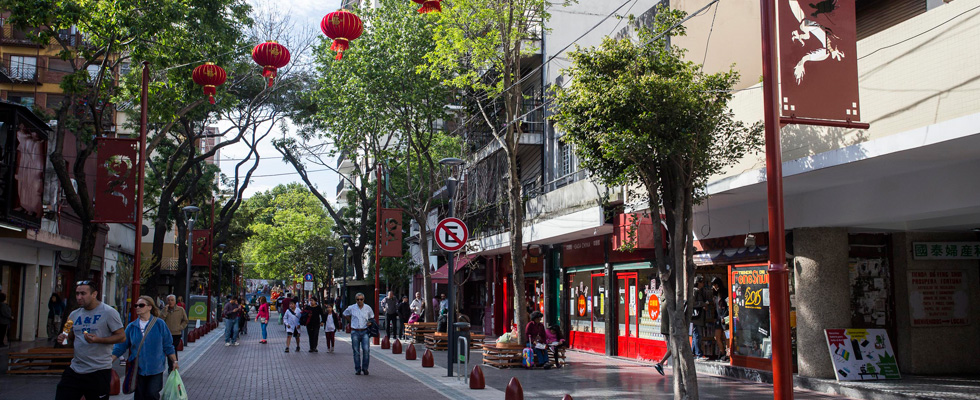
- Interactive map of Barrio Chino
- Coordinates: 34°33′28″S 58°27′00″W
- Country: Argentina
- Autonomous City: Buenos Aires
- Barrio: Belgrano

Barrio Chino
- Traditional Chinese: 布宜諾斯艾利斯唐人街
- Simplified Chinese: 布宜诺斯艾利斯唐人街
Transcriptions
Standard Mandarin
- Hanyu Pinyin: Bù yí nuò sī ài lì sī tángrénjiē
Yue: Cantonese
- Jyutping: bou3 ji4 nok6 si1 ngaai6 lei6 si1 tong4 jan4 gaai1

Buenos Aires' Chinatown, locally known as Barrio Chino, is a largely commercial section about five blocks long in the barrio of Belgrano, Buenos Aires. The Asian community living in Belgrano is less than 0.5% of the ward's total. Despite the designation of this Belgrano enclave as a Chinese ethnic enclave, the area is populated by different Asian communities, with a predominance of Taiwanese people.

== Overview ==
This neighbourhood contains several Chinese restaurants, grocery stores, and a Buddhist temple. It is the core centre of the Chinese community in Argentina. The neighbourhood began to develop in the 1980s when newly arrived Taiwanese and mainland Chinese immigrants settled in this area.

The neighbourhood is also known for its celebration of the Chinese New Year. On January 22 the streets of South Belgrano dress up in bright red and golden yellow, as dragon-like puppets and chariots run through the streets undulating and waving to the rhythm of traditional Chinese music.

A proposal for the creation of Chinatown as an official barrio of Buenos Aires was promoted by a group of Asian businessmen for commercial purposes in 2006. The requested designation was without success, however, because "Chinatown" didn't reflect the real population structure of Belgrano, which is populated overwhelmingly by people who are not Asian in origin but European.

== The Arch ==
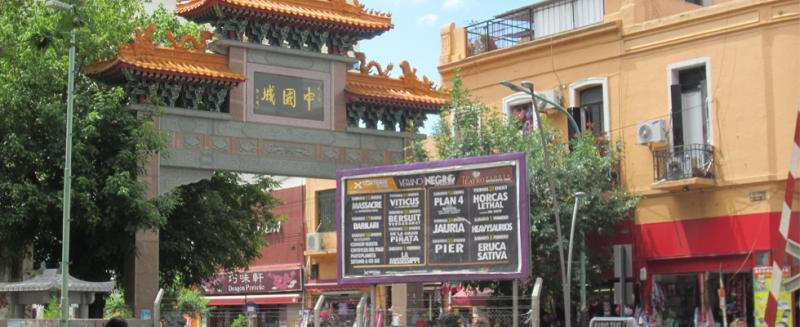
Entrance to Chinatown, featuring its controversial paifang, an alleged donation from the Chinese government.

In 2009 an entrance arch was installed on Arribeños Street, a gift for the Argentina Bicentennial. Brought from China, at a cost of approximately $500,000, contributed by the Chinese Government without following municipal laws and requirements, as it lacked formal authorization from the Foreign Ministry of Argentina. There are several ongoing formal complaints about the numerous irregularities that exist in this donation. The donation of this arch had been rejected by competent bodies on two occasions: by the Department of City Planning in 2006 and by the Evaluation Commission Acceptance of Donations Monuments and the Legislature of the Government of the City in 2007.

The installation of this arch, and its having been done without consultation is an issue of contention among neighbourhood residents (among them Taiwanese) who do not adhere to the Chinese Communist Party, and therefore view the arch as an imposition in their Buenos Aires home by the People's Republic of China.

=== Dedication plaque ===
Chinese Arch

The Chinese community in Argentina
donates with affection this Arch
on the occasion of the Bicentennial of May Revolution
to the beautiful city of Buenos Aires and the great Argentine people
thanking the generosity and love given to Chinese immigrants
with the hope that the Chinese-Argentine friendship
will last from generation to generation.

July 8, 2009

== See also ==
- Chinese Argentine
- Buddhism in Argentina
