= Tito Agujari =

Italian portraitist and history painter (1834–1908)

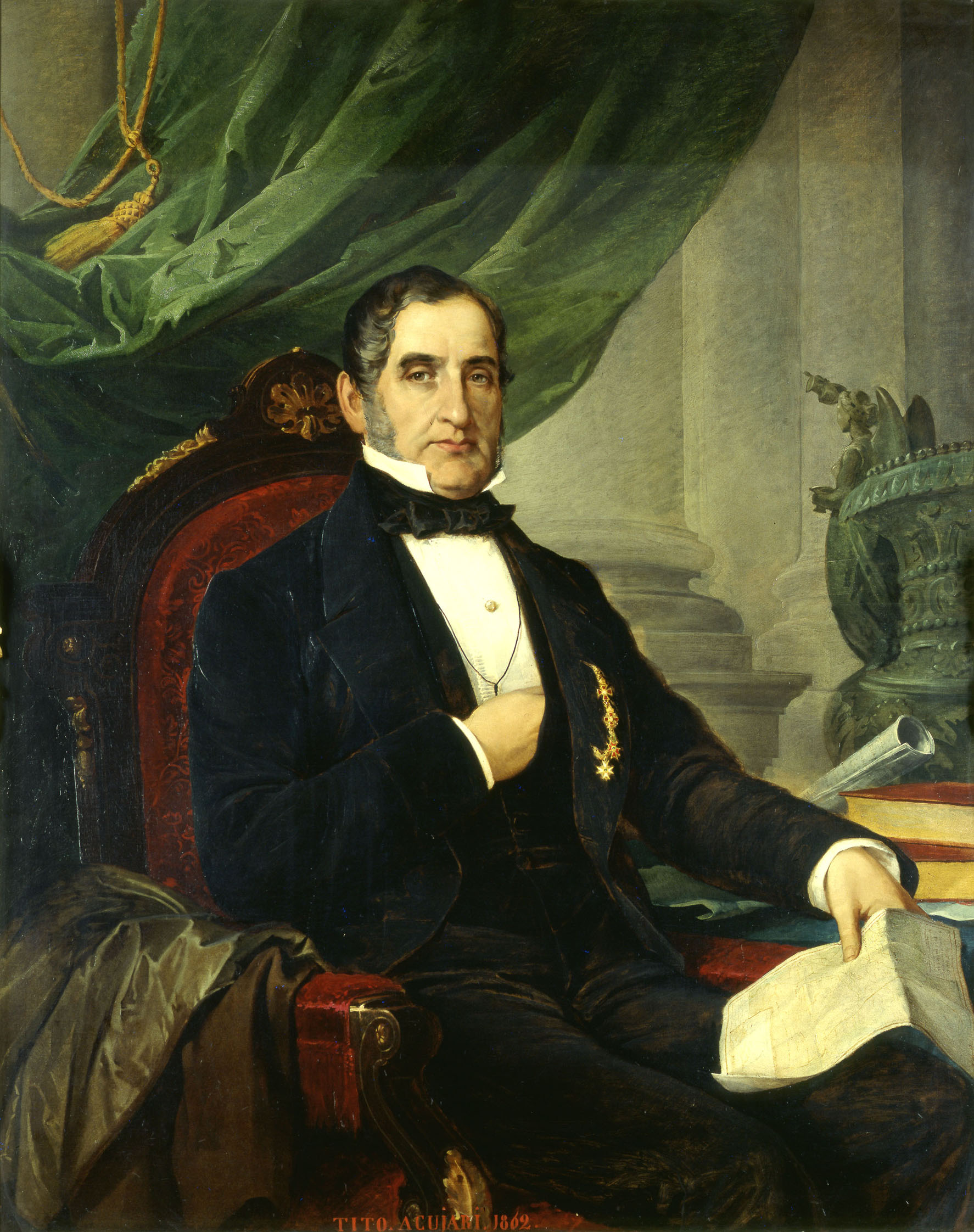
Pasquale Revoltella, painted by Tito Agujari

Tito Agujari (25 April 1834 – 2 November 1908) was an Italian portraitist and history painter.

== Biography ==
He first began learning to paint at the Academy of Fine Arts, and then began travelling to Trieste to learn more. He also travelled to England and France later in his life to learn.
