= List of art museums =

== Africa ==
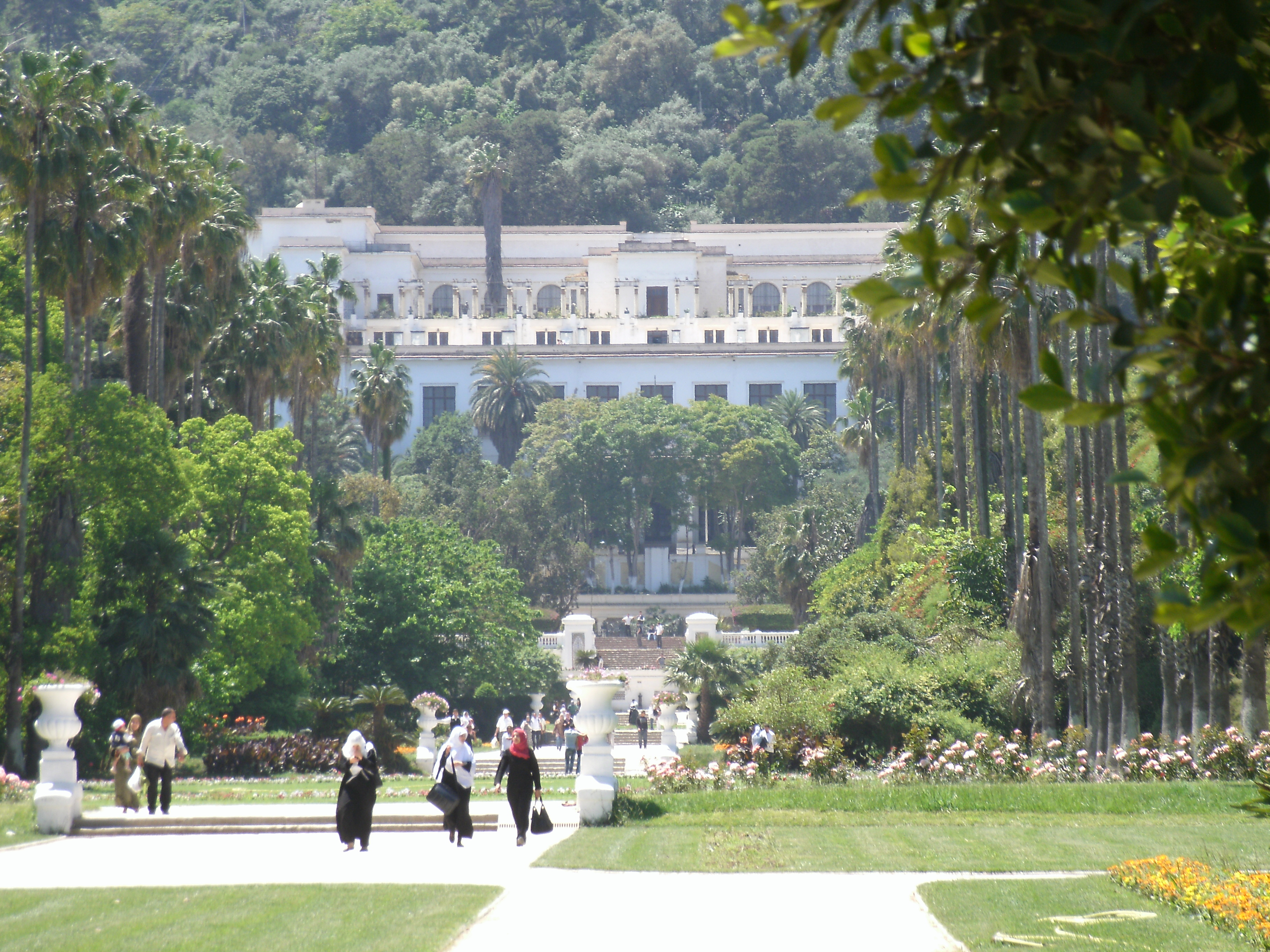
Algeria: The National Museum of Fine Arts of Algiers

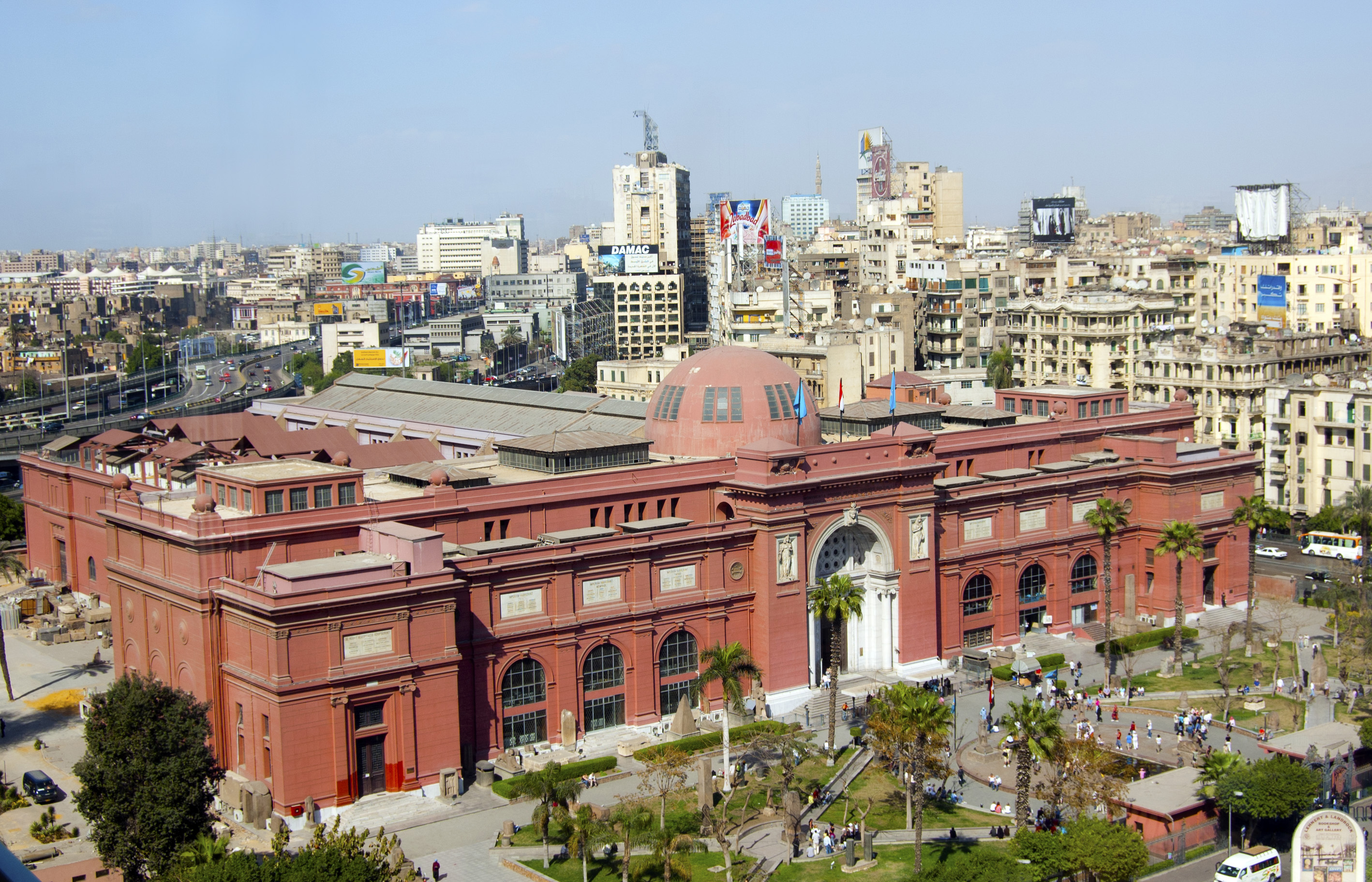
Egypt: The Egyptian Museum in Cairo

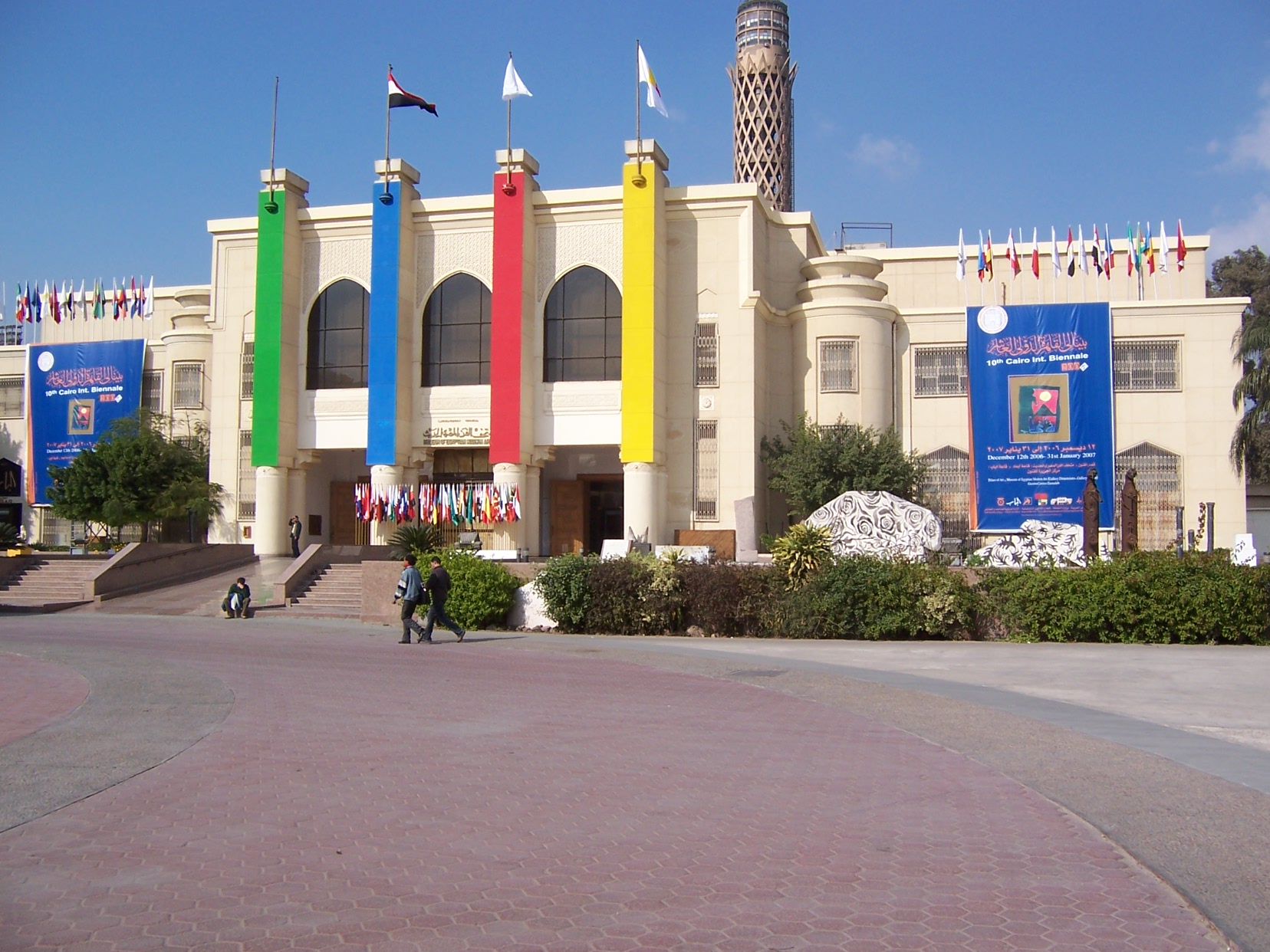
Egypt: Gezira Center for Modern Art in the Gezira district, central Cairo

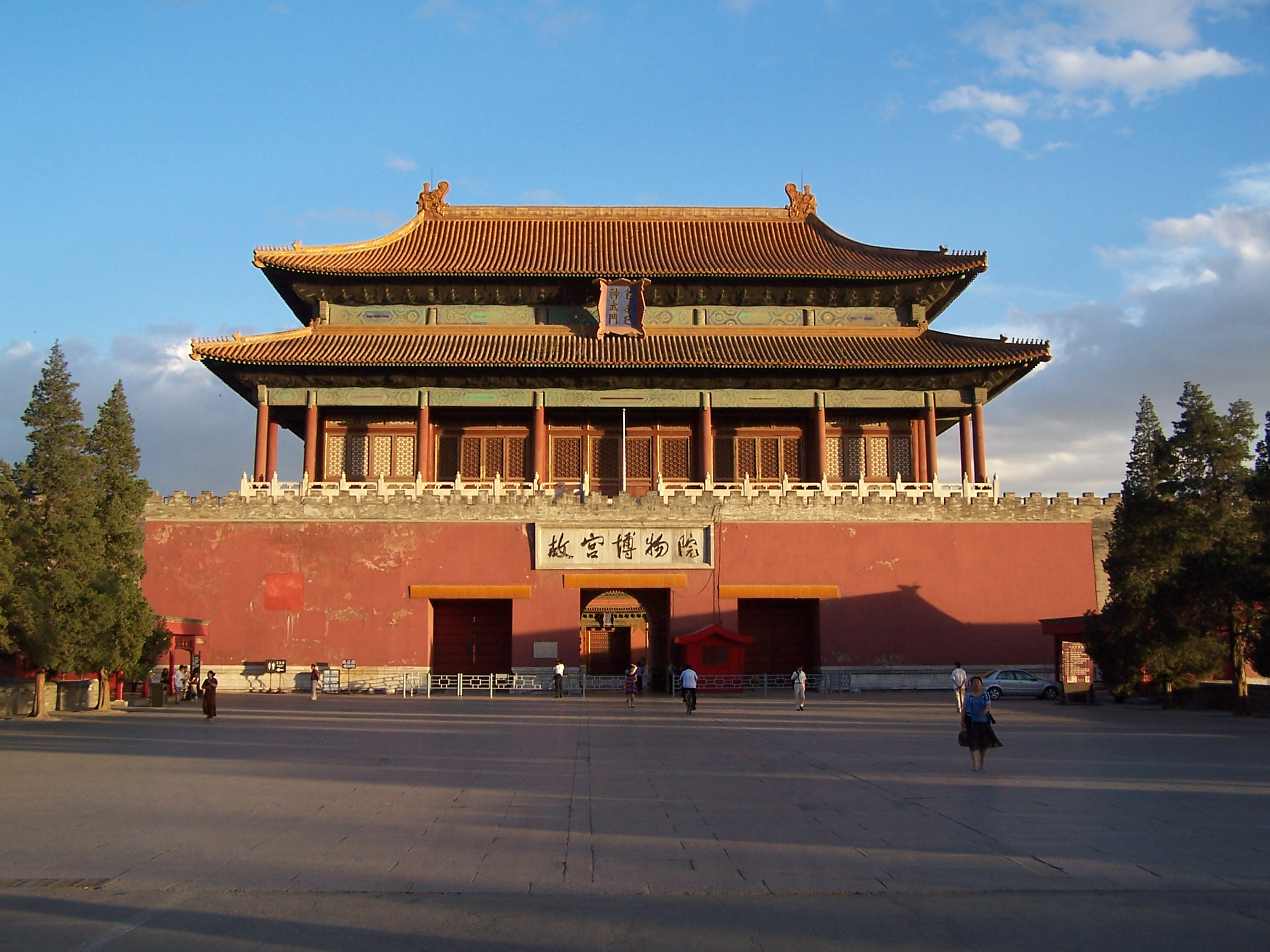
China: The Gate of Divine Might, the northern gate. The lower tablet reads "The Palace Museum" (故宫博物院) in Beijing

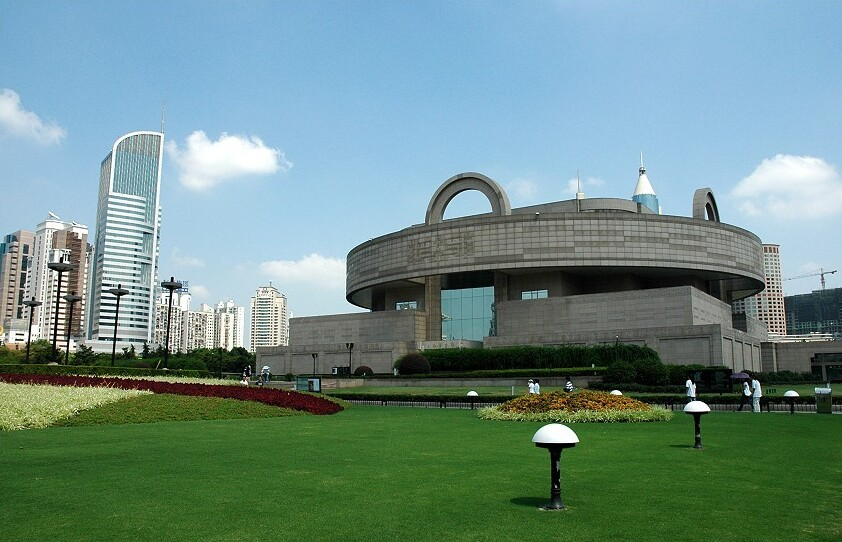
China: The Shanghai Museum

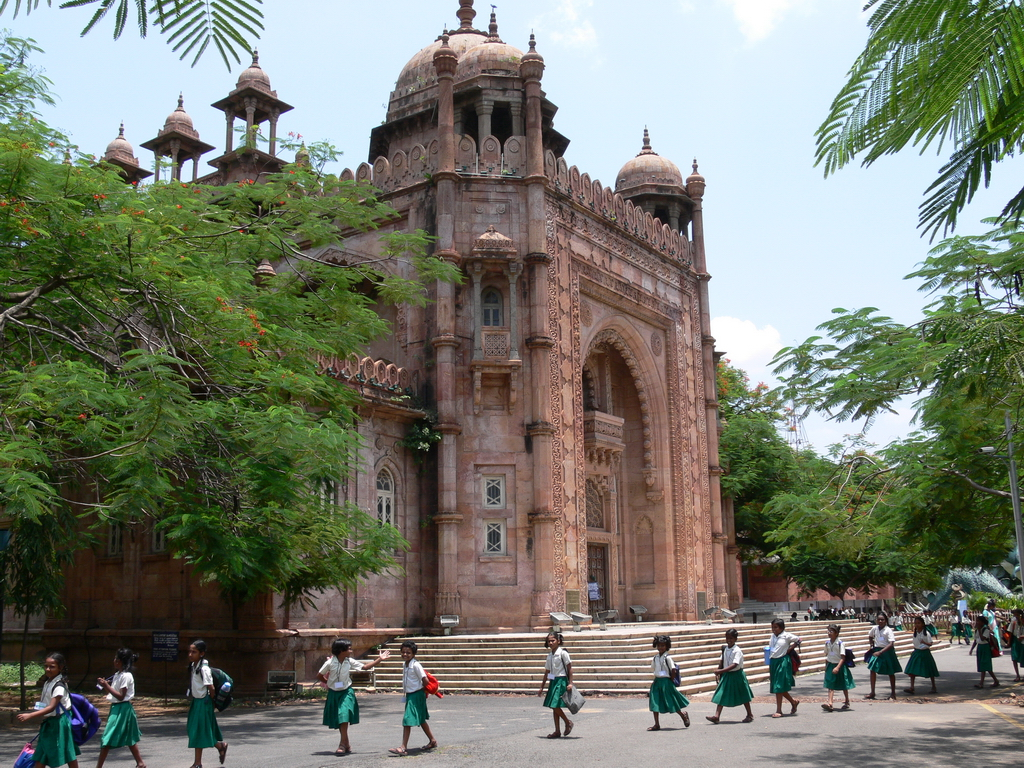
India: The National Art Gallery in Chennai, India

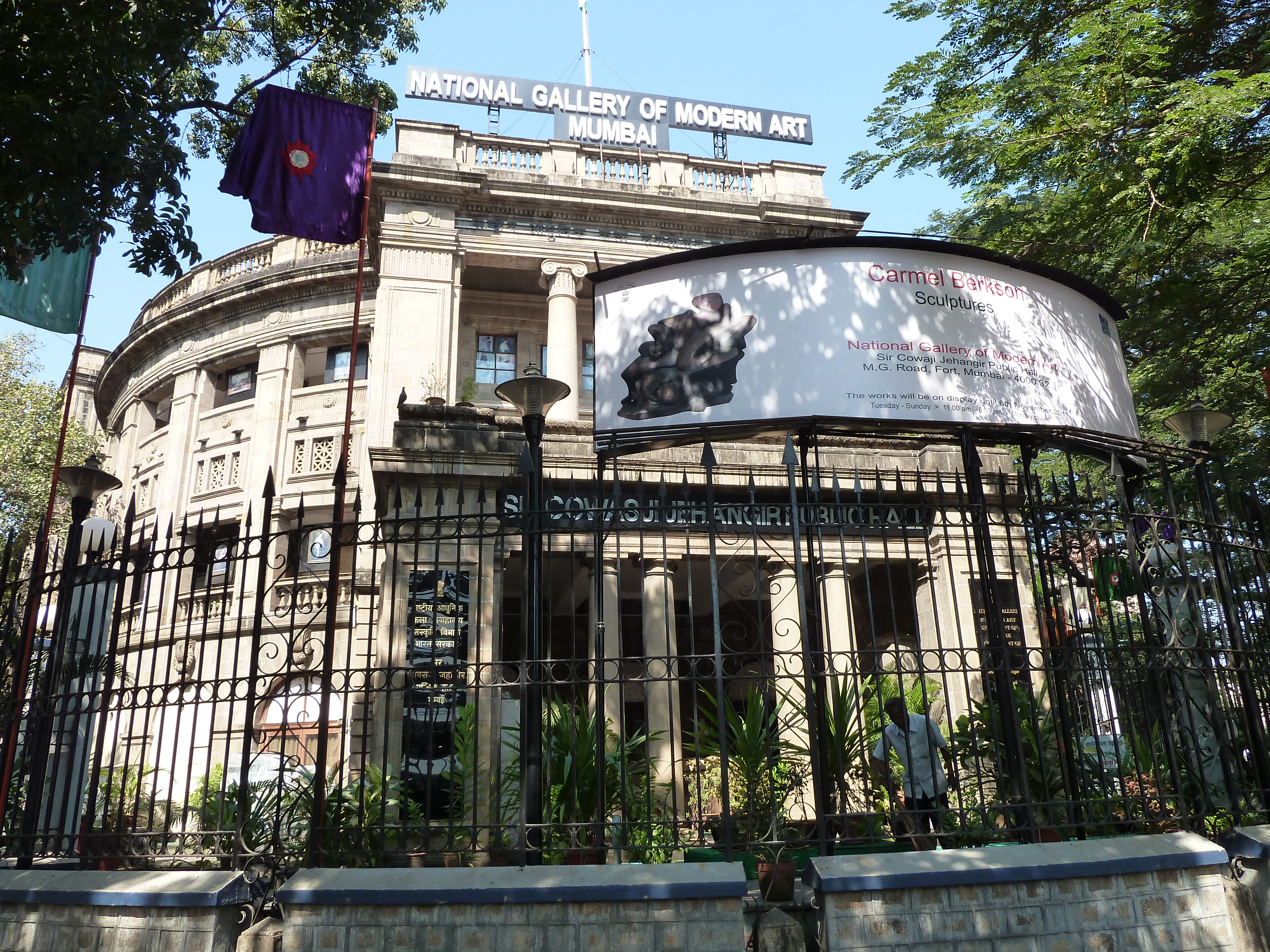
India: The National Gallery of Modern Art in Mumbai

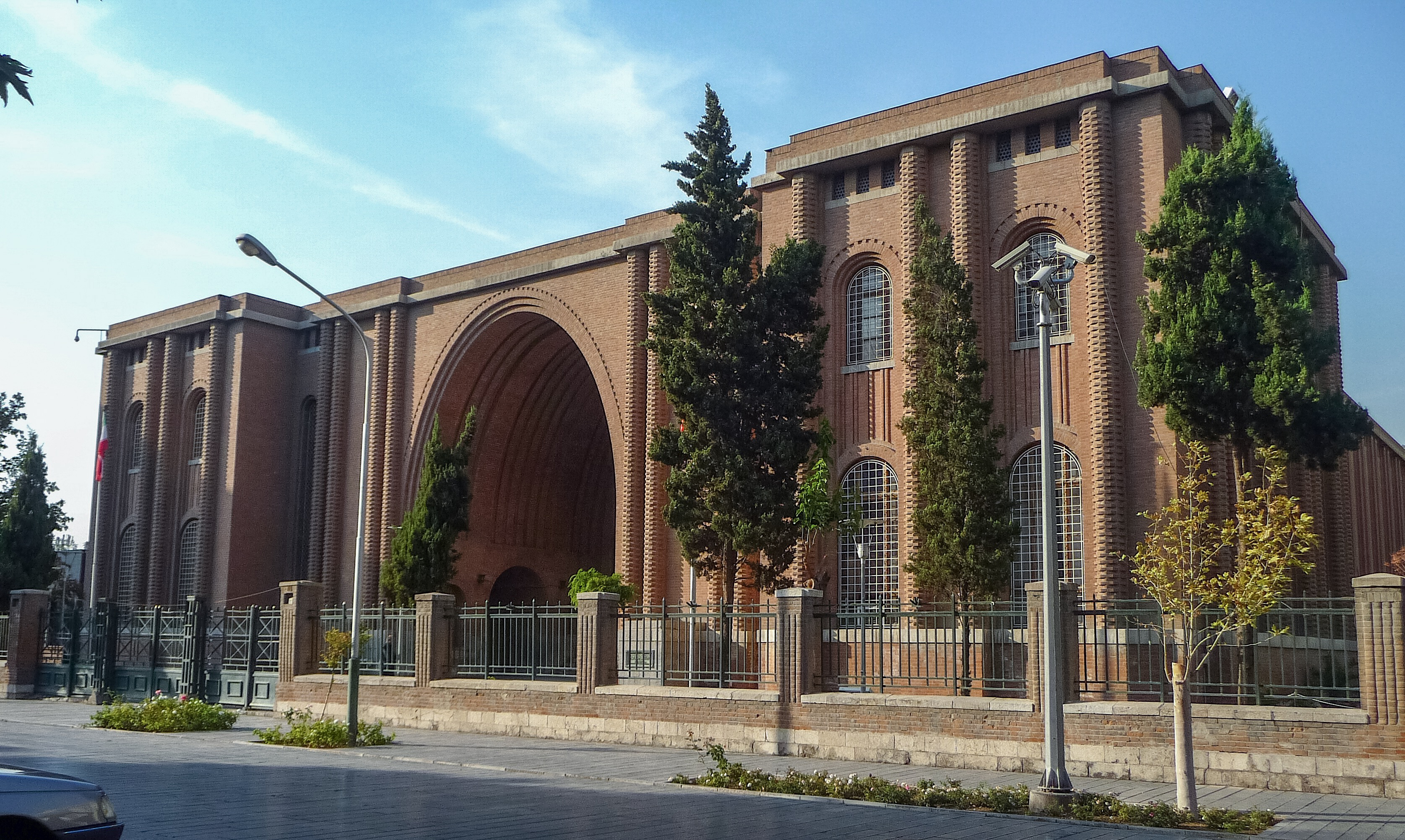
Iran: The National Museum of Iran in Tehran

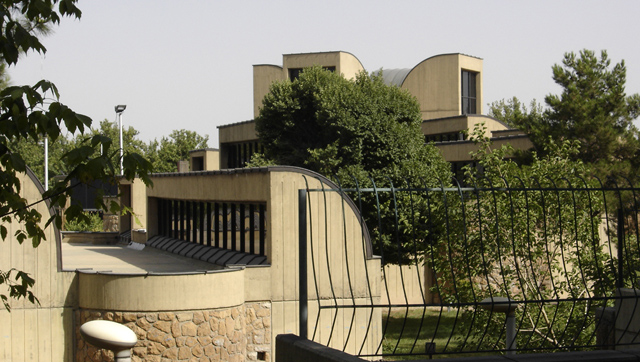
Iran: The Tehran Museum of Contemporary Art in Tehran

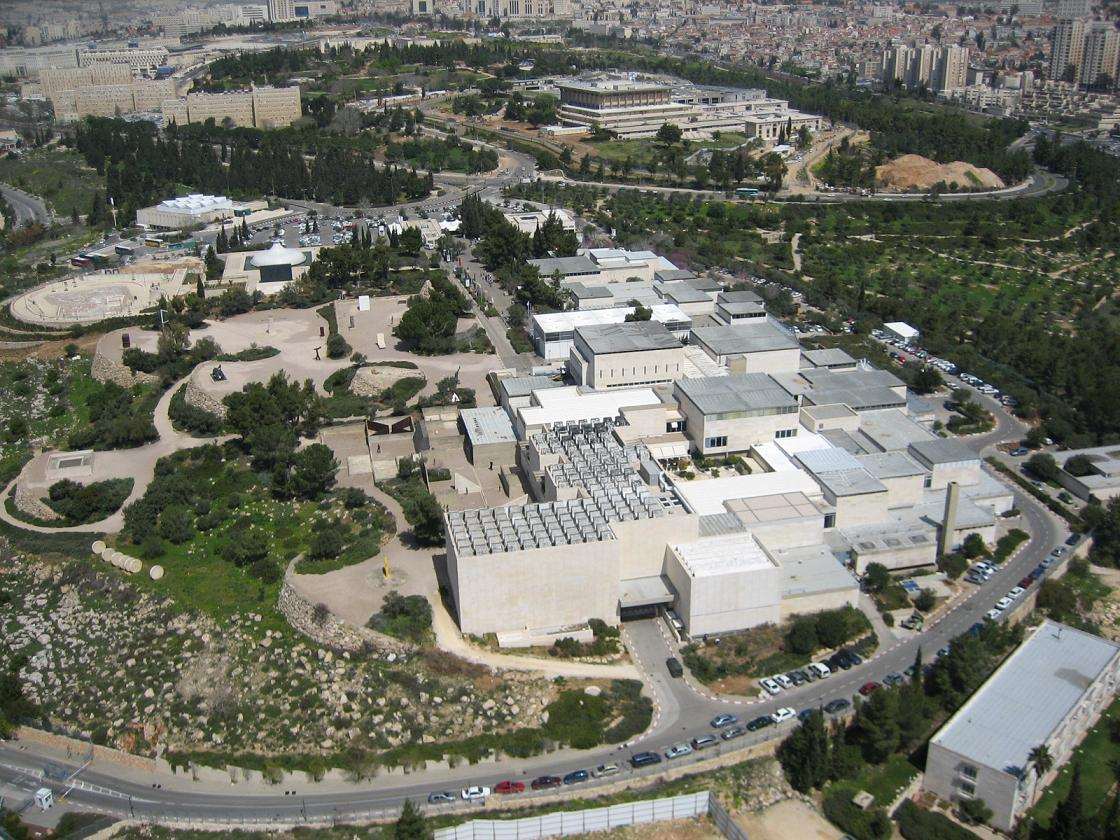
Israel: The Israel Museum in Jerusalem

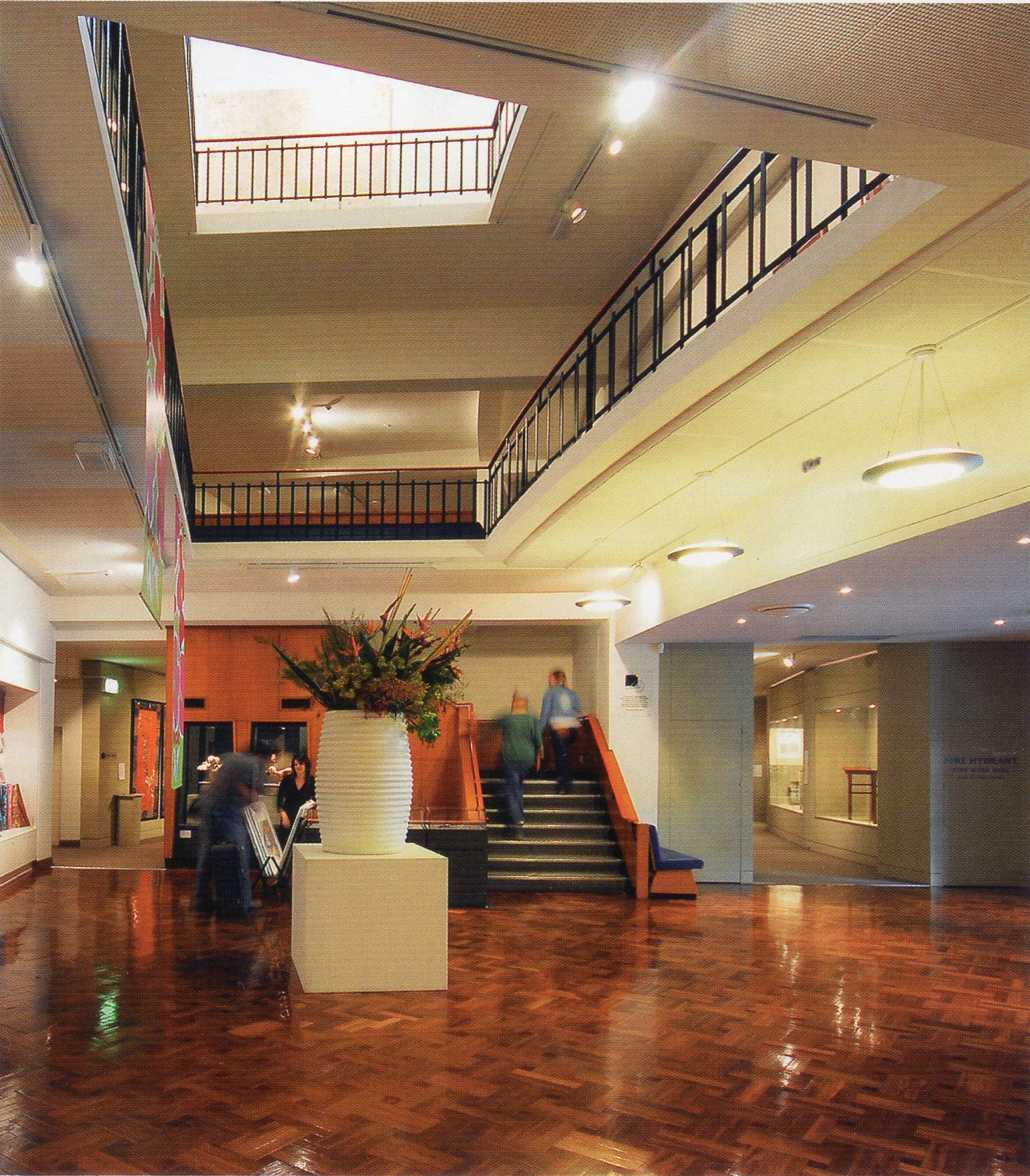
Wollongong City Gallery in Wollongong, New South Wales, Australia.

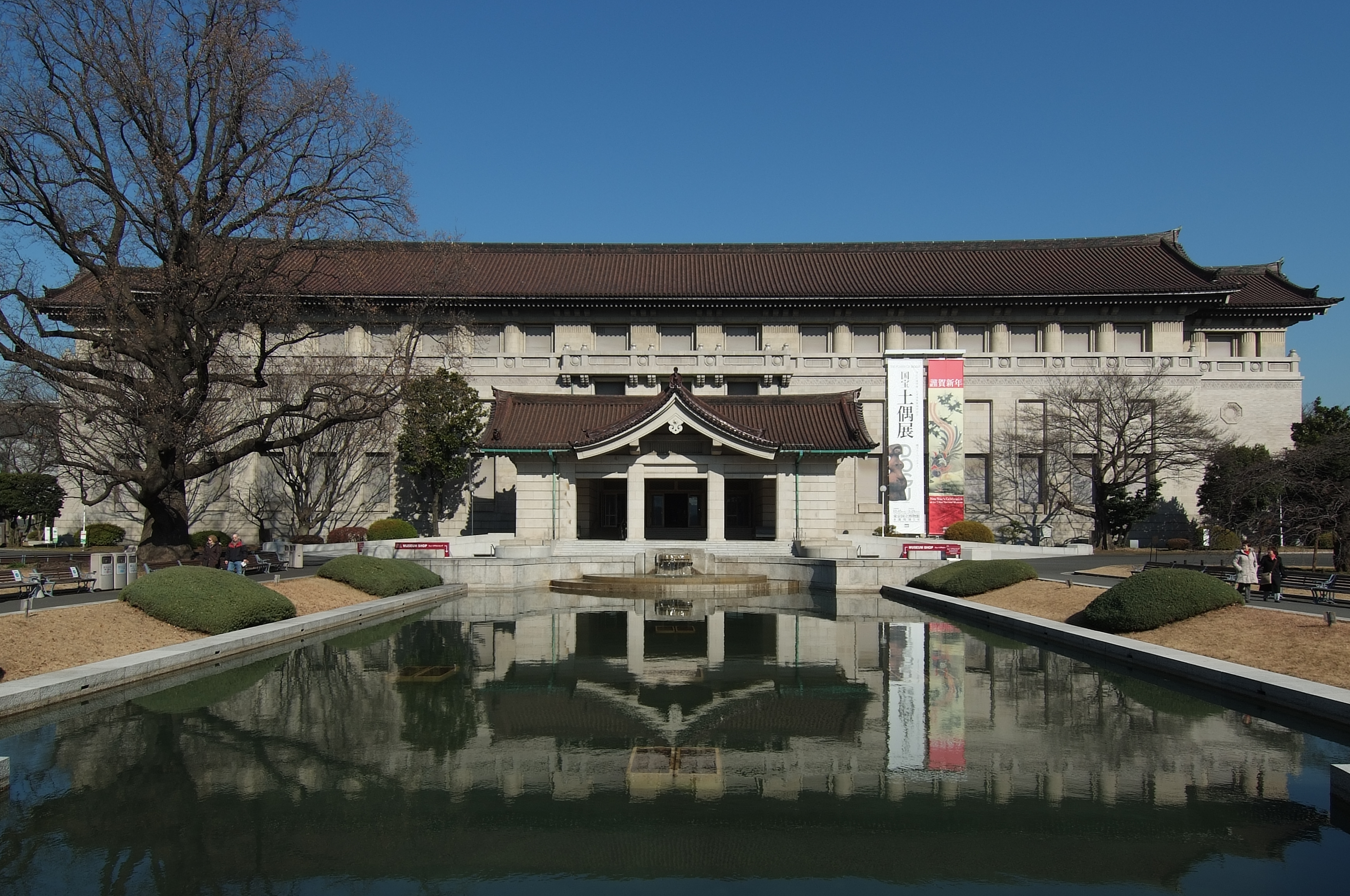
Japan: The Tokyo National Museum in Tokyo

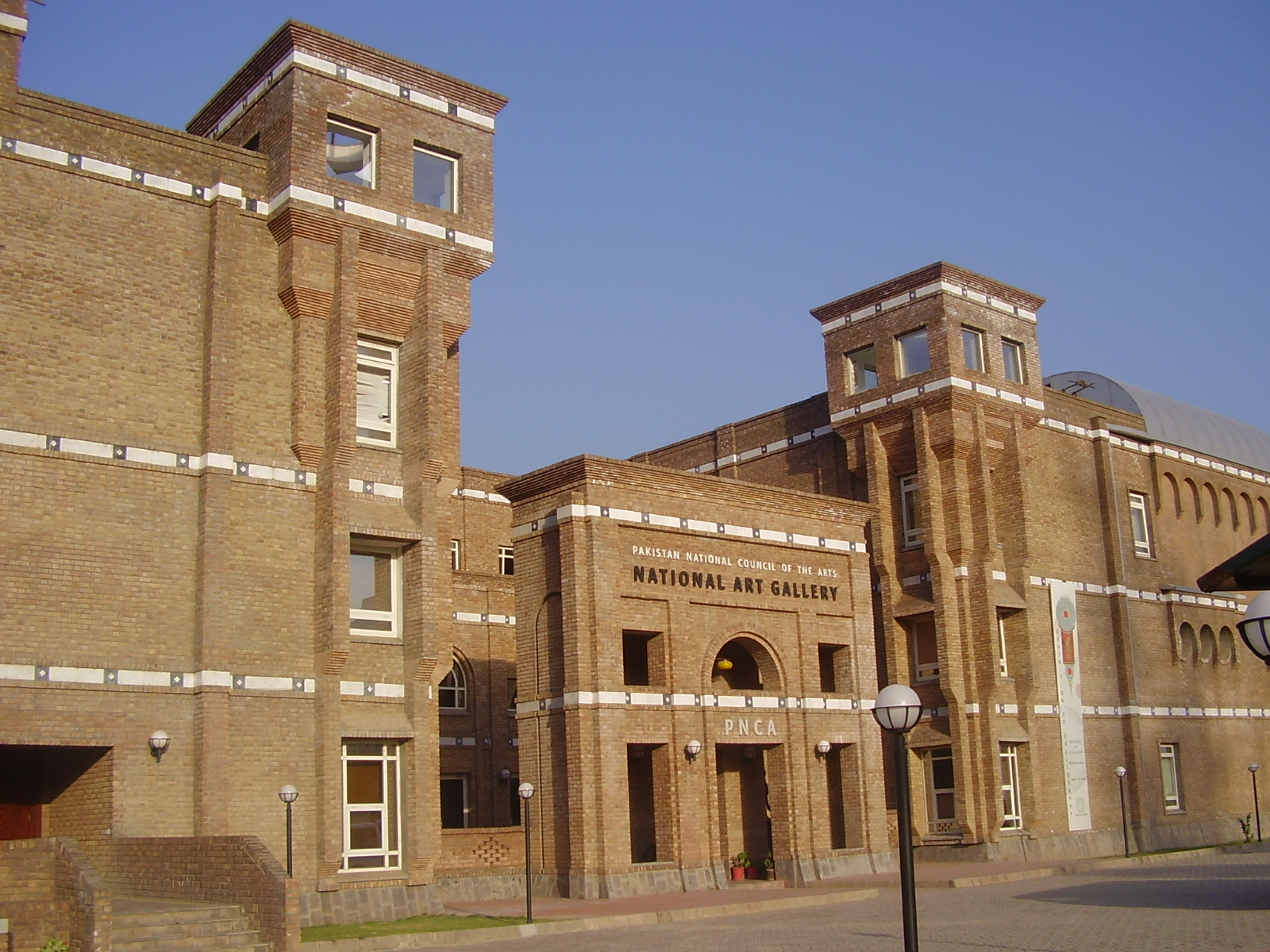
Pakistan: The National Art Gallery in Islamabad

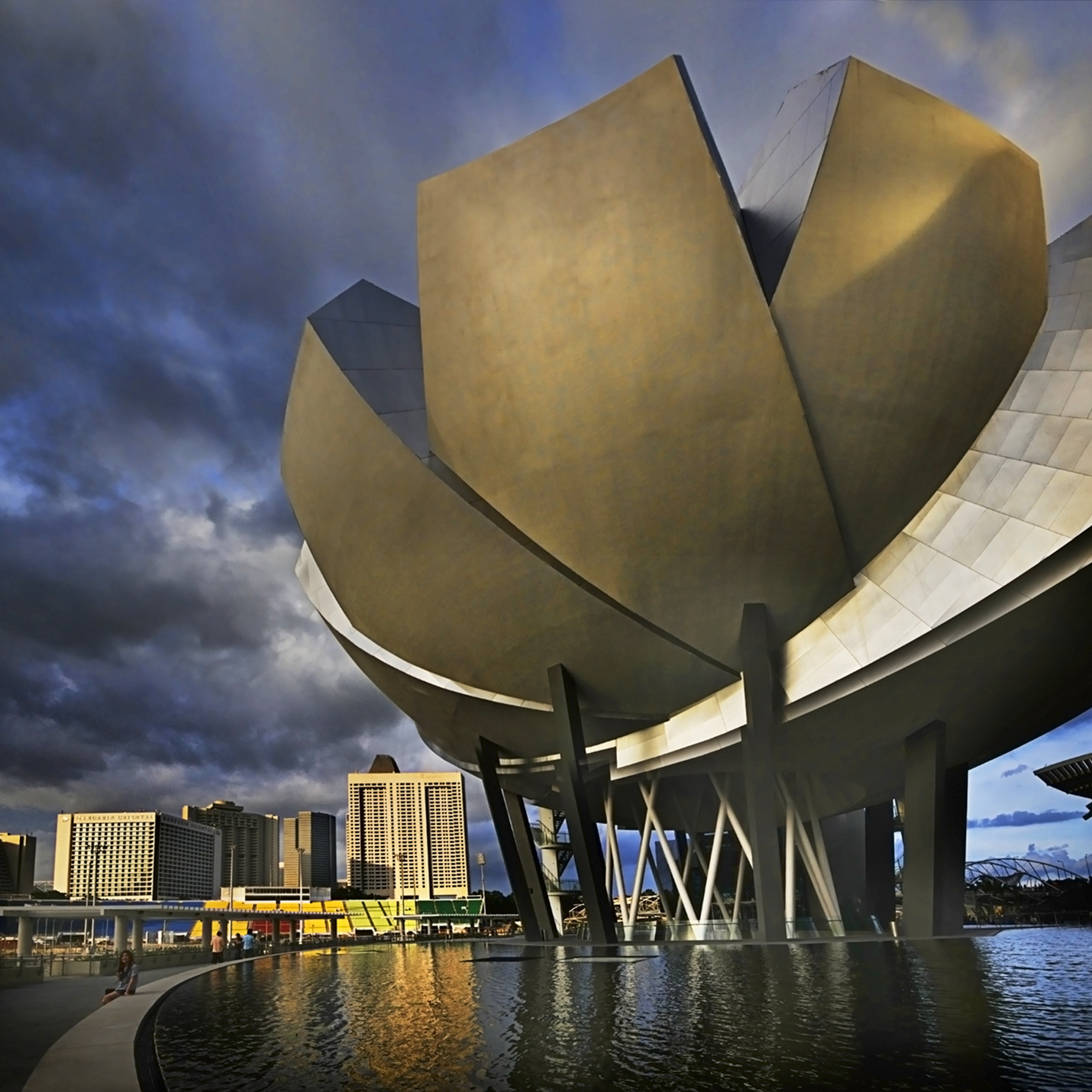
Singapore: The ArtScience Museum

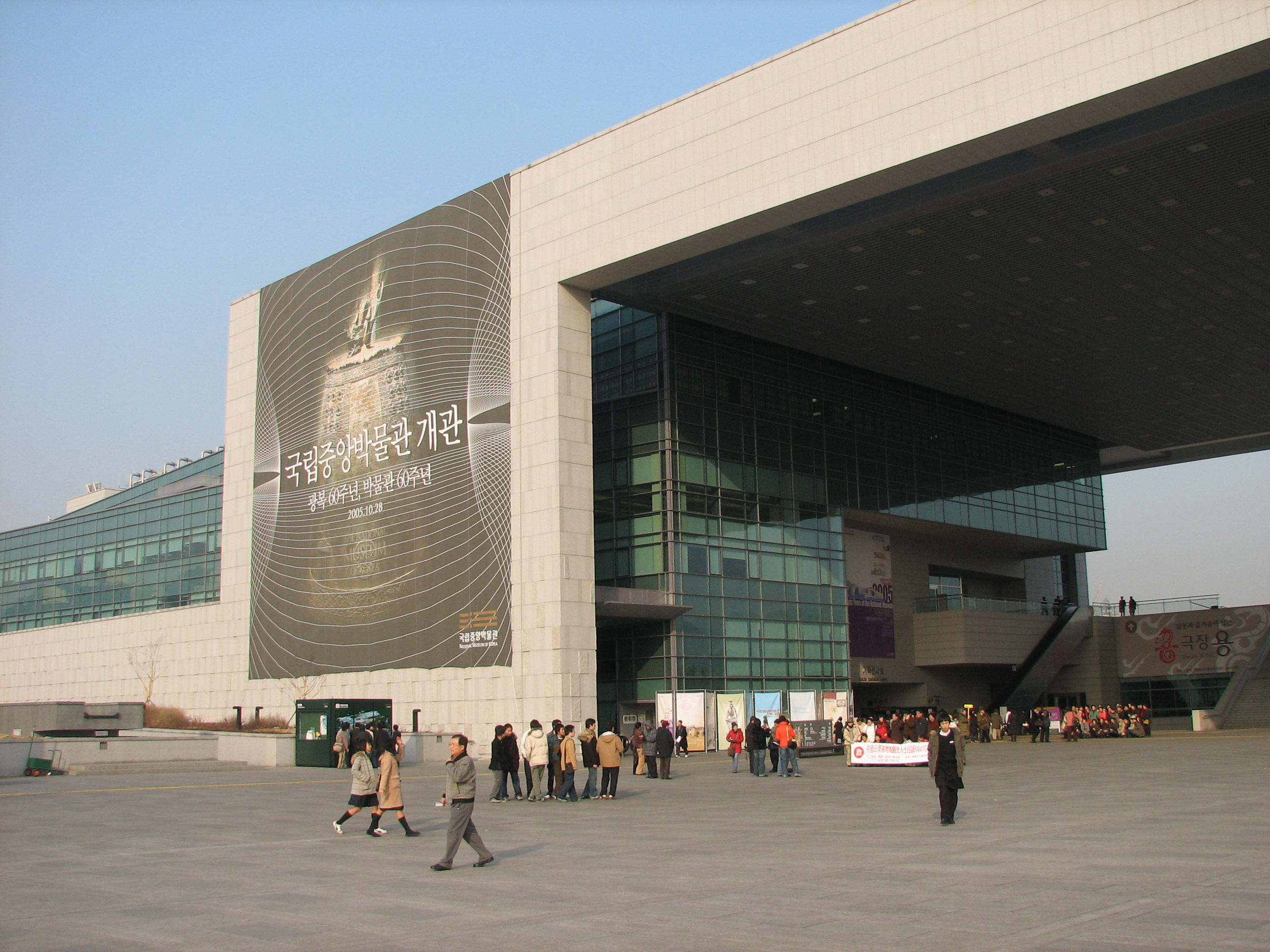
South Korea: The National Museum of Korea in Seoul

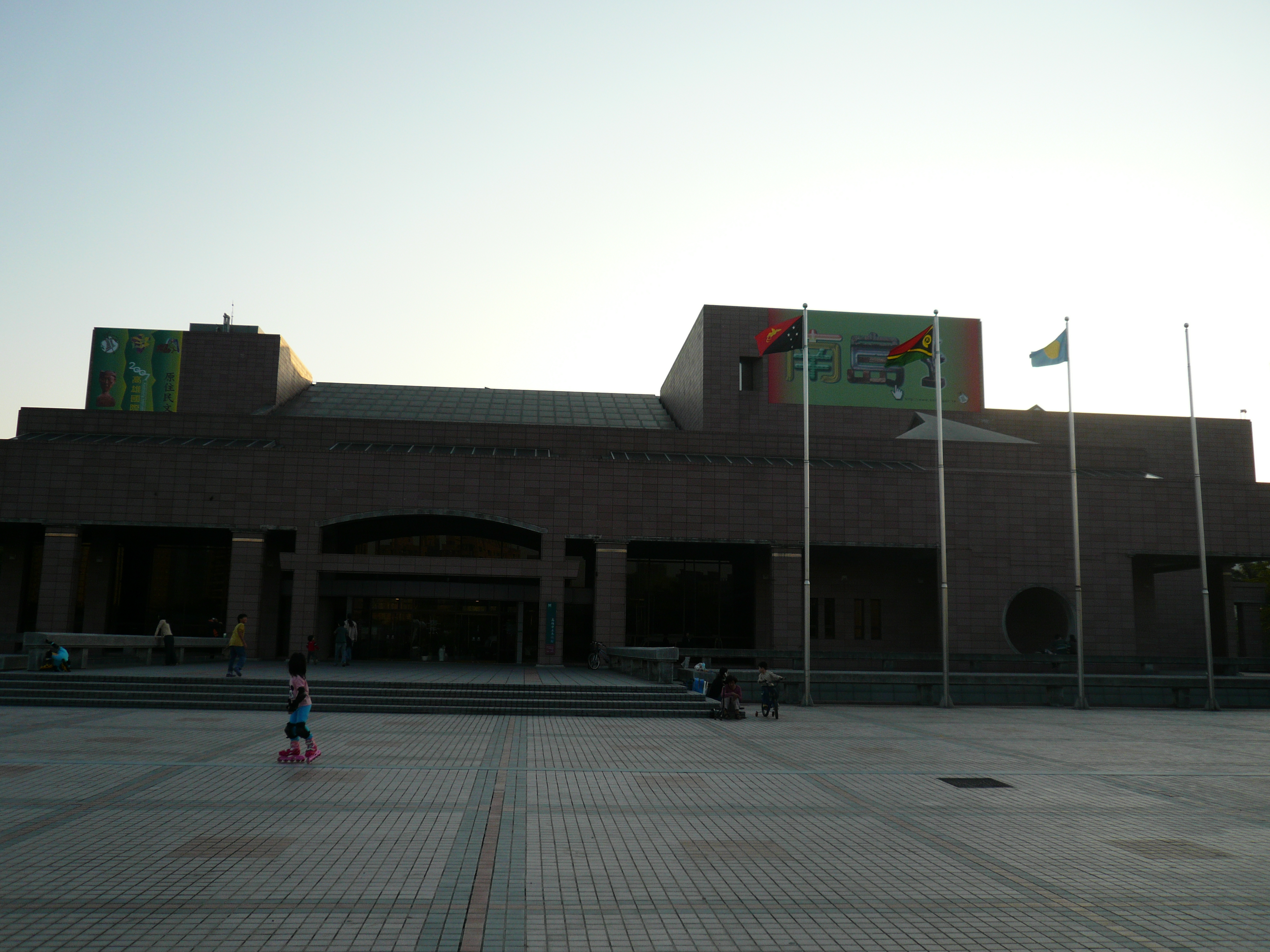
Taiwan: The Kaohsiung Museum of Fine Arts in Taiwan

=== Algeria ===
- Algiers: Museum of Modern Art of Algiers, Museum of Popular Arts and Traditions, National Museum of Fine Arts of Algiers
- Oran: Ahmed Zabana National Museum

=== Egypt ===
- Cairo: Egyptian Museum, Museum of Islamic Art, Gezira Center for Modern Art, Museum of Islamic Ceramics, Prince Amr Ibrahim Palace, The Townhouse Gallery, Mohamed Mahmoud Khalil Museum, Darb 1718
- Port Said: Museum of Modern Art in Egypt

=== Ivory Coast ===
- Abidjan: Musée Municipal d'Art Contemporain de Cocody

=== Madagascar ===
- Antananarivo: University of Madagascar's Museum of Art and Archaeology

=== Morocco ===
- Tangier: Museum of Contemporary Art (Tangier), Musée de Carmen-Macein, Dar el Makhzen (Tangier)

=== Namibia ===
- Windhoek: National Art Gallery of Namibia

=== Nigeria ===
- Lagos: Nigerian National Museum
- Lagos: National Gallery of Modern Art
- Oshogbo: Uli Beier Museum

=== Rwanda ===
- Nyanza: Rwesero Art Museum

=== Senegal ===
- Dakar: IFAN Museum of African Arts

=== South Africa ===
- Cape Town: South African National Gallery
- Johannesburg: MuseuMAfricA, Johannesburg Art Gallery, No Show Museum
- Kimberley: William Humphreys Art Gallery
- Nieu-Bethesda: The Owl House
- Port Elizabeth: Nelson Mandela Metropolitan Art Museum
- Pretoria: Pretoria Art Museum, Edoardo Villa Museum, Van Tilburg Collection, Van Wouw Museum

=== Tunisia ===
- Kairouan: Raqqada

=== Zimbabwe ===
- Harare: National Gallery of Zimbabwe

== Asia ==
=== Bangladesh ===
- Dhaka: Zainul Gallery, National Art Gallery (Bangladesh)

=== China ===
- Beijing: Palace Museum, Guanfu Museum, National Art Museum of China, Today Art Museum, Beijing Art Museum, Beijing World Art Museum, Pékin Fine Arts, Capital Museum
- Hangzhou: Zhejiang Provincial Museum
- Nanjing: Nanjing 4Cube Museum of Contemporary Art, Jiangsu Provincial Art Museum
- Shanghai: Shanghai Museum, Shanghai Art Museum, Museum of Contemporary Art Shanghai, Rockbund Art Museum, Long Museum, China Art Museum, Power Station of Art
- Suzhou: Suzhou Museum
- Zhengzhou: Henan Museum

==== Hong Kong ====
- City of Victoria: University Museum and Art Gallery, Hong Kong Visual Arts Centre, Tsui Museum of Art
- Kowloon: Hong Kong Museum of Art, M+

=== India ===
- Ahmedabad: Lalbhai Dalpatbhai Museum, Sanskar Kendra
- Allahabad: Allahabad Museum
- Bangalore: National Gallery of Modern Art, Bangalore
- Bangalore: Museum of Art & Photography (MAP)
- Bhopal: Bharat Bhavan
- Bhubaneswar: Odisha State Museum
- Chandigarh: Government Museum and Art Gallery, Chandigarh
- Chennai: Government Museum, Chennai, The National Art Gallery (Chennai)
- Hyderabad: Salar Jung Museum
- Jaipur: Albert Hall Museum, Jawahar Kala Kendra
- Kolkata: Asutosh Museum of Indian Art, Indian Museum, Victoria Memorial (India)
- Mumbai: Cowasji Jehangir Hall, Jehangir Art Gallery, National Gallery of Modern Art, Mumbai, Prince of Wales Museum
- New Delhi: National Gallery of Modern Art, National Museum, Sanskriti Museums, Triveni Kala Sangam
- Panjim: Goa State Museum
- Patna: Patna Museum, Jalan Museum, Bhartiya Nritya Kala Mandir
- Thiruvananthapuram: Sree Chitra Art Gallery, Napier Museum
- Vadodara: Baroda Museum & Picture Gallery, Maharaja Fateh Singh Museum

=== Indonesia ===
- Jakarta: National Museum of Indonesia, Fine Art and Ceramic Museum, National Gallery of Indonesia

=== Iran ===
- Tehran: National Museum of Iran, Tehran Museum of Contemporary Art, Carpet Museum of Iran

=== Iraq ===
- Baghdad: National Museum of Iraq

=== Israel ===
- Haifa: Haifa Museum of Art, Hecht Museum, Janco Dada Museum, Mane-Katx Museum, Tikotin Museum of Japanese Art
- Jerusalem: Bible Lands Museum, Israel Museum, Jerusalem Artists House, L. A. Mayer Institute for Islamic Art, Rockefeller Museum
- Tel Aviv: Bauhaus Center, Tel Aviv Museum of Art, Design Museum Holon

=== Japan ===
- Atami: MOA Museum of Art
- Kanazawa: 21st Century Museum of Contemporary Art
- Kyoto: Kyoto National Museum, Kyoto Municipal Museum of Art, National Museum of Modern Art Kyoto, Sen-oku Hakuko Kan, Miho Museum
- Matsumoto: Japan Ukiyo-e Museum
- Nara: Nara National Museum
- Naruto: Ōtsuka Museum of Art
- Osaka: Osaka National Museum of Art
- Tokyo: Bridgestone Museum of Art, Hatakeyama Memorial Museum of Fine Art Idemitsu Museum of Arts, Koishikawa Ukiyo-e Art Museum, Mitsui Memorial Museum, Mitsubishi Ichigokan Museum, Mori Art Museum, Museum of Contemporary Art Tokyo, Museum of the Imperial Collections, National Art Center, National Museum of Modern Art, Tokyo, National Museum of Western Art, New Otani Art Museum, Nezu Museum, Ota Memorial Museum of Art, Setagaya Art Museum, Suntory Museum of Art, Tokyo Metropolitan Art Museum, Tokyo National Museum, Tokyo Fuji Art Museum, Watari Museum of Contemporary Art

=== Jordan ===
- Amman: Jordan National Gallery of Fine Arts

=== Lebanon ===
- Beirut: Sursock Museum

=== Malaysia ===
- Kuala Lumpur: Islamic Arts Museum Malaysia, National Visual Arts Gallery (Malaysia), Petronas Gallery

=== Mongolia ===
- Ulaanbaatar: Mongolian National Modern Art Gallery

=== Nepal ===
- Kathmandu: Patan Museum, Children's Art Museum of Nepal

=== North Korea ===
- Pyongyang: Korean Art Gallery

=== Pakistan ===
- Islamabad: National Art Gallery

=== Philippines ===
- Manila: National Museum of Fine Arts

=== Singapore ===
- Singapore: 8Q SAM, Singapore Art Museum, National Museum of Singapore, National Gallery Singapore, NUS Museum, ArtScience Museum, Nei Xue Tang Museum, Singapore City Gallery

=== South Korea ===
- Daejeon: Daejeon Museum of Art
- Gwacheon: Jebiwool Art Museum, National Museum of Contemporary Art (South Korea)
- Seoul: National Museum of Korea, Bukchon Art Museum, Hanwon Museum of Art, Kumho Museum of Art, Leeum, Samsung Museum of Art, Milal Museum of Art, Posco Art Museum, Total Museum of Contemporary Art, Seoul Museum of Art, Seoul National University Museum of Art, Seonbawi Museum of Art, Sungkok Art Museum, Artsonje Center, Horim Museum, Hwajeong Museum, Ilmin Museum of Art, Museum of Korean Buddhist Art, Whanki Museum, SOMA Museum of Art, Savina Museum, Rodin Gallery
- Yongin: Ho-am Art Museum, Nam June Paik Art Center

=== Syria ===
- Aleppo: National Museum of Aleppo
- Damascus: National Museum of Damascus

=== Taiwan ===
- Changhua: Changhua Arts Museum, Changhua County Art Museum, Lukang Folk Arts Museum
- Chiayi City: Chiayi Art Museum
- Chiayi County: Mei-Ling Fine Arts Museum
- Kaohsiung: Kaohsiung Museum of Fine Arts
- Keelung: YM Oceanic Culture and Art Museum
- Nantou: Yu-hsiu Museum of Art
- Pingtung: Pingtung Art Museum
- Taichung: Asia Museum of Modern Art, Fengyuan Museum of Lacquer Art, National Taiwan Museum of Fine Arts, Taichung English and Art Museum
- Tainan: Fangyuan Museum of Arts, Tainan Art Museum
- Taipei: Aurora Art Museum, Children's Art Museum in Taipei, Jut Art Museum, Kuandu Museum of Fine Arts, Lingnan Fine Arts Museum, Museum of Contemporary Art Taipei, Museum of Jade Art, National Palace Museum, Taipei Fine Arts Museum, Tittot Glass Art Museum
- Taitung: Taitung Art Museum
- Taoyuan: Daxi Wood Art Ecomuseum
- Yilan: Yilan Museum of Art

=== Thailand ===
- Bangkok: Bangkok Art and Culture Centre, Bangkok University Gallery, Bangkok National Museum, H Gallery, Jamjuree Art Gallery, Silpakorn University Art Gallery, National Gallery of Thailand, Suan Dusit Art Gallery, Span's Cultural Gallery, Museum of Buddhist Art, Thavibu Gallery

=== Turkmenistan ===
- Ashgabat: Turkmen Museum of Fine Arts, Turkmen Carpet Museum

=== United Arab Emirates ===
- Abu Dhabi: Salwa Zeidan Gallery, Guggenheim Abu Dhabi, Louvre Abu Dhabi, Zayed National Museum
- Al Ain: Sheikh Zayed Palace Museum
- Dubai: Salsali Private Museum, Tashkeel Art Hub,
- Sharjah: Sharjah Art Museum

=== Uzbekistan ===
- Nukus: Nukus Museum of Art

=== Vietnam ===
- Hanoi: Hanoi Contemporary Arts Centre, Vietnam National Museum of Fine Arts
- Huế: Hue Museum of Royal Fine Arts
- Hội An: Precious Heritage Art Gallery Museum
- Ho Chi Minh City: Ho Chi Minh City Museum of Fine Arts

== Europe ==
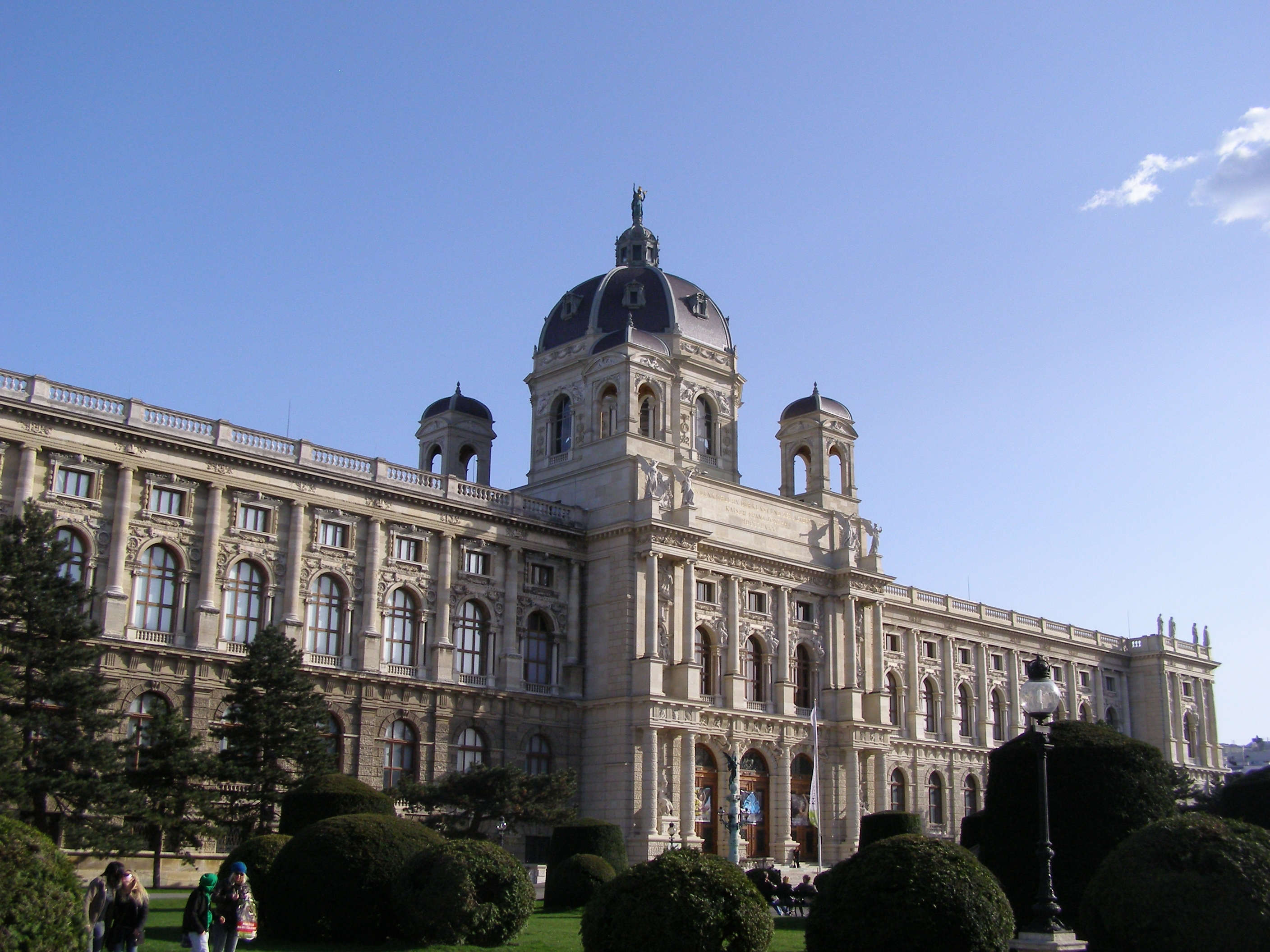
Austria: The Kunsthistorisches Museum in Vienna

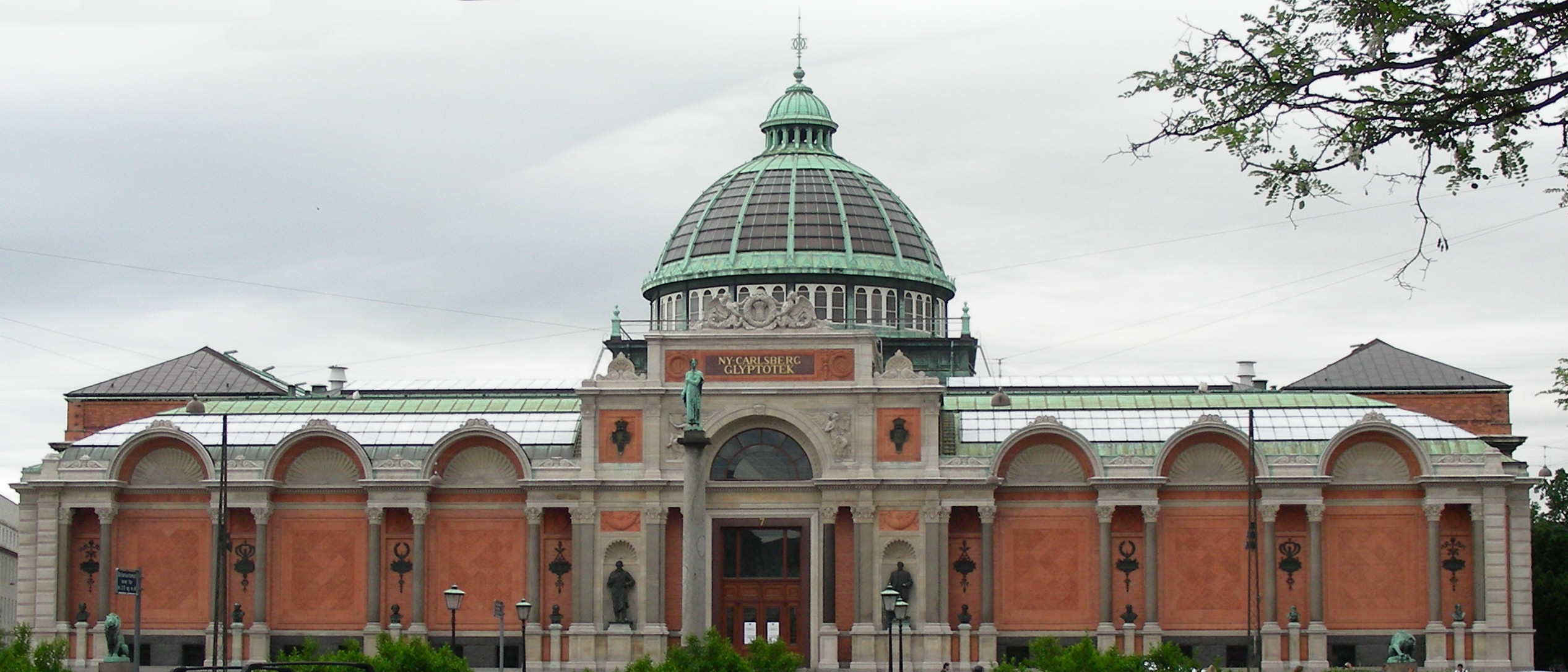
Denmark: The Ny Carlsberg Glyptotek in Copenhagen

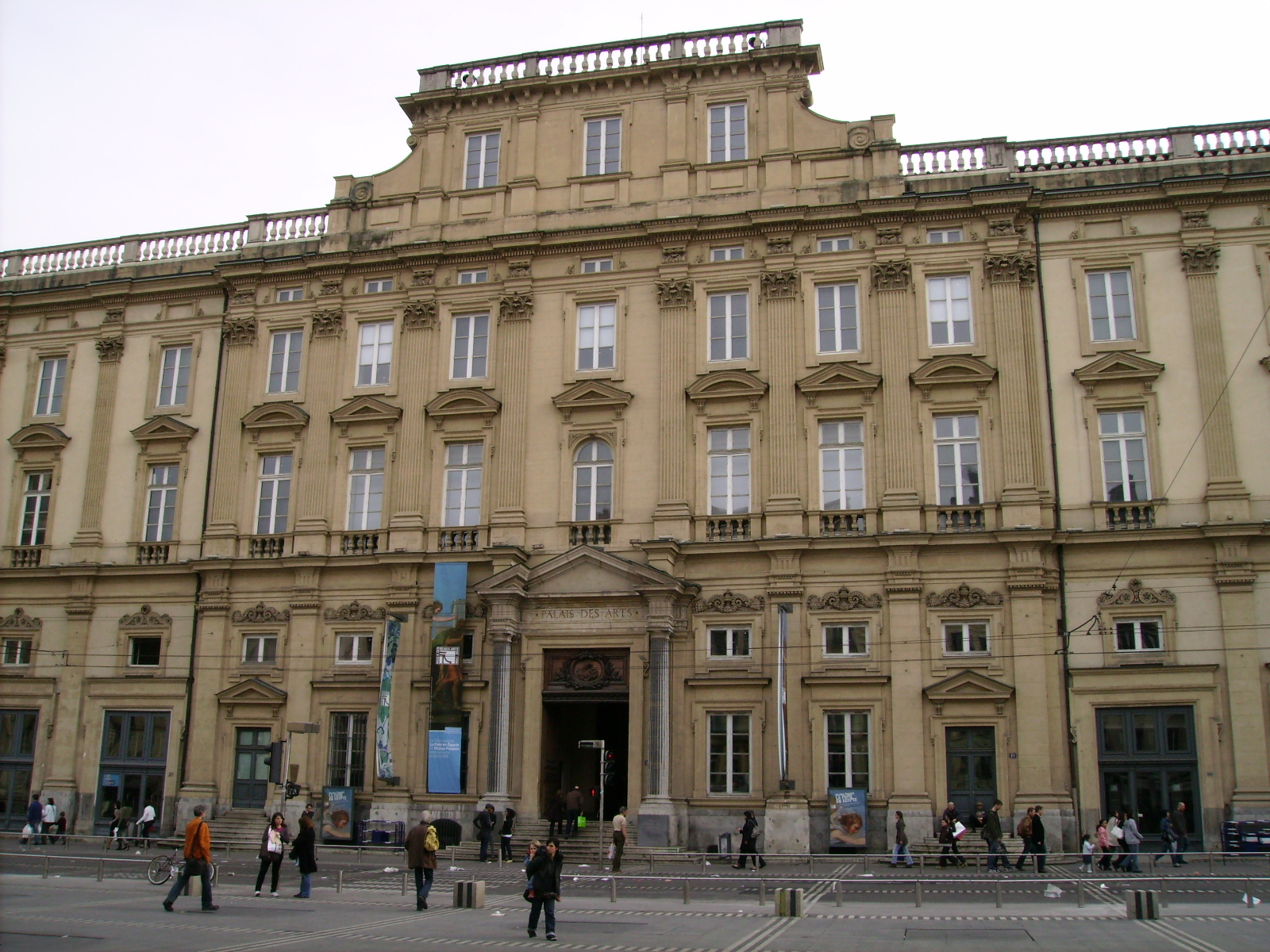
France: The Musée des Beaux-Arts in Lyon

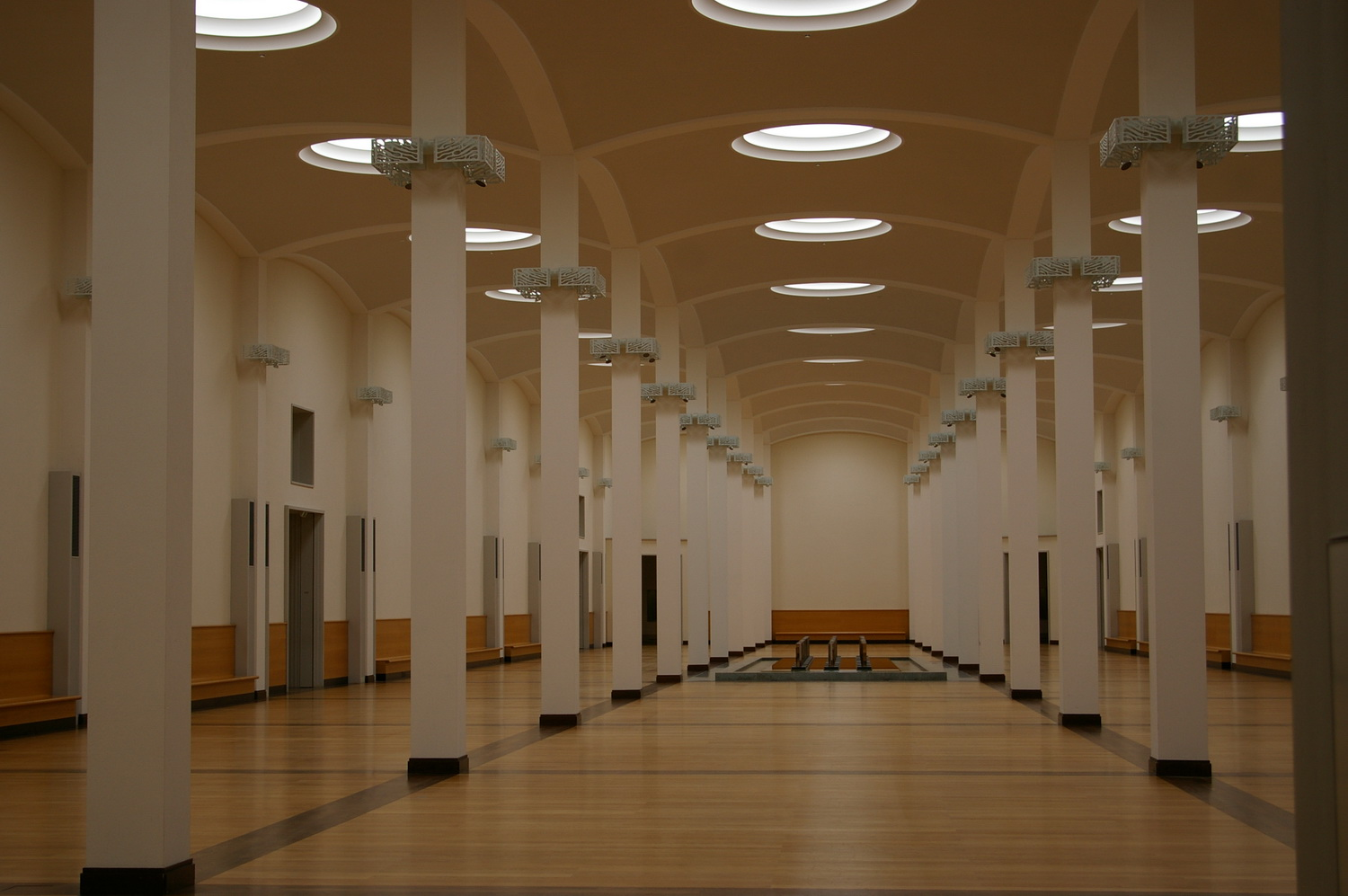
Germany: Grand hall inside the Gemäldegalerie in Berlin

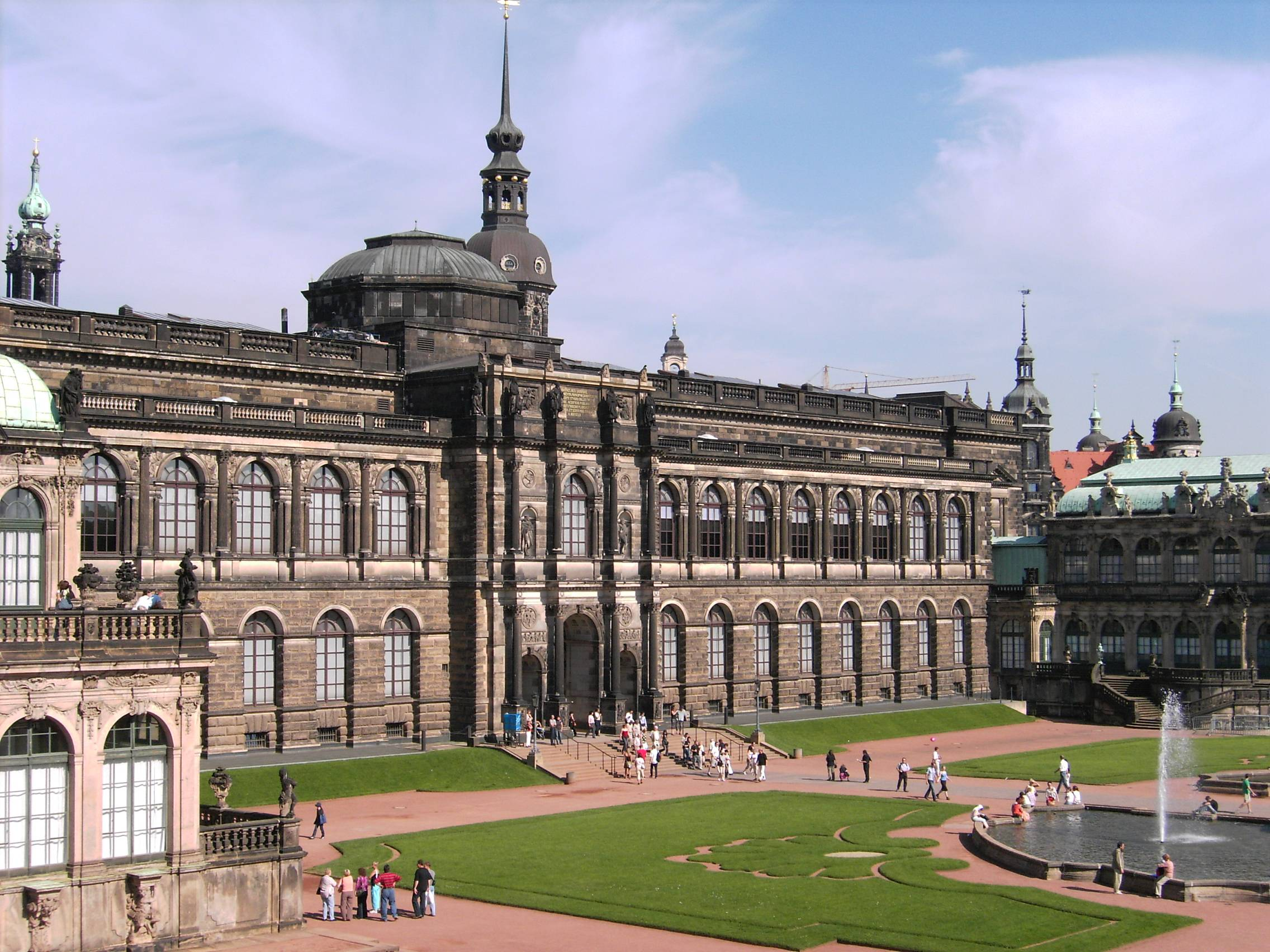
Germany: The Gemäldegalerie Alte Meister in Dresden

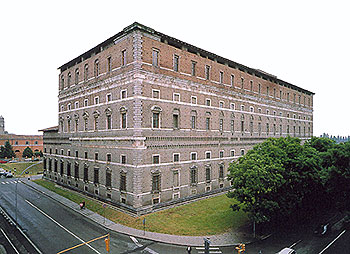
Italy: Palazzo Farnese, Piacenza

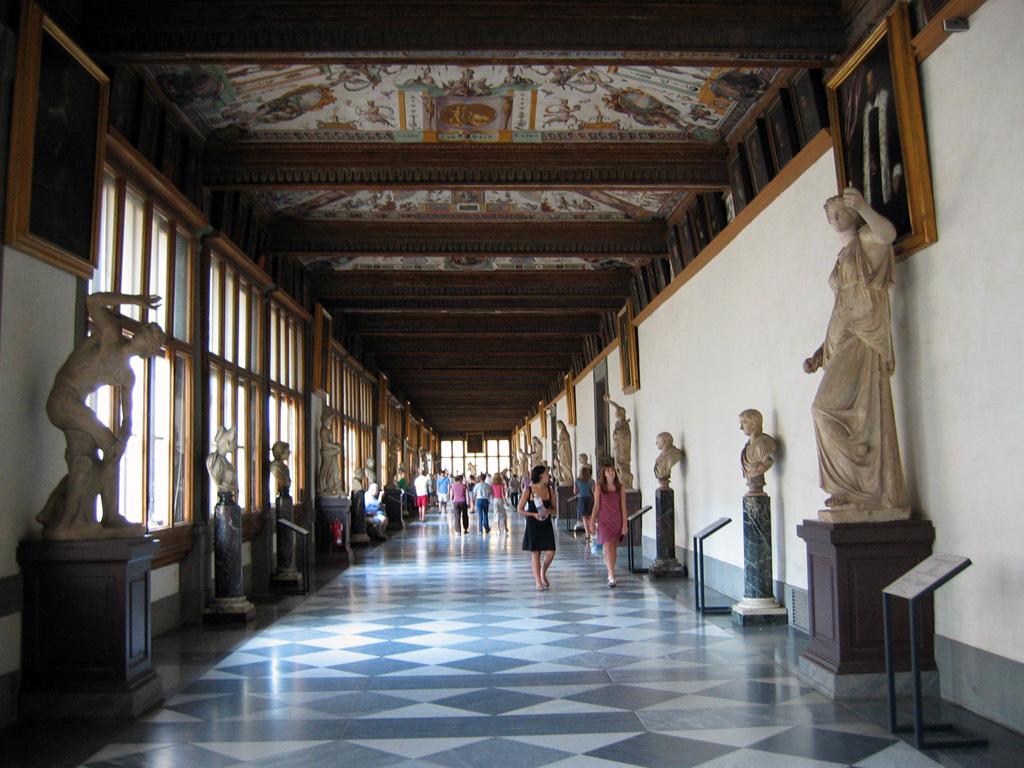
Italy: The Uffizi in Florence

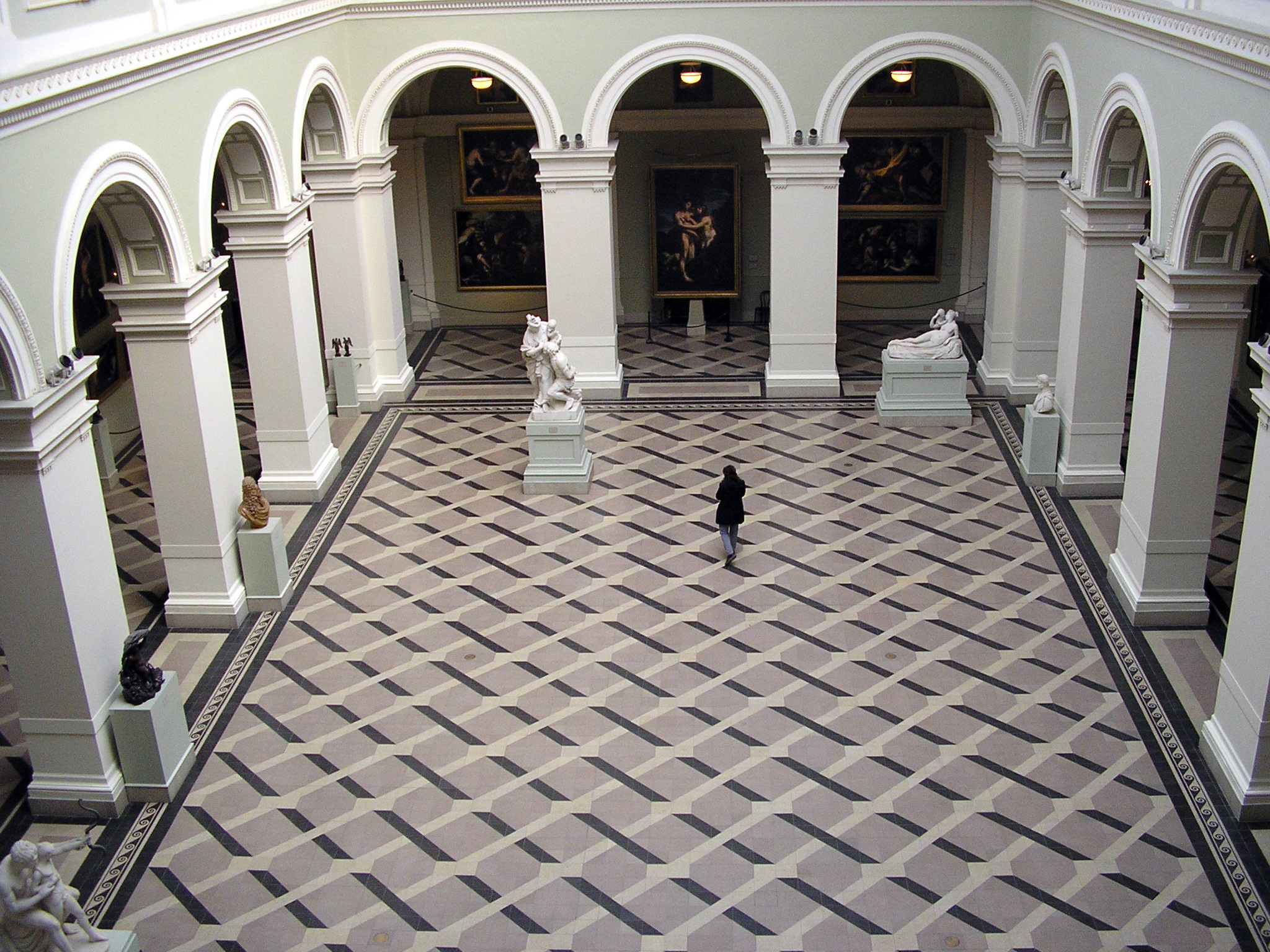
Hungary: Grand hall inside the Museum of Fine Arts in Budapest

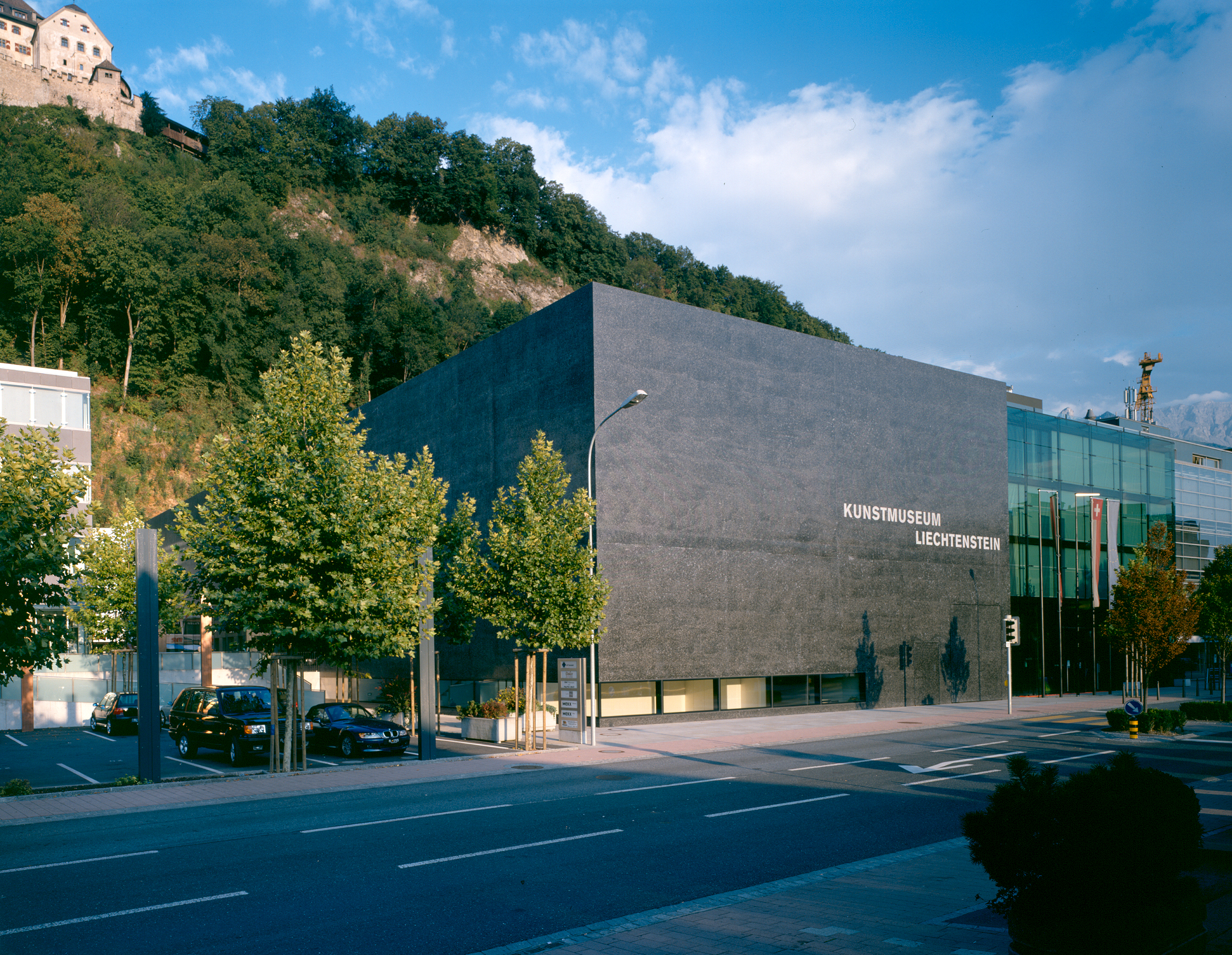
Liechtenstein: Kunstmuseum Liechtenstein (National Galerie of Liechtenstein), Vaduz

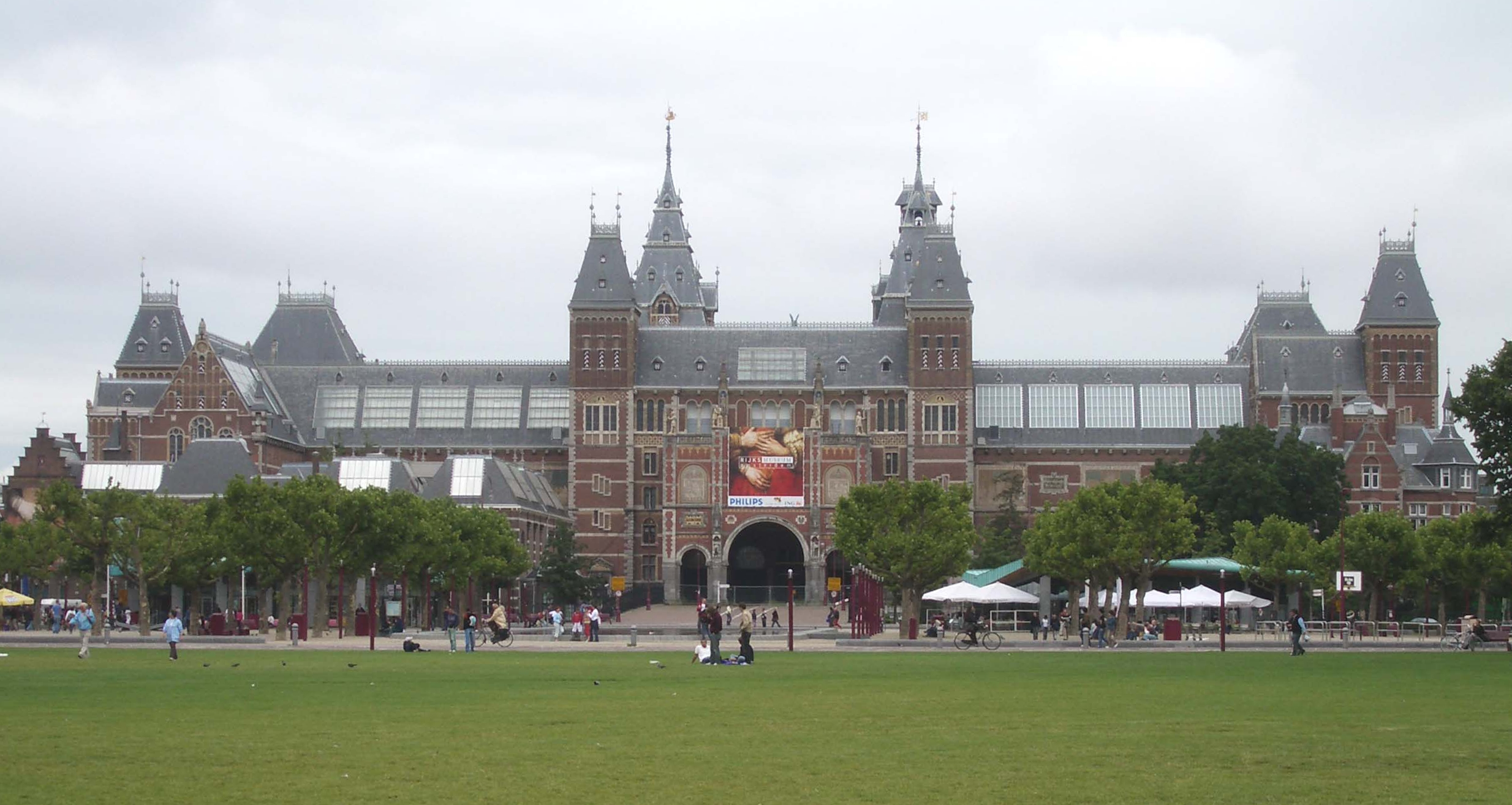
The Netherlands: The Rijksmuseum in Amsterdam

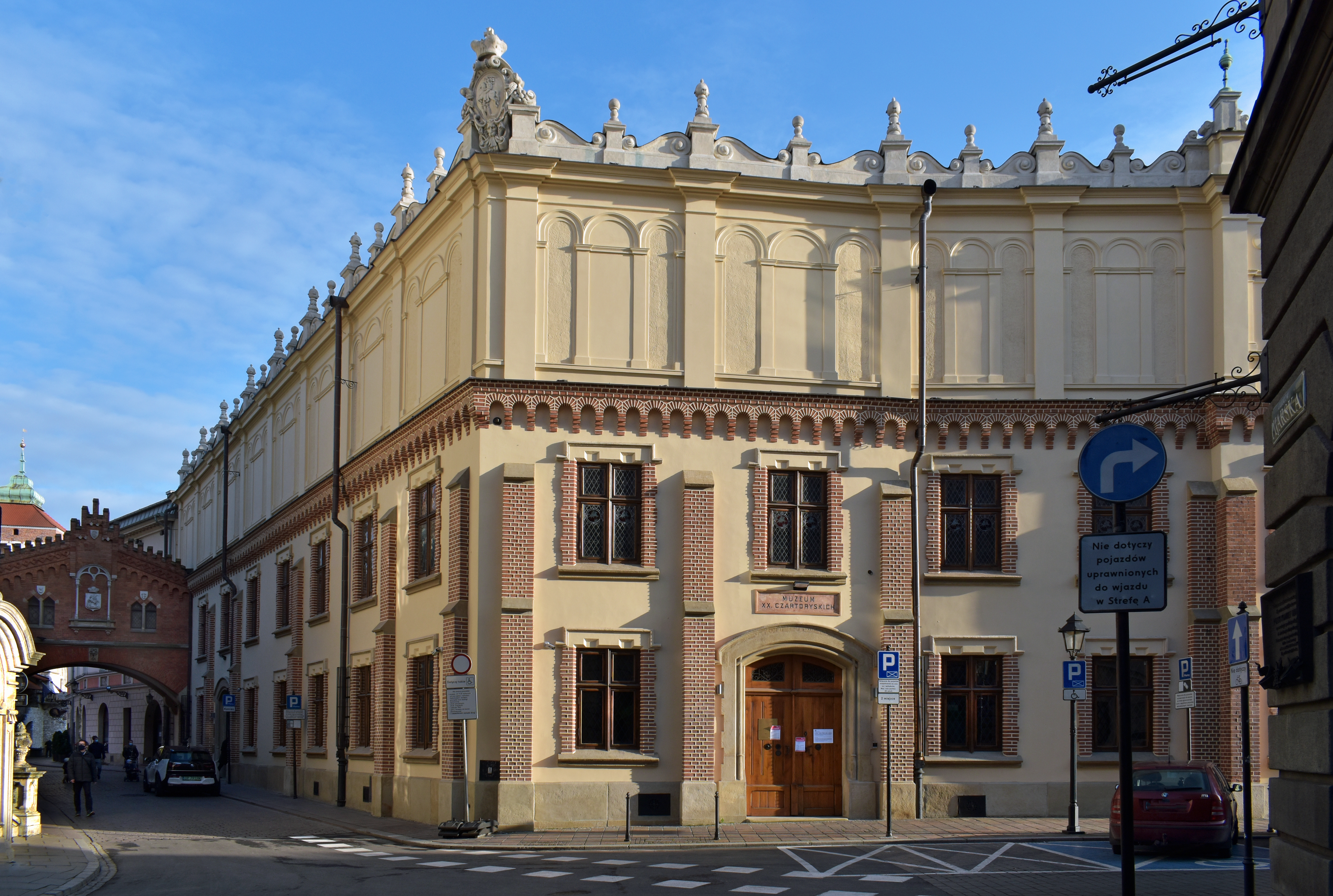
Poland: The Czartoryski Museum in Kraków

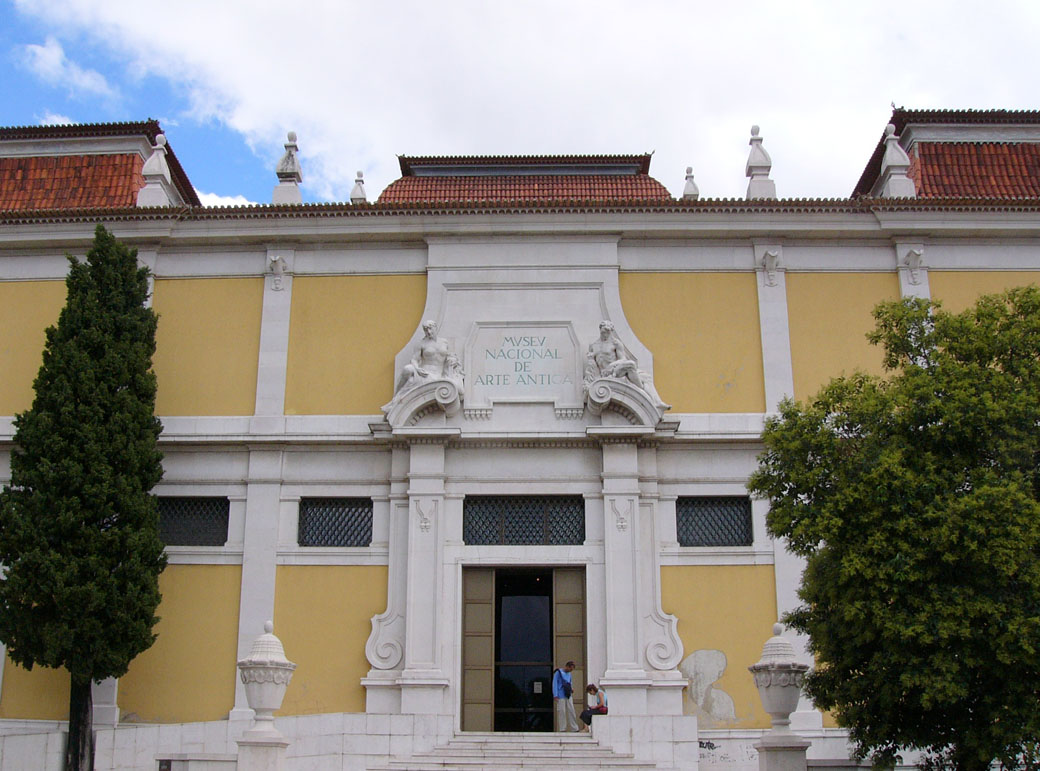
Portugal: The Museu Nacional de Arte Antiga, in Lisbon

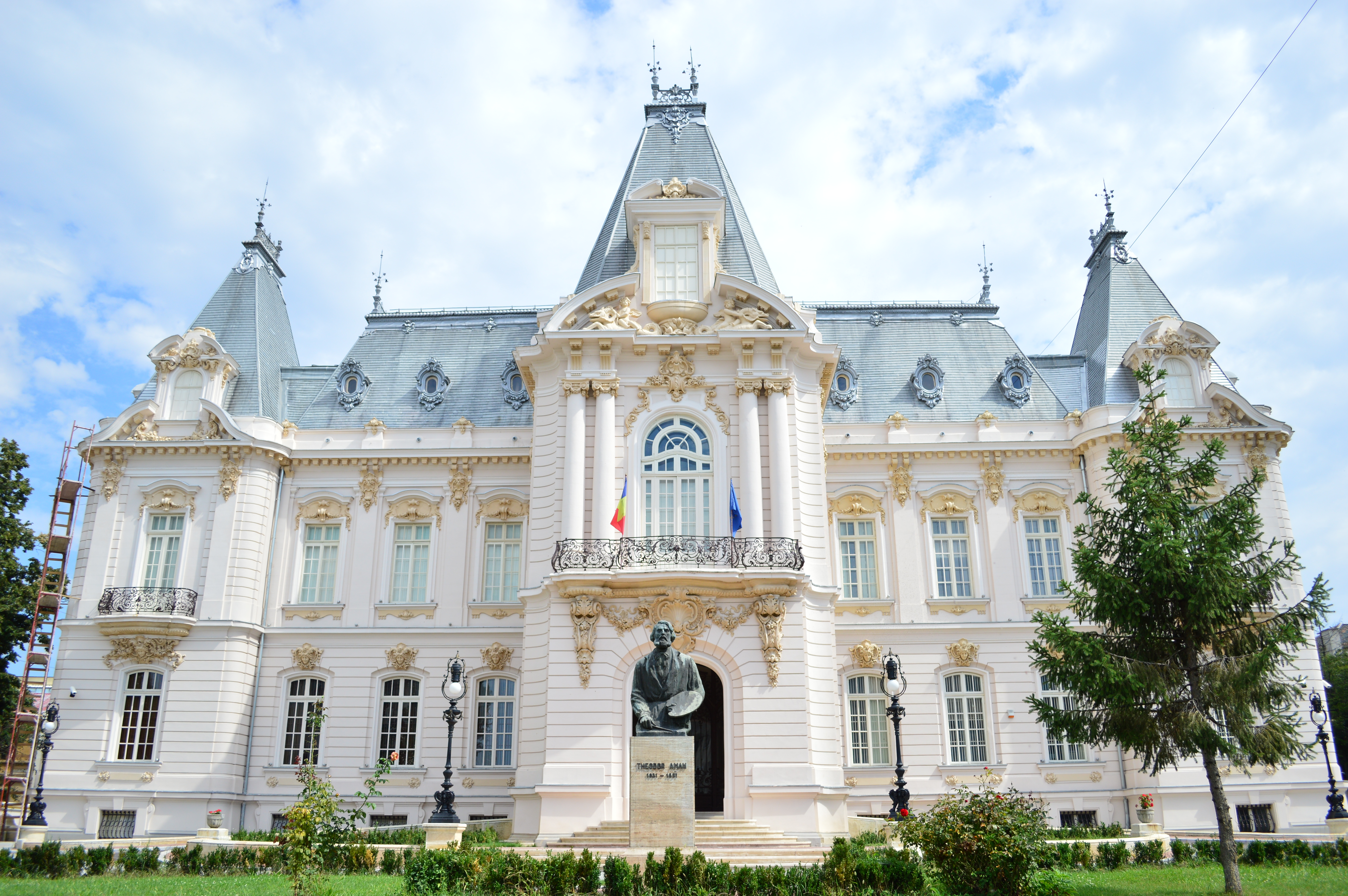
Romania: the Craiova Art Museum

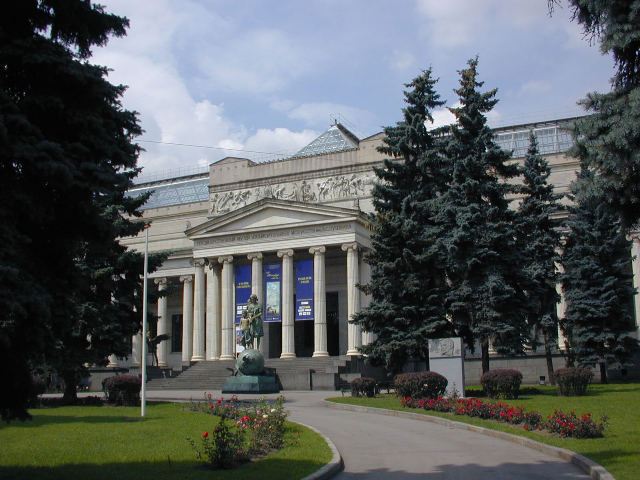
Russia: Pushkin Museum of Fine Arts in Moscow

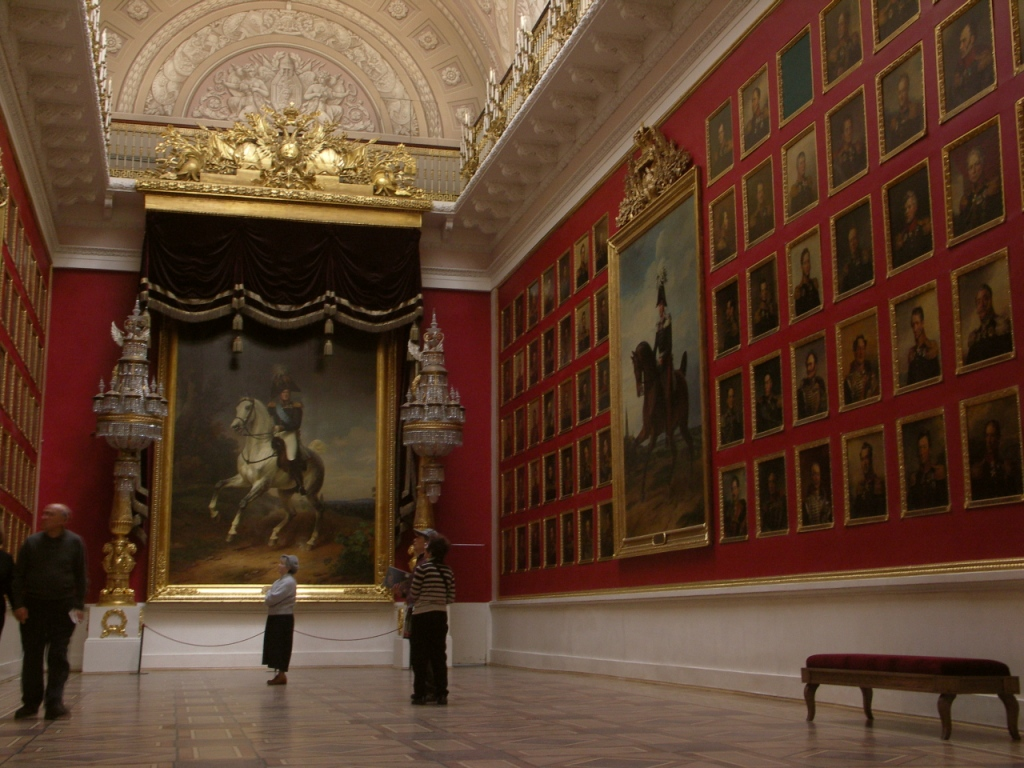
Russia: Inside the Hermitage Museum in St. Petersburg

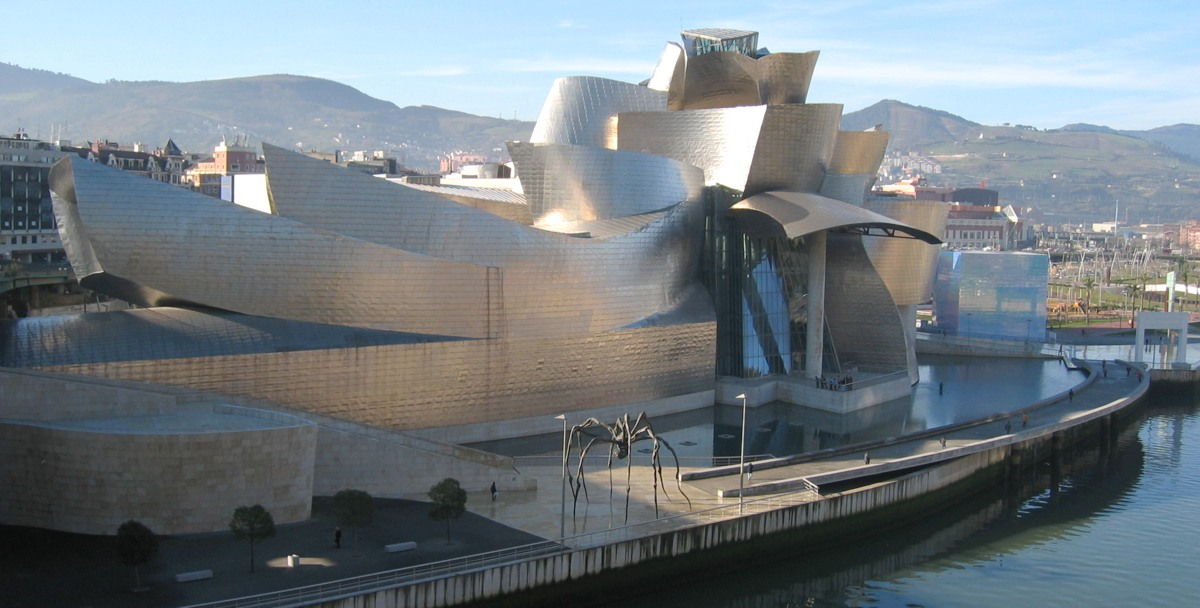
Spain: The Guggenheim Museum Bilbao

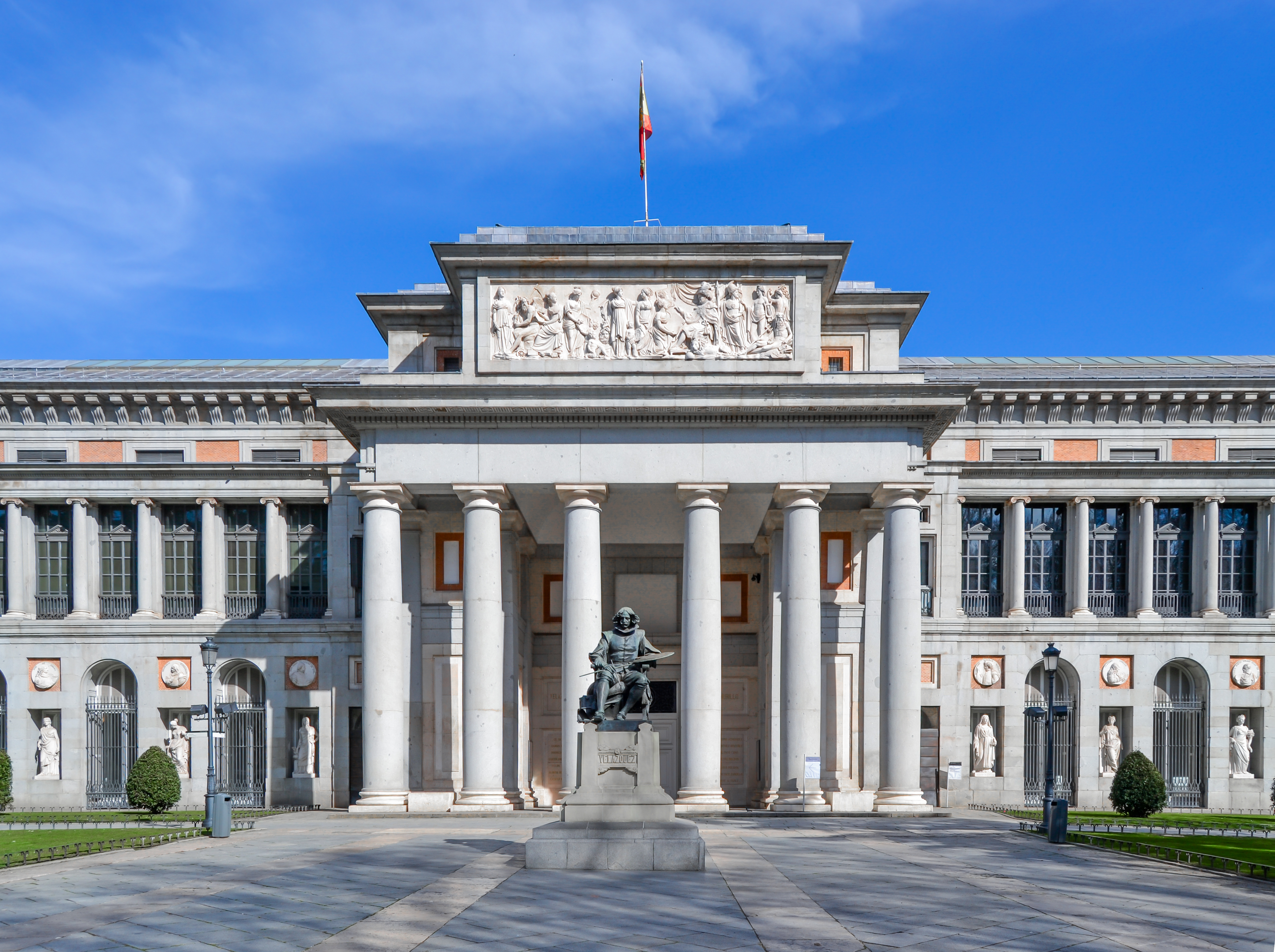
Spain: The Museo del Prado in Madrid

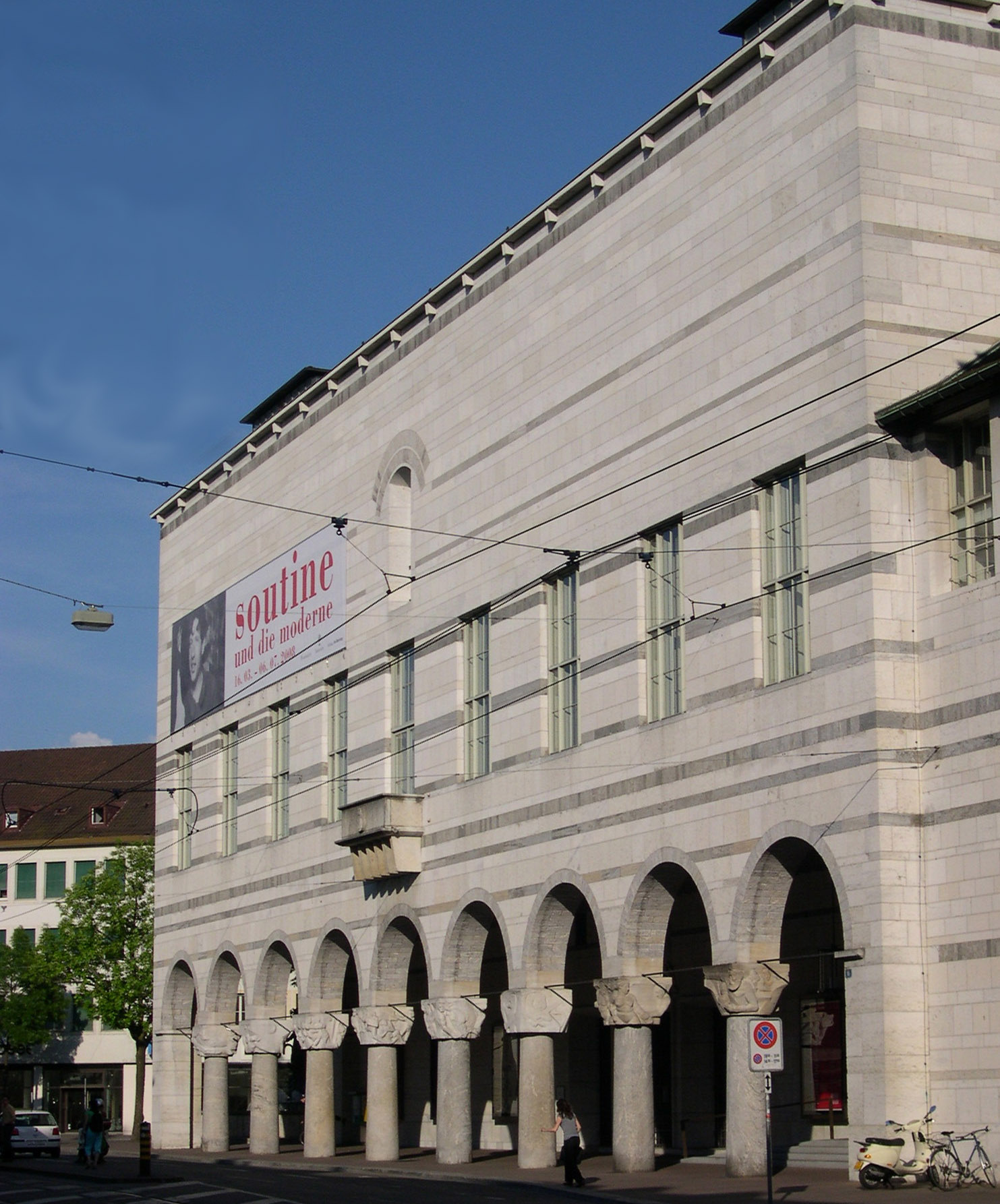
Switzerland: The Kunstmuseum in Basel

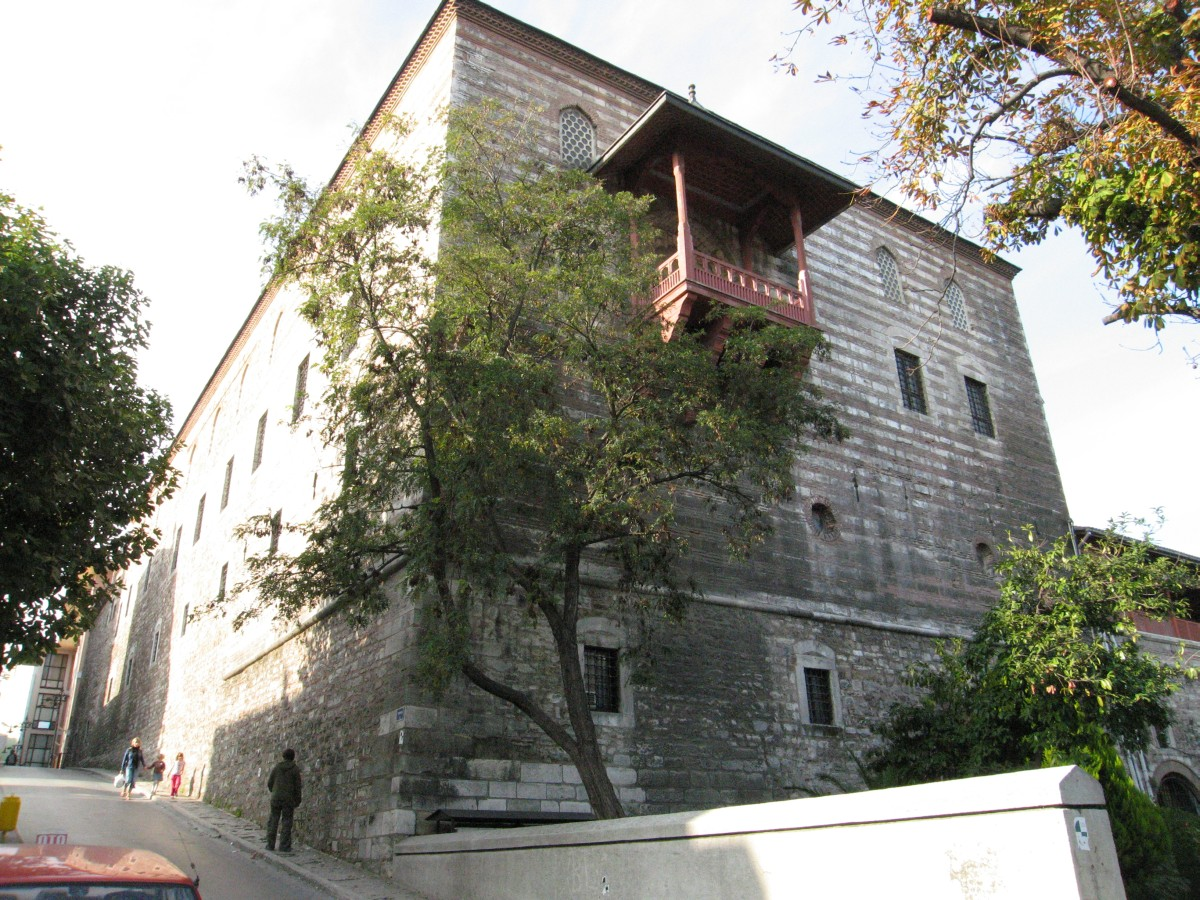
Turkey: The Turkish and Islamic Arts Museum in Istanbul

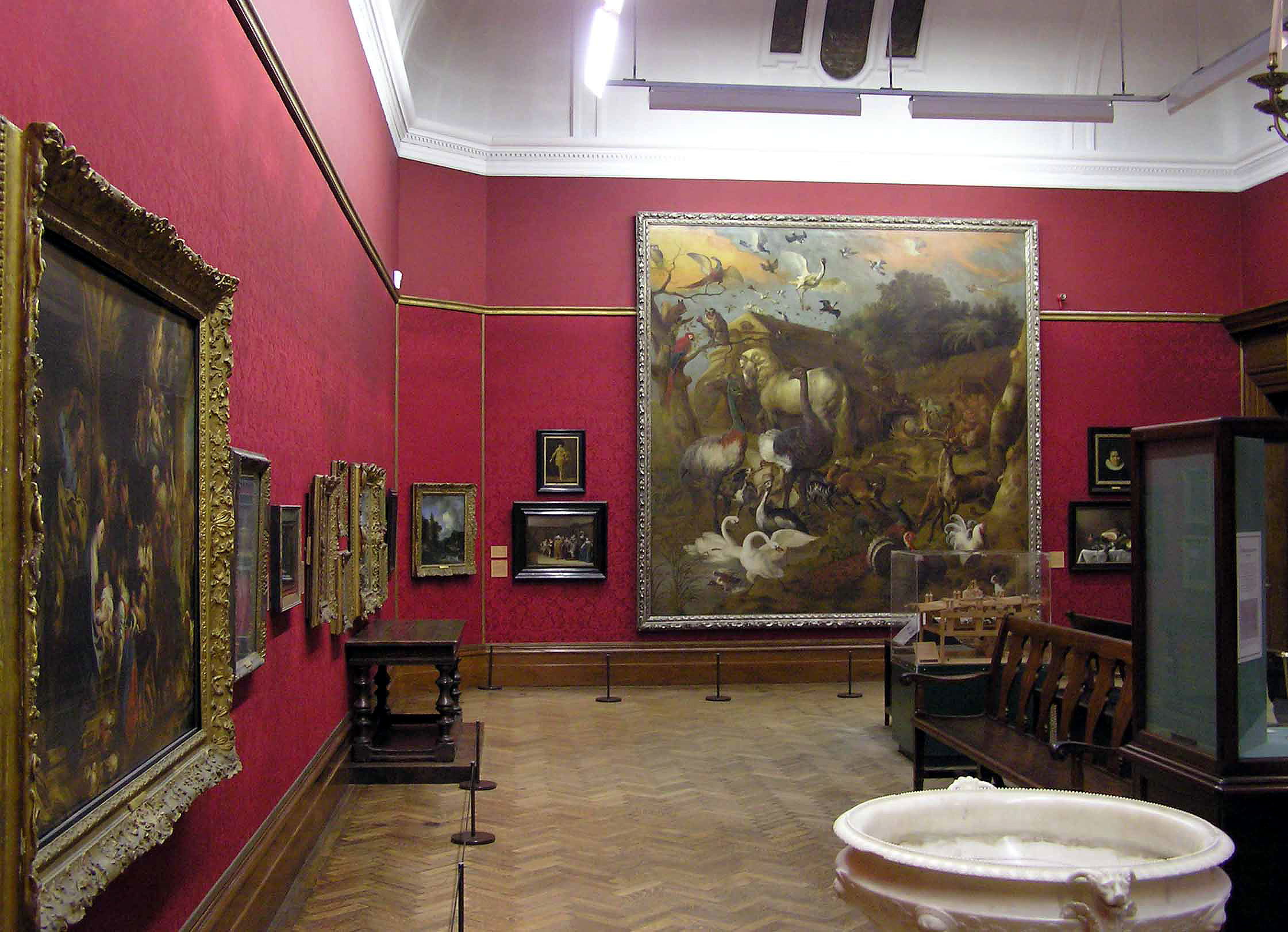
United Kingdom: Inside the Bristol City Museum and Art Gallery, Bristol

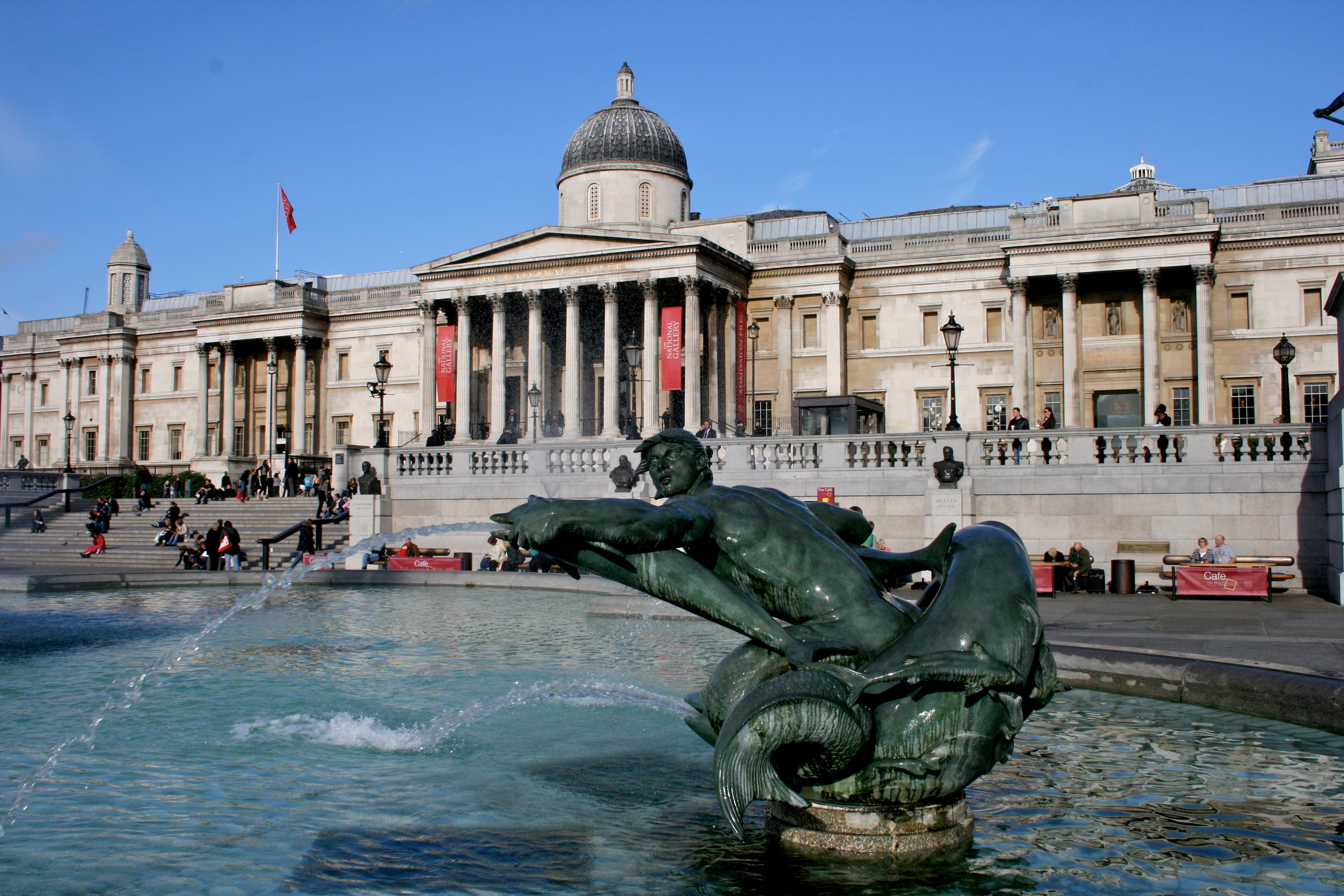
United Kingdom: The National Gallery in London

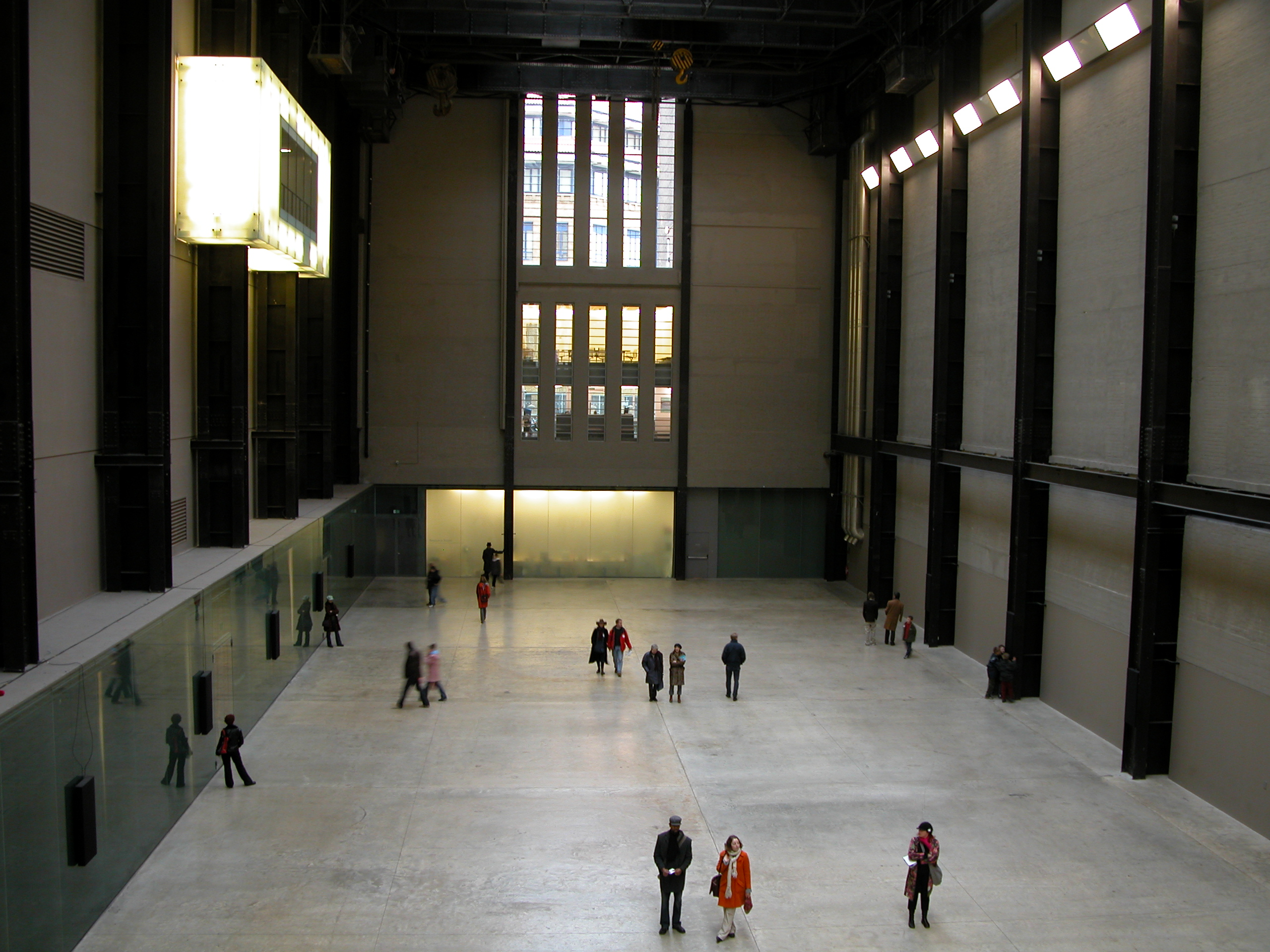
United Kingdom: Turbine hall inside the Tate Modern, London

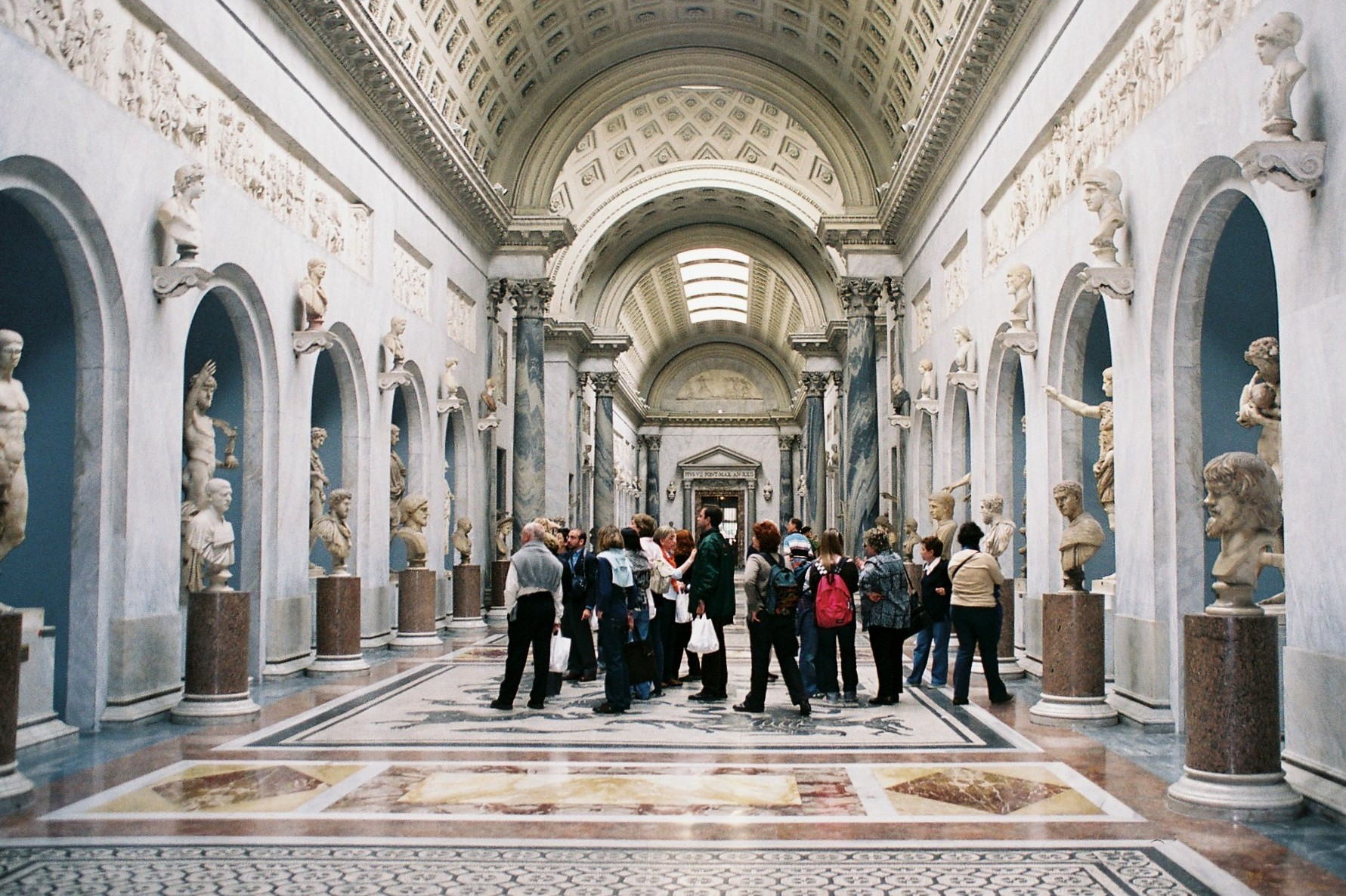
Vatican City: Braccio Nuovo, Vatican Museums

=== Albania ===
- Tirana: National Art Gallery of Albania

=== Armenia ===
- Yerevan: Cafesjian Museum of Art, National Gallery of Armenia

=== Austria ===
- Graz: Universalmuseum Joanneum
- Klagenfurt: Museum Moderner Kunst Kaernten
- Klosterneuburg: Sammlung Essl
- Linz: Lentos Art Museum
- Neuhaus, Kärnten: Museum Liaunig
- Salzburg: Residenzgalerie, Museum der Moderne Salzburg
- Vienna: Kunsthistorisches Museum, Leopold Museum, Albertina, Österreichische Galerie Belvedere, MUMOK, Liechtenstein Museum, Museum für angewandte Kunst, Gemäldegalerie der Akademie der bildenden Künste

=== Azerbaijan ===
- Baku: National Art Museum of Azerbaijan, Baku Museum of Modern Art

=== Belgium ===
- Antwerp: Royal Museum of Fine Arts, Museum Mayer van den Bergh, Rubenshuis, Museum of Modern Art Antwerp (MuHKA)
- Bruges: Groeningemuseum, Old St. John's Hospital
- Brussels: Royal Museums of Fine Arts of Belgium, Cinquantenaire Museum, Horta Museum
- Ghent: Museum of Fine Arts
- Kruishoutem: SONS Museum
- Tournai: Musée des Beaux-Arts Tournai

=== Bulgaria ===
- Sofia: National Gallery for Foreign Art, National Archaeological Museum, National Art Gallery
- Varna: Varna Archaeological Museum

=== Croatia ===
- Split: Gallery of Fine Arts, Ivan Meštrović Gallery
- Zagreb: Art Pavilion, Gliptoteka, Klovićevi dvori, Mimara Museum, Modern Gallery, Zagreb, Museum of Contemporary Art, Zagreb, People and Art House Lauba, Strossmayer Gallery of Old Masters

=== Czech Republic ===
- Nelahozeves: Lobkowicz collection in the Castle (Zamek Nelahozeves)
- Prague: National Gallery, Náprstek Museum, Prague Castle Galleries, Galerie Rudolfinum, Museum of Decorative Arts in Prague, Kunsthalle Praha, Václav Špála Gallery, Josef Sudek Gallery, Museum Kampa, DOX Centre for Contemporary Art

=== Denmark ===
- Aarhus: ARoS Aarhus Kunstmuseum, Moesgaard Museum
- Copenhagen: Arken Museum of Modern Art, Ny Carlsberg Glyptotek, Statens Museum for Kunst, Thorvaldsens Museum
- Humlebæk: Louisiana Museum of Modern Art
- Nivå: Nivaagaards Malerisamling
- Randers: Randers Museum of Art

=== Estonia ===
- Tallinn: Kumu Art Museum, Kadriorg Art Museum, Mikkel Museum, Niguliste Museum, Adamson-Eric Museum
- Tartu: University of Tartu Art Museum, Tartu Art Museum

=== Finland ===
- Helsinki: Ateneum Art Museum, Museum of Contemporary Art Kiasma, Amos Rex, Helsinki Art Museum

=== France ===
- Aix-en-Provence: Musée Granet
- Ajaccio: Musée Fesch
- Amiens: Musée de Picardie
- Arles: Musée de l'Arles et de la Provence antiques
- Avignon: Musée du Petit Palais, Fondation Calvet, Musée Angladon
- Besançon: Musée des Beaux-Arts et d'archéologie
- Bordeaux: Musée des Beaux-Arts de Bordeaux
- Caen: Musée des Beaux-Arts
- Cagnes-sur-Mer : Musée Renoir
- Chantilly: Musée Condé
- Colmar: Unterlinden Museum
- Dijon: Musée des Beaux-Arts
- Dole: Musée des Beaux-Arts
- Écouen: Musée national de la Renaissance
- Épinal: Musée départemental d'Art ancien et contemporain
- Grenoble: Museum of Grenoble
- Le Cateau-Cambrésis: Musée départemental Henri Matisse
- Le Havre: Musée des Beaux-Arts André Malraux
- Lens: Louvre-Lens
- Lille: Palais des Beaux-Arts
- Limoges: Musée des Beaux-Arts
- Lyon: Musée des Beaux-Arts
- Marseille: Musée Grobet-Labadié
- Metz: Centre Pompidou-Metz; The Golden Courtyard Museums
- Montauban: Musée Ingres
- Montpellier: Musée Fabre
- Montsoreau: Château de Montsoreau-Museum of Contemporary Art, Château de Montsoreau
- Nancy: Musée des Beaux-Arts, Musée de l'École de Nancy, Musée Lorrain
- Nantes: Musée des Beaux-Arts
- Nice: Musée des Beaux-Arts de Nice, Musée Matisse, Musée d'art moderne et d'art contemporain, Musée des Arts Asiatiques
- Nîmes: Musée des Beaux-Arts
- Paris: Musée du Louvre, Musée d'Orsay, Musée Rodin, Centre Pompidou, Musée Picasso, Guimet Museum, Musée Marmottan Monet, Musée de Cluny, Musée de l'Orangerie, Musée des Arts Décoratifs, Musée Jacquemart-André, Musée du quai Branly, Petit Palais, Musée d'Art Moderne de la Ville de Paris, Musée Gustave Moreau, Musée Delacroix, Musée Nissim de Camondo, Musée Cognacq-Jay, Musée Maillol, Musée d'Art et d'Histoire du Judaïsme, Musée Carnavalet
- Poitiers: Musée Sainte-Croix
- Reims: Musée des Beaux-Arts
- Rennes: Musée des Beaux-Arts
- Rouen: Musée des Beaux-Arts
- Saint-Germain-en-Laye: National Archaeological Museum
- Saint-Paul, Alpes-Maritimes: Fondation Maeght
- Strasbourg: Musée de l’Œuvre Notre-Dame, Musée des Beaux-Arts, Musée d'art moderne et contemporain, Musée des Arts décoratifs
- Toulouse: Musée des Augustins, Fondation Bemberg
- Tours: Musée des Beaux-Arts
- Troyes: Musée des Beaux-Arts, Musée d'art moderne
- Villeneuve-d'Ascq: Lille Métropole Museum of Modern, Contemporary and Outsider Art

=== Germany ===
- Augsburg: Kunstsammlungen und Museen Augsburg
- Berlin: Bauhaus Archive, Pergamonmuseum, Bodemuseum, Altes Museum, Neues Museum, Alte Nationalgalerie, Gemäldegalerie, Neue Nationalgalerie, Museum Berggruen, Kunstgewerbemuseum, Museum of Asian Art, Museum of Islamic Art, Scharf-Gerstenberg Collection, Brücke Museum, Friedrichswerder Church, Berlinische Galerie, Bröhan Museum, Märkisches Museum, Jewish Museum Berlin
- Bielefeld: Kunsthalle Bielefeld
- Bonn: Kunstmuseum Bonn, Rheinisches Landesmuseum Bonn
- Braunschweig: Herzog Anton Ulrich Museum
- Bremen: Kunsthalle, Paula Modersohn-Becker Museum
- Chemnitz: Museum Gunzenhauser
- Cologne: Museum Ludwig, Wallraf-Richartz Museum, Romano-Germanic Museum, Schnütgen Museum, Käthe Kollwitz Museum, Museum für Angewandte Kunst (Cologne)
- Darmstadt: Hessisches Landesmuseum Darmstadt
- Donaueschingen: Museum Art.Plus
- Dresden: Gemäldegalerie Alte Meister, Grünes Gewölbe, Galerie Neue Meister
- Düsseldorf: Kunstsammlung Nordrhein-Westfalen, museum Kunst Palast
- Duisburg: Lehmbruck Museum, Museum Küppersmühle
- Erfurt: Angermuseum
- Essen: Museum Folkwang
- Frankfurt: Städel, Museum für angewandte Kunst, Museum für Moderne Kunst, Museum Giersch, Liebieghaus
- Freiburg im Breisgau: Augustiner Museum
- Halle, Saxony-Anhalt: Kunstmuseum Moritzburg Halle (Saale)
- Hamburg: Kunsthalle, Bucerius Kunst Forum, Museum für Kunst und Gewerbe, Deichtorhallen
- Hanover: Sprengel Museum, Lower Saxony State Museum, Kestner-Museum
- Heidelberg: Kurpfälzisches Museum
- Karlsruhe: Staatliche Kunsthalle Karlsruhe, Center for Art and Media Karlsruhe
- Kassel: Schloss Wilhelmshöhe
- Leipzig: Museum der bildenden Künste, Museum für angewandte Kunst
- Mainz: Landesmuseum Mainz
- Mannheim: Kunsthalle
- Mönchengladbach: Abteiberg Museum
- Munich: Alte Pinakothek, Neue Pinakothek, Pinakothek der Moderne, Lenbachhaus, Glyptothek, Staatliche Antikensammlungen, Museum Brandhorst, Villa Stuck, Die Neue Sammlung
- Münster: Kunstmuseum Pablo Picasso Münster, Westphalian State Museum of Art and Cultural History
- Nuremberg: Germanisches Nationalmuseum, Neues Museum Nürnberg
- Osnabrück: Felix Nussbaum Haus
- Potsdam: Sanssouci Picture Gallery
- Quedlinburg: Museum Lyonel Feininger
- Saarbrücken: Saarland Museum
- Schwerin: Staatliches Museum
- Stuttgart: Staatsgalerie, Neue Staatsgalerie, Kunstmuseum
- Weimar: Klassik Stiftung Weimar, New Bauhaus Museum
- Wuppertal: Von der Heydt Museum

=== Greece ===
- Athens: National Archaeological Museum of Athens, New Acropolis Museum, Benaki Museum, Museum of Cycladic Art, Vorres Museum
- Delos: Archaeological Museum of Delos
- Delphi: Delphi Archaeological Museum
- Heraklion: Heraklion Archaeological Museum
- Komotini: Archaeological Museum of Komotini
- Olympia, Greece: Archaeological Museum of Olympia
- Rhodes: Archaeological Museum of Rhodes
- Santorini: Archaeological Museum of Thera
- Santorini: Museum of Prehistoric Thera
- Thessaloniki: Archaeological Museum of Thessaloniki

=== Hungary ===
- Budapest: Museum of Fine Arts, Museum of Applied Arts, Hungarian National Gallery, Zelnik István Southeast Asian Gold Museum

=== Iceland ===
- Reykjavík: Reykjavík Art Museum

=== Ireland ===
- Dublin: Hugh Lane Municipal Gallery, Irish Museum of Modern Art, National Gallery of Ireland

=== Italy ===
- Aosta: Regional Archaeological Museum of Aosta Valley, Museum of the Cathedral's Treasure
- Arezzo: Museo statale d'arte medievale e moderna
- Bacoli: Archaeological Museum of the Campi Flegrei
- Bari: Pinacoteca Provinciale di Bari
- Bergamo: Accademia Carrara
- Bologna: Pinacoteca Nazionale di Bologna, Bologna Museum of Modern Art, Museo Civico Medievale
- Bolzano: South Tyrol Museum of Archaeology
- Brescia: Pinacoteca Tosio Martinengo
- Brixen: Diocesan Museum
- Cesena: Malatestiana Library, Pinacoteca Comunale di Cesena
- Ferrara: Pinacoteca Nazionale, Palazzo Schifanoia, Cathedral Museum, National Archaeological Museum of Ferrara
- Florence: Uffizi Gallery, Fine Arts Academy, Palazzo Pitti, Bargello, Museo Nazionale di San Marco, Archaeological Museum of Florence
- Foggia: Civi Museum and Pinacoteca Comunale
- Forlì: Pinacoteca Civica di Forlì
- Genoa: Musei di Strada Nuova, Diocesan Museum, Museum of Genoa Cathedral's Treasure, Doge's Genoa, Palazzo Reale
- Livorno: Museo Civico Giovanni Fattori
- Mantua: Palazzo Ducale, Palazzo Te
- Messina: Museo Regionale
- Milan: Castello Sforzesco, Pinacoteca di Brera, Pinacoteca Ambrosiana, Museo Poldi Pezzoli, Museo del Novecento, Civico museo d'arte contemporanea, Padiglione d'Arte Contemporanea
- Modena: Galleria Estense
- Naples: Museo di Capodimonte, Naples National Archaeological Museum, Caserta Palace
- Palermo: Museo archeologico regionale Antonio Salinas, Palazzo Abatellis
- Parma: Galleria Nazionale di Parma, Palazzo della Pilotta
- Parma: Museo archeologico nazionale di Parma, Pinacoteca Stuard
- Perugia: Galleria Nazionale dell'Umbria
- Piacenza: Galleria d'Arte Moderna "Ricci Oddi", Civic Museums of Palazzo Farnese
- Piombino: Archaeological Museum of Populonia
- Pisa: Museo dell'Opera del Duomo, Camposanto Monumentale, Pisa Charterhouse
- Prato: Civic Museum, Museo dell'Opera del Duomo, Gallery of Palazzo degli Alberti
- Reggello: Museo Masaccio
- Reggio Calabria: Museo Nazionale della Magna Grecia
- Rome: Galleria Borghese, National Museum of Rome, Palazzo Barberini, Palazzo delle Esposizioni, Capitoline Museums, National Etruscan Museum, Doria Pamphilj Gallery, Galleria Colonna, Galleria Spada, Museum of Roman Civilization, Galleria Nazionale d'Arte Antica, Galleria Nazionale d'Arte Moderna, Museum of Contemporary Art of Rome, MAXXI – National Museum of the 21st Century Arts
- Sansepolcro: Pinacoteca Comunale
- Siena: Museo archeologico nazionale di Siena, Museo dell'Opera Metropolitana del Duomo, Pinacoteca Nazionale, Museo Civico inside Palazzo Pubblico
- Syracuse, Sicily: Archaeological Museum
- Trento: Buonconsiglio Castle, Museum of Modern and Contemporary Art of Trento and Rovereto, Diocesan Museum
- Turin: Museo Egizio, Museum of Ancient Art, Pinacoteca Giovanni e Marella Agnelli, Galleria Sabauda, Diocesan Museum of Turin, Museum of Oriental Art
- Urbino:Galleria Nazionale delle Marche
- Venice: Gallerie dell'Accademia, Peggy Guggenheim Collection, Museo Correr, Museo Fortuny, Ca' Rezzonico, Ca' d'Oro, Ca' Pesaro, Palazzo Grimani, Punta della Dogana
- Verona: Castelvecchio Museum
- Volterra: Museo diocesano di arte sacra, Pinacoteca e museo civico, Museo etrusco Guarnacci

=== Liechtenstein ===
- Vaduz: Kunstmuseum Liechtenstein

=== Lithuania ===
- Stasys Eidrigevičius – Stasys Museum, Panevėžys, Lithuania

=== Luxembourg ===
- Luxembourg City: Mudam, National Museum of History and Art

=== Netherlands ===
- Amstelveen: Cobra Museum
- Amsterdam: H'ART Museum, Rijksmuseum Amsterdam, Stedelijk Museum, Van Gogh Museum
- Eindhoven: Van Abbemuseum
- Enschede: Rijksmuseum Twenthe
- Groningen: Groninger Museum
- Haarlem: Frans Hals Museum
- Laren, North Holland: Singer Laren
- Leerdam: Hofje van Mevrouw Van Aerden
- Leiden: Rijksmuseum van Oudheden, Stedelijk Museum De Lakenhal
- Maastricht: Bonnefanten Museum
- Otterlo: Kröller-Müller Museum
- Rotterdam: Museum Boijmans Van Beuningen, Kunsthal
- The Hague: Mauritshuis, Museum Bredius, Gemeentemuseum
- Utrecht: Centraal Museum, Museum Catharijneconvent

=== Norway ===
- Bærum: Henie-Onstad Art Centre
- Oslo: National Museum of Art, Architecture and Design, Munch Museum

=== Poland ===
- Bielsko-Biała: Bielsko-Biała Museum and Castle
- Bydgoszcz: Leon Wyczółkowski Regional Museum
- Gdańsk: Muzeum Narodowe
- Katowice: Silesian Museum
- Kielce: National Museum of Kielce
- Kozłówka: Museum of the Zamoyski Family
- Kraków: Czartoryski Museum, National Museum, Kraków, Sukiennice Museum, MOCAK Museum of Contemporary Art, Wawel Royal Castle National Art Collection, EUROPEUM – European Culture Centre
- Lublin: National Museum, Lublin
- Łódź: Museum of Art in Łódź
- Poznań: National Museum, Poznań
- Pszczyna: Castle Museum of Pszczyna
- Siedlce: Diocesan Museum in Siedlce
- Szczecin: National Museum
- Toruń: District Museum in Toruń
- Warsaw: National Museum, Ujazdów Centre for Contemporary Art, Zachęta National Gallery of Art, King John III Palace Museum, Lanckoroński Collection in the Royal Castle, Academy of Fine Arts Museum inside Czapski Palace, Porczyński Gallery, Lazienki Palace Museum
- Wrocław: National Museum, Wrocław

=== Portugal ===
- Lisbon: Museu Nacional de Arte Antiga, Museu Calouste Gulbenkian, Museu Colecção Berardo
- Porto: Serralves

=== Romania ===
- Bucharest: National Museum of Art of Romania, The Art Collections Museum, National Museum of Contemporary Art, K.H. Zambaccian Museum, Theodor Pallady Museum, George Severeanu Museum, Frederic and Cecilia Cuțescu-Storck Art Museum
- Craiova: Art Museum
- Iaşi: Art Museum
- Ploiești: Ploiești Art Museum
- Sibiu: Brukenthal National Museum
- Timişoara: Timisoara Art Museum
- Tulcea: Tulcea Art Museum

=== Russia ===
- Moscow: State Tretyakov Gallery, Pushkin Museum, Kremlin Armoury, Moscow Museum of Modern Art, Moscow House of Photography, State Historical Museum
- St. Petersburg: Hermitage, Russian Museum
- Saratov: Radischev Art Museum
- Taganrog: Taganrog Museum of Art

=== Serbia ===
- Belgrade: Belgrade City Museum, White Palace, National Museum of Serbia, Museum of Contemporary Art
- Novi Sad: The Gallery of Fine Arts – Gift Collection of Rajko Mamuzić, Galery of Matica Srpska, Pavle Beljanski Memorial Collection, Museum of Vojvodina, Museum of Contemporary Art of Vojvodina

=== Slovenia ===
- Ljubljana: Museum of Modern Art
- Kostanjevica na Krki: Božidar Jakac Art Museum
- Slovenj Gradec: Museum of Modern and Contemporary Art Koroška

=== Spain ===
- Alcalá de Henares: Museo de Escultura al Aire Libre de Alcalá de Henares
- Barcelona: Museu Nacional d'Art de Catalunya, Museu Picasso, Fundació Joan Miró, Fundació Antoni Tàpies, Barcelona Museum of Contemporary Art
- Bilbao: Guggenheim Museum, Bilbao Fine Arts Museum
- Cádiz: Museo de Cádiz
- Córdoba, Spain: Museo Arqueológico y Etnológico de Córdoba
- Figueres: Dalí Theatre and Museum
- Granada: Sacristy Museum (Sacristía-Museo) of the Royal Chapel of Granada
- Madrid: Museo del Prado, Museo Reina Sofia, Museo Thyssen Bornemisza, National Archaeological Museum of Spain, Museo Sorolla, Museo Lázaro Galdiano, Museo Cerralbo, Real Academia de Bellas Artes de San Fernando, Museum of the Americas, Royal Palace
- Málaga: Museo Picasso Málaga
- San Lorenzo de El Escorial: El Escorial
- Seville: Museum of Fine Arts, Museo Arqueológico de Sevilla
- Toledo: Casa y Museo El Greco, Sacristy of Toledo Cathedral
- Valencia: Museu de Belles Arts de València
- Valladolid: Museum of Sculpture

=== Sweden ===
- Gothenburg: Gothenburg Museum of Art
- Mariefred: National Portrait Gallery
- Stockholm: Nationalmuseum, Moderna Museet, Tensta Konsthall
- Halmstad: Mjellby konstmuseum

=== Switzerland ===
- Basel: Kunstmuseum, Museum of Contemporary Art, Museum Tinguely
- Bern: Kunstmuseum, Zentrum Paul Klee, Museum of Fine Arts
- Davos: Kirchner Museum
- Geneva: Fondation Baur, Musée d'Art et d'Histoire, Musée Rath, Barbier-Mueller Museum, Musée Ariana, MAMCO
- La Chaux-de-Fonds: Musée des beaux-arts
- Lausanne: Collection de l'art brut, Cantonal Museum of Fine Arts, Musée de l'Élysée, Museum of Contemporary Design and Applied Arts
- Riehen: Beyeler Foundation
- Solothurn: Kunstmuseum Solothurn
- St. Moritz: Segantini Museum
- Thun: Kunstmuseum Thun
- Vevey: Musée Jenisch
- Winterthur: Museum Oskar Reinhart, Collection Oskar Reinhart Am Römerholz, Kunstmuseum Winterthur, Fotomuseum Winterthur
- Zurich: Kunsthaus, Foundation E.G. Bührle, Rietberg Museum, Centre Le Corbusier, Swiss National Museum

=== Turkey ===
- Ankara: State Art and Sculpture Museum, Erimtan Archaeology and Arts Museum, Hacettepe Museum, Gazi University Art and Sculpture Museum, Müze Evliyagil, Cer Modern, Mustafa Ayaz Museum, Hamiye Çolakoğlu Ceramic Museum, Şefik Bursalı Museum House
- Avanos: Güray Müze
- Bayburt: Baksı Museum
- Bursa: Bursa Museum of Turkish and Islamic Art
- Edirne: Edirne Museum of Turkish and Islamic Art, Trakya University Contemporary Art and Sculpture Museum
- Erzurum: Yakutiye Medrese
- Eskişehir: Anadolu University Contemporary Art Museum, Odunpazarı Modern Müze
- Istanbul: İstanbul State Art and Sculpture Museum, Türkiye İş Bankası Art and Sculpture Museum, Pera Museum, Dogancay Museum, Sakıp Sabancı Museum, Topkapı Palace, Turkish and Islamic Arts Museum, Tiled Kiosk, Istanbul Museum of Modern Art, SantralIstanbul, Istanbul Contemporary Art Museum, Museum of Turkish Calligraphy Art, Proje4L / Elgiz Museum of Contemporary Art, Arter (art center), SALT (institution), Sadberk Hanım Museum, Rezan Has Museum, Perili Köşk, National Palaces Painting Museum, Istanbul Carpet Museum, Istanbul Museum of Graphic Arts, Ara Güler Museum, Cendere Art Museum, Artistanbul Feshane, Casa Botter
- İzmir: İzmir Art and Sculpture Museum, Arkas Art Center, Selçuk Yaşar Museum of Arts
- İznik: İznik Museum
- Konya: Ince Minaret Medrese, Karatay Medrese
- Kütahya: Kütahya Porcelain Museum, Kütahya Ceramic Museum
- Mersin: Mersin State Art and Sculpture Museum

=== Ukraine ===
- Kyiv: Museum of Western and Oriental Art
- Lviv: Lviv National Art Gallery
- Odesa: Odesa Museum of Western and Eastern Art

=== United Kingdom ===
- Barnard Castle: Bowes Museum
- Bath: Holburne Museum of Art
- Birmingham: Birmingham Museum & Art Gallery, Barber Institute of Fine Arts
- Bristol (UK): Royal West of England Academy, Bristol City Museum and Art Gallery
- Cambridge (UK): Fitzwilliam Museum, Kettle's Yard
- Cardiff: National Museum
- Coventry: Herbert Art Gallery and Museum
- Edinburgh: National Gallery of Scotland, Scottish National Gallery of Modern Art, Dean Gallery, Scottish National Portrait Gallery
- Glasgow: Gallery of Modern Art, Kelvingrove Art Gallery and Museum, Burrell Collection, Hunterian Art Gallery
- Leeds: Royal Armouries Museum, Temple Newsam, Leeds Art Gallery
- Liverpool: Walker Art Gallery, Tate Liverpool, Sudley House
- London: National Gallery, National Portrait Gallery, Tate Britain, Tate Modern, Victoria and Albert Museum, British Museum, Dulwich Picture Gallery, Saatchi Gallery, Courtauld Gallery, Royal Collection, Sir John Soane's Museum, Kenwood House, Wallace Collection, Apsley House, Foundling Museum, Guildhall Art Gallery, Leighton House Museum, Ranger's House (Wernher Collection), Hermitage Rooms, The Hayward, Two Temple Place
- Manchester: Manchester Art Gallery
- Margate: Turner Contemporary
- Oxford: Ashmolean Museum, Christ Church Picture Gallery
- St Ives: Tate St Ives
- Wakefield: Hepworth Gallery, Yorkshire Sculpture Park

=== Vatican City ===
- Vatican Museums

== North America ==
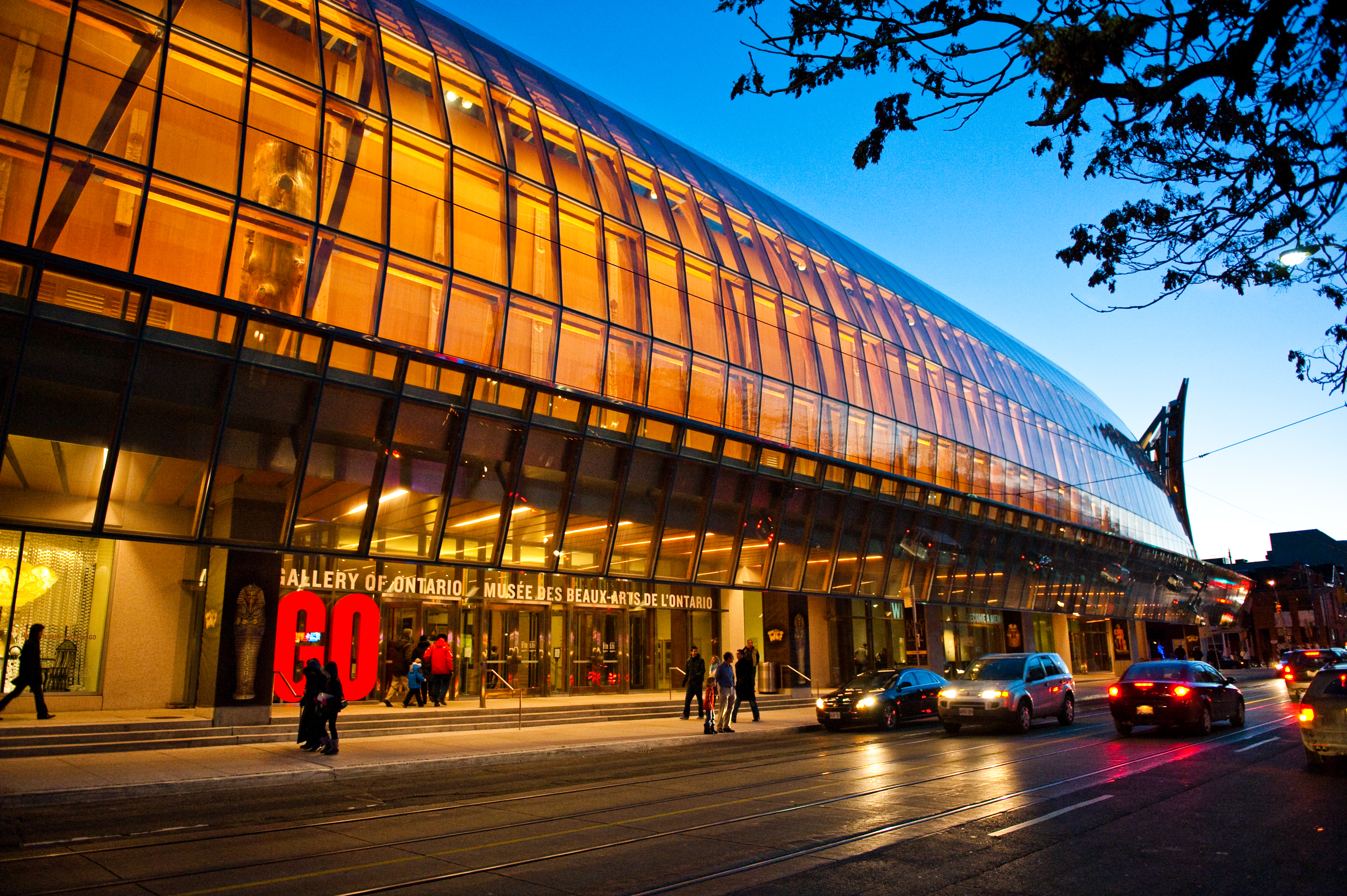
Canada: Art Gallery of Ontario in Toronto, Ontario

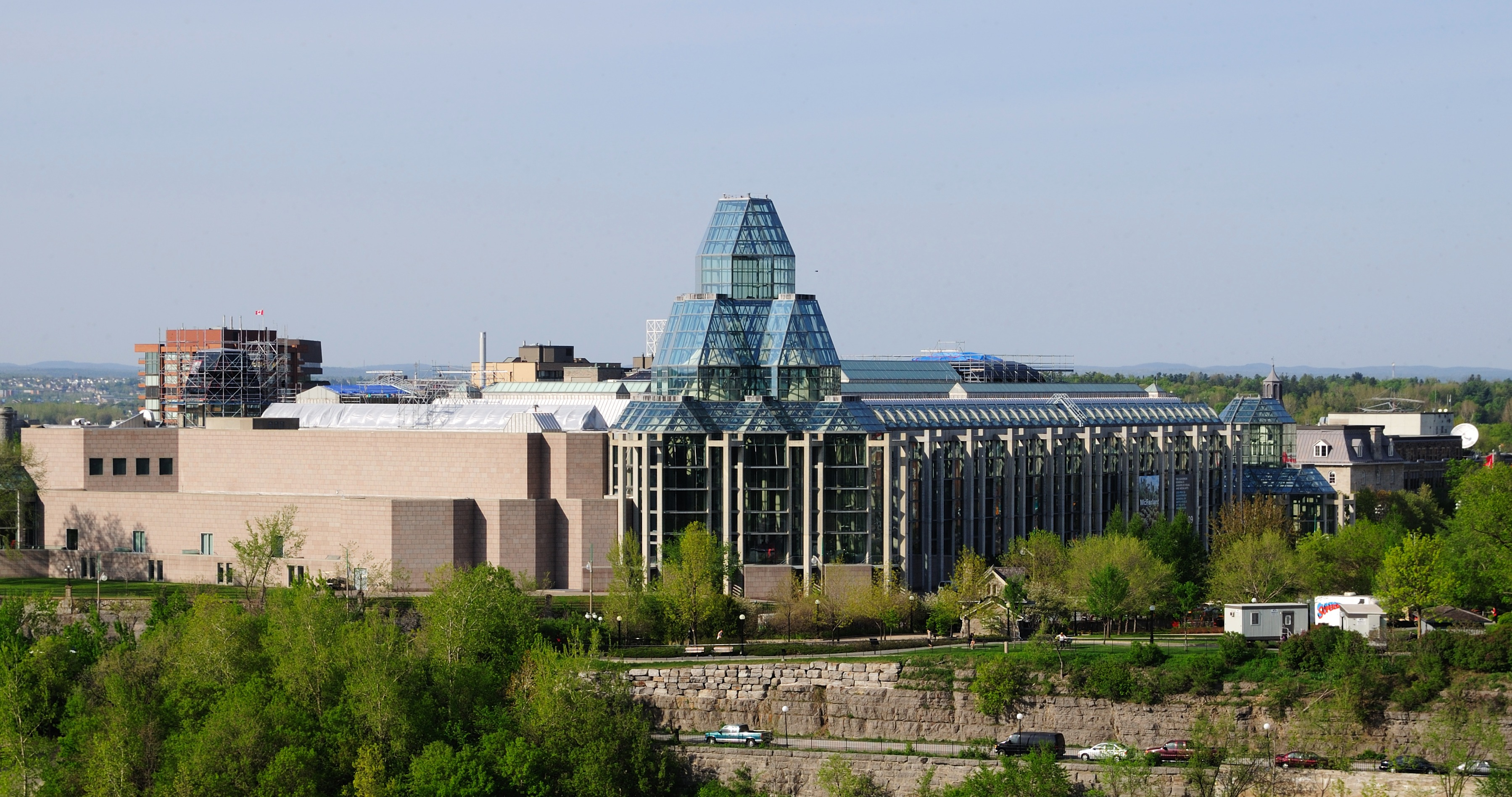
Canada: National Gallery of Canada in Ottawa, Ontario

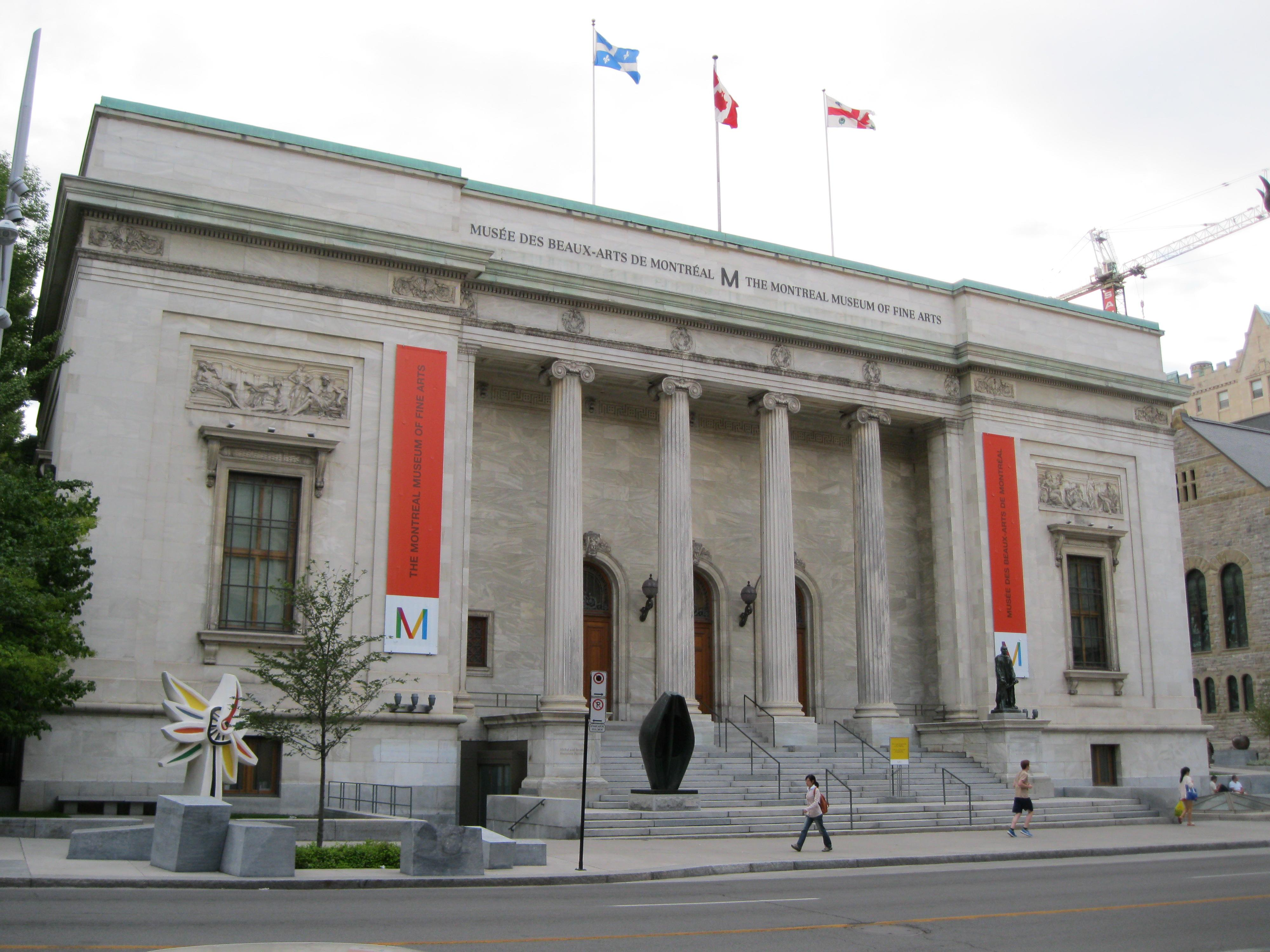
Canada:Montreal Museum of Fine Arts in Montreal, Quebec

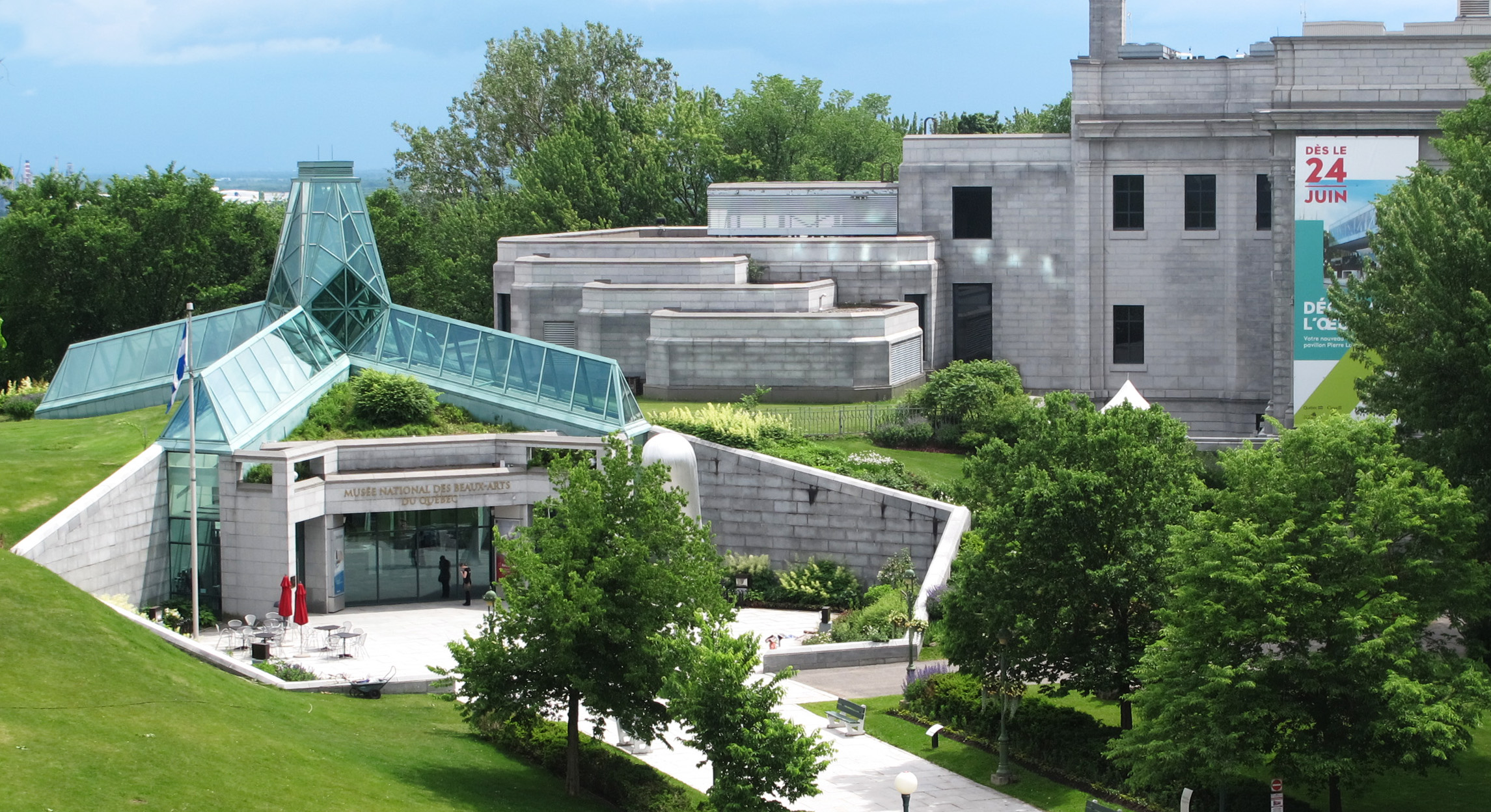
Canada: Musée national des beaux-arts du Québec in Quebec City, Quebec

=== Bermuda ===
- Paget Parish: Masterworks Museum of Bermuda Art

=== Canada ===
- Baie-Saint-Paul, Quebec: Musée d'art contemporain de Baie-Saint-Paul
- Banff, Alberta: Walter Phillips Gallery
- Barrie, Ontario: MacLaren Art Centre
- Brampton, Ontario: Peel Art Gallery, Museum and Archives
- Burlington, Ontario: Art Gallery of Burlington
- Calgary, Alberta: Glenbow Museum
- Edmonton, Alberta: Art Gallery of Alberta
- Fredericton, New Brunswick: Beaverbrook Art Gallery
- Guelph, Ontario: Art Gallery of Guelph
- Halifax, Nova Scotia: Art Gallery of Nova Scotia
- Hamilton, Ontario: Arctic Experience McNaught Gallery, Art Gallery of Hamilton, McMaster Museum of Art
- Lethbridge, Alberta: Southern Alberta Art Gallery
- Kingston, Ontario: Agnes Etherington Art Centre
- Mississauga, Ontario: Art Gallery of Mississauga, The Blackwood
- Montreal, Quebec: Musée d'art contemporain de Montréal, Montreal Museum of Fine Arts
- Niagara-on-the-Lake, Ontario: RiverBrink Art Museum
- Oshawa, Ontario: Robert McLaughlin Gallery
- Ottawa, Ontario: National Gallery of Canada, Ottawa Art Gallery, Portrait Gallery of Canada
- Peterborough, Ontario: Art Gallery of Peterborough
- Quebec City, Quebec: Musée national des beaux-arts du Québec
- Regina, Saskatchewan: MacKenzie Art Gallery
- Sackville, New Brunswick: Owens Art Gallery
- Saint John, New Brunswick: New Brunswick Museum
- Saskatoon, Saskatchewan: Remai Modern
- Sault Ste. Marie, Ontario: Art Gallery of Algoma
- Sherbrooke, Quebec: Sherbrooke Museum of Fine Arts
- St. John's, Newfoundland and Labrador: The Rooms
- Stratford, Ontario: Gallery Stratford
- Toronto, Ontario: Art Gallery of Ontario, Art Museum at the University of Toronto, Design Exchange, Gallery Arcturus, Gardiner Museum, The Image Centre, Museum of Contemporary Art Toronto Canada, Royal Ontario Museum
- Thunder Bay, Ontario: Thunder Bay Art Gallery
- Vancouver, British Columbia: Emily Carr House, Morris and Helen Belkin Art Gallery, Vancouver Art Gallery
- Vaughan, Ontario: McMichael Canadian Art Collection
- Victoria, British Columbia: Art Gallery of Greater Victoria, Maltwood Art Museum and Gallery
- Waterloo, Ontario: Canadian Clay and Glass Gallery
- Whitehorse: Yukon Arts Centre
- Windsor, Ontario: Art Gallery of Windsor
- Winnipeg, Manitoba: Ace Art inc., Blinkers, C2 Centre for Craft, Gallery 1C03, Gallery One One One, Leo Mol Gallery and Sculpture Garden, Manitoba Crafts Museum and Library, Martha Street Studio, Pavilion Gallery Museum, Platform Centre for Photographic + Digital Arts, Plug In Institute of Contemporary Art, Urban Shaman Contemporary Aboriginal Art, Winnipeg Art Gallery

=== Dominican Republic ===
- Santo Domingo: Museo Bellapart

=== Mexico ===
- Aguascalientes: Museo de Aguascalientes
- Cancún: Cancún Underwater Museum
- Mexico City: Palacio de Bellas Artes, Museo Nacional de Arte, Colección Júmex, Frida Kahlo Museum, Museo Mural Diego Rivera, Museo Dolores Olmedo, Museo Rufino Tamayo, Museo Soumaya, Museo de Arte Moderno, Palace of Iturbide, San Ildefonso College, José Luis Cuevas Museum, Centro Nacional de las Artes, Academy of San Carlos, Caricature Museum, Mexico City, Popular Art Museum, Mexico City, Franz Mayer Museum, Museo del Estanquillo, National Museum of Cultures, Centro Cultural Border (Mexico City), Centro Cultural de España, Galería de Arte Mexicano, Galería OMR, Museo de la Secretaría de Hacienda y Crédito Público, Museo Universitario Arte Contemporáneo, Museo de la Estampa, Museo Universitario del Chopo, Museo Carillo Gil
- Monterrey: Museo de Arte Contemporáneo de Monterrey, Museo del Palacio de Gobierno de Nuevo Leon

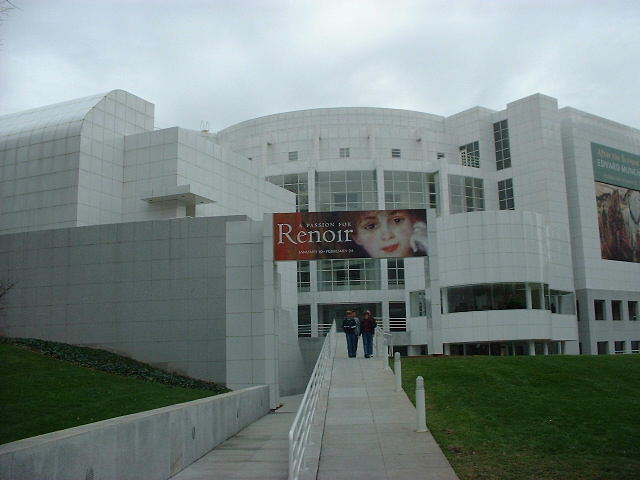
United States: The High Museum of Art in Atlanta, Georgia

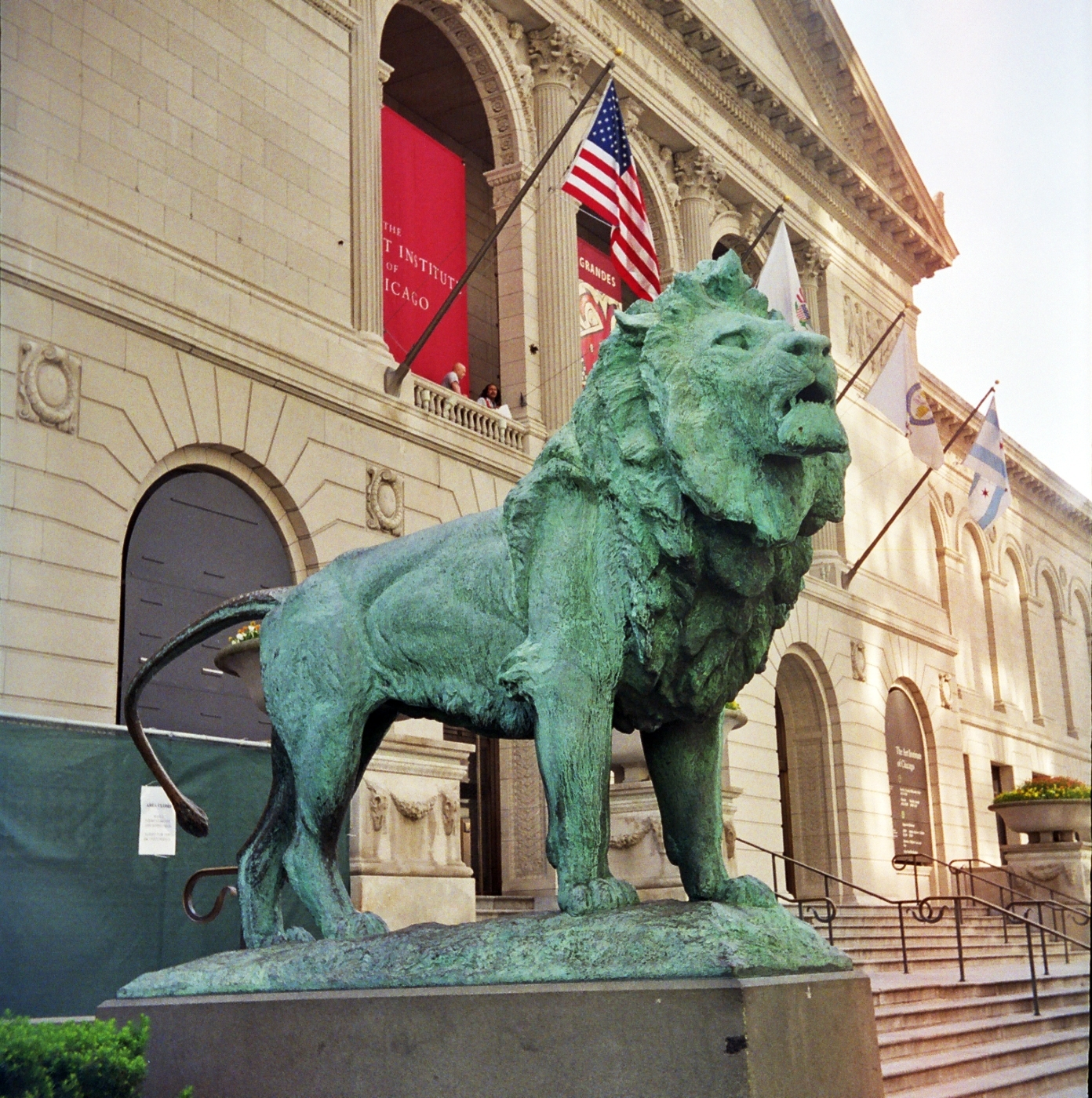
United States: Art Institute of Chicago in Chicago, Illinois

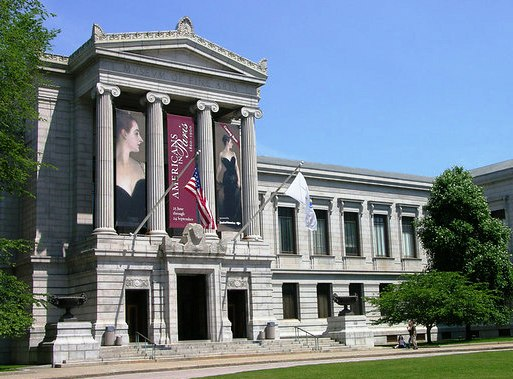
United States. Museum of Fine Arts in Boston, Massachusetts

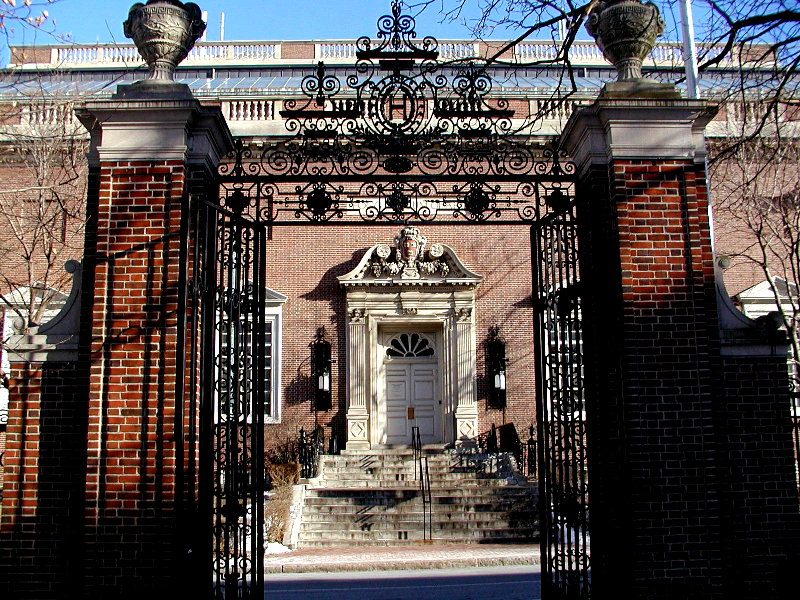
United States: The Fogg is one three Harvard Art Museums in Cambridge, Massachusetts

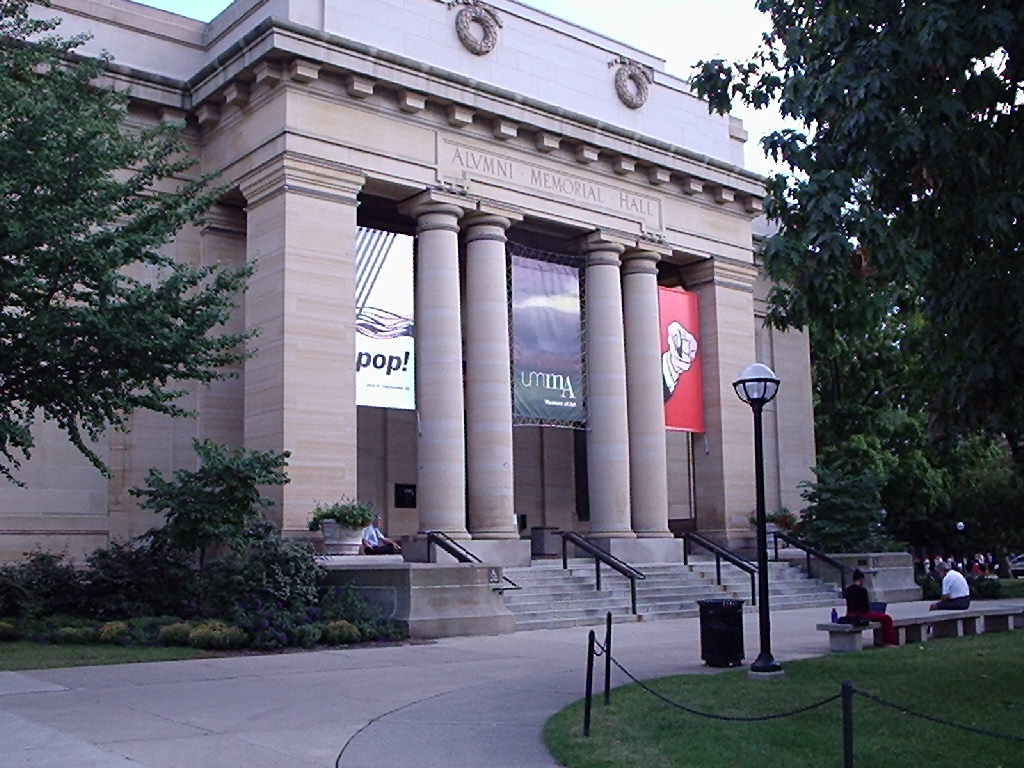
United States: The University of Michigan Museum of Art in Ann Arbor, Michigan

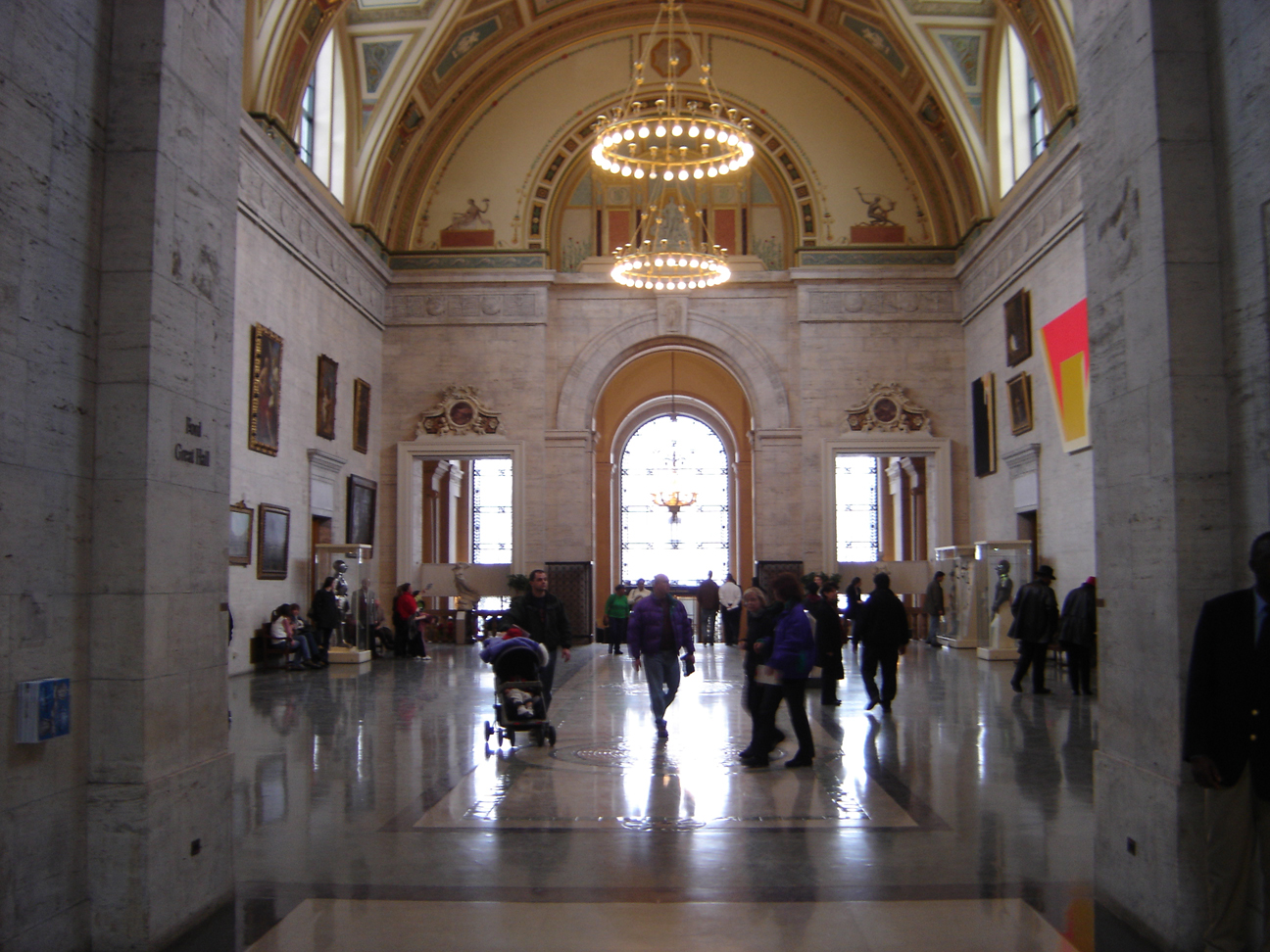
United States. The Detroit Institute of Arts in Detroit, Michigan

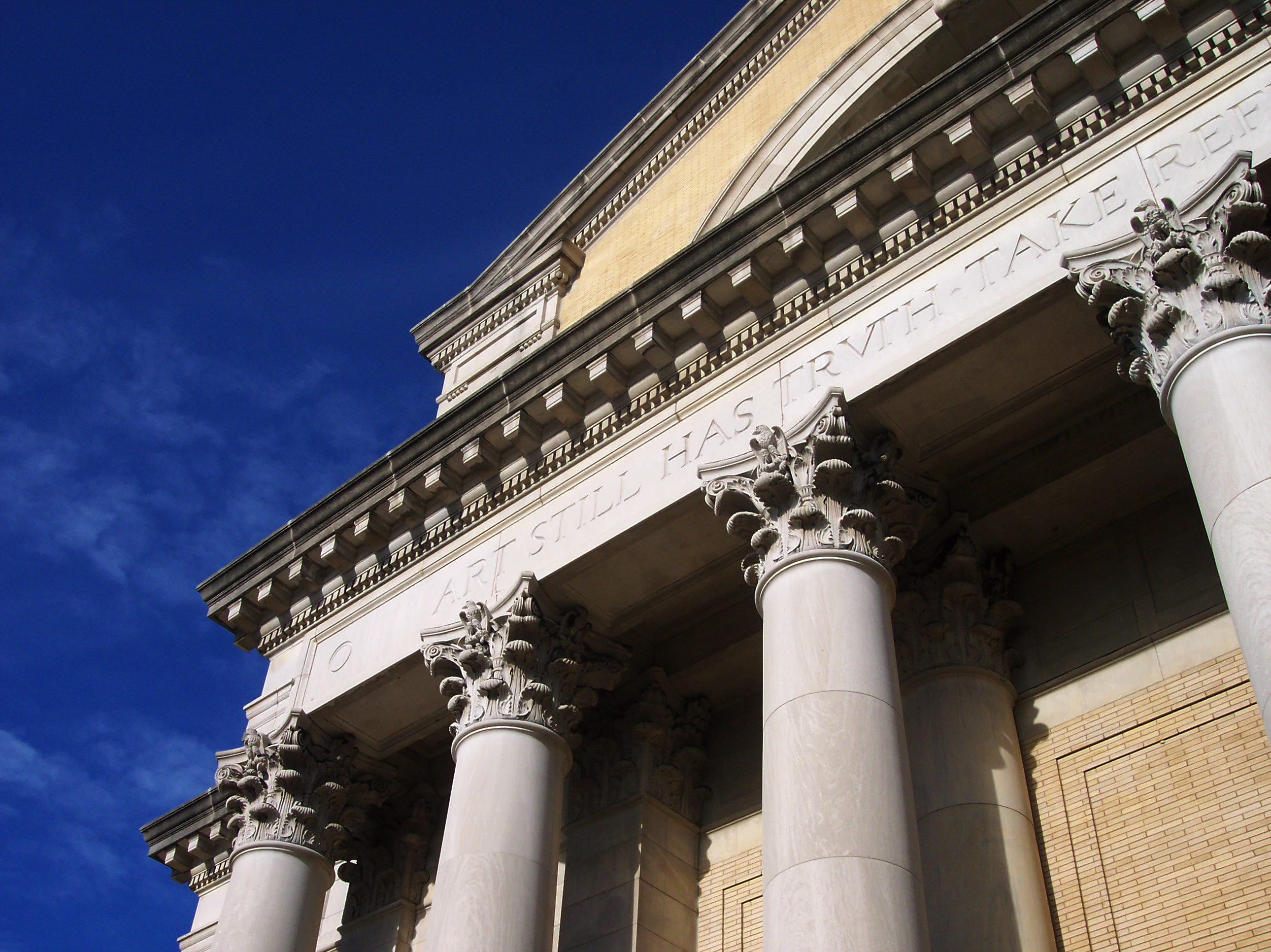
United States: Saint Louis Art Museum in St. Louis, Missouri

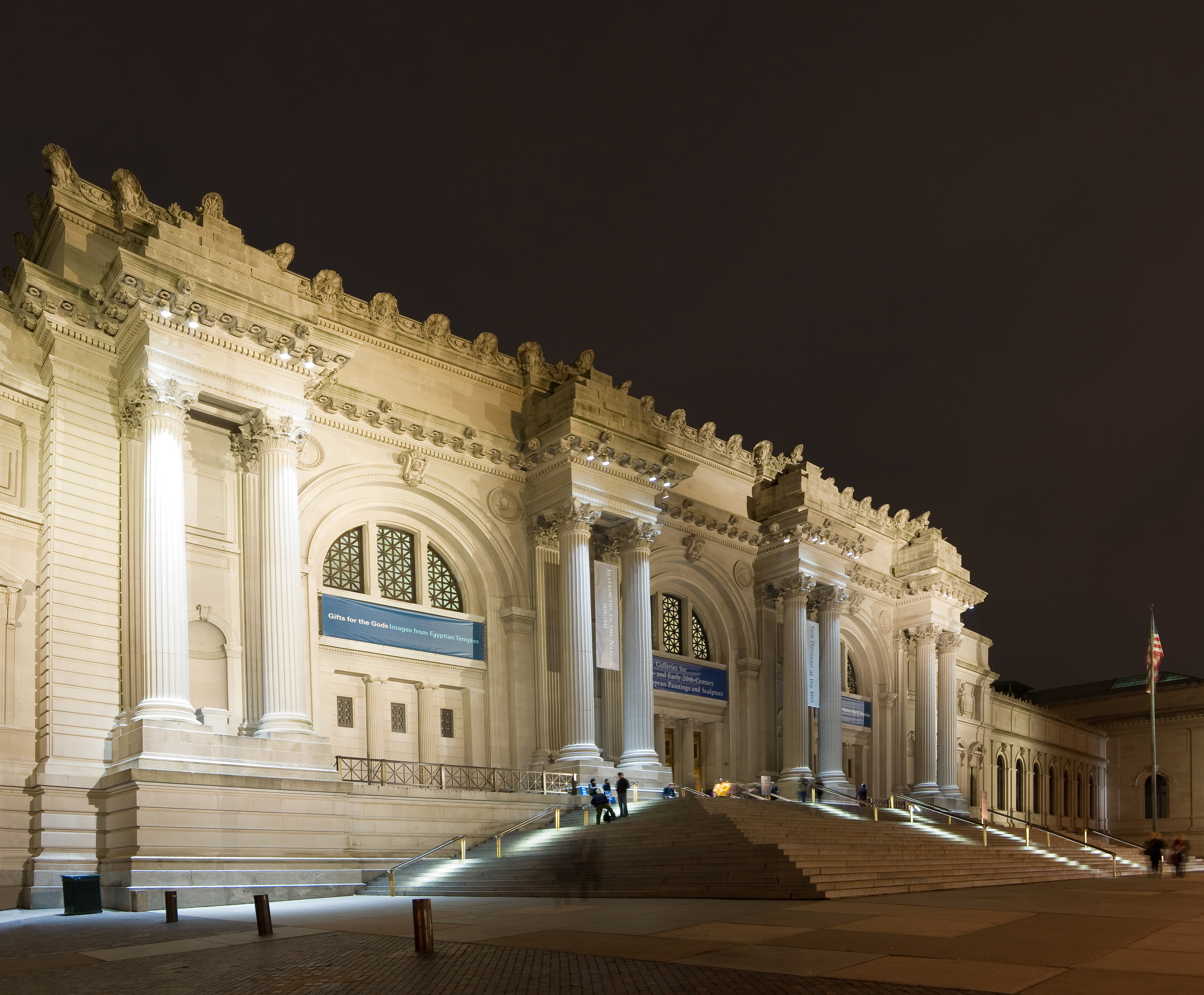
United States: The Metropolitan Museum of Art in New York City

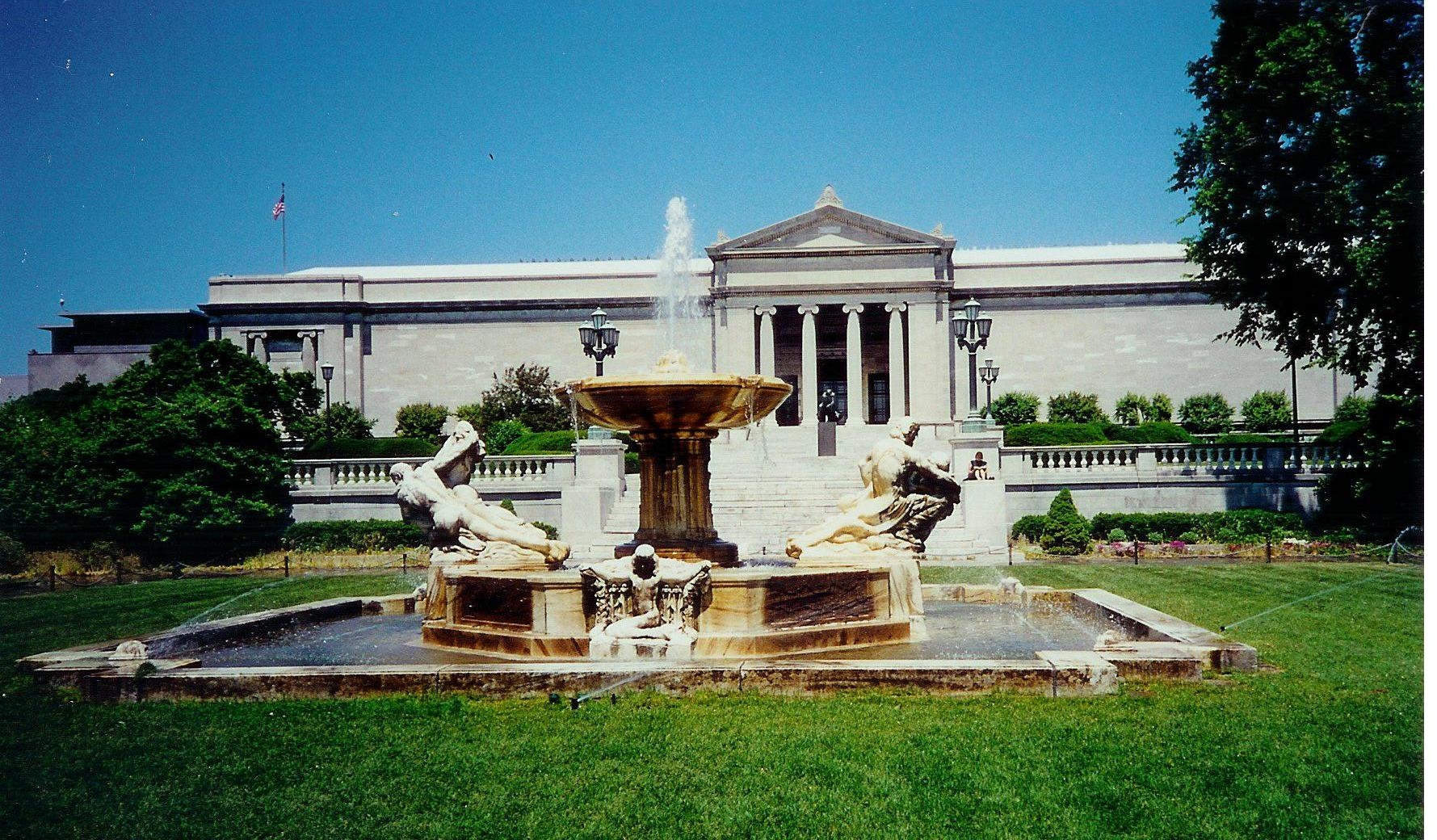
United States: Cleveland Museum of Art in Cleveland, Ohio

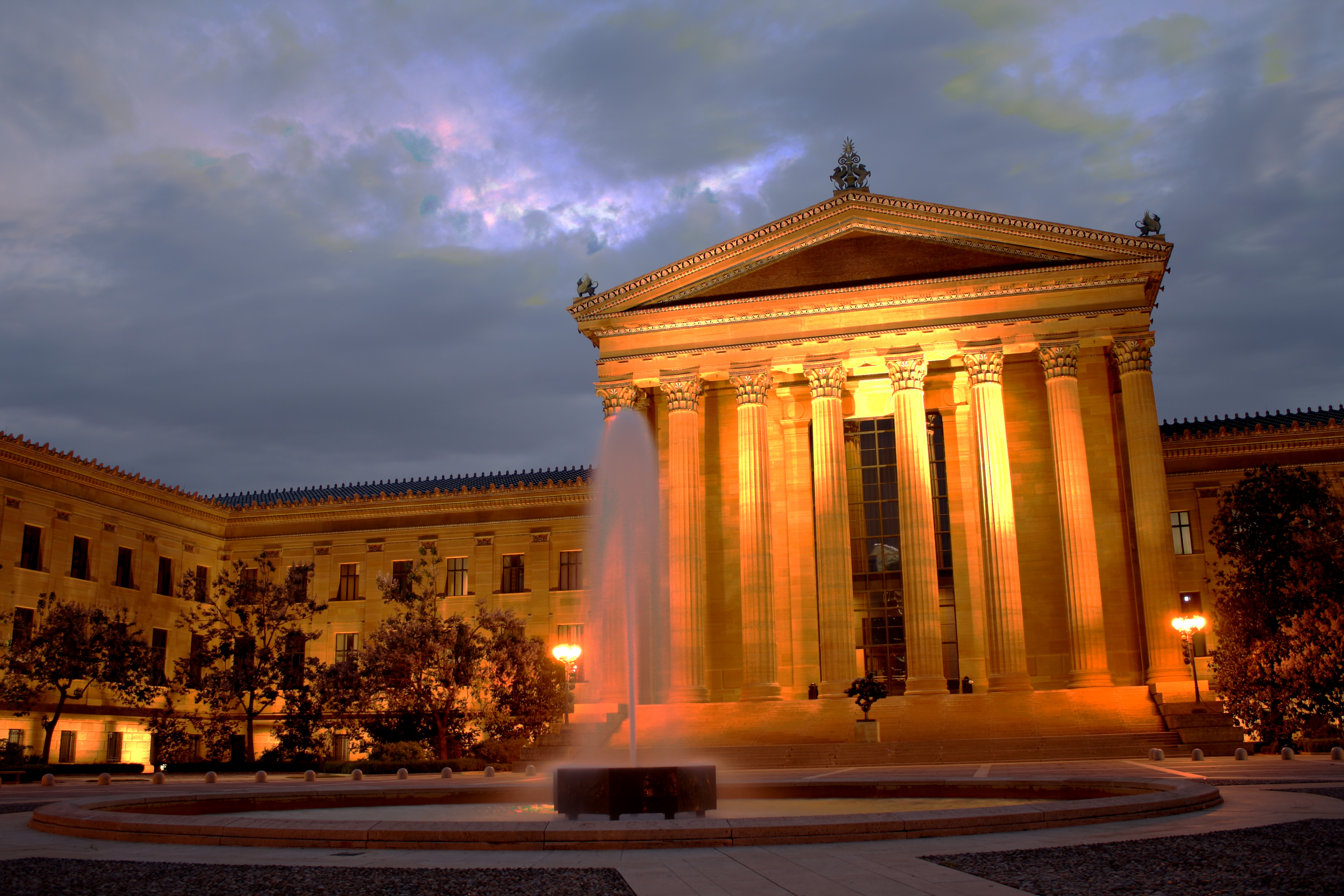
United States: Philadelphia Museum of Art in Philadelphia, Pennsylvania

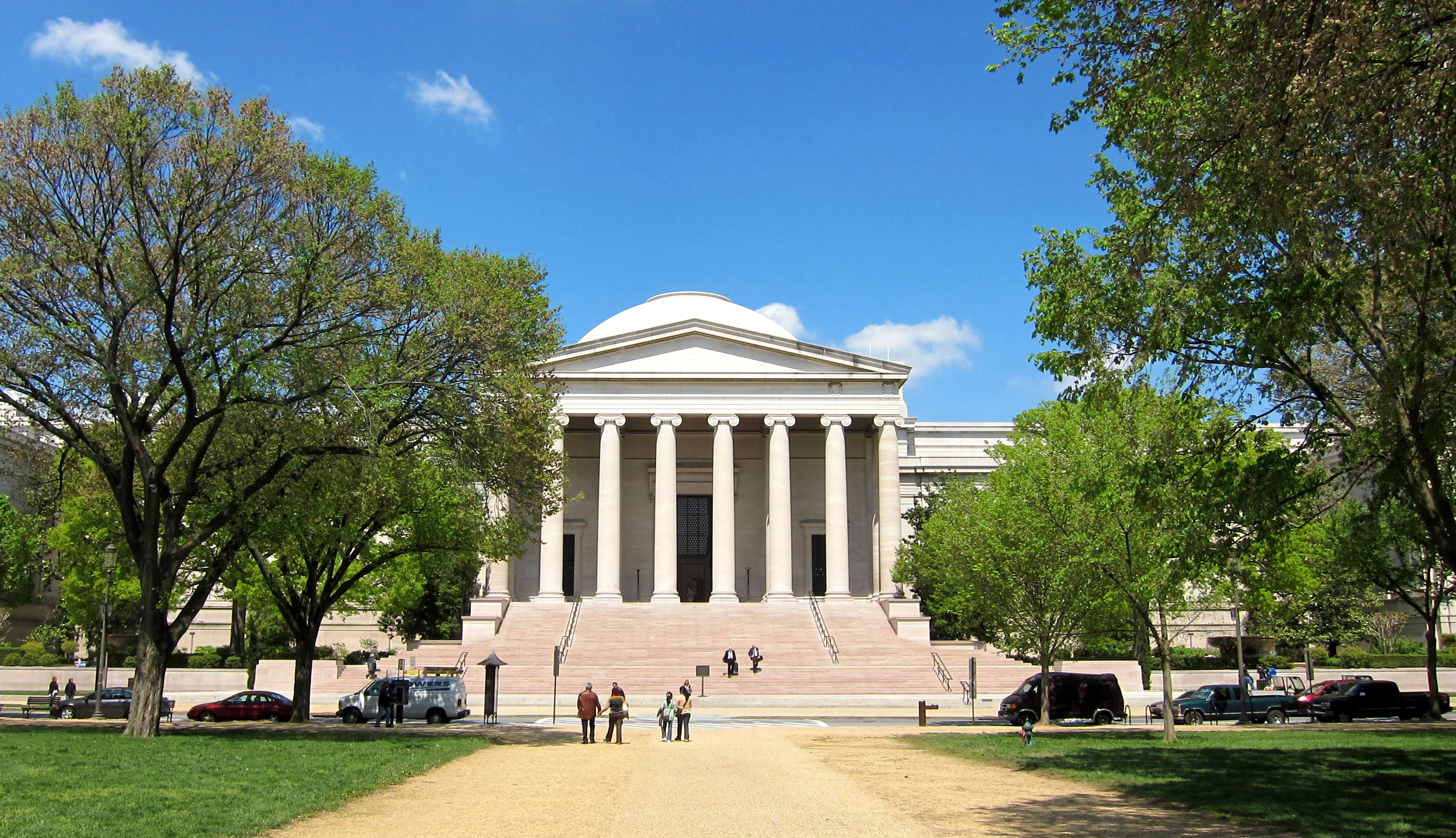
United States: National Gallery of Art in Washington D.C.

United States: National Gallery of Art in Washington D.C.

=== United States ===
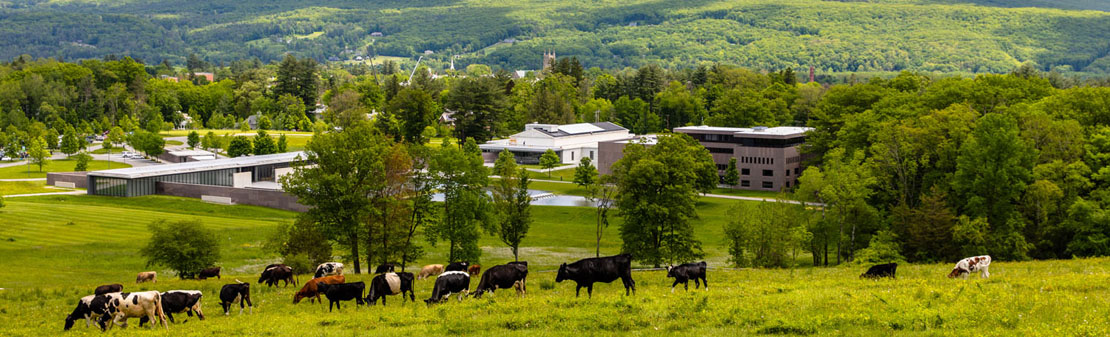
United States: the Clark Art Institute in Williamstown, Massachusetts

==== Alabama ====
- Birmingham: Birmingham Museum of Art
- Huntsville: Huntsville Museum of Art
- Mobile: Mobile Museum of Art
- Montgomery: Montgomery Museum of Fine Arts

==== Alaska ====
- Anchorage: Anchorage Museum of Art and History

==== Arizona ====
- Phoenix: Phoenix Art Museum
- Tempe: ASU Art Museum
- Tucson: Tucson Museum of Art

==== Arkansas ====
- Bentonville: Crystal Bridges Museum of American Art
- Little Rock: Arkansas Arts Center

==== California ====
- Los Angeles: J. Paul Getty Museum, Hammer Museum, Los Angeles County Museum of Art, Museum of Contemporary Art, Los Angeles, The Broad
- Palm Springs: Palm Springs Art Museum
- Pasadena: Norton Simon Museum, Pacific Asia Museum
- Sacramento: Crocker Art Museum
- San Diego: Mingei International Museum, Museum of Contemporary Art San Diego, San Diego Museum of Art, Timken Museum of Art
- San Marino: Huntington Library
- San Francisco: San Francisco Museum of Modern Art, California Palace of the Legion of Honor, M. H. de Young Memorial Museum, Femina Potens Art Gallery, Asian Art Museum of San Francisco, Exploratorium
- Santa Barbara: Santa Barbara Museum of Art
- Santa Monica: Santa Monica Museum of Art
- Stanford: Iris & B. Gerald Cantor Center for Visual Arts

==== Colorado ====
- Aspen: Aspen Art Museum
- Denver: Anschutz collection, Clyfford Still Museum, Denver Art Museum, Denver Public Library

==== Connecticut ====
- Farmington: Hill-Stead Museum
- Hartford: Wadsworth Atheneum
- New Britain: New Britain Museum of American Art
- New Haven: Yale Center for British Art, Yale University Art Gallery
- Old Lyme: Florence Griswold Museum

==== Delaware ====
- Dover: Biggs Museum of American Art
- Greenville: Henry Francis du Pont Winterthur Museum
- Wilmington: Delaware Art Museum, Delaware Center for the Contemporary Arts

==== Florida ====
- Boca Raton: Boca Raton Museum of Art
- Bradenton: Village of the Arts
- Gainesville: Samuel P. Harn Museum of Art at the University of Florida
- Jacksonville: Museum of Contemporary Art Jacksonville
- Lakeland: Polk Museum of Art
- Miami: Bass Museum, Frost Art Museum, Lowe Art Museum, Pérez Art Museum Miami, Museum of Contemporary Art, Wolfsonian-FIU Museum
- Naples: Naples Museum of Art
- Ocala: Appleton Museum of Art
- Orlando: Orlando Museum of Art
- Sarasota: Ringling Museum of Art
- St. Petersburg: Salvador Dalí Museum
- West Palm Beach: Norton Museum of Art
- Winter Park: Charles Hosmer Morse Museum of American Art

==== Georgia ====
- Athens: Georgia Museum of Art
- Atlanta: Michael C. Carlos Museum, High Museum of Art
- Savannah: Telfair Museum of Art

==== Hawaii ====
- Honolulu: Hawaii State Art Museum, Honolulu Museum of Art, John Young Museum of Art

==== Idaho ====
- Boise: Boise Art Museum
- Idaho Falls: Art Museum of Eastern Idaho

==== Illinois ====
- Champaign: Krannert Art Museum
- Chicago: Art Institute of Chicago, Museum of Contemporary Art, National Museum of Mexican Art, National Museum of Puerto Rican Arts and Culture, Oriental Institute, National Veterans Art Museum, Smart Museum of Art, Ukrainian Institute of Modern Art
- Evanston: Mary and Leigh Block Museum of Art
- Peoria: Peoria Riverfront Museum
- Springfield: Illinois State Museum

==== Indiana ====
- Bloomington: Sidney and Lois Eskenazi Museum of Art, Indiana University
- Indianapolis: Indianapolis Museum of Art, Eiteljorg Museum of American Indians and Western Art
- Muncie: David Owsley Museum of Art, Ball State University
- Notre Dame: Snite Museum of Art
- Plymouth: Heartland Artists Gallery
- Terre Haute: Sheldon Swope Art Museum

==== Iowa ====
- Davenport: Figge Art Museum
- Des Moines: Des Moines Art Center
- Iowa City: The University of Iowa Museum of Art

==== Kansas ====
- Belleville: Boyer Gallery
- Lawrence: Spencer Museum of Art
- Lindsborg: Birger Sandzén Memorial Gallery
- Manhattan: Marianna Kistler Beach Museum of Art
- Overland Park: Nerman Museum of Contemporary Art
- Wichita: Wichita Art Museum

==== Kentucky ====
- Louisville: Speed Art Museum
- Owensboro: Owensboro Museum of Fine Art

==== Louisiana ====
- Baton Rouge: Shaw Center for the Arts
- New Orleans: Ogden Museum of Southern Art, New Orleans Museum of Art
- Lafayette: Paul and Lulu Hilliard University Art Museum

==== Maine ====
- Brunswick: Bowdoin College Museum of Art
- Portland: Portland Museum of Art
- Ogunquit: Ogunquit Museum of American Art
- Rockland: Farnsworth Art Museum, Center for Maine Contemporary Art
- Waterville: Colby College Museum of Art

==== Maryland ====
- Baltimore: American Visionary Art Museum, Baltimore Museum of Art, Walters Art Museum

==== Massachusetts ====
- Amherst: Mead Art Museum, University Museum of Contemporary Art, Eric Carle Museum of Picture Book Art
- Andover: Addison Gallery of American Art
- Boston: Boston Museum of Fine Arts, Isabella Stewart Gardner Museum, Institute of Contemporary Art, Boston, McMullen Museum of Art, Museum of Bad Art
- Brockton: Fuller Craft Museum
- Cambridge: Harvard Art Museums, List Visual Arts Center, Peabody Museum of Archaeology and Ethnology
- Clinton: Museum of Russian Icons
- Dennis: Cape Cod Museum of Art
- Duxbury: Art Complex Museum
- Fitchburg: Fitchburg Art Museum
- Framingham: Danforth Museum
- Gloucester: Cape Ann Museum
- Harvard: Fruitlands Museum
- Lenox: Frelinghuysen Morris House and Studio
- Lincoln: DeCordova Museum and Sculpture Park
- North Adams: Massachusetts Museum of Contemporary Art
- Northampton: Smith College Museum of Art
- Provincetown: Provincetown Art Association and Museum
- Salem: Peabody Essex Museum
- South Hadley: Mount Holyoke College Art Museum
- Springfield: George Walter Vincent Smith Art Museum, Michele & Donald D’Amour Museum of Fine Arts
- Stockbridge: Chesterwood, Norman Rockwell Museum
- Waltham: Rose Art Museum
- Wellesley: Davis Museum and Cultural Center
- West Stockbridge: Turn Park Art Space
- Williamstown: Clark Art Institute, Williams College Museum of Art
- Worcester: Worcester Art Museum

==== Michigan ====
- Ann Arbor: University of Michigan Museum of Art
- Detroit: Detroit Institute of Arts
- Grand Rapids: Grand Rapids Art Museum

==== Minnesota ====
- Minneapolis: Minneapolis Institute of Art, Walker Art Center, The Museum of Russian Art

==== Mississippi ====
- Jackson: Mississippi Museum of Art
- Biloxi: Ohr-O'Keefe Museum of Art
- Laurel: Lauren Rogers Museum of Art

==== Missouri ====
- St. Louis: Saint Louis Art Museum, Mildred Lane Kemper Art Museum
- Kansas City, Missouri: Nelson-Atkins Museum of Art, Kemper Museum of Contemporary Art

==== Montana ====
- Billings: Yellowstone Art Museum
- Helena: Holter Museum of Art
- Missoula: Missoula Art Museum

==== Nebraska ====
- Kearney: Museum of Nebraska Art
- Lincoln: Sheldon Museum of Art
- Omaha: Joslyn Art Museum

==== Nevada ====
- Reno:

==== New Jersey ====
- Glassboro: Heritage Glass Museum
- Jersey City: Mana Contemporary, Museum of Russian Art
- Montclair: Montclair Art Museum
- Newark: Newark Museum of Art
- New Brunswick: Zimmerli Art Museum
- Princeton: Princeton University Art Museum

==== New Hampshire ====
- Hanover: Hood Museum of Art
- Manchester: Currier Museum of Art

==== New Mexico ====
- Santa Fe: New Mexico Museum of Art, Museum of International Folk Art, SITE Santa Fe; IAIA Museum of Contemporary Native Arts, Museum of Indian Arts and Culture, Georgia O'Keeffe Museum, Museum of Spanish Colonial Art
- Taos, New Mexico: Taos Art Museum, Harwood Museum of Art, Millicent Rogers Museum

==== New York ====
- Albany: Albany Institute of History & Art
- Beacon: Dia:Beacon
- Buffalo: Albright-Knox Art Gallery
- Canajoharie, New York: Arkell Museum
- Cooperstown: Fenimore Art Museum
- Corning: Corning Museum of Glass, Rockwell Museum
- Elmira: Arnot Art Museum
- Glens Falls: Hyde Collection
- Huntington: Heckscher Museum of Art
- Ithaca: Herbert F. Johnson Museum of Art
- Mountainville: Storm King Art Center
- New York City: Guggenheim, Metropolitan Museum of Art, Museum of Modern Art (MoMA), Whitney Museum of American Art, Brooklyn Museum, Frick Collection, The Morgan Library & Museum, The Cloisters, Dahesh Museum of Art, Asia Society, Neue Galerie New York, Hispanic Society of America, Museum of the City of New York, Cooper-Hewitt Museum, New Museum of Contemporary Art, Rubin Museum of Art, P.S.1 Contemporary Art Center, Jacques Marchais Museum of Tibetan Art, Dia Art Foundation, Wallach Art Gallery
- Poughkeepsie: Frances Lehman Loeb Art Center
- Rochester: Memorial Art Gallery
- Southampton: Parrish Art Museum
- Syracuse: Everson Museum of Art
- Utica: Munson-Williams-Proctor Arts Institute

==== North Carolina ====
- Asheville: Asheville Art Museum, Folk Art Center
- Chapel Hill: Ackland Art Museum
- Charlotte: Bechtler Museum of Modern Art, Mint Museum of Art
- Durham: Nasher Museum of Art
- Greensboro: Weatherspoon Art Museum
- Raleigh: North Carolina Museum of Art, Contemporary Art Museum of Raleigh
- Winston-Salem: Reynolda House Museum of American Art

==== North Dakota ====
- Dickinson: Dickinson Museum Center
- Fargo: Plains Art Museum
- Grand Forks: North Dakota Museum of Art
- Minot: Taube Museum of Art

==== Ohio ====
- Akron: Akron Art Museum
- Cincinnati: Cincinnati Art Museum, Contemporary Arts Center, Taft Museum of Art
- Cleveland: The Cleveland Museum of Art
- Columbus: Columbus Museum of Art, Wexner Center
- Oberlin: Allen Memorial Art Museum
- Toledo: Toledo Museum of Art
- Youngstown: The Butler Institute of American Art

==== Oklahoma ====
- Norman: Fred Jones Jr. Museum of Art
- Oklahoma City: Oklahoma City Museum of Art, National Cowboy & Western Heritage Museum
- Shawnee: Mabee-Gerrer Museum of Art
- Tulsa: Gilcrease Museum, Philbrook Museum of Art, Sherwin Miller Museum of Jewish Art

==== Oregon ====
- Eugene: Jordan Schnitzer Museum of Art
- Portland: Portland Art Museum
- Salem: Hallie Ford Museum of Art

==== Pennsylvania ====
- Allentown: Allentown Art Museum
- Chadds Ford: Brandywine River Museum
- Greensburg: Westmoreland Museum of American Art
- Philadelphia: Barnes Foundation, Pennsylvania Academy of Fine Arts, Philadelphia Museum of Art, Rodin Museum, University of Pennsylvania Museum of Archaeology and Anthropology
- Pittsburgh: The Andy Warhol Museum, Carnegie Museum of Art, Frick Art & Historical Center, Mattress Factory, Randyland, Toonseum, Trundle Manor

==== Puerto Rico ====
- Ponce: Ponce Museum of Art
- San Juan: Museum of Art of Puerto Rico

==== Rhode Island ====
- Newport: Newport Art Museum, National Museum of American Illustration
- Providence: Rhode Island School of Design Museum

==== South Carolina ====
- Charleston: Gibbes Museum of Art
- Greenville: Bob Jones University Museum and Gallery, Greenville County Museum of Art
- Columbia: Columbia Museum of Art

==== Tennessee ====
- Chattanooga: Hunter Museum of American Art
- Knoxville: Knoxville Museum of Art
- Memphis: Art Museum of the University of Memphis, Belz Museum of Asian and Judaic Art, Dixon Gallery and Gardens, Memphis Brooks Museum of Art
- Nashville: Frist Center for the Visual Arts, Cheekwood Museum of Art, Fisk University Galleries

==== Texas ====
- Abilene: The Grace Museum
- Albany: Old Jail Art Center
- Amarillo: Amarillo Museum of Art
- Arlington: Arlington Museum of Art
- Austin: Austin Museum of Art, Blanton Museum of Art, Elisabet Ney Museum, Harry Ransom Center, Mexic-Arte Museum
- Beaumont: Art Museum of Southeast Texas, Dishman Art Museum
- Corsicana: The Pearce Collections at Navarro College
- Dallas: Crow Collection of Asian Art, Dallas Contemporary, Dallas Museum of Art, Meadows Museum, Museum of Biblical Art, Museum of Geometric and MADI Art
- El Paso: El Paso Museum of Art
- Fort Worth: Amon Carter Museum, Kimbell Art Museum, Modern Art Museum of Fort Worth, Sid Richardson Museum
- Houston: ArtCar Museum, Bayou Bend Collection and Gardens, Blaffer Art Museum, Contemporary Arts Museum Houston, Houston Center for Contemporary Craft, Lawndale Art Center, Museum of Fine Arts, Houston, Menil Collection, Project Row Houses, Rothko Chapel,
- Irving: Irving Arts Center
- Kerrville: Museum of Western Art
- Marfa: Chinati Foundation
- McAllen: International Museum of Art & Science
- Orange: Stark Museum of Art
- San Antonio: Artpace, Blue Star Contemporary Art Center, McNay Art Museum, San Antonio Museum of Art
- Tyler: Tyler Museum of Art

==== Utah ====
- Brigham City: Brigham City Museum of Art & History
- Salt Lake City: Utah Museum of Contemporary Art

==== Vermont ====
- Burlington: Robert Hull Fleming Museum
- Middlebury: Middlebury College Museum of Art
- Shelburne: Shelburne Museum

==== Virginia ====
- Charlottesville: Fralin Museum of Art
- Norfolk: Chrysler Museum of Art
- Richmond: Virginia Museum of Fine Arts
- Roanoke: Taubman Museum of Art
- Williamsburg: Abby Aldrich Rockefeller Folk Art Museum

==== Washington (state) ====
- Seattle: Seattle Art Museum, Seattle Asian Art Museum, Frye Art Museum, gum wall
- Maryhill, Maryhill Museum of Art

==== Washington, D.C. ====
- National Gallery of Art
- Hirshhorn Museum and Sculpture Garden
- National Museum of Women in the Arts
- Phillips Collection
- Dumbarton Oaks
- Smithsonian American Art Museum
- US Art Gallery,
- Corcoran Gallery of Art
- National Portrait Gallery
- Kreeger Museum
- Freer Gallery of Art
- Arthur M. Sackler Gallery

==== West Virginia ====
- Huntington: Huntington Museum of Art

==== Wisconsin ====
- Appleton: Trout Museum of Art
- Madison: Chazen Museum of Art, Madison Museum of Contemporary Art
- Manitowoc: Rahr-West Art Museum
- Milwaukee: Grohmann Museum, Patrick and Beatrice Haggerty Museum of Art, Milwaukee Art Museum, Villa Terrace Decorative Arts Museum, Charles Allis Art Museum
- Neenah: Bergstrom-Mahler Museum of Glass
- Oshkosh: Paine Art Center and Gardens
- Racine: Racine Art Museum
- Sheboygan: John Michael Kohler Arts Center
- Sturgeon Bay: Miller Art Museum
- Wausau: Leigh Yawkey Woodson Art Museum
- West Bend: Museum of Wisconsin Art

==== Wyoming ====
- Jackson Hole: National Museum of Wildlife Art
- Sheridan County, Wyoming: The Brinton Museum

== Oceania ==
=== Australia ===
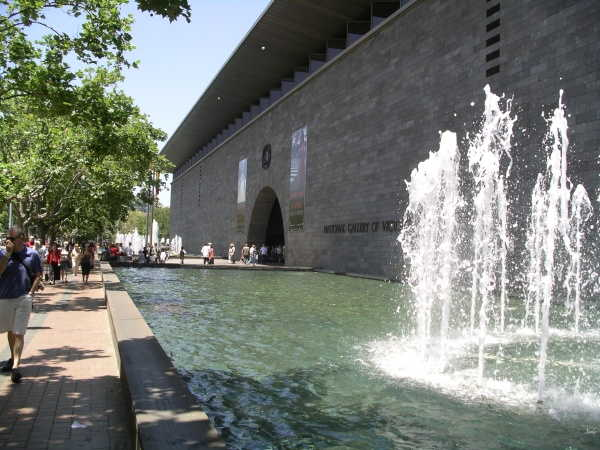
Australia: The National Gallery of Victoria in Melbourne, Australia's largest art museum

- Adelaide: Art Gallery of South Australia
- Ballarat: Ballarat Fine Art Gallery
- Brisbane: Queensland Art Gallery; Queensland Gallery of Modern Art
- Canberra: National Gallery of Australia; Canberra Museum and Gallery
- Darwin: Museum and Art Gallery of the Northern Territory
- Geelong: Geelong Art Gallery
- Hobart: Museum of Old and New Art; Tasmanian Museum and Art Gallery
- Melbourne: National Gallery of Victoria; Ian Potter Centre; Ian Potter Museum of Art (University of Melbourne)
- Perth: Art Gallery of Western Australia
- Rockhampton: Rockhampton Museum of Art
- Sydney: Art Gallery of New South Wales; Museum of Contemporary Art

=== New Zealand ===
- Auckland: Auckland Art Gallery
- Christchurch: Christchurch Art Gallery
- Dunedin: Dunedin Public Art Gallery
- Mangaweka: Permanent display of New Zealand's most famed forger C.F. Goldie (also known as Karl Sim)
- Wellington: Museum of New Zealand Te Papa Tongarewa; National Art Gallery of New Zealand (now part of Te Papa)

== South America ==
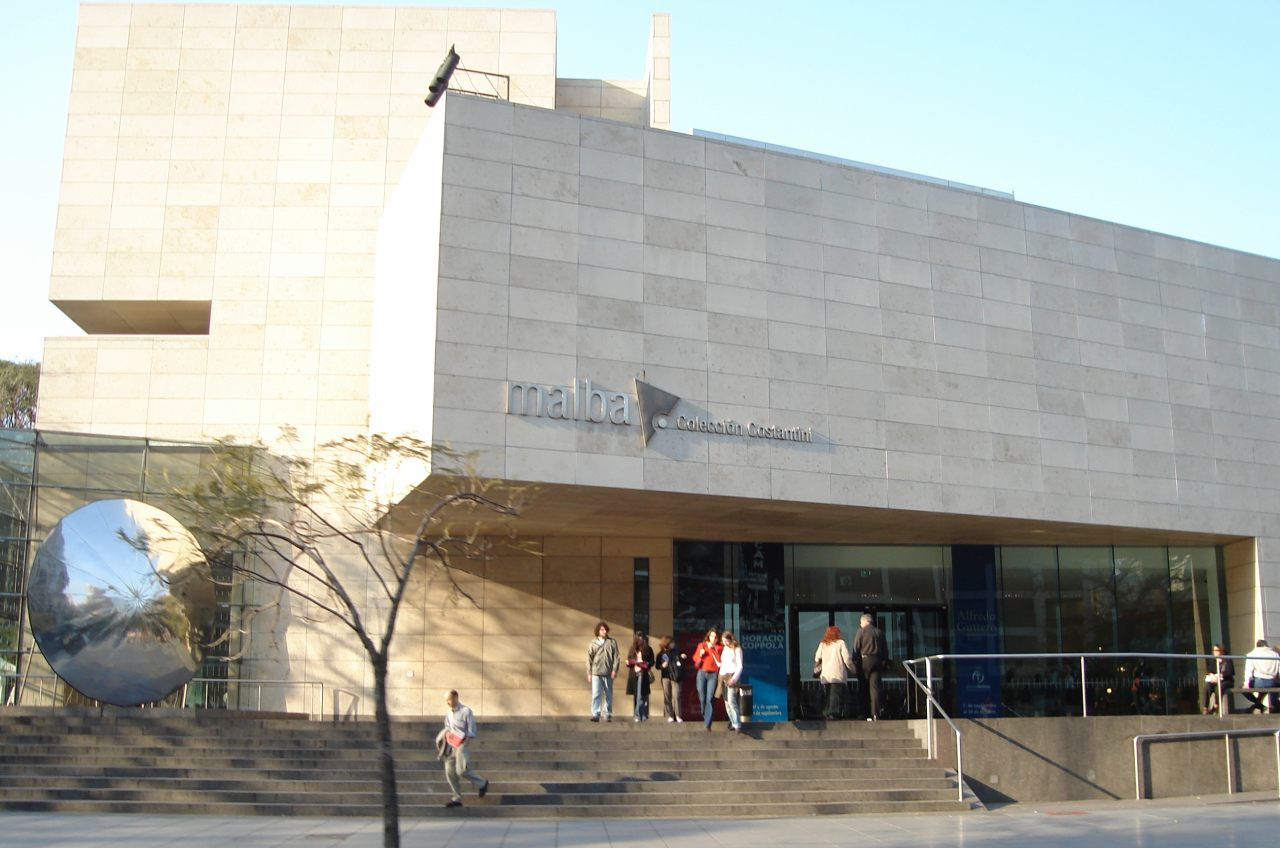
Argentina: MALBA in Buenos Aires

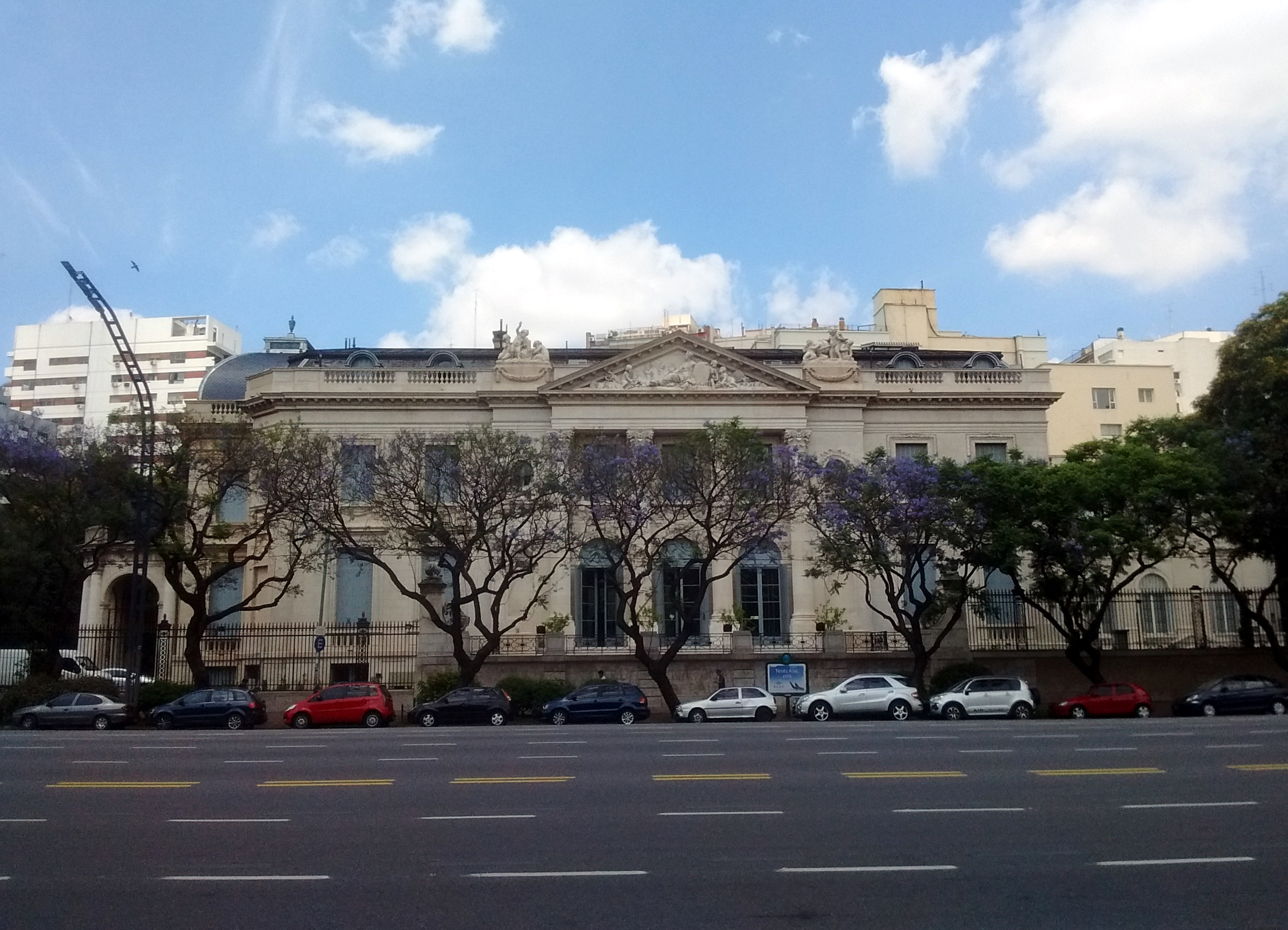
Argentina: National Museum of Decorative Arts in Buenos Aires

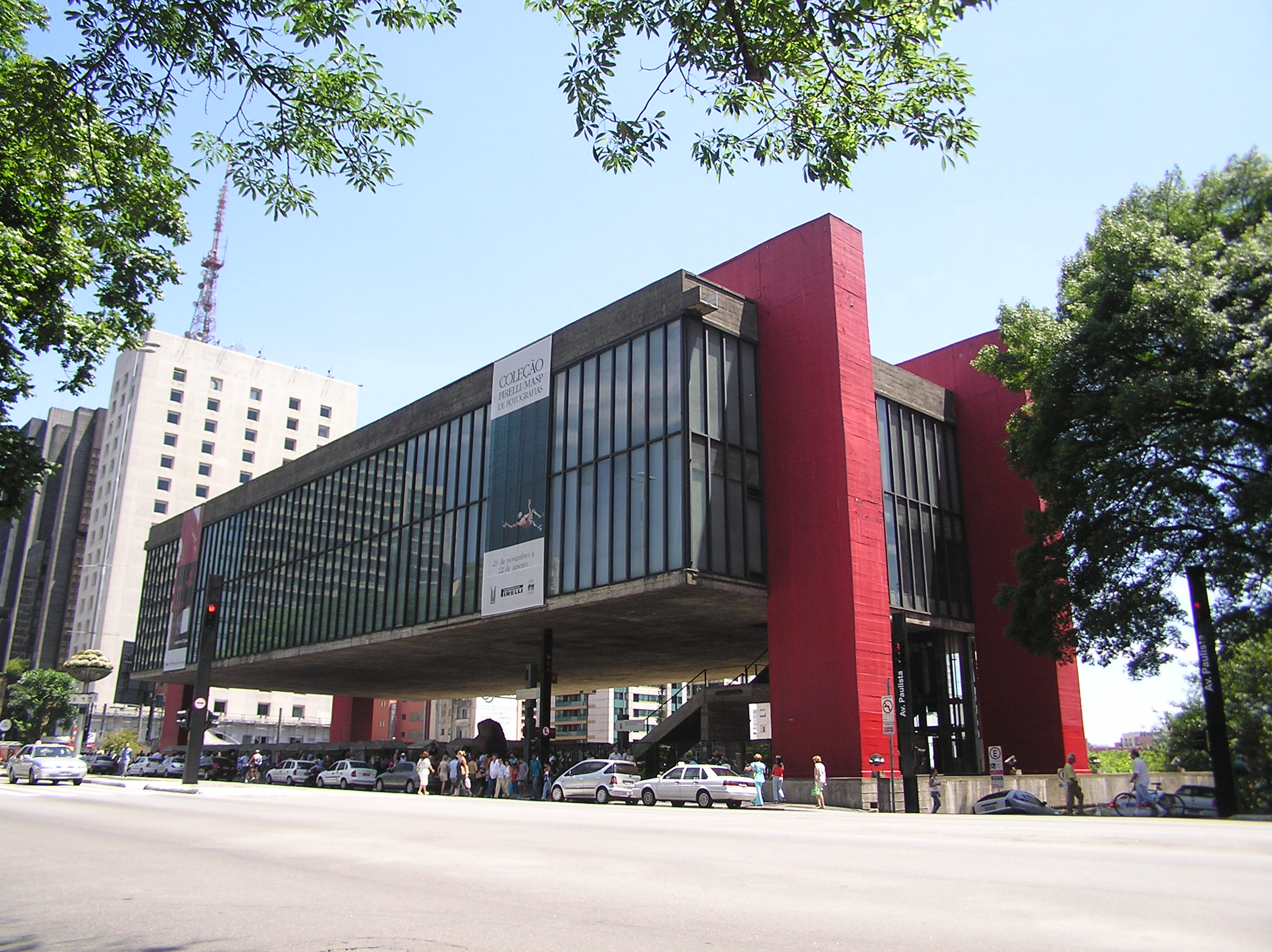
Brazil: São Paulo Museum of Art in São Paulo

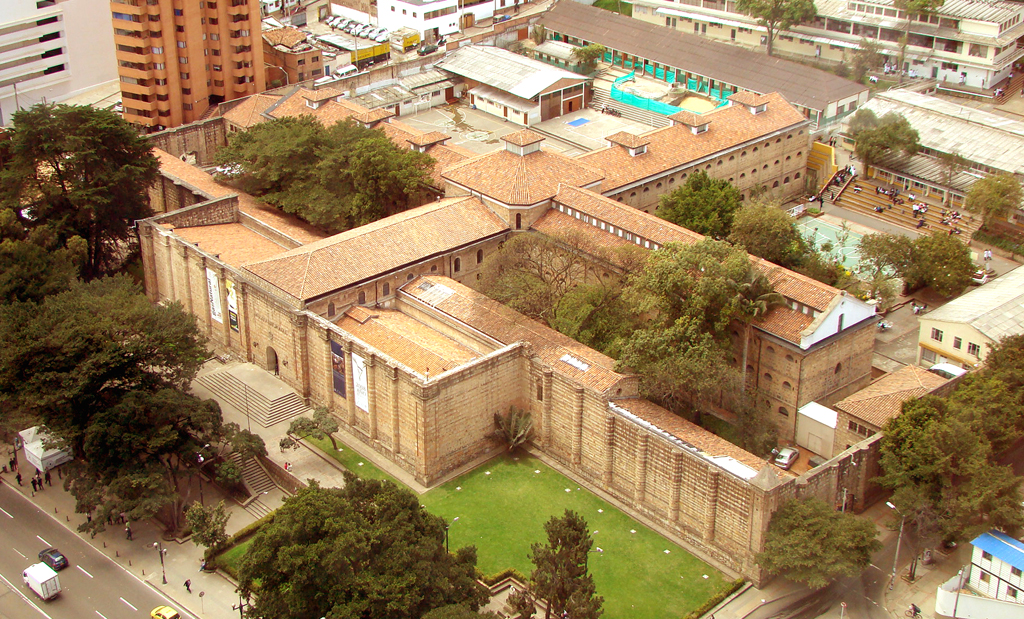
Colombia: Colombian National Museum in Bogotá

=== Argentina ===
- Buenos Aires: Museo Nacional de Bellas Artes, Buenos Aires Museum of Modern Art (MAMBA), Latin American Art Museum of Buenos Aires (MALBA), National Museum of Decorative Arts, Ernesto de la Cárcova Museum of Reproductions and Comparative Sculpture, Fortabat Art Collection, Museo de Arte Español Enrique Larreta, Museo de Arte Hispanoamericano Isaac Fernández Blanco, Tigre Club
- Córdoba: Caraffa Fine Arts Museum, Evita Fine Arts Museum
- Junín: Ángel María de Rosa Municipal Museum of Art
- Mar del Plata: Juan Carlos Castagnino Municipal Museum of Art
- Rosario: Firma y Odilo Estévez Municipal Decorative Art Museum, Juan B. Castagnino Fine Arts Museum, Museum of Contemporary Art of Rosario
- San Miguel de Tucumán: Timoteo Navarro Museum of Art

=== Brazil ===
- Niterói: Niterói Contemporary Art Museum
- Porto Alegre: Rio Grande do Sul Museum of Art
- Ribeirão Preto: Museu de Arte de Ribeirão Preto
- Rio de Janeiro: Museu Nacional de Belas Artes, Museum of Modern Art Rio de Janeiro(MAM)
- Santa Catarina: Santa Catarina Art Museum
- São Paulo: São Paulo Museum of Art, São Paulo Museum of Modern Art (MAM), Museum of Contemporary Art, University of São Paulo

=== Chile ===
- Santiago de Chile: Museo Nacional de Bellas Artes, Santiago Museum of Contemporary Art (MAC)

=== Colombia ===
- Bogotá: Bogotá Museum of Modern Art (MAMBO), Botero Museum, Colonial Art Museum of Bogotá, Colombian National Museum, Gold Museum, Museum of Contemporary Art of Bogotá, Miguel Urrutia Art Museum
- Cali: La Tertulia Museum
- Medellín: El Castillo Museum, Museum of Antioquia, Medellín Museum of Modern Art (MAMM)
- Ibagué: Museo de Arte del Tolima

=== Ecuador ===
- Quito: National Museum of Ecuador, Camilo Egas Museum, La Capilla del Hombre, Centro Cultural Metropolitano, House of Ecuadorian Culture
- Cuenca: Pumapungo Museum
- Guayaquil: Museum of Anthopology and Contemporary Art, Guayaquil Municipal Museum, Luis Adolfo Noboa Naranjo Museum

=== Peru ===
- Lima: Museo de Arte de Lima

== See also ==
- List of most visited art museums
- List of largest art museums
- List of sculpture parks
- List of single-artist museums
- List of design museums
