= Jamjuree Art Gallery =

Coordinates: 13°44′30″N 100°31′47″E

Jamjuree Art Gallery is an art museum owned by Chulalongkorn University in Bangkok, Thailand. Regular exhibits at the gallery include works of the university's students along with more experimental exhibits by rising local artists, established national painters, and international artists.
